= Battle of Helmstadt =

- Part of Austro-Prussian War
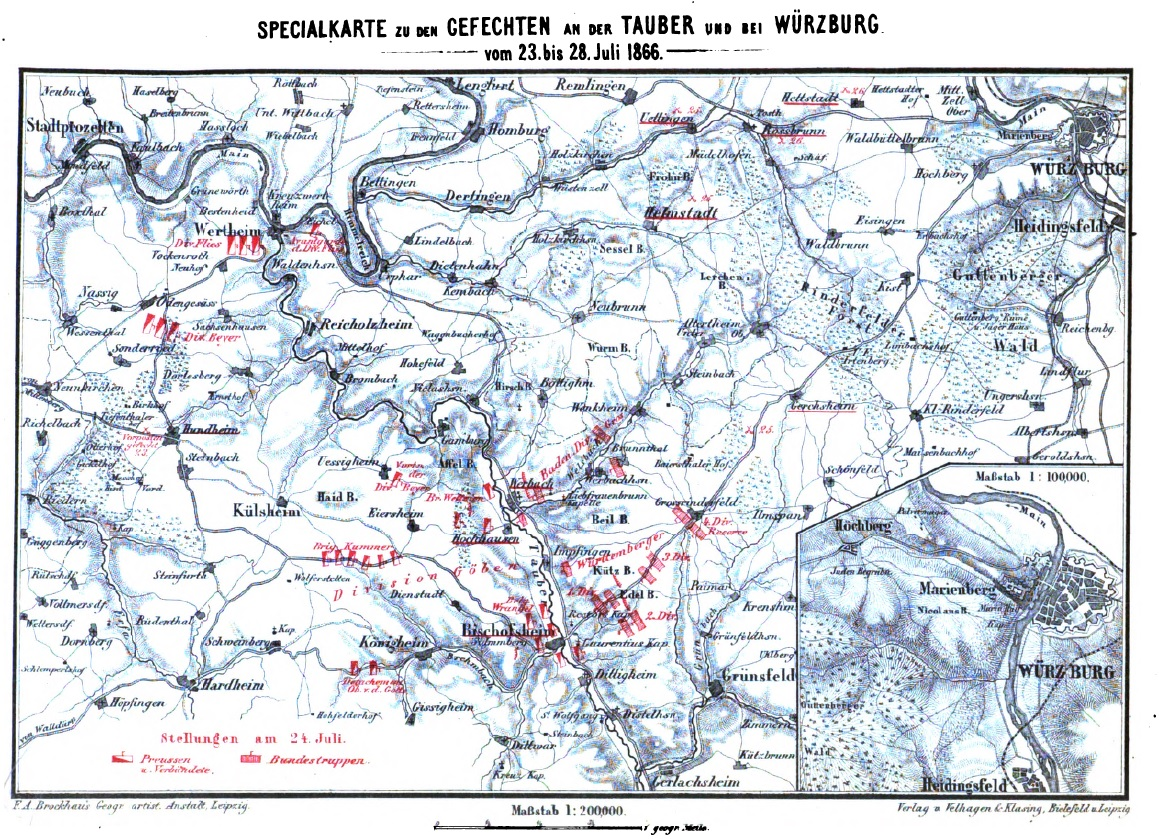
Date	25 July 1866
Location	Helmstadt, Bavaria 49°45′25″N 9°42′32″E
Result	Prussian victory

Belligerents
Prussia	Bavaria

Commanders and leaders
Edwin von Manteuffel; Gustav von Beyer	Prince Karl of Bavaria; Johann Baptist Stephan; Luitpold Ludwig

Units involved
1st Division; Göben Division; Beyer Division; Flies Division	1st Division; 3rd Division; VIII Corps

Strength
15,000 men	24,000 men

Casualties and losses
13 officers and 340 men	36 officers and 694 men
- Location within Germany Battle of Helmstadt (Europe)

The Battle of Helmstadt was a battle in the Main Campaign of the Austro-Prussian War on 25 July 1866, between the Prussian Main Army and the VIII Corps of the German Federal Army which consisted of soldiers from the Kingdom of Bavaria.

On the plateau between Tauber and Main, the federal troops were pushed back again on the 25th near Helmstadt and Uettingen and near Gerchsheim. In the fighting, the to be Bavarian King Ludwig III was wounded. After the Prussian bombardment of the Bavarian troops in the Marienberg Fortress near Würzburg on 27 July, a local ceasefire was concluded, which was followed on 2 August by the general armistice.

== History ==
The Battle of Königgrätz had already been a decisive victory for the Prussians on 3 July, and Austria was already in negotiations with Prussia. However, these negotiations initially only concerned Austria and Prussia. An offensive by the southern German states opened up a better starting position for future negotiations. In addition, there was still the possibility that France would intervene on the side of the southern Germans in the conflict in order to preserve its claims to Veneto.

The VIII Corps of the German Federal Army united on 20 July with the VII Corps, consisting of four Bavarian divisions, on the Tauber. With almost 100,000 men, the Federal Army was clearly superior to the Prussian Main Army with around 60,000 men. On 21 July a joint action by the Federal Army against Aschaffenburg was decided in the headquarters of Prince Karl of Bavaria, as the Prussians were still suspected to be near Frankfurt. 24 July was set as the date for the departure from the Tauber. The Bavarians would march over the Mainknie with the VIII. Corps along the Tauber.

After a successful campaign in the west, the Prussian Main Army marched into the federal capital of Frankfurt on 16 July. The Prussians gathered there and marched on 21 July from Frankfurt to Würzburg in order, if possible, to prevent the unification of the Federal Army and to defeat it or at least to further threaten the borders of the southern Germans. On the advance the Prussians advanced to three places on the Tauber: the Göben division on the right wing to Tauberbischofsheim, the Beyer division in the center to Werbach and the Flies division on the left wing to Wertheim.

On the Tauber, the Prussians first met the Bavarians, which was marching towards Aschaffenburg. On 23 July there was a first battle near Hundheim, but the commander of the VIII Corps, Prince Alexander of Hesse, did not recognize it until the next day after the defeats in Tauberbischofsheim and Werbachthat he was facing the entire Army of the Main. He then took the VIII Corps back to Groß-Rinderfeld. Because of the numerical inferiority of the Prussians, it was assumed that the Main Army would advance from Tauberbischofsheim and Werbach directly to Würzburg. Prince Alexander therefore requested support from the Bavarians, who had already been marching north. The Bavarians were supposed to cover the right wing of the VIII. Corps after the Baden division, which stood there, broke off the fight the day before, gave up the wing without reporting and withdrew to Altertheim. This was to prevent the Prussians from getting between the two halves of the armed forces. In addition, the Bavarian army was to be immediately concentrated in the area of Roßbrunn. The 3rd division, led by Prince Luitpold, moved there from Hettstadt on 24 July, the reserves accumulated between Greußenheim and Waldbüttelbrunn and the 1st Division led by Johann Baptist Stephan, stood around Uettingen, Helmstadt and Holzkirchen, with the advance troops at Neubrunn, Kembach and Dertingen. In the evening the VIII. Corps received news of their locations and instructions to keep in touch with the closest division which was the 1st Division.

== Aftermath ==
Measured against the number of soldiers deployed, the losses on both sides were rather small. The Bavarians had 43 dead, the Prussians lost 31 men. Comparable battles at the beginning of the war in Austria resulted in significantly more losses. In the ultimately decisive battle on the Lerchenberg, however, the fighting was fierce. The Bavarians had the heaviest casualties of the day with around 400 men. Likewise, the Prussian Regiment 32 deployed there had the most losses on the Prussian side. The battle itself was a tactical success for the Prussians. The Bavarian units had to leave the battlefield, but were still ready to fight. The 3rd Division gathered in Waldbrunn and marched to Waldbüttelbrunn and set up camp there. The 1st Division gathered near Uettingen and took up positions in Waldbrunn. Together with the two other divisions that had meanwhile been called in, the VII Corps was now assembled and ready for the offensive against the Army of the Main. The fact that the Bavarians were unable to assist the VIII. Corps in the battle near Gerchsheim due to the fighting near Helmstadt and this then retreated against Würzburg made it a strategic success. A joint approach was no longer possible for the armed forces for the rest of the war. The Beyer division had meanwhile made contact with the Flies division, which had advanced to Uettingen. The Prussians involved in the battle set up their outposts in the direction of Uettingen and made their night camp near Helmstadt. The Flies division was supposed to take action against Bavaria in Uettingen the next day and Beyer was supposed to support them.

=== Reasons for Starting ===
The Prussian generals summarized the cause of two Bavarian defeat as follows: “The two Bavarian divisions had started the short march to their rendezvous late and at different times. So it happened ...... that General v. Beyer was done with one when the other arrived, and that despite their significant superiority they were nevertheless decisively defeated. ” The Prussian victory are only partly due to the higher rate of fire of the needle gun. This was at least partially compensated for by the accuracy, range and reliability of the Podewils rifle used by the Bavarians. Rather, the leadership of the Prussians contributed significantly to the success. The principle “march separately, strike together” was also applied on 25 July. The Prussians led the fight much more flexibly than the federal troops, which had not yet formed to repel the attack because of the originally planned offensive against Aschaffenburg. The Main Army split up in front of the numerically superior federal troops and defeated superior units of the federal army, whereby the divisions remained in constant contact. In Gerchsheim, Goeben's division defeated the entire VII Corps. In Helmstadt the regiments maneuvered the Bavarians out again and again and pulled together again at the right moment, as with Frohnberg. On the evening of the 25th, all divisions had contact in the event that a battle with the united federal army had broken out the next day. The numerical superiority of Bavaria is deceptive. It was later claimed that Beyer's division defeated three Bavarian divisions that day. In fact, apart from the 3rd Division, not even half of the 1st Division was in action. Only a few battalions of the second division took part in the fighting. All battles took place independently of one another, the actions of the divisions were uncoordinated. The lack of coordination affected all levels. On the Stuhlberg, due to the different affiliations to divisions, brigades and regiments, it was not possible to agree on a uniform approach. The Stephan division sent reinforcements too late, while the Baden division simply refused. At corps level, despite the short distances between VII. And VIII. Corps, the movements were communicated too late, if at all. In all cases the Prussians took advantage of this and defeated the dispersed units individually.

== Effects of the Battle ==
The news that the VIII. Corps was withdrawing to Würzburg did not reach Prince Karl until the next morning. Thus, the plan to proceed in a coordinated manner with joint forces had to be dropped. Instead, the Bavarians covered the passage of the VII Corps over the Main in the Battle of Rossbrunn. On this day, the people of Baden took part in a battle for the last time in this war. The Baden division was ordered back to its barracks on 29 July, before the end of the war. At the beginning of August, Baden left the German Confederation. Their commander, Wilhelm, Prince of Baden, was publicly criticized for his behavior in the battles on 24 July at Tauberbischofsheim and on 25 July at Gerchsheim and Helmstadt. Wilhelm was himself a Prussian guard officer and related to the Prussian ruling house. He then wrote a book that described the course of the war from the perspective of Baden. While in the same year General Beyer became inspector of the Army of Baden and in 1868 Baden's minister of war.

== Legacy ==
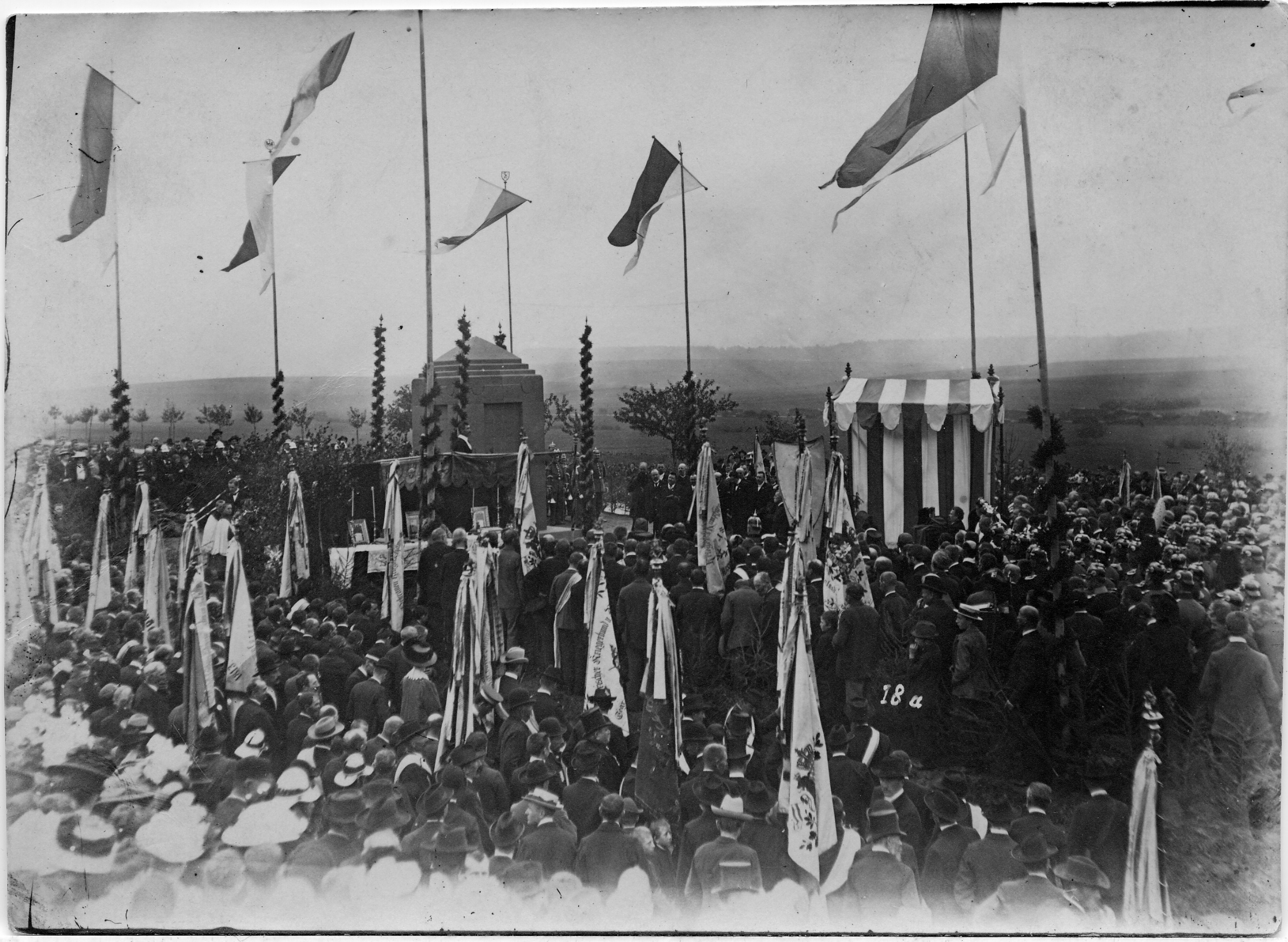
Ceremony for the unveiling of the Prince Ludwig Monument on 3 October 1909

In memory of the battle of Infantry Regiment No. 70, which was victorious for the Prussians, a march was composed by Albert Klaar and included in the army march collection as AM II, 204 Helmstadt March. Some monuments were erected in the area for those who fell in the battle, for example for members of the 3rd Brandenburg Infantry Regiment No. 20, the 2nd Thuringian Infantry Regiment No. 32, and the Bavarian troops as a whole. The wounding of Prince Ludwig of Bavaria, on the other hand, was later commemorated with the erection of the Prince Ludwig Memorial at the end of Helmstadt in the direction of Würzburg, which was unveiled on 3 October 1909 in the presence of the prince and veteran of the war of 1866 during a ceremony.

== Literature ==
- Heinz Helmert, Hans-Jürgen Usczeck: Preussisch-deutsche Kriege von 1864 bis 1871 – Militärischer Verlauf, 6. überarbeitete Auflage, Militärverlag der Deutschen Demokratischen Republik, Berlin 1988, ISBN 3-327-00222-3.
- Österreichs Kämpfe im Jahre 1866. Vom K.und K. Generalstab. Bureau für Kriegsgeschichte, 5. Band, Wien 1869, S. 146–155 online in der Google-Buchsuche
- Fidel von Baur-Breitenfeld: Die Operationen des achten deutschen Bundesarmeekorps im Feldzug des Jahres 1866, Darmstadt und Leipzig 1868 online bei der Bayerischen Staatsbibliothek
- Der Feldzug von 1866 in Deutschland. Kriegsgeschichtliche Abteilung des großen Generalstabes, Berlin 1867, S. 661–669 online in der Google-Buchsuche
- Antheil der königlich bayerischen Armee am Kriege des Jahres 1866, bearbeitet vom Generalquartiermeister-Stabe, München 1868, S. 166–177 online in der Google-Buchsuche
- Theodor Fontane: Der deutsche Krieg von 1866. 2. Band: Der Feldzug in West- und Mitteldeutschland. Berlin 1871, S. 228–234 online in der Google-Buchsuche
