= Battle of Gerchsheim =

Battle of the Austro-Prussian War

- Part of Austro-Prussian War
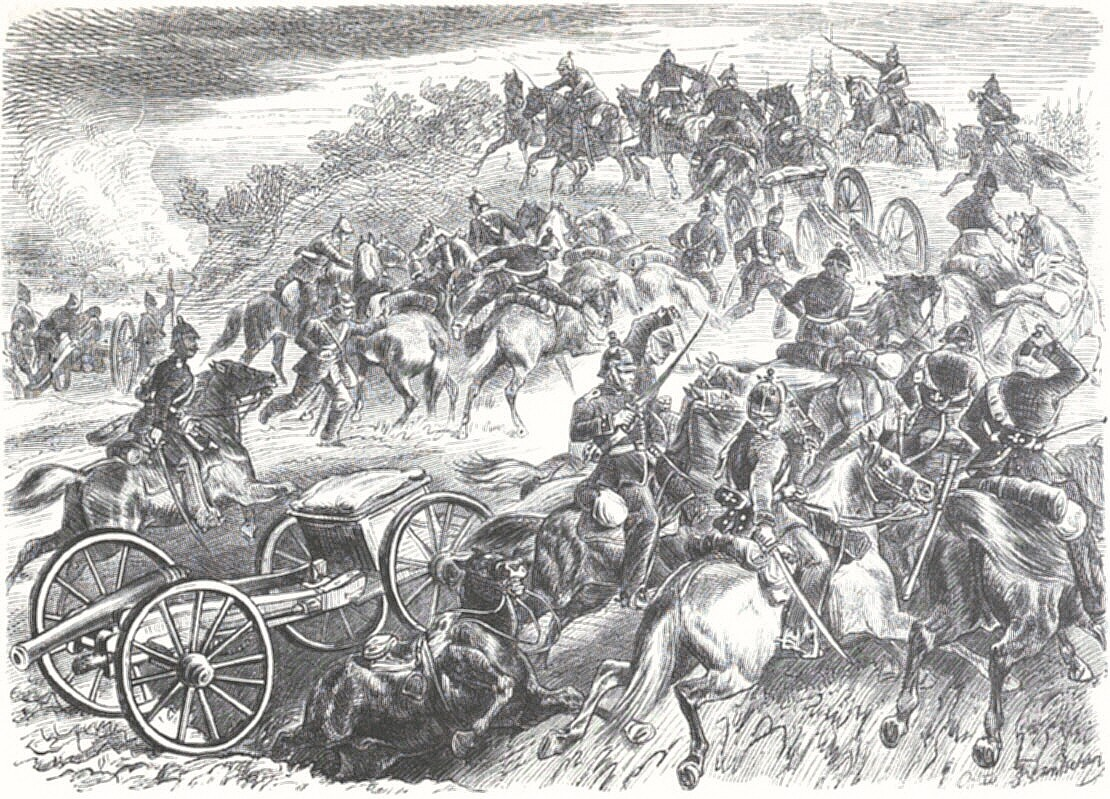
- Artillery battle near Gerchsheim on July 25, 1866
Date	July 25, 1866
Location	Gerchsheim, Baden 49°41′11″N 9°47′02″E
Result	Prussian Alliance victory

Belligerents
Prussia; Oldenburg	Austrian Empire; Baden; Württemberg; Hesse-Darmstadt; Nassau

Commanders and leaders
Edwin von Manteuffel; August von Goeben	Prince Alexander von Hesse-Darmstadt; General von Faber; General von Fischer; General Roth

Units involved
Regiment No. 13	VIII Army Corps

Strength
16,000 soldiers	26,000 soldiers

Casualties and losses
8 dead; 51 wounded; 1 missing person	13 dead; 89 wounded; 151 missing people
- Location within Baden-Württemberg Battle of Gerchsheim (Germany)

The Battle of Gerchsheim was an artillery battle during the Austro-Prussian War as part of the Campaign of the Main on July 25, 1866, between the Prussian Alliance and the German Federal Army.

== Background ==
After his march into Frankfurt (July 16), the commander of the Prussian Army on the Main, Eduard Vogel von Falckenstein, was recalled and replaced by Edwin von Manteuffel. The Prussian army was also increased to 60,000 men. From July 21, the Prussians marched from Frankfurt towards Würzburg to prevent the unification of the Federal Army. After crossing the Odenwald, there were a series of battles with Baden, Hessian and Württemberg units of the VIII Corps of the Federal Army on the Tauber until July 24. The 8th Federal Corps, consisting of four divisions under the command of Alexander von Hessen-Darmstadt, was divided into the following places on July 24:

- The (Württemberg) division near Tauberbischofsheim under Lieutenant General Oskar von Hardegg
- The (Baden) Division near Werbach under Lieutenant General Prince Wilhelm of Baden
- The (Hesse-Darmstadt) Division near Großrinderfeld under Lieutenant General von Perglas
- The (Austrian - Nassau) division near Grünsfeld - Paimar under Field Marshal Lieutenant Erwin von Neipperg

The front was directed to the west and this battle line-up was based on the assumption that the Bavarian Army Corps would extend this line to the north, as had been agreed on July 19 in Tauberbischofsheim between the VII and VIII Army Corps. The VII Army Corps of the Federal Army was formed by the Bavarian Army. This corps under Prince Karl of Bavaria was in the Würzburg area. Prince Karl was also the commander-in-chief of the federal troops in southern Germany and the aim was to lead the two federal corps into battle against the Prussian Main Army.

The Prussian Main Army consisted of three divisions under Edwin von Manteuffel who were in the following positions on July 25 at 10 a.m.:

- 13th Infantry Division under Lieutenant General August Karl von Goeben - near Bischofsheim
- 25th Infantry Brigade under Ferdinand von Kummer
- 26th Infantry Brigade under Karl von Wrangel

== Participating organizations ==
In this local battle on July 25, 1866 (about three weeks after the decisive Battle of Königgrätz) near Gerchsheim, the 13th Infantry Division (Goeben) and the 8th Federal Army Corps under the command of Prince Alexander of Hesse-Darmstadt .

Order of Battle of the participating associations in a contemporary representation:

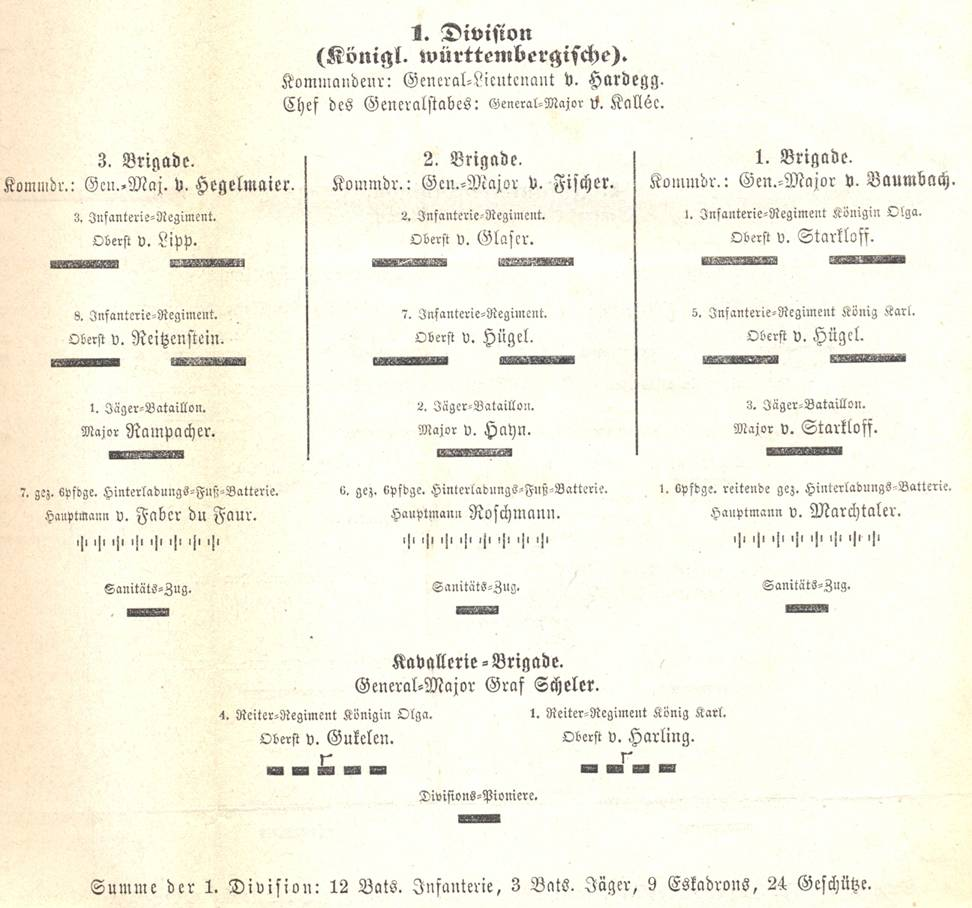
1st (Württ.) Division in the VIII Federal Army Corps, 1866

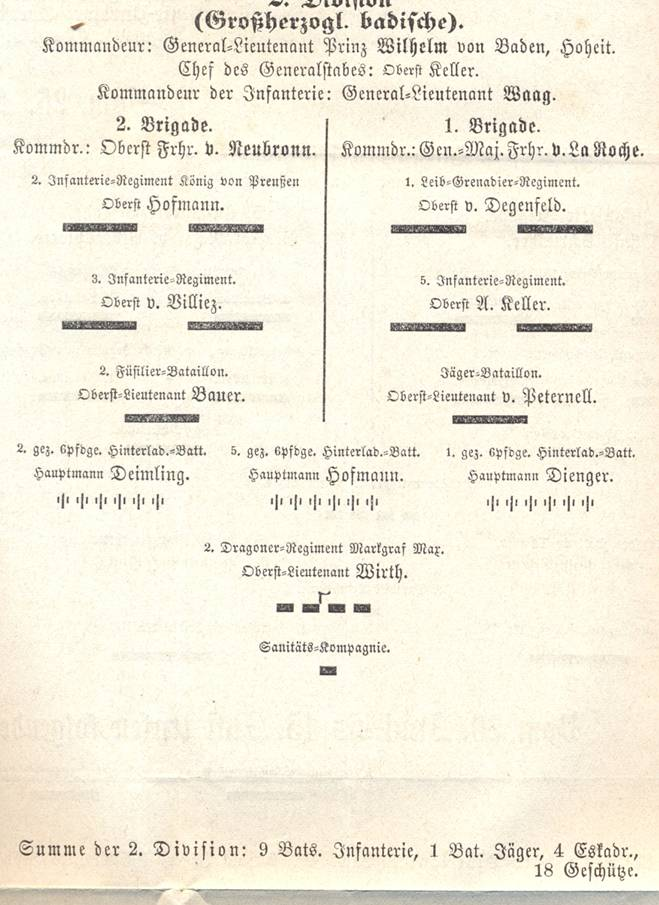
2nd (Bad.) Division in the VIII Federal Army Corps, 1866

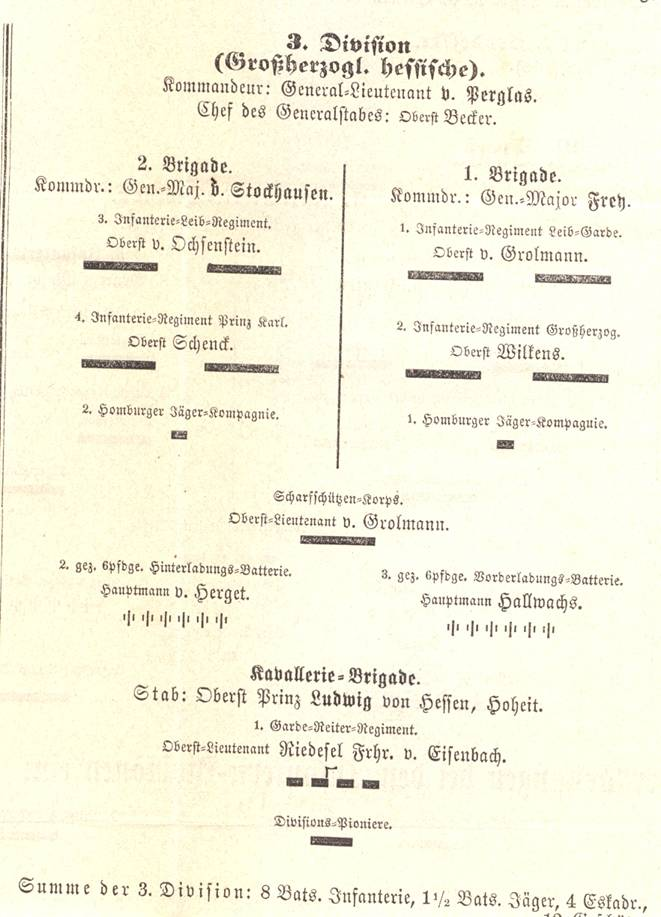
3rd (Hess.) Division in the VIII Federal Army Corps 1866

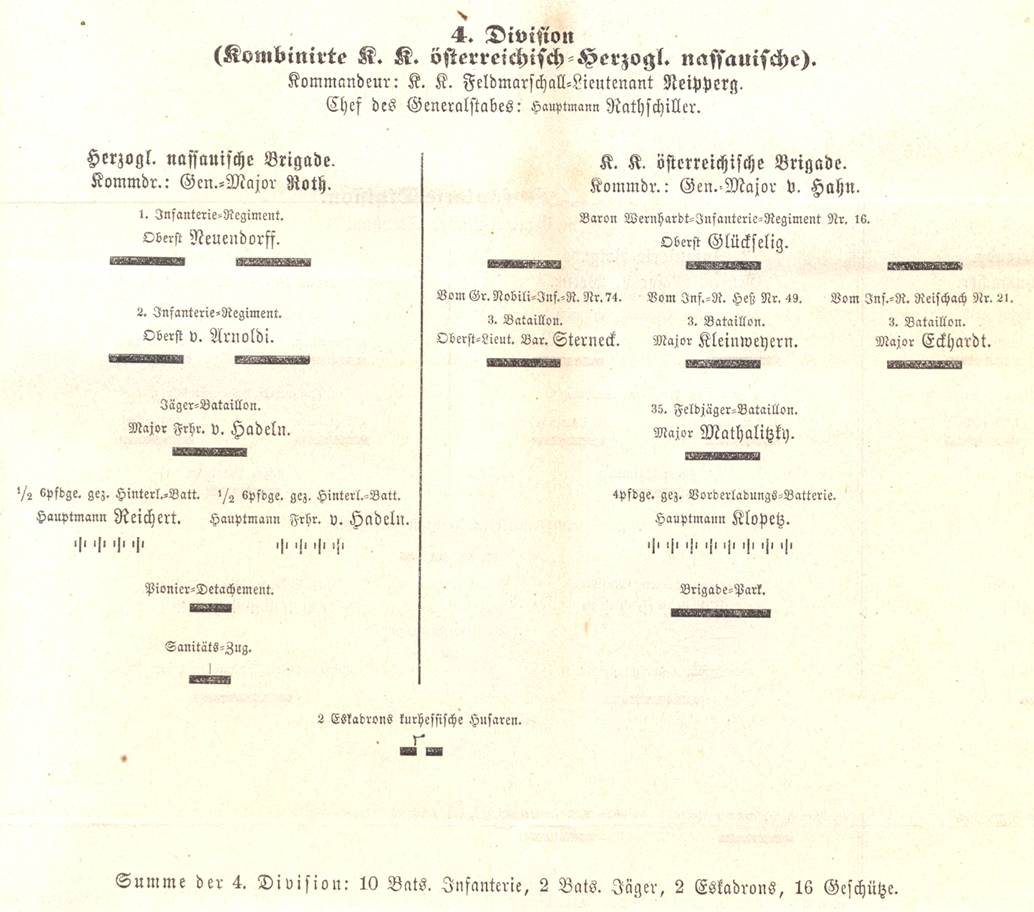
4th (combined) division in the VIII Federal Army Corps, 1866

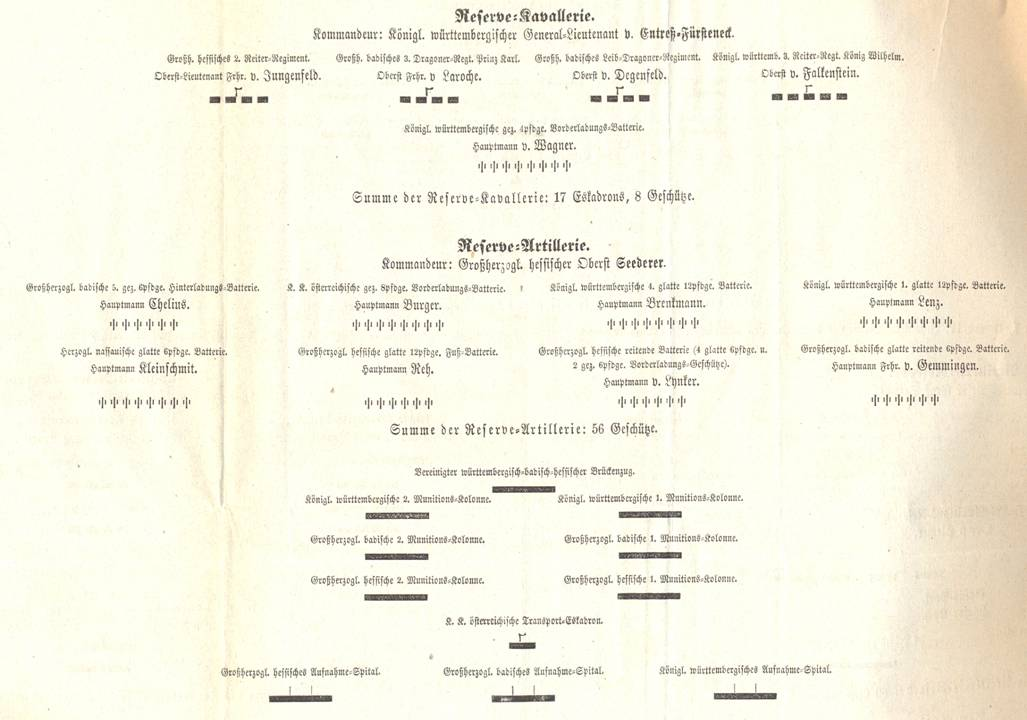
Reserve cavalry and reserve artillery in the VIII Federal Army Corps, 1866

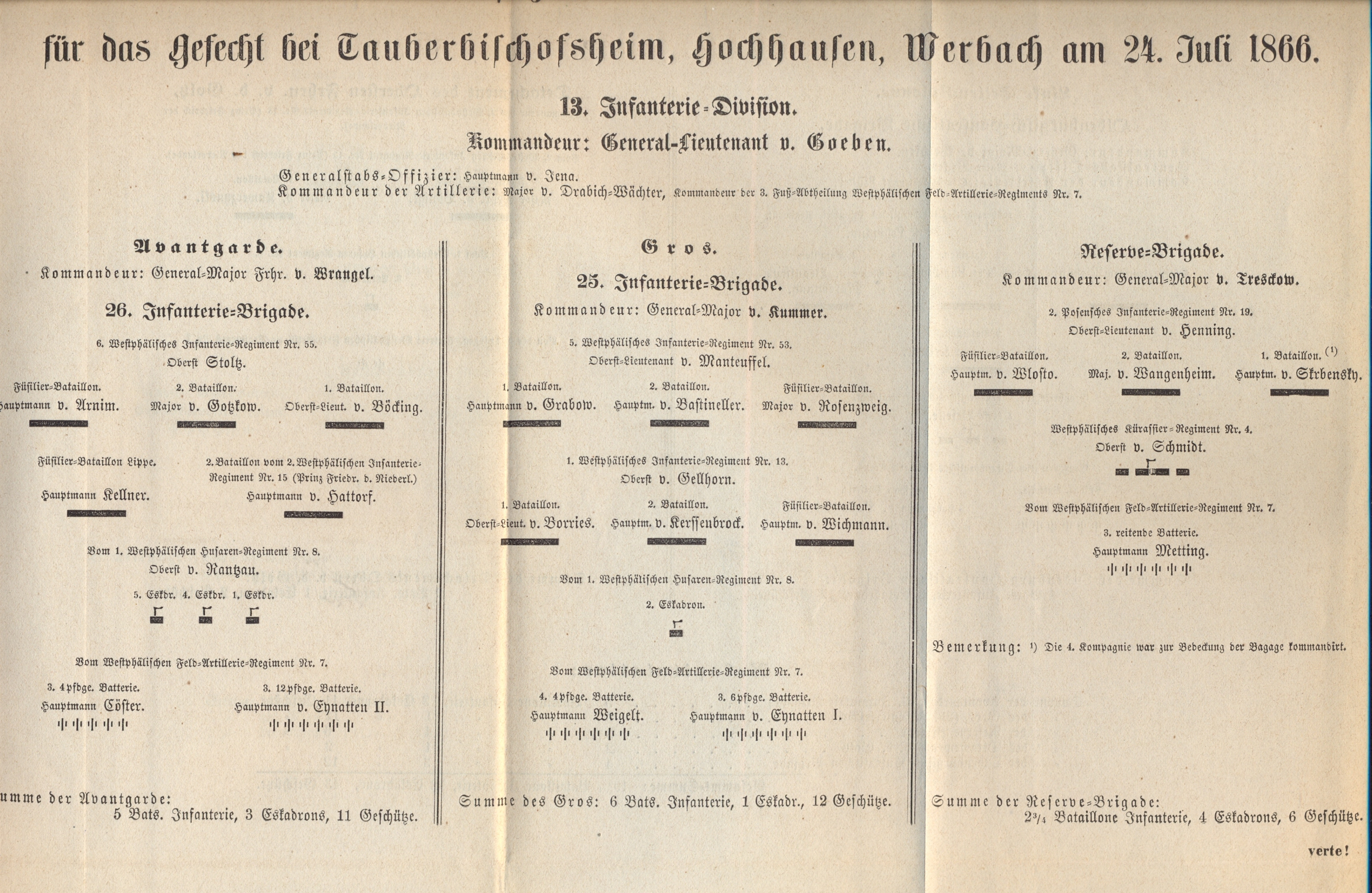
13th Infantry Division (Goeben) 1866

== Starting Positions ==
The combined Prussian division Flies was supposed to advance from Urphar to Dertingen on July 25 and explore in the direction of Remlingen, since the position of the Bavarian corps was unclear. The combined Prussian division Beyer should take positions at Neubrunn and the Prussian division Goeben should advance over Großrinderfeld.

The VIII. Army Corps expected to join forces with the Bavarian Corps to take the offensive against the Prussian Main Army. After the VIII. Corps received the message around 11 o'clock that the Bavarian troops in the north had withdrawn to Uettingen, Prince Alexander saw his right flank threatened and withdrew his corps onto the Gerchsheim - Altertheim line.

At 2 p.m. the divisions of the corps had taken up their new positions:

- 2nd (Baden) Division on the right wing near Oberaltertheim under Lieutenant General Prince Wilhelm von Baden
- 4th (Austrian-Nassau) division on the heights northwest of Gerchsheim under Field Marshal Lieutenant Erwin von Neipperg
- 3rd (Grand Ducal Hessian) division behind Gerchsheim in the 2nd meeting under Lieutenant General von Perglas
- 1st (Württemberg) division behind Gerchsheim in the 2nd meeting under Lieutenant General Oskar von Hardegg

At about 1 p.m. Prince Alexander had received news from Prince Karl that two Bavarian divisions were advancing in the north and that the VIII. Corps was supposed to be advancing back onto the Tauber line. The news and orders came too late for Prince Alexander that his divisions were already moving backwards.

The Goeben division began the advance on the road to Würzburg at 1 p.m., with the 25th Infantry Brigade under Major General von Kummer forming the avant-garde, followed by the Oldenburg-Hanseatic Brigade Weltzien and the Reserve Brigade under Major General von Tresckow. The 26th Infantry Brigade under Major General von Wrangel covered the right flank during the march.

== The Battle ==
Before leaving the Hachtelwald (halfway between Großrinderfeld and Gerchsheim), the Kummer Brigade noticed the units of the VIII Corps set up near Gerchsheim. Goeben had the brigade deployed in the forest and at the same time had the Wrangel von Ilmspan brigade advance into the left flank of the VIII Corps. The 13th and 53rd Infantry RegimentsThe Kummer Brigade occupied the edge of the forest and the Prussians brought up two gun batteries. Two Austrian and one Nassau batteries immediately took the Prussian guns under fire from a distance of more than two kilometers, with the Prussians not only suffering losses, but also several guns severely damaged. After two Württemberg batteries from the VIII Corps intervened in the battle, the Prussians had to withdraw their batteries behind the forest after 45 minutes. The artillery now fired at the infantry positions at the edge of the forest in order to then advance with the Nassau Brigade to attack. Once again the Prussian needle gun proved itselfan advantage and the Nassau Brigade broke off their attack 400 meters from the edge of the forest. The artillery of the VIII. Corps continued to bombard the edge of the forest, but Prince Alexander did not manage to lead his Württemberg and Hessian divisions to another attack - the Württemberg had already withdrawn as far as Kist . At around 7 p.m., Wrangel's Brigade intervened from Schönfeld . His battery Coester fired at the artillery of the VIII Corps and parts of the 15th Infantry Regimentgot into a firefight with Hessian troops. The artillery of Prince Alexander now shot itself at the new enemy, whereupon Goeben had the batteries retreated behind the forest and the battery of the Oldenburg Brigade advance again and opened artillery fire on the enemy batteries from the edge of the forest. In addition, the Kummer and Weltzien Brigades advanced and the VIII Corps did not hold out, but withdrew to Irtenberg .

In the meantime, Prince Alexander had received news of the Bavarian defeat at Helmstadt and retreating parts of the Bavarian army began to block the retreat routes of the VIII Corps, which were also endangered by the Wrangel Brigade. The Hessian division and the 2nd brigade of the Württemberger were supposed to cover the withdrawal of the VIII Corps. This retreat was orderly at the beginning, but it degenerated into chaos in the forest, which, however, was not noticed by the Prussians and therefore not exploited.

At the forester's lodge Irtenberg there was another infantry battle between units of the Wrangel Brigade and a Hessian, Württemberg and Baden battalion, which were commanded by the commander of the 2nd Württemberg Brigade, Major General von Fischer. The darkness falling at 9 p.m. saved the VIII. Corps from a major disaster and ended the battle.

The Goeben division moved to their night camp near Gerchsheim, the VIII. Corps near Kist, whereby the reserve troops were already withdrawn to Höchberg and Reichenberg near Würzburg.

== Aftermath ==
On July 26, the VIII. Corps withdrew to Würzburg in a desolate state and Prince Karl of Bavaria had to abandon his plan for a joint offensive of both federal corps on July 26. While the Bavarians were gathering on the plateau of Waldbüttelbrunn, the VIII. Corps took up positions on the Nikolausberg in front of Würzburg, in order to cover a retreat of the Bavarians across the Main. While the Bavarians were still fighting the battles at Uettingen and Roßbrunn to prevent - in vain - a Prussian occupation of Würzburg, Austria concluded the preliminary peace of Nikolsburg on July 26 with Prussia separately - without its allies, whereby his consent to any territorial claims was given in advance, which Prussia would enforce in the individual negotiations with the southern German Central Powers.

== Legacy ==
There is a memorial to the fallen Württemberg warriors in the Gerchsheimer Friedhof. The monument consists of a conical column (pyramid). There is a cross on the upper part and a lantern in front of it. The memorial text is on the lower part, two palm branches are located below. The inscription reads: In honor of the 12 Württemberg warriors who died on July 25, 1866.

There is another memorial stone on the L 578 in the direction of Großrinderfeld. This commemorates two fallen Prussian soldiers in the battle near Gerchsheim.

In the Tauberbischofsheimer Friedhof a grave with a memorial cross was erected for a Nassau non-commissioned officer who was wounded in Gerchsheim and later died in Tauberbischofsheim.

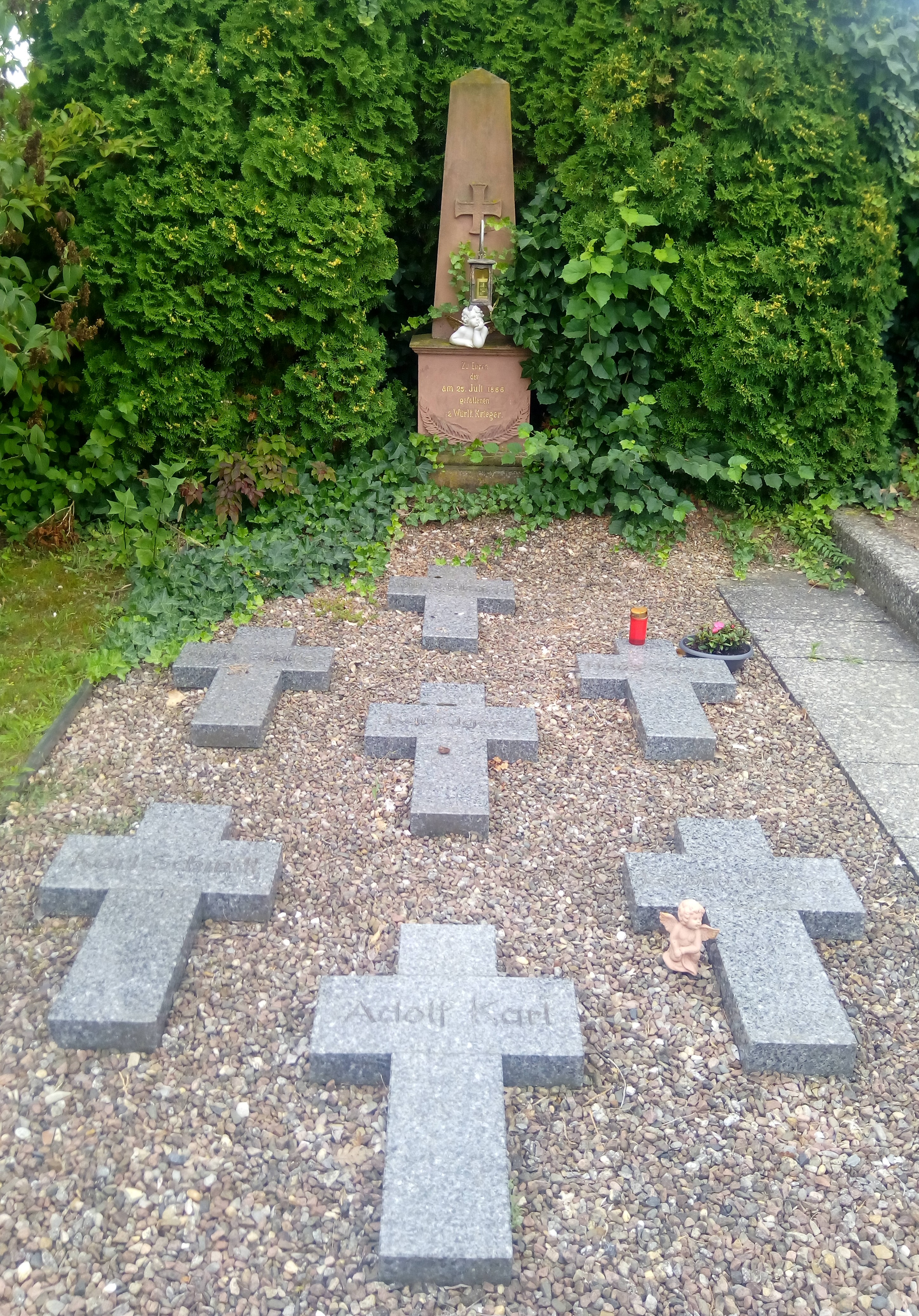
Gerchsheim cemetery, Württemberg soldiers' graves and memorial

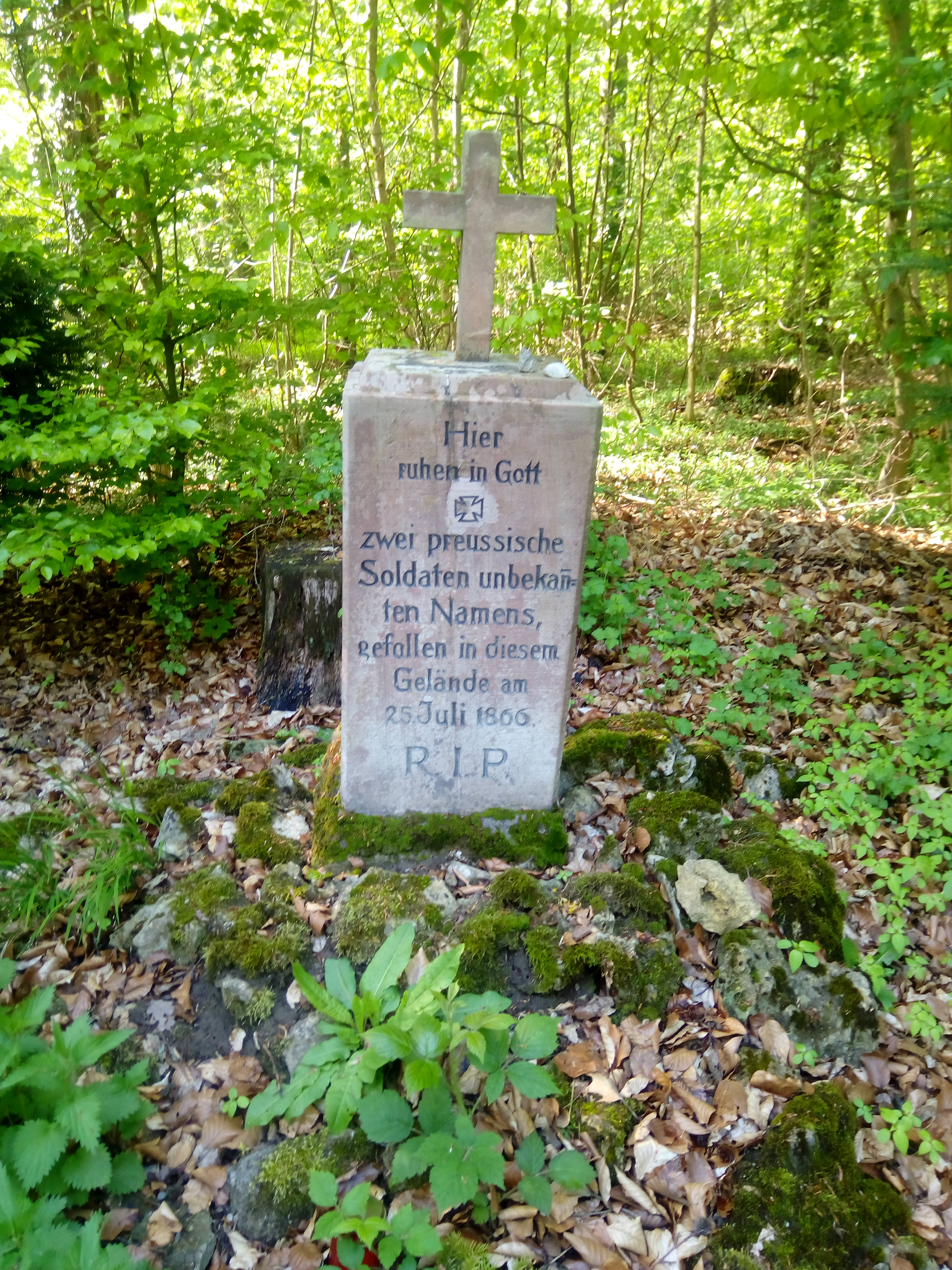
Soldier grave for two Prussian soldiers

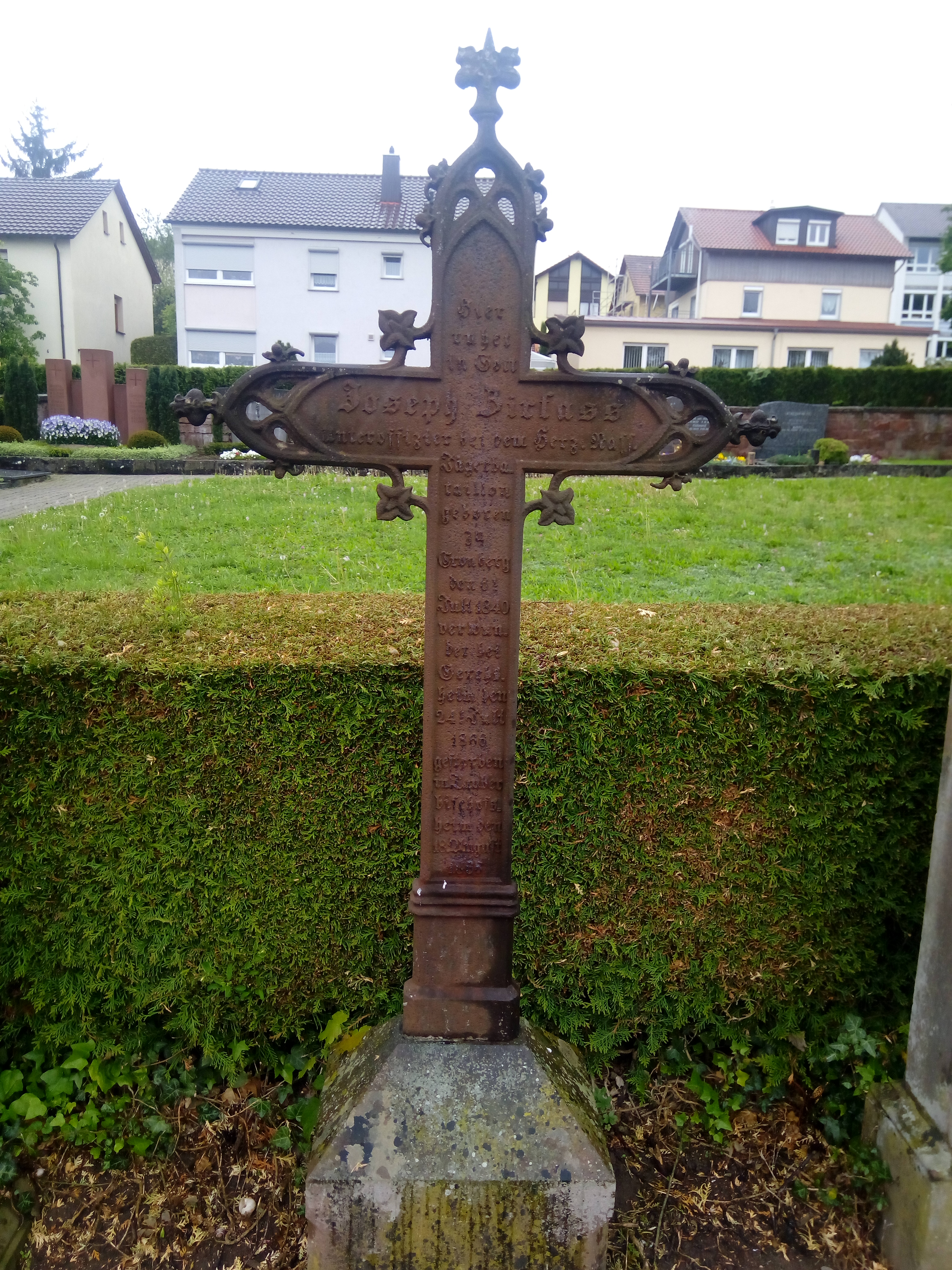
Soldier grave for a Nassau non-commissioned officer

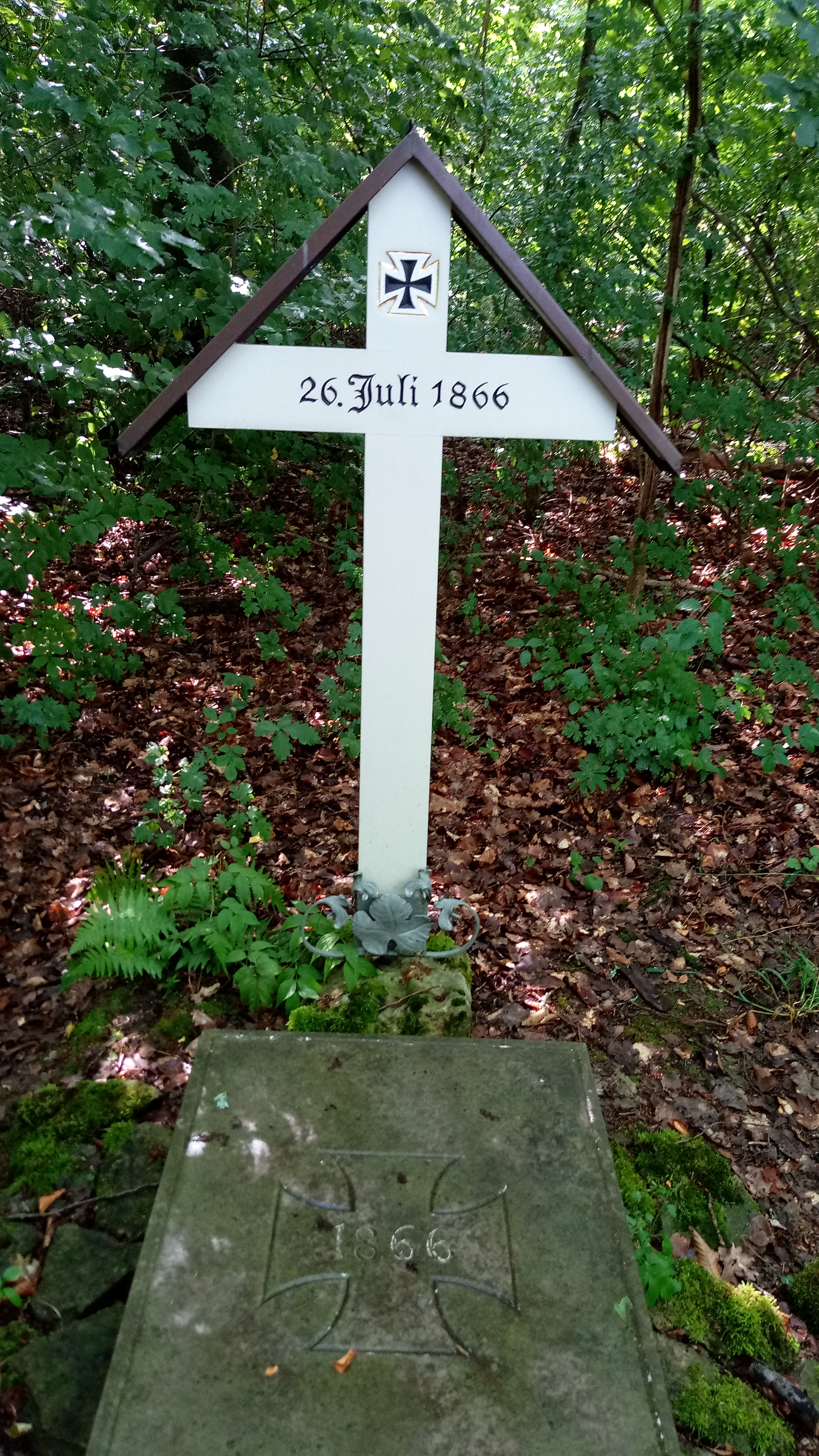
Soldier grave near forester's house Irtenberg. After the actual battle, a rearguard battle between the 8th Federal Corps and pursuing Prussians took place in this forest.
