= Helmstadt =

- Municipality
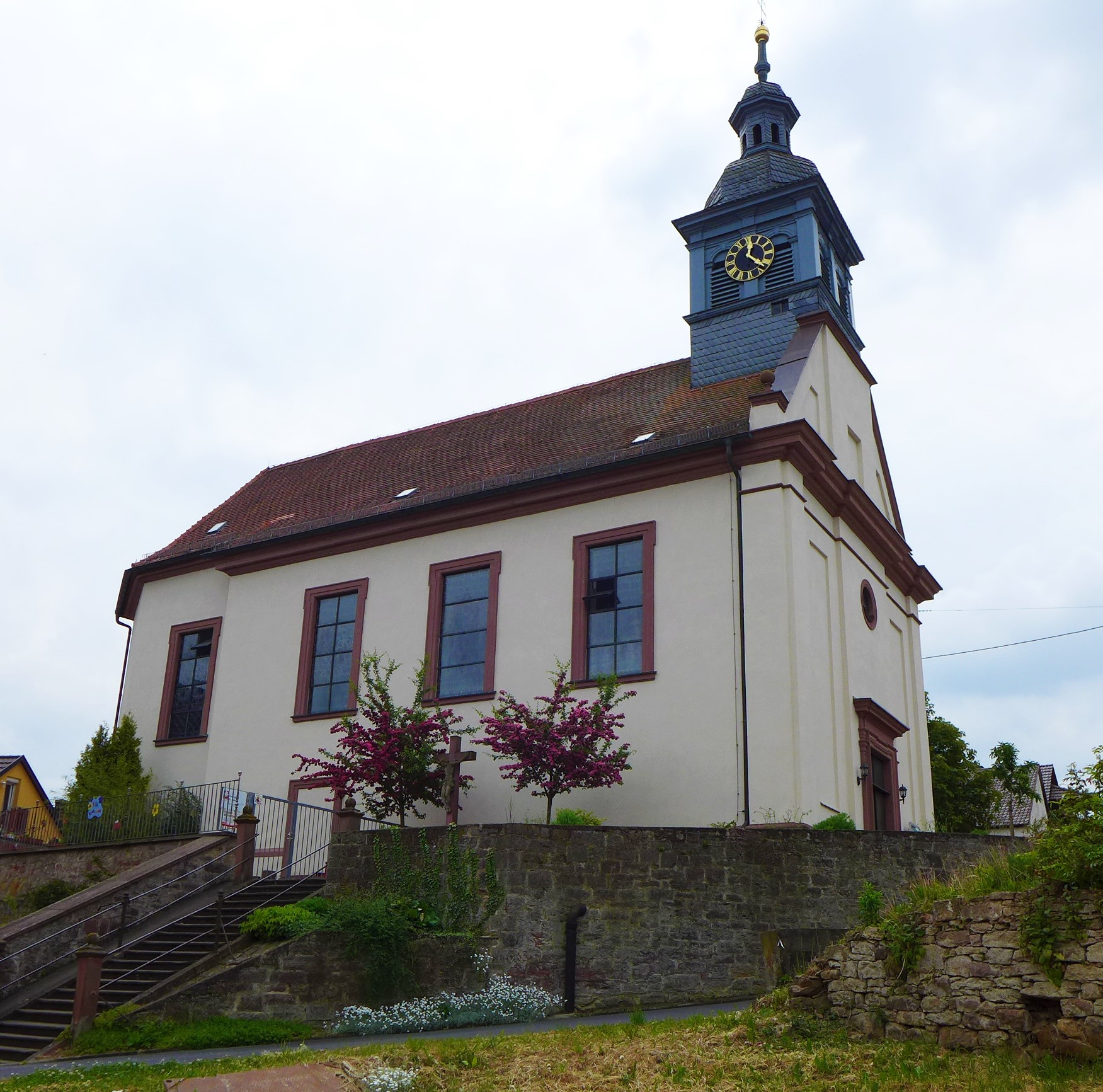
- Church of Saint Aegidius in Holzkirchhausen

- Coat of arms

- Location of Helmstadt within Würzburg district
- Interactive map of Helmstadt
- Location within Germany Location within Bavaria
- Coordinates: 49°45′41″N 9°42′27″E
- Country: Germany
- State: Bavaria
- Admin. region: Lower Franconia
- District: Würzburg
- Municipal assoc.: Helmstadt

Government
  - Mayor (2020–26): Tobias Klembt (CSU)

Area
  - Total: 22.80 km^{2} (8.80 sq mi)
- Elevation: 301 m (988 ft)

Population (2025-12-31)
  - Total: 2,517
  - Density: 110.4/km^{2} (285.9/sq mi)
- Time zone: UTC+01:00 (CET)
  - Summer (DST): UTC+02:00 (CEST)
- Postal codes: 97264
- Dialling codes: 09369
- Vehicle registration: WÜ
- Website: www.helmstadt-ufr.de

Helmstadt is a municipality in the Lower Franconian district of Würzburg in Bavaria in Germany.

== Geography ==
=== Municipal structure ===
Helmstadt consists of two districts:

- Helmstadt
- Holzkirchhausen

=== Neighboring municipalities ===
- Holzkirchen
- Uettingen
- Waldbüttelbrunn
- Irtenberger Wald
- Altertheim
- Neubrunn
- Wertheim

== Name ==
=== Etymology ===
The name Helmstadt consists of the first name Adalhalm and the Old High German word stat. It thus means dwelling of Adalhalm.

=== Historical spellings ===
- 770 Adalhalmestat
- 816 Halabingestat
- 1246 Helbingestat
- 1305 Heblingestat
- 1335 Helmstat
- 1559 Helmstadt
- 1800 Markthelmstadt
- 1831 Helmstadt

== History ==
=== Early history ===
A first settling of the region took place at the time of the Linear Pottery culture between 6000 and 4000 BC, as evidenced by archeological findings at the Altersberg, Ameisenberg and in the Hochstatt. For the time after that, no findings are known. Another settlement at the Roth was established at the time of the Urnfield culture between 1200 and 750 BC. During the development of the Roth between 1999 and 2000 AD, excavations were conducted in the area, and numerous shard and pole pit findings were recorded. The existing settlement then grew in size between 750 and 450 BC, at the time of the Hallstatt culture. After that, however, any signs of a settlement disappeared.

=== Middle Ages ===
The area was only settled anew at the beginning of the Middle Ages. The settlers were so-called "Waldsassen"—people settling in the woods—after whom the region was also named in medieval times: Waldsassengau. A formal foundation of the village likely took place between 680 and 750 AD. The first documented mention of the village occurs in 772, under the name of "Adalhalmestat". On 20 January 772, the right to tithe the village and the neighboring Uettingen was transferred from the owner of the villages, a noble clergyman called Alwalah, to the Benedictine Fulda monastery. In the centuries that were to follow, the affiliated daughter monastery of Holzkirchen and the counts of Wertheim shared the power over the village. The associated parish was first mentioned in 1209. At the turn of the years 1466 and 1467, the village was burned down completely as a result of a feud between the count of Wertheim and the Teutonic Order.

=== Modern history ===
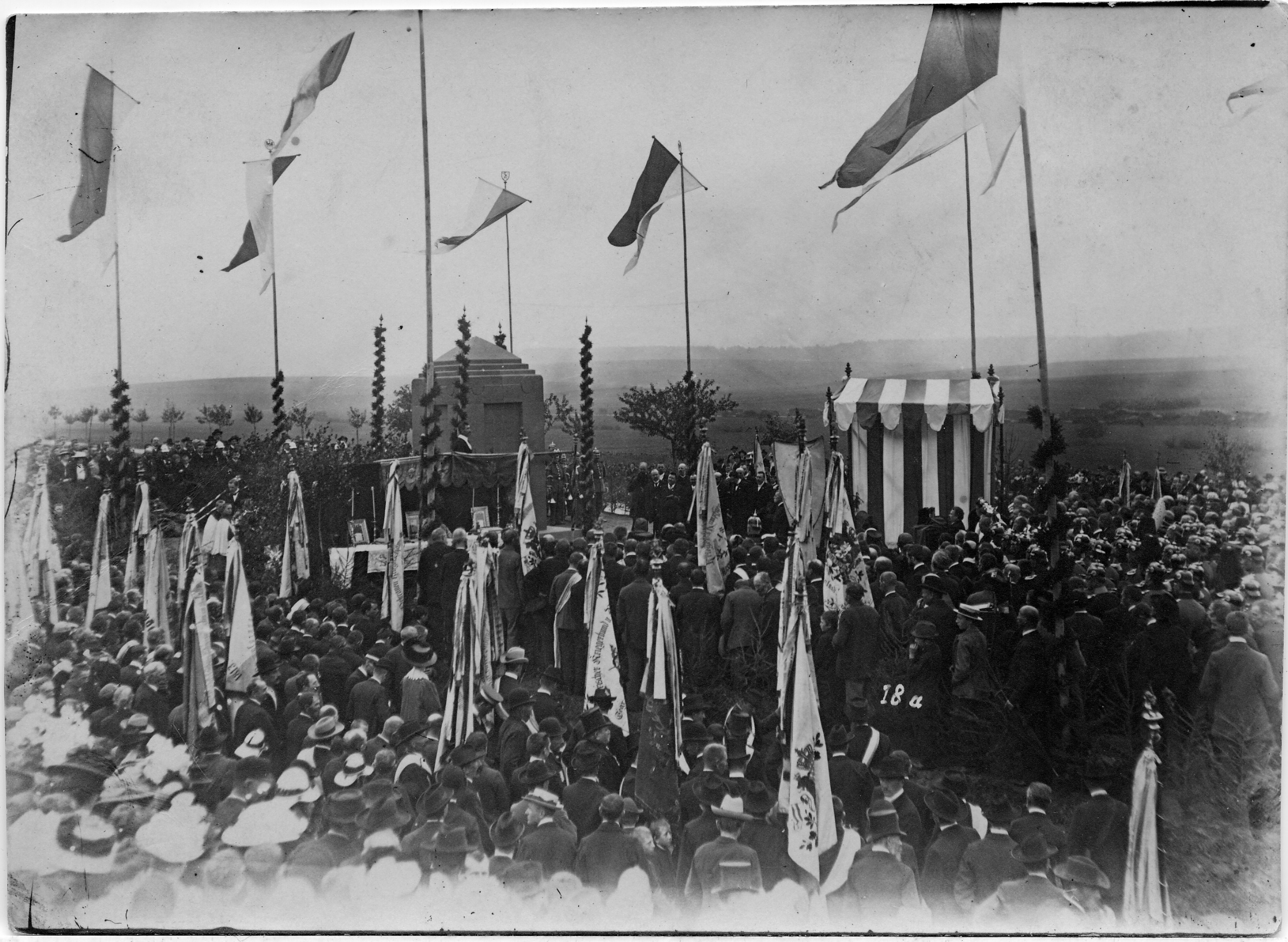
Opening ceremony on occasion of the unveiling of the Prinz Ludwig Memorial on 3 October 1909

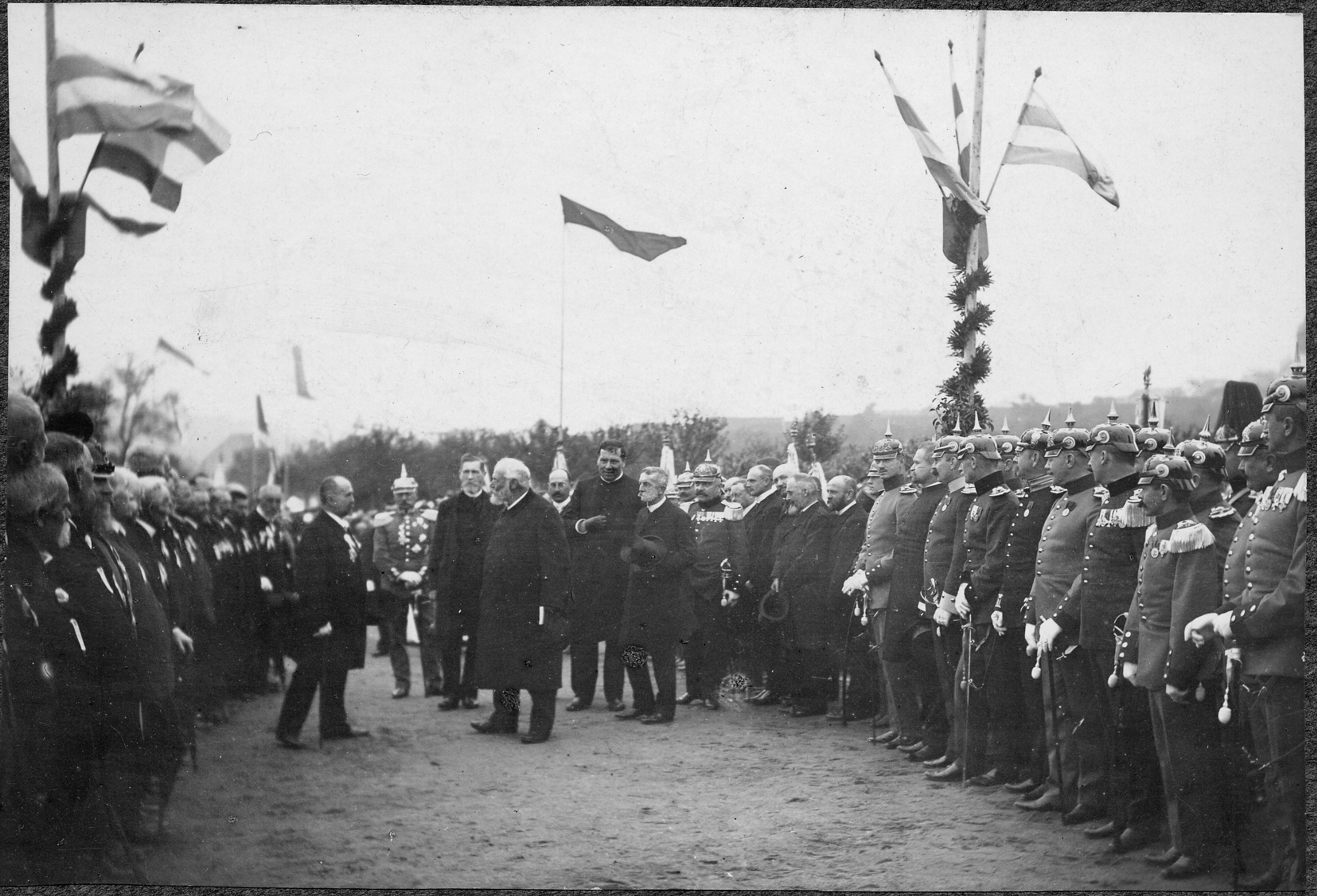
Prince Ludwig walking along the honor guard made up of war veterans

After the house of the counts of Wertheim had died out in the male line with the death of Michael III, the Bishopric of Würzburg claimed ownership of the village. In 1612, prince-bishop Julius Echter incorporated the village into the bishopric. The title of Vogt was passed down to the Nurembergian patrician families of Haller von Hallerstein, Imhof and von Buirette, who exercised this right until the beginning of the 19th century. During the Thirty Years' War, the village was repeatedly occupied and looted by troops of various affiliations. The right to organise markets was awarded to the village on 1 October 1770 by the prince-bishop of Würzburg and Bamberg, Adam Friedrich von Seinsheim.

During the Austro-Prussian War of 1866, a battle between royal Prussian and Bavarian troops allied with the Austrian Empire took place near the village on 25 July 1866. Prince Ludwig of Bavaria, who should later be crowned King Ludwig III of Bavaria, suffered a shot wound during the assault. In order to commemorate this occasion, a memorial named Prinz-Ludwig-Denkmal was erected near the village exit towards Würzburg. It was unveiled on 3 October 1909 in the presence of the Prince and veterans of the war of 1866.

During World War I, 48 soldiers from Helmstadt and 12 soldiers from Holzkirchhausen died at the frontlines. World War II claimed another 111 and 31 victims of the two villages. Apart from that, several disabled citizens were murdered by the Nazis. The village was liberated without resistance by approaching US-American troops on 2 April 1945, an Easter Monday.

=== Today ===
Helmstadt is a politically autonomous municipality. On 1 May 1978, the previously autonomous municipality of Holzkirchhausen was incorporated into Helmstadt as a result of a local government reorganization. This reorganization also resulted in Helmstadt being incorporated into the district of Würzburg. Previously, it had been part of the now dissolved district of Marktheidenfeld.

=== Population development ===
- 1961: 1.923
- 1970: 2.097
- 1987: 2.307
- 2000: 2.669
- 2004: 2.639
- 2011: 2.579
- 2015: 2.571

== Politics ==
Helmstadt has been the seat of the association of administrations of the same name since 1 May 1978. The association includes Helmstadt with Holzkirchhausen, Holzkirchen with Wüstenzell, Remlingen and Uettingen.

Since 20 November 2014, Helmstadt is organised in the so-called Allianz Waldsassengau, together with twelve surrounding municipalities. The association serves the promotion of intercommunal cooperation.

=== Coat of arms ===
The right to use a coat of arms was first granted to Helmstadt in 1589, by Louis III, Count of Löwenstein, then ruling count of Wertheim. Apart from three roses attributed to the county of Wertheim, the coat of arms also displays a tool handle, a so-called Halm or Helbling, which can also be found in some of the earlier names of Helmstadt. The blazon reads: "Three red six-petaled heraldic roses on a golden background, divided in one and two; between them, a horizontal blue tool handle".

=== Twin towns ===
Helmstadt is twinned with:

- Chiusi della Verna (Italy)

== Economy and infrastructure ==
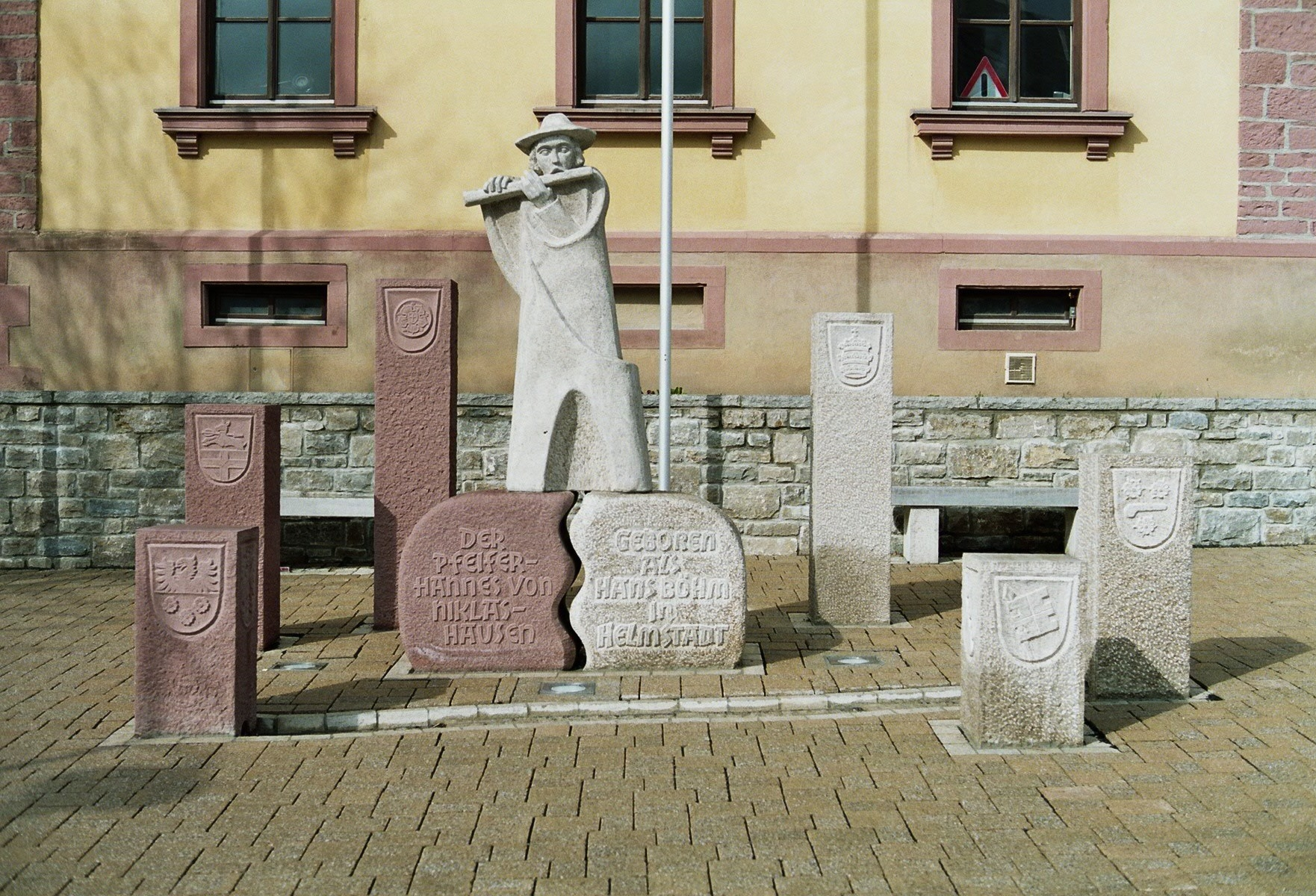
Memorial for Hans Böhm, erected in 2007

The village has both doctor and dentist's offices, a pharmacy, a kindergarten and a primary school. Various companies, including the Deutsche Post AG and banks, offer employment in the village.

=== Education ===
The following institutions exist (2015):

- Catholic kindergarten St. Josef (3 kindergarten groups with 75 children, 2 toddler groups with 24 children)
- Catholic kindergarten St. Ägidius (district of Holzkirchhausen, 1 kindergarten group with 15 children)
- Astrid Lindgren elementary school (elementary school association, 12 classes with about 280 pupils)

== Religion ==
Both Helmstadt and Holzkirchhausen are largely Catholic municipalities. Their rectories are organized in the parish association Pfarreiengemeinschaft Hl. Benedikt zwischen Tauber & Main, which has its seat in Helmstadt and which also includes the rectories of Böttigheim, Holzkirchen, Neubrunn, Uettingen, Remlingen, and Wüstenzell. The parish association, in turn, is part of the church district of Würzburg on the left side of the Main and is thus subject to the diocese of the bishopric of Würzburg. The Protestant inhabitants of the village are assigned to the rectory of St. Bartholomäus in Uettingen.

=== Churches ===
- Catholic parish church St. Martin
- Catholic church St. Ägidius (district of Holzkirchhausen)

== Notable people ==
- Hans Böhm (1458–1476), preacher, initiator of the pilgrimage to Niklashausen of 1476
- Jakob Baunach (–1627), mayor of Würzburg 1624-1625, beheaded and then burnt as a witch under Bishop Ehrenberg
- Adam Flasch (1844–1902), classical archeologist, professor for archeology
- Günther Kaunzinger (1938-), organist and pianist, living in Helmstadt
