= Wertheim am Main =

Wertheim
- Town
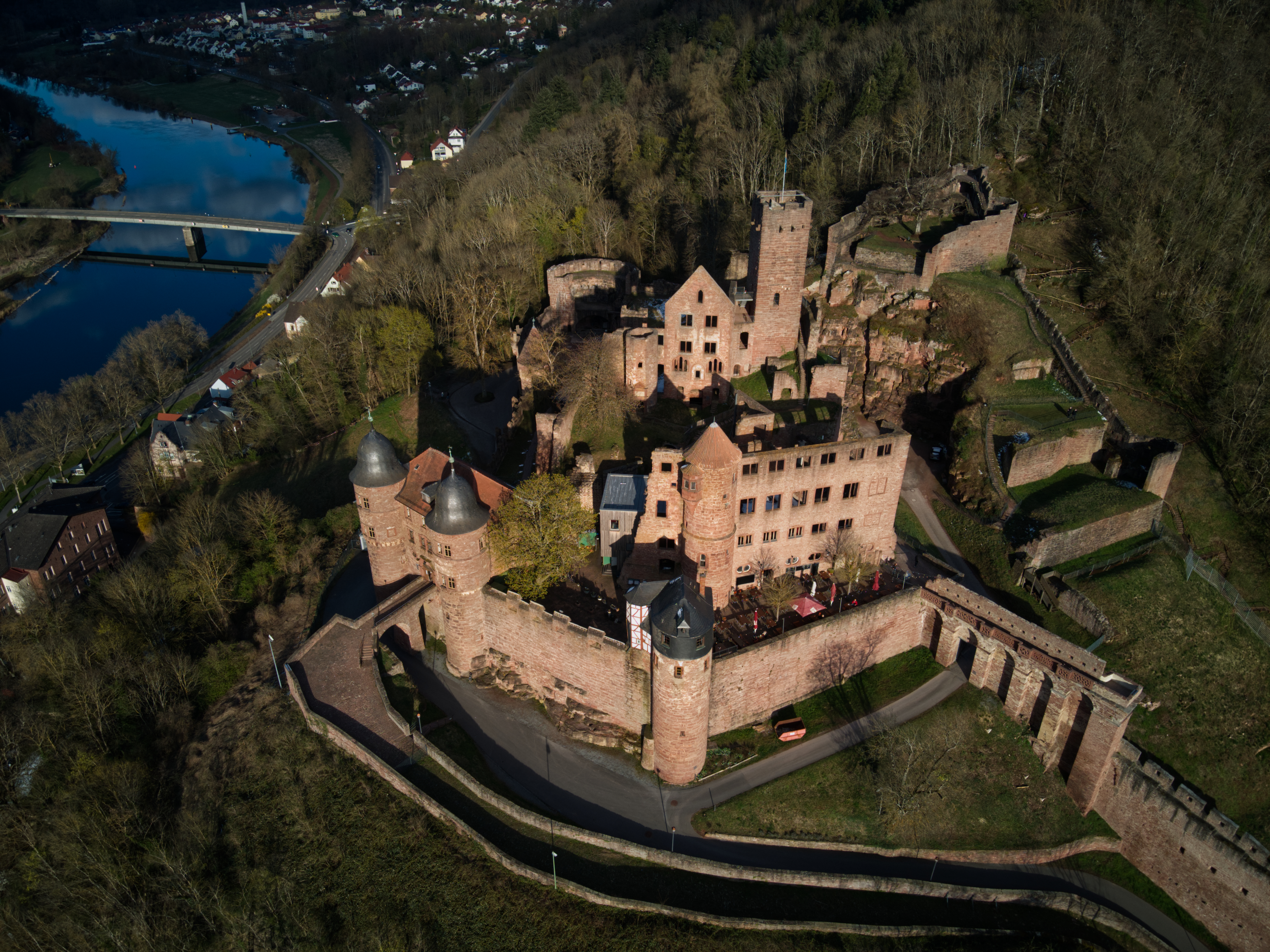
- Wertheim Castle

- Coat of arms

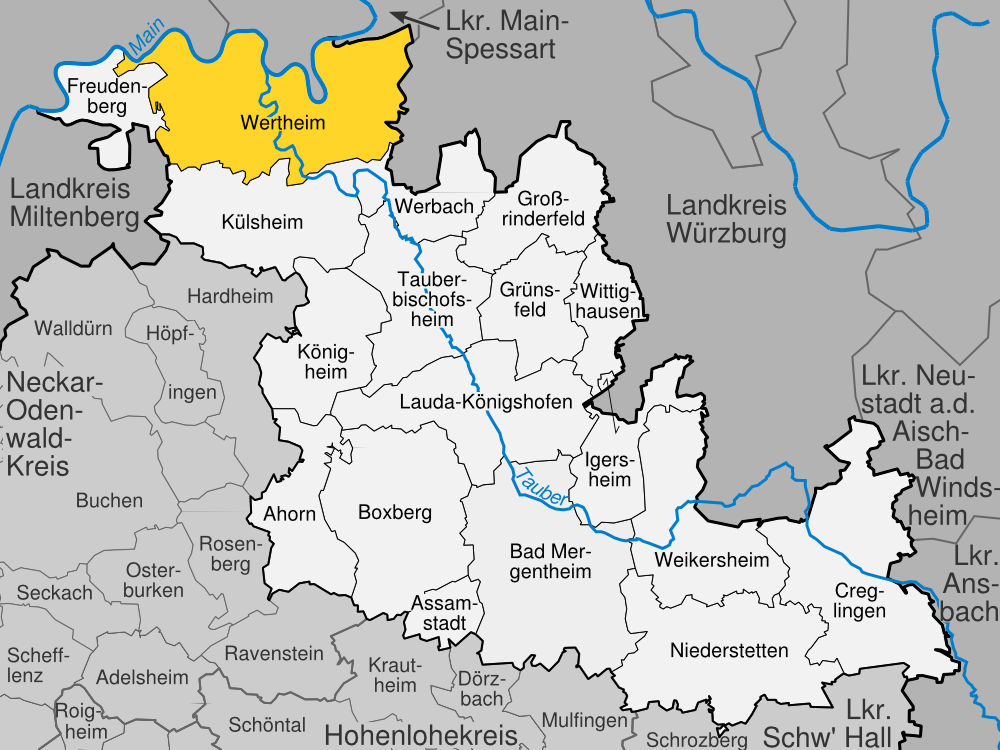
- Location of Wertheim within Main-Tauber-Kreis district
- Interactive map of Wertheim
- Location within Germany Location within Baden-Württemberg
- Coordinates: 49°45′32″N 09°31′03″E
- Country: Germany
- State: Baden-Württemberg
- Admin. region: Stuttgart
- District: Main-Tauber-Kreis
- Subdivisions: Kernstadt, 15 Ortschaften and 5 Stadtteile

Government
  - Mayor (2019–27): Markus Herrera Torrez (SPD)

Area
  - Total: 138.63 km^{2} (53.53 sq mi)
- Elevation: 145 m (476 ft)

Population (2025-12-31)
  - Total: 22,808
  - Density: 164.52/km^{2} (426.12/sq mi)
- Time zone: UTC+01:00 (CET)
  - Summer (DST): UTC+02:00 (CEST)
- Postal codes: 97877
- Dialling codes: 09342, 09397 (Dertingen)
- Vehicle registration: TBB, MGH
- Website: www.wertheim.de

Wertheim (German pronunciation: [ˈveːɐ̯thaɪm]; East Franconian: Wärde) is a town in southwestern Germany, in the state of Baden-Württemberg with a population of around 23,400. It is located on the confluence of the rivers Tauber and Main. Wertheim is best known for its landmark castle and medieval town centre.

== Geography ==
Wertheim is the most northerly town in the state of Baden-Württemberg. It is situated at the confluence of the rivers Tauber and Main, on the Main's left bank. It borders on the Odenwald hills and the Spessart range to the north across the river Main. Wertheim is located in the Main-Tauber district.

=== Neighboring communities ===
The following towns and communities border on Wertheim, listed clockwise starting in the east: Holzkirchen, Helmstadt and Neubrunn (all district Würzburg, Bavaria), Werbach and Külsheim (both Main-Tauber district), Neunkirchen (district Miltenberg, Bavaria), Freudenberg (Main-Tauber district), Stadtprozelten and Faulbach (both Miltenberg district) and Hasloch, Kreuzwertheim and Triefenstein (all Main-Spessart district, Bavaria).

== History ==
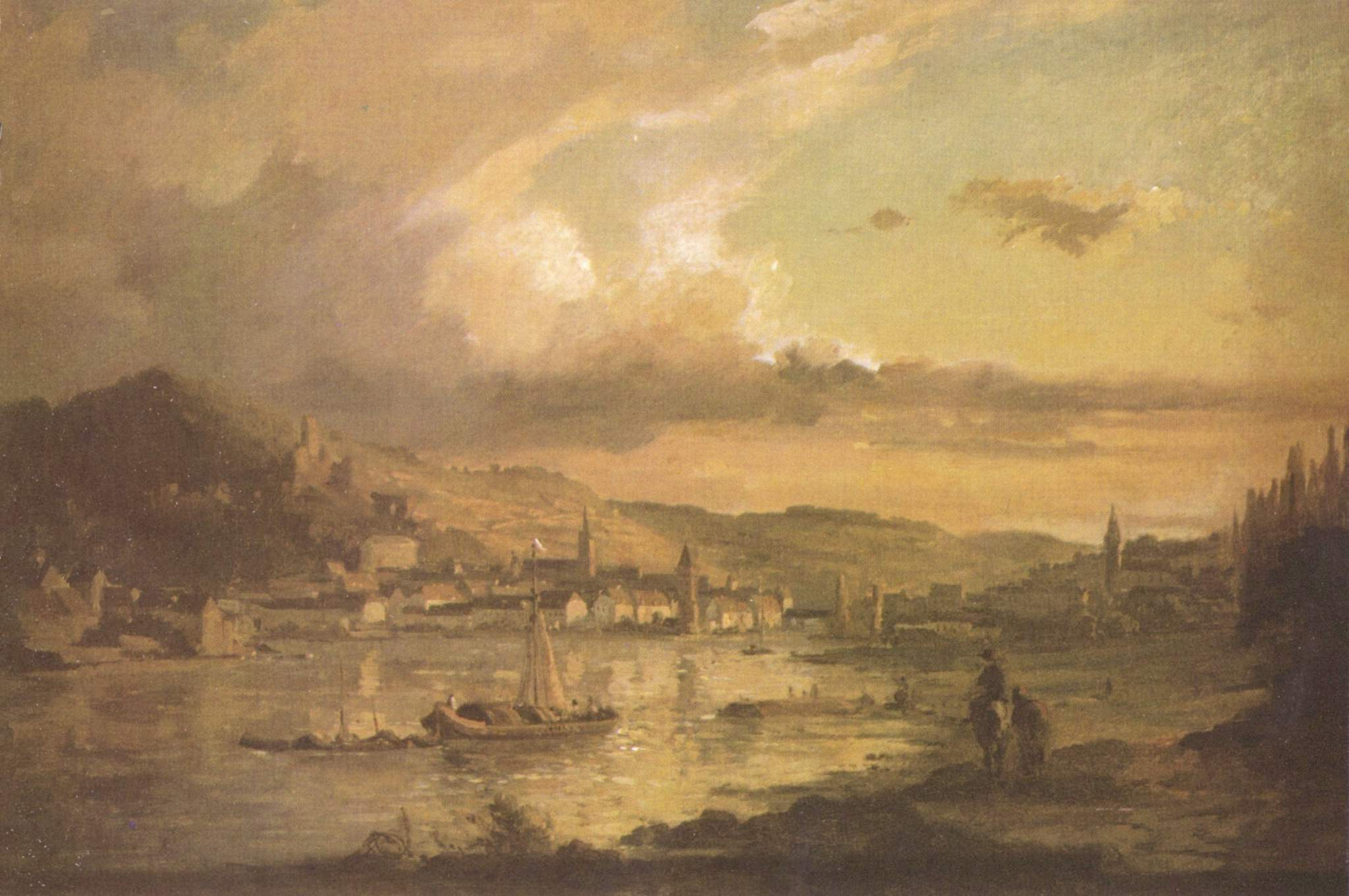
Wertheim a. M., Carl Anton Joseph Rottmann, 1822

Wertheim was founded between the 7th and 8th century. However, the first settlement was a town called Kreuzwertheim on the right bank of the river Main. From the early 12th century onwards, a branch of the noble family of the Reginbodons called themselves after the town. After the family of the Counts of Wertheim had built a castle on the left bank of the river Main, a settlement developed at the foot of this dominating structure that was called Wertheim. It was mentioned for the first time in 779. In 1192, it was referred to as Suburbium castri Wertheim and in 1200 the town was referred to as an oppidum and in 1244 as a civitas.

Count Eberhard of Wertheim reigned from the year 1355 to 1373. In 1363 Emperor Charles IV granted him by degree the right to mint coins. The last Count of Wertheim was Michael III. He married Katharina, the oldest daughter of Ludwig of Stolberg. Michael died without producing a male heir and consequently the county passed to Ludwig of Stolberg. In 1574, after the death of Ludwig, the county passed on to his son-in-law Count Ludwig of Löwenstein.

The town developed into the center of the County of Wertheim. The county was governed by the House of Löwenstein-Wertheim. In 1630, the house split into two lines: the older Protestant line Löwenstein-Wertheim-Virneburg and the Catholic line Löwenstein-Wertheim-Rochefort. The county existed until 1806 when it was divided as a consequence of the German mediatization (Reichsdeputationshauptschluss). The area left of the Main river was given to the Grand Duchy of Baden, while the territories right of the Main were given to the Kingdom of Bavaria.

Established in 1406, the cemetery of the former Jewish community is one of the oldest in Germany. In use up until the 20th century, it is the oldest existing Jewish cemetery in Baden-Württemberg.

For many years Wertheim was home to Peden Barracks, a US Army installation. The US Army left Peden Barracks in the early 1990s as part of the post Cold War reorganization of US armed forces in Germany.

In 1938, Wertheim was merged with Tauberbischofsheim into the newly created district Landkreis Tauberbischofsheim. From 1972 onwards, 15 communities were incorporated with Wertheim. These 15 communities are: Bettingen, Dertingen, Dietenhan, Dörlesberg, Grünenwört, Höhefeld, Kembach, Lindelbach, Mondfeld, Nassig, Reicholzheim, Sachsenhausen, Sonderriet, Urphar and Waldenhausen. As of 1 January 1973 the Landkreis Tauberbischofsheim was merged into the new Main-Tauber-Kreis. Due to the incorporation of surrounding communities, Wertheim reached the 20,000 population mark in 1975. Wertheim became a Große Kreisstadt (district town) on 1 January 1976.

== Demographics ==
Year	Number of Residents
1617	3,670
1792	3,373
1810	3,154
1833	3,633
1 December 1871	3,328
1 December 1880 ¹	4,567
1 December 1890 ¹	3,535
1 December 1900 ¹	3,670
1 December 1910 ¹	3,648
16 June 1925 ¹	3,673
16 June 1933 ¹	3,679
17 May 1939 ¹	5,434
December 1945	5,534
13 September 1950 ¹	9,789

Year	Number of Residents
6 June 1961 ¹	11,329
27 May 1970 ¹	12,029
31 December 1975	20,942
31 December 1980	19,972
27 May 1987 ¹	20,377
31 December 1990	21,627
31 December 1995	24,432
31 December 2000	24,332
31 March 2004	24,739
30 June 2005	24,553
30 June 2006	24,452
31 December 2006	24,302
30 June 2007	24,202
31 December 2010	23,552
31 December 2013	22,415
31 December 2014	22,461

¹ Census result

== Arts and culture ==
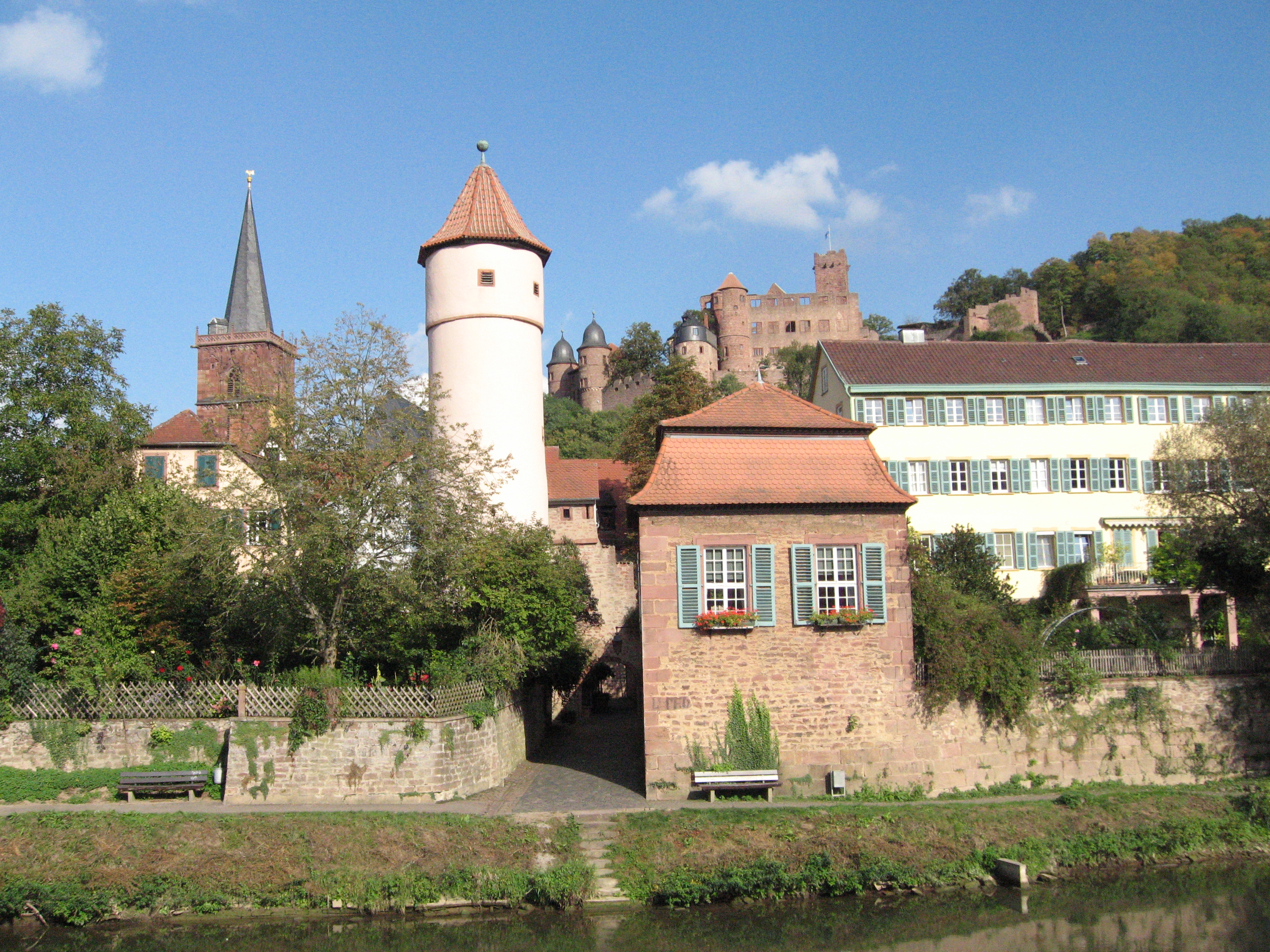
Kittsteintor

=== Museums ===
- Glasmuseum (glass museum)
- Grafschaftsmuseum

=== Events ===
Summer festival (Altstadtfest) on the last three days of July, followed by a medieval festival at the castle followed by the Wertheimer Messe (like Oktoberfest).

=== Buildings ===
Burg Wertheim (castle) is the landmark of the town. Wertheim has a medieval town center with half-timbered houses and small streets. The Gothic Stiftskirche was built in 1383 (today it is a Protestant parish church). Two clocks can be seen on the clock tower, one with an hour hand only, for the residents of the castle. The Kilianskapelle, a Gothic chapel, was constructed after 1469. The Engelsbrunnen ("Angels' well") from 1574 was built of the red sandstone typical of this area and derives its name from two little angels holding Wertheim's coat of arms.

Other sights include the Kittsteintor with flood markings from 1595 onwards and the Blaues Haus ("Blue house").

The outlying Stadtteil of Urphar features a medieval fortified church, Jakobskirche.

Located not far from Wertheim in the Tauber valley is Bronnbach Abbey, or Kloster Bronnbach, founded in 1150. The late-Romanesque and early-Gothic basilica was consecrated in 1222.

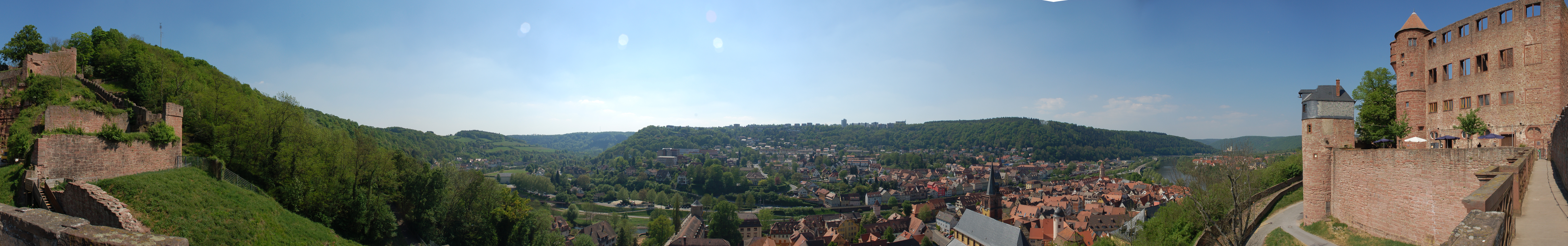
360° panoramic view of the castle and the town

== Economy ==
The glass manufacturing tradition in Wertheim and its surroundings dates back several centuries.

== Governance ==
=== Mayors (Bürgermeister) ===
- 1810–1827: Johann Christoph Schlundt
- 1827–1829: Christoph Michael Platz
- 1829–1832: Johann Georg Weimar
- 1832–1839: Johann Friedrich Bach
- 1839–1840: Christoph Wilhelm Müller
- 1840–1845: Johann Jakob von Runkel
- 1845–1852: Ludwig Haas
- 1852–1860: Johann Jakob von Runkel
- 1860–1866: Ludwig Haas
- 1866–1871: Philipp Frank
- 1871–1880: Lorenz Meyer
- 1880–1890: Philipp Amthauer
- 1890–1895: Philipp Mayer
- 1895–1905: Michael Müller
- 1905–1933: Hans Bardon
- 1933–1938: Friedrich Bender
- 1938–1943: Hans Mensler
- 1944–1945: Hermann Dürr
- 1945: Carl Roth
- 1945–1946: Michael Beck
- 1946: Otto Hoog
- 1946–1961: Carl Roth
- 1961–1981: Karl Josef Scheuermann
- 1981–2003: Stefan Gläser
- 2003–2019: Stefan Mikulicz
- 2019–present: Markus Herrera Torrez

=== Coat of arms ===
The coat of arms of Wertheim, shows a parted shield the upper part in gold with a black eagle and below in blue three silver roses. The city flag is yellow-blue. The coat of arms is nearly unchanged in use since 1556. It is the coat of arms of the Counts of Wertheim. The meaning of the symbols is unknown.

== Twin towns – sister cities ==
Wertheim is twinned with:

- Salon-de-Provence, France (1964)
- Godmanchester, England, United Kingdom (1981)
- Huntingdon, England, United Kingdom (1981)
- Szentendre, Hungary (1989)
- Csobánka, Hungary (1992)
- Gubbio, Italy (2006)

== Notable people ==
- Philipp Buchner (1614–1669), composer
- Johann Philipp Förtsch (1652–1732), composer, statesman and doctor
- Dominic Marquard, Prince of Löwenstein-Wertheim-Rochefort (1690–1735), second Prince
- Henri-Joseph Rigel (1741–1799), composer, worked in France
- Johann Gottfried Bremser (1767–1827), parasitologist and hygienist; favoured compulsory cowpox vaccinations
- August Uihlein (1842-1911), business executive, horse breeder, ran the Schlitz Brewing Company
- Edward Uihlein (1845-1921), business executive, philanthropist, vice president of the Schlitz Brewing Company
- Wilhelm Blos (1849–1927), journalist, historian, novelist, dramatist and politician (SPD).
- Infanta Adelgundes, Duchess of Guimarães (1858–1946), daughter of Miguel I of Portugal
- Infanta Maria Antónia of Portugal (1862–1959), daughter of Miguel I of Portugal
- Karl Hotz (1877-1941), German military officer assassinated in France.
- Matthew Klein, DE Wiki (1911–1988), philosopher and ethicist, was born in Bettingen
- Shimon Schwarzschild (1925-2021), environmentalist, grew up in Wertheim until aged 10.
- Gerd Langguth (1946–2013), political scientist
- Theodor Weimer (born 1959), manager; CEO of Deutsche Börse AG from 2018 to 2024

=== Sport ===
- Normann Stadler (born 1973), triathlete, winner of Ironman Hawaii 2004, 2006
- Thomas Reis (born 1973), former professional football player, played 247 games
- Prince Owusu (born 1997), footballer, now plays in the MLS with CF Montreal
