= Eisingen, Bavaria =

Eisingen
- Municipality
- Coat of arms

- Location of Eisingen within Würzburg district
- Interactive map of Eisingen
- Location within Germany Location within Bavaria
- Coordinates: 49°45′32″N 09°49′43″E
- Country: Germany
- State: Bavaria
- Admin. region: Unterfranken
- District: Würzburg

Government
  - Mayor (2020–26): Ursula Engert

Area
  - Total: 5.32 km^{2} (2.05 sq mi)
- Elevation: 327 m (1,073 ft)

Population (2025-12-31)
  - Total: 3,379
  - Density: 635/km^{2} (1,650/sq mi)
- Time zone: UTC+01:00 (CET)
  - Summer (DST): UTC+02:00 (CEST)
- Postal codes: 97249
- Dialling codes: 09306
- Vehicle registration: WÜ
- Website: eisingen.de

Eisingen (German pronunciation: [ˈaɪzɪŋən]) is a municipality in the district of Würzburg in Bavaria, Germany.
