= Helmstadt (Verwaltungsgemeinschaft) =

- Verwaltungsgemeinschaft
- Location of Helmstadt within Würzburg district
- Interactive map of Helmstadt
- Location within Germany Location within Bavaria
- Coordinates: 49°46′N 9°43′E
- Country: Germany
- State: Bavaria
- Admin. region: Lower Franconia
- District: Würzburg
- Seat: Helmstadt
- Subdivisions: 4 municipalities

Area
  - Total: 65.18 km^{2} (25.17 sq mi)

Population (2025-12-31)
  - Total: 6,860
  - Density: 105/km^{2} (273/sq mi)
- Time zone: UTC+01:00 (CET)
  - Summer (DST): UTC+02:00 (CEST)
- Website: www.vgem-helmstadt.de

Helmstadt is a Verwaltungsgemeinschaft (municipal association) in the district of Würzburg in Bavaria, Germany. Its seat is in Helmstadt.

It consists of the following municipalities:

1. Helmstadt
2. Holzkirchen
3. Remlingen
4. Uettingen
