= Kist (Verwaltungsgemeinschaft) =

- Verwaltungsgemeinschaft
- Location of Kist within Würzburg district
- Interactive map of Kist
- Location within Germany Location within Bavaria
- Coordinates: 49°44′N 9°50′E
- Country: Germany
- State: Bavaria
- Admin. region: Lower Franconia
- District: Würzburg
- Seat: Kist
- Subdivisions: 2 municipalities

Area
  - Total: 27.92 km^{2} (10.78 sq mi)

Population (2025-12-31)
  - Total: 4,624
  - Density: 165.6/km^{2} (428.9/sq mi)
- Time zone: UTC+01:00 (CET)
  - Summer (DST): UTC+02:00 (CEST)

Kist is a Verwaltungsgemeinschaft (municipal association) in the district of Würzburg in Bavaria, Germany. Its seat is in Kist.

It consists of the following municipalities:

1. Altertheim
2. Kist
