= Waldbrunn, Bavaria =

Waldbrunn
- Municipality
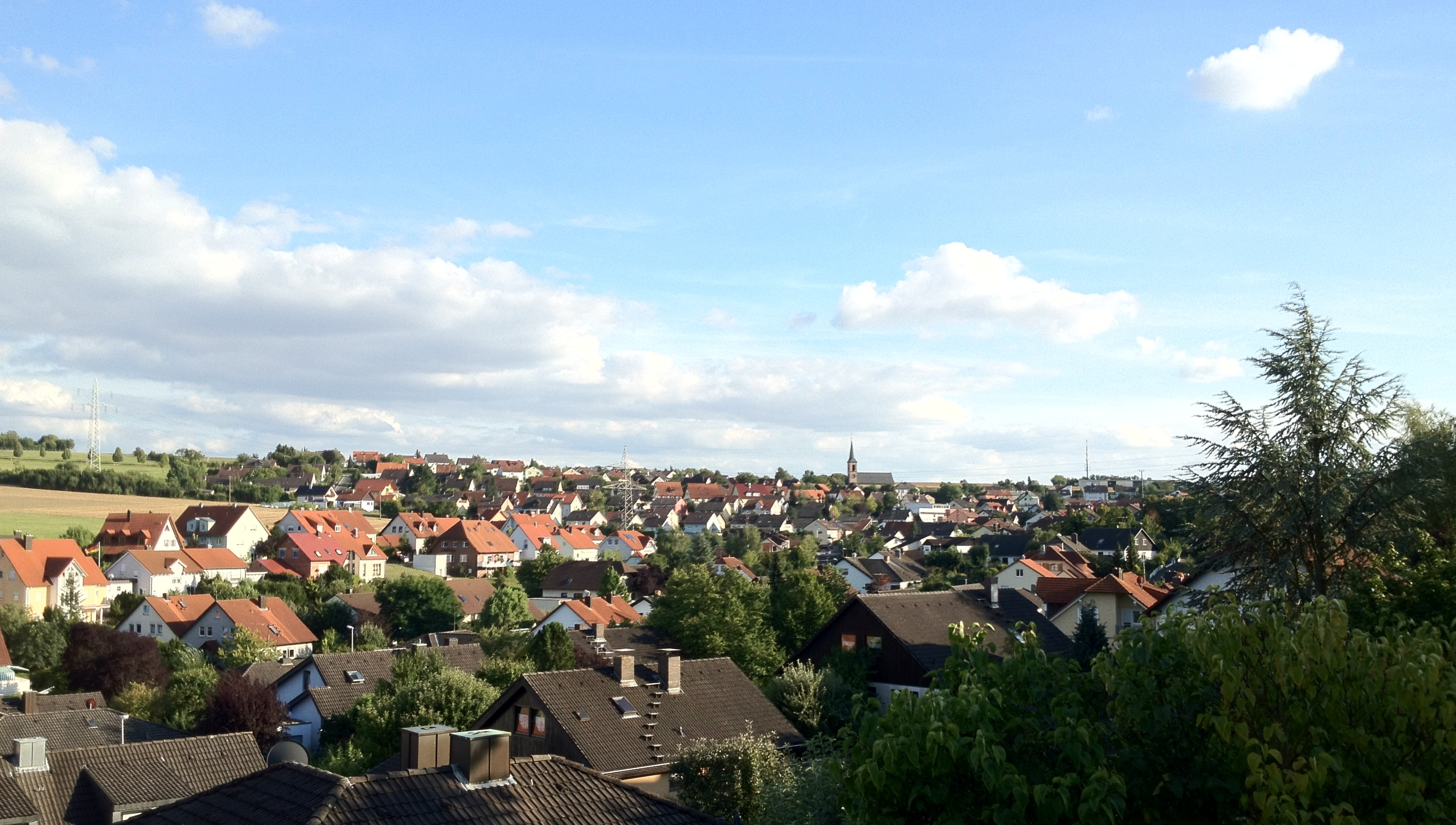
- Panorama of Waldbrunn

- Coat of arms

- Location of Waldbrunn within Würzburg district
- Interactive map of Waldbrunn
- Location within Germany Location within Bavaria
- Coordinates: 49°46′N 9°48′E
- Country: Germany
- State: Bavaria
- Admin. region: Unterfranken
- District: Würzburg

Government
  - Mayor (2020–26): Markus Haberstumpf (CSU)

Area
  - Total: 6.62 km^{2} (2.56 sq mi)
- Elevation: 297–347 m (974–1,138 ft)

Population (2025-12-31)
  - Total: 2,915
  - Density: 440/km^{2} (1,140/sq mi)
- Time zone: UTC+01:00 (CET)
  - Summer (DST): UTC+02:00 (CEST)
- Postal codes: 97295
- Dialling codes: 09306
- Vehicle registration: WÜ
- Website: www.gemeinde-waldbrunn.de

Waldbrunn (German pronunciation: [ˈvaltˌbʁʊn]) is a municipality in the district of Würzburg in Bavaria, Germany.
