= Höchberg =

- Municipality
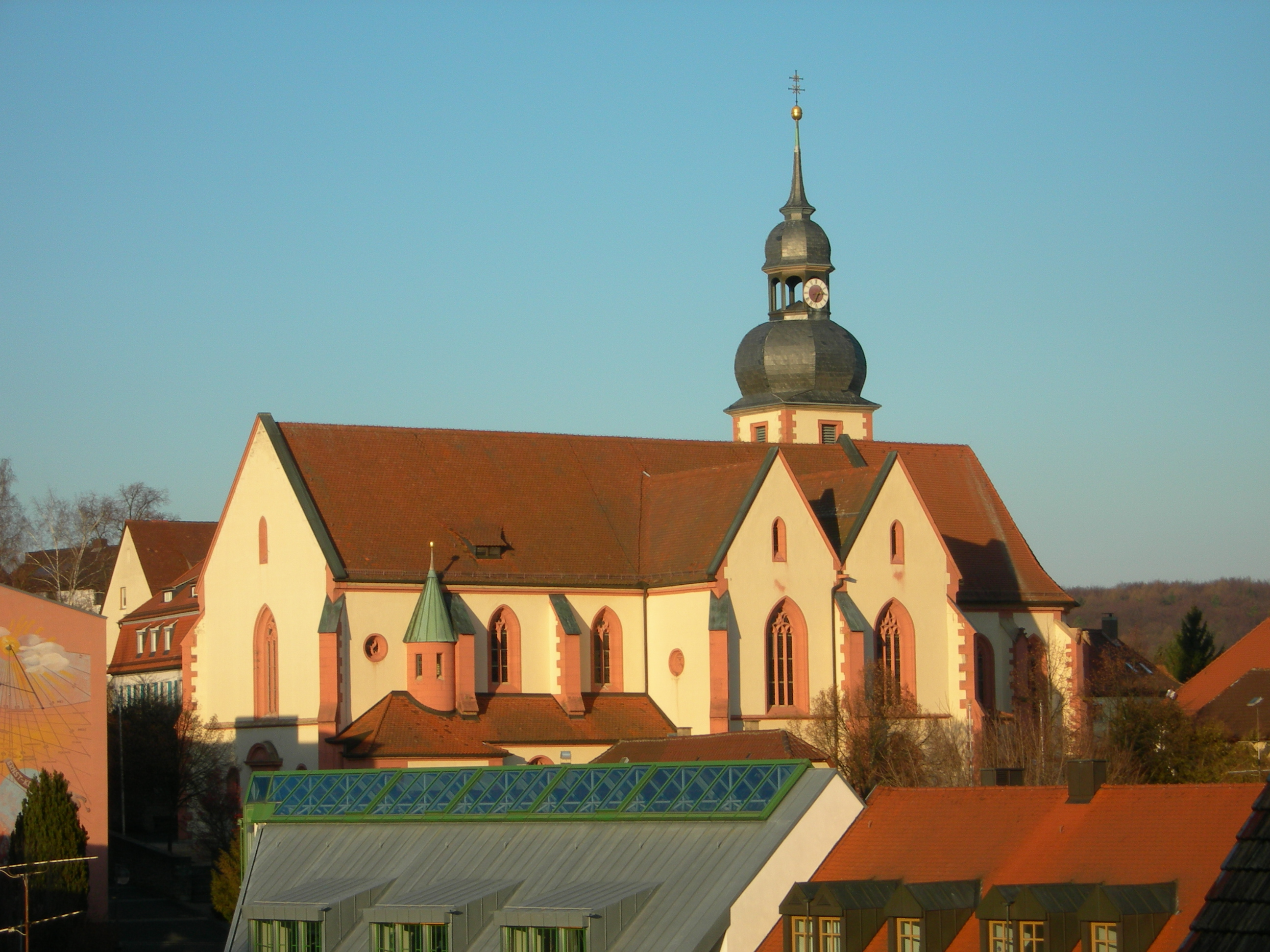
- Church of the Nativity of the Virgin Mary

- Coat of arms

- Location of Höchberg within Würzburg district
- Interactive map of Höchberg
- Location within Germany Location within Bavaria
- Coordinates: 49°46′59″N 09°52′54″E
- Country: Germany
- State: Bavaria
- Admin. region: Unterfranken
- District: Würzburg

Government
  - Mayor (2020–26): Alexander Knahn

Area
  - Total: 7.55 km^{2} (2.92 sq mi)
- Elevation: 280 m (920 ft)

Population (2025-12-31)
  - Total: 9,503
  - Density: 1,260/km^{2} (3,260/sq mi)
- Time zone: UTC+01:00 (CET)
  - Summer (DST): UTC+02:00 (CEST)
- Postal codes: 97204
- Dialling codes: 0931
- Vehicle registration: WÜ
- Website: www.hoechberg.de

Höchberg is a municipality in the district of Würzburg in Bavaria, Germany. Höchberg borders, in the east, directly on the city of Würzburg. Höchberg consists of two main urban areas: Altort and Hexenbruch. Residential construction areas have been added in recent years, for example "Mehle" and " Mehle II".

== History ==
The earliest recorded official reference to Höchberg dates from 748.

Jewish families resided in Höchberg at least since the late 1600s. They established a Jewish cemetery and erected a synagogue in 1721, which was plundered in the November pogrom in 1938 by SA members. Since 1951, the building has served as a Protestant church. Today, a plaque at the church entry and a monument at the Jewish cemetery commemorate these facts.

== Notable residents ==
- Kurt Pompe (1899–1964), Nazi SS concentration camp commandant
