= Reichenberg, Bavaria =

Reichenberg
- Municipality
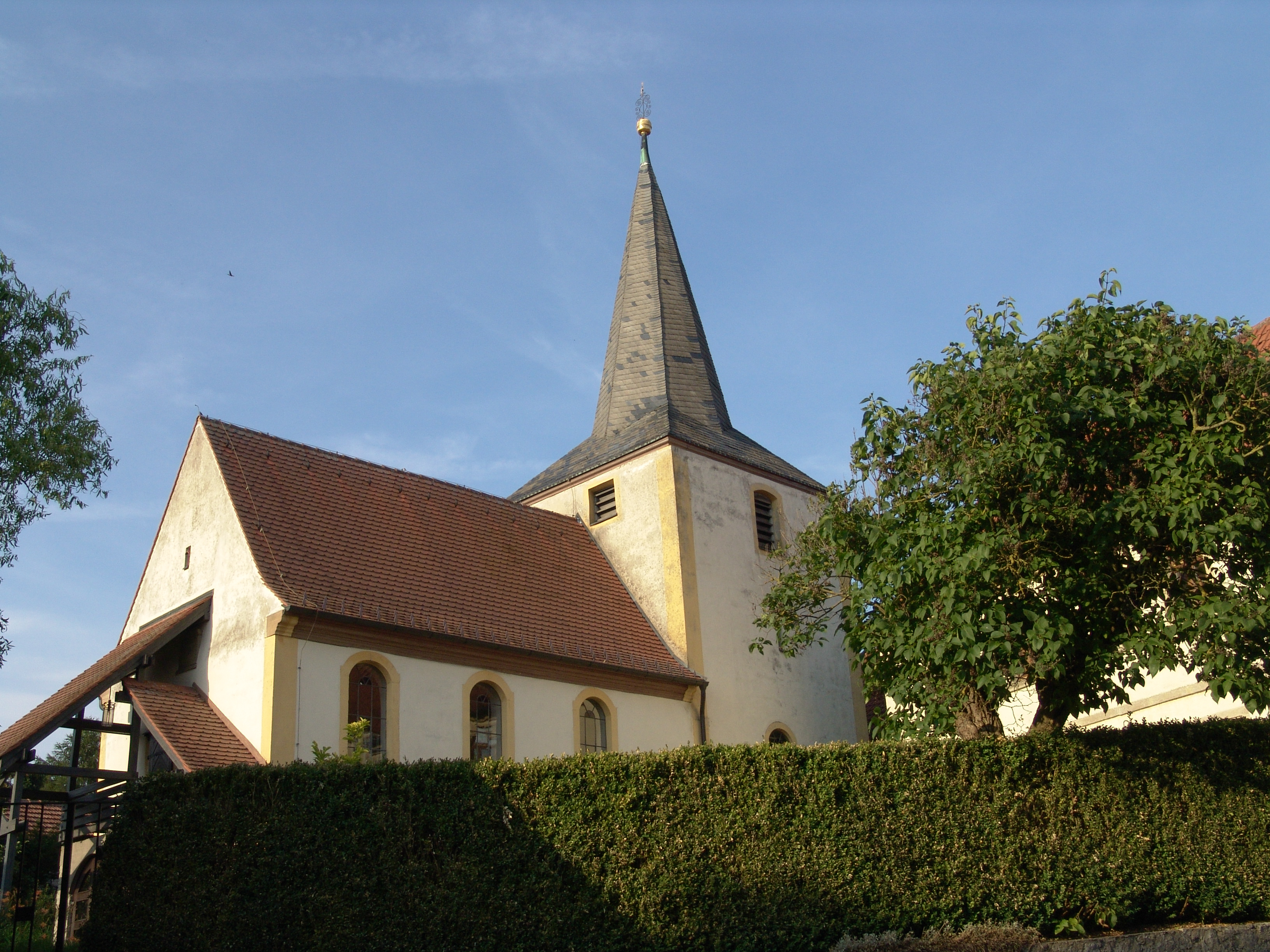
- Protestant church in Lindflur

- Coat of arms

- Location of Reichenberg within Würzburg district
- Interactive map of Reichenberg
- Location within Germany Location within Bavaria
- Coordinates: 49°43′54″N 9°55′6″E
- Country: Germany
- State: Bavaria
- Admin. region: Unterfranken
- District: Würzburg

Government
  - Mayor (2020–26): Stefan Hemmerich (SPD)

Area
  - Total: 34.79 km^{2} (13.43 sq mi)
- Elevation: 231 m (758 ft)

Population (2025-12-31)
  - Total: 4,216
  - Density: 121.2/km^{2} (313.9/sq mi)
- Time zone: UTC+01:00 (CET)
  - Summer (DST): UTC+02:00 (CEST)
- Postal codes: 97234
- Dialling codes: 0931
- Vehicle registration: WÜ
- Website: www.markt-reichenberg.de

Reichenberg (German pronunciation: [ˈʁaɪçn̩ˌbɛʁk]) is a market town and municipality in the district of Würzburg in Bavaria in Germany. It consists of the villages Albertshausen, Fuchsstadt, Lindflur, Reichenberg and Uengershausen.
