= Würzburg (district) =

Coordinates: 49°40′N 10°00′E

- District
- Flag Coat of arms
- Country: Germany
- State: Bavaria
- Adm. region: Lower Franconia
- Capital: Würzburg

Government
  - District admin.: Thomas Eberth (CSU)

Area
  - Total: 968.4 km^{2} (373.9 sq mi)

Population (31 December 2025)
  - Total: 161,586
  - Density: 166.9/km^{2} (432.2/sq mi)
- Time zone: UTC+01:00 (CET)
  - Summer (DST): UTC+02:00 (CEST)
- Vehicle registration: WÜ, OCH
- Website: landkreis-wuerzburg.de

Würzburg is a Landkreis (district) in the northwestern part of Bavaria, Germany. Neighboring districts are (from the north, clockwise) Main-Spessart, Schweinfurt, Kitzingen, Neustadt (Aisch)-Bad Windsheim, and the district Main-Tauber in Baden-Württemberg. The city Würzburg is not part of the district, although it is completely enclosed by it.

== History ==
In 1852, districts were created in the region, including the two precursor districts of Würzburg and Ochsenfurt. In 1972 the previous district Würzburg was merged with the former district Ochsenfurt, and several municipalities from the districts Marktheidenfeld, Karlstadt, Kitzingen and Gerolzhofen were added to form the district with today's borders.

== Economy ==
In 2017 (latest data available) the GDP per inhabitant was €28,681. This places the district 86th out of 96 districts (rural and urban) in Bavaria (overall average: €46,698).

== Partnerships ==
The district has sister city-like partnerships with these regions:

- - Mateh Yehuda Regional Council, Israel
- - Olomouc Region, Czech Republic

== Coat of arms ==
The district coat of arms might be described thus: Per fess in chief gules dancetty of three argent, in base per pale argent two lions passant guardant sable armed and langued of the first and azure a fleur-de-lis Or.

In chief (the upper part of the coat of arms) is the "Franconian Rake", the symbol of the former Bishopric of Wurzburg. In base, on the dexter (armsbearer’s right, viewer’s left) side, the fleur-de-lis is the symbol of the St. Burkhard Abbey in Würzburg, while the lions on the sinister (armsbearer’s left, viewer’s right) side derive from the coat of arms of the former Ochsenfurt district.

== Towns and municipalities ==
Clickable map of towns and municipalities in the district

Towns
Municipalities
1. Ochsenfurt

Market towns

1. Höchberg
2. Neubrunn
3. Randersacker
4. Reichenberg
5. Rimpar
6. Zell am Main
1. Eisingen
2. Gaukönigshofen
3. Gerbrunn
4. Güntersleben
5. Hausen bei Würzburg
6. Kleinrinderfeld
7. Kürnach
8. Leinach
9. Rottendorf
10. Theilheim
11. Thüngersheim
12. Unterpleichfeld
13. Veitshöchheim
14. Waldbrunn
15. Waldbüttelbrunn

Verwaltungsgemeinschaften
1. Aub; 1. Aub^{1,2}; 2. Gelchsheim^{3}; 3. Sonderhofen; 2. Bergtheim; 1. Bergtheim^{1}; 2. Oberpleichfeld	3. Eibelstadt; 1. Eibelstadt^{1,2}; 2. Frickenhausen am Main^{3}; 3. Sommerhausen^{3}; 4. Winterhausen^{3}; 4. Estenfeld; 1. Eisenheim^{3}; 2. Estenfeld^{1}; 3. Prosselsheim	5. Giebelstadt; 1. Bütthard^{3}; 2. Giebelstadt^{1,3}; 6. Helmstadt; 1. Helmstadt^{1,3}; 2. Holzkirchen; 3. Remlingen^{3}; 4. Uettingen	7. Hettstadt; 1. Greußenheim; 2. Hettstadt^{1}; 8. Kirchheim; 1. Geroldshausen; 2. Kirchheim^{1}; 9. Kist; 1. Altertheim; 2. Kist^{1}	10. Margetshöchheim; 1. Erlabrunn; 2. Margetshöchheim^{1}; 11. Röttingen; 1. Bieberehren; 2. Riedenheim; 3. Röttingen^{1,2}; 4. Tauberrettersheim
^{1}seat of the Verwaltungsgemeinschaft; ^{2}town; ^{3}Markt
