= Altertheim =

- Municipality
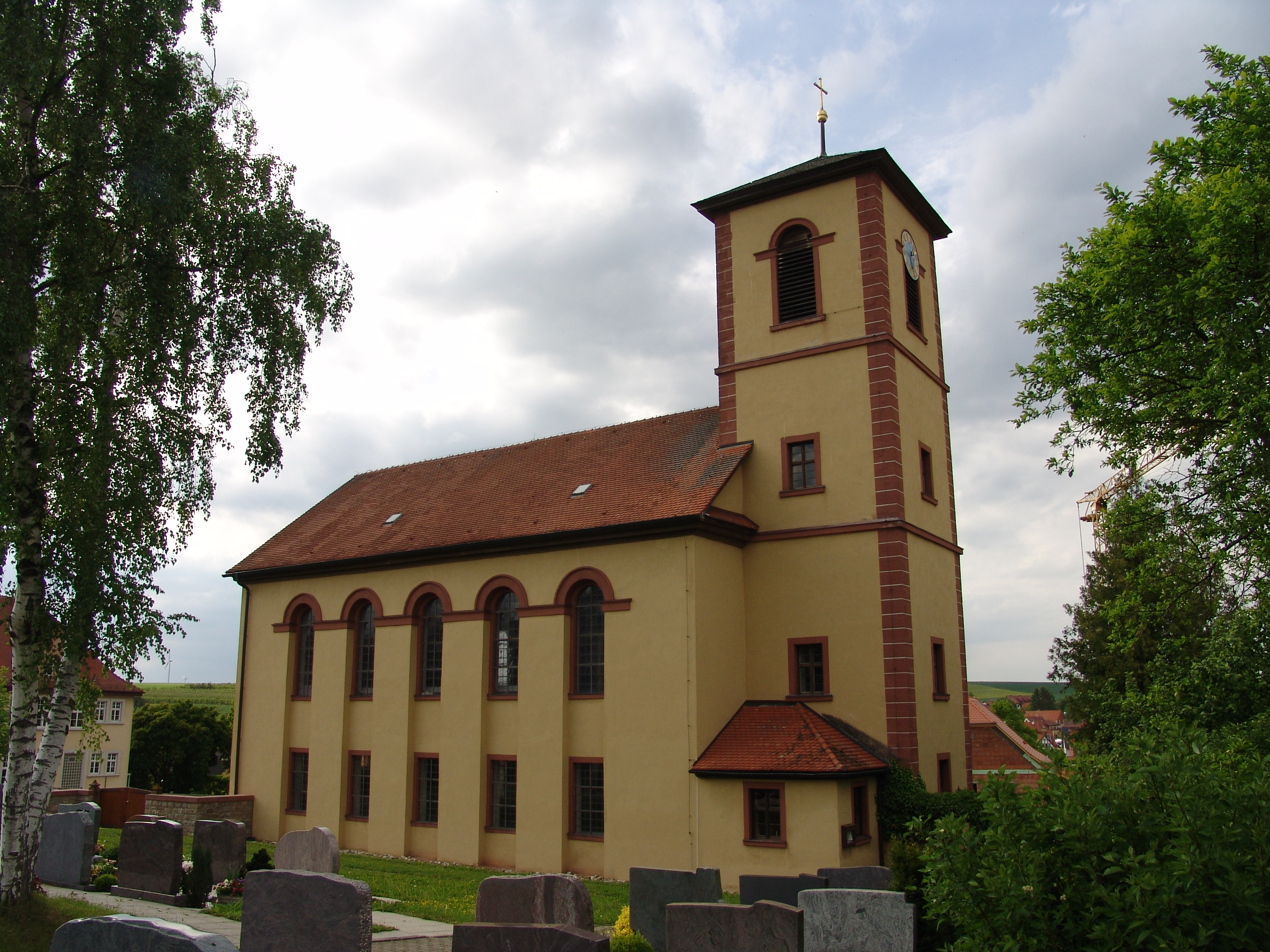
- Lutheran church in Oberaltertheim

- Coat of arms

- Location of Altertheim within Würzburg district
- Interactive map of Altertheim
- Location within Germany Location within Bavaria
- Coordinates: 49°43′N 9°45′E
- Country: Germany
- State: Bavaria
- Admin. region: Unterfranken
- District: Würzburg
- Municipal assoc.: Kist

Government
  - Mayor (2020–26): Bernd Korbmann (SPD)

Area
  - Total: 24.06 km^{2} (9.29 sq mi)
- Elevation: 250–270 m (820–890 ft)

Population (2025-12-31)
  - Total: 1,962
  - Density: 81.55/km^{2} (211.2/sq mi)
- Time zone: UTC+01:00 (CET)
  - Summer (DST): UTC+02:00 (CEST)
- Postal codes: 97237
- Dialling codes: 09307
- Vehicle registration: WÜ
- Website: www.altertheim.de/

Altertheim (German pronunciation: [ˈaltɐthaɪm]) is a municipality in the district of Würzburg in Bavaria, Germany.
