= Remlingen, Bavaria =

Remlingen
- Municipality
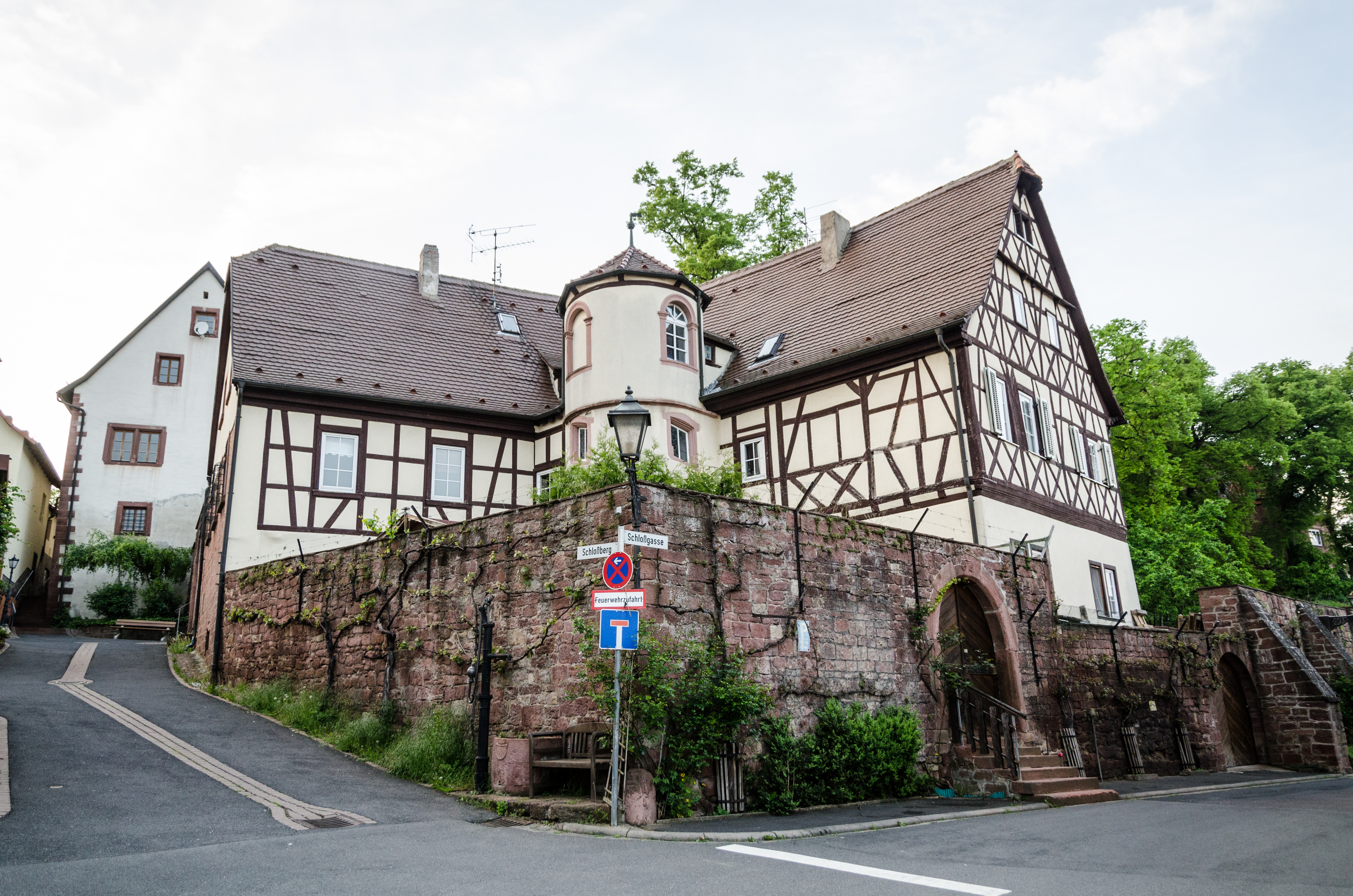
- Palace in Remlingen

- Coat of arms

- Location of Remlingen within Würzburg district
- Interactive map of Remlingen
- Location within Germany Location within Bavaria
- Coordinates: 49°48′16″N 09°41′39″E
- Country: Germany
- State: Bavaria
- Admin. region: Unterfranken
- District: Würzburg
- Municipal assoc.: Helmstadt

Government
  - Mayor (2020–26): Günter Schumacher

Area
  - Total: 20.45 km^{2} (7.90 sq mi)
- Elevation: 261 m (856 ft)

Population (2025-12-31)
  - Total: 1,460
  - Density: 71.4/km^{2} (185/sq mi)
- Time zone: UTC+01:00 (CET)
  - Summer (DST): UTC+02:00 (CEST)
- Postal codes: 97280
- Dialling codes: 09369
- Vehicle registration: WÜ
- Website: www.remlingen.de

Remlingen (German pronunciation: [ˈʁɛmlɪŋən]) is a municipality in the district of Würzburg in Bavaria in Germany.
