= Uettingen =

- Municipality
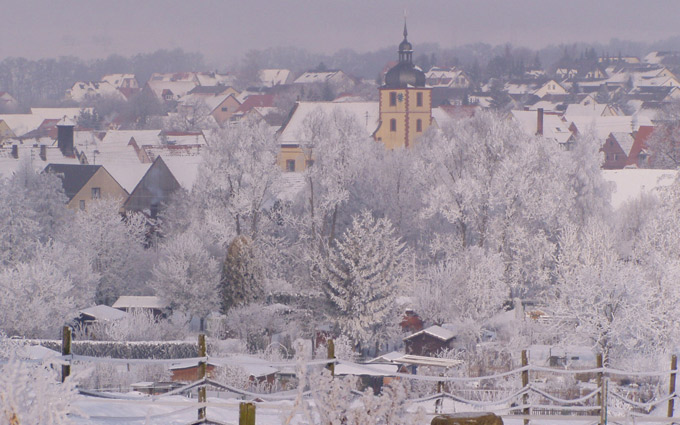
- Uettingen in winter

- Coat of arms

- Location of Uettingen within Würzburg district
- Interactive map of Uettingen
- Location within Germany Location within Bavaria
- Coordinates: 49°48′N 9°44′E
- Country: Germany
- State: Bavaria
- Admin. region: Unterfranken
- District: Würzburg
- Municipal assoc.: Helmstadt

Government
  - Mayor (2020–26): Edgar Schüttler

Area
  - Total: 13.52 km^{2} (5.22 sq mi)
- Elevation: 232 m (761 ft)

Population (2025-12-31)
  - Total: 1,938
  - Density: 143.3/km^{2} (371.3/sq mi)
- Time zone: UTC+01:00 (CET)
  - Summer (DST): UTC+02:00 (CEST)
- Postal codes: 97292
- Dialling codes: 09369
- Vehicle registration: WÜ
- Website: www.uettingen.de

Uettingen is a municipality in the district of Würzburg in Bavaria, Germany.
