= Holzkirchen, Lower Franconia =

Holzkirchen
- Municipality
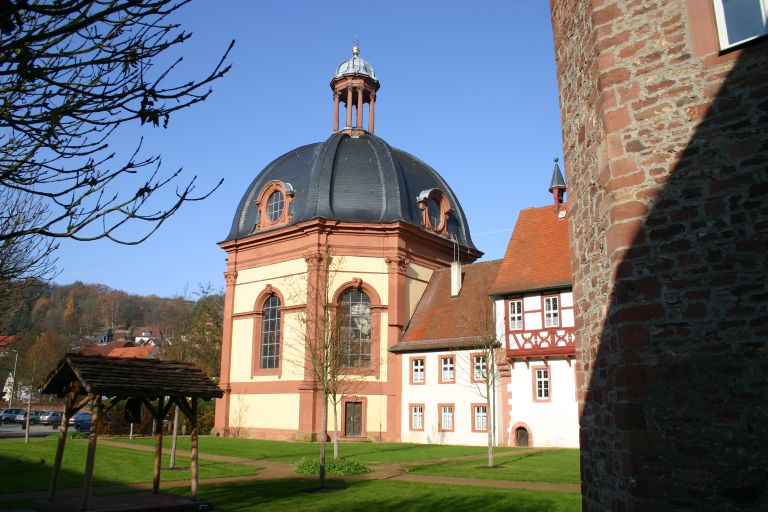
- Holzkirchen Abbey

- Coat of arms

- Location of Holzkirchen within Würzburg district
- Interactive map of Holzkirchen
- Location within Germany Location within Bavaria
- Coordinates: 49°47′N 9°41′E
- Country: Germany
- State: Bavaria
- Admin. region: Unterfranken
- District: Würzburg
- Municipal assoc.: Helmstadt

Government
  - Mayor (2020–26): Daniel Bachmann

Area
  - Total: 8.42 km^{2} (3.25 sq mi)
- Elevation: 198 m (650 ft)

Population (2025-12-31)
  - Total: 945
  - Density: 112/km^{2} (291/sq mi)
- Time zone: UTC+01:00 (CET)
  - Summer (DST): UTC+02:00 (CEST)
- Postal codes: 97292
- Dialling codes: 09369
- Vehicle registration: WÜ

Holzkirchen (German pronunciation: [ˈhɔltsˌkɪʁçn̩]) is a municipality in the district of Würzburg in Bavaria, Germany.
