= Waldbüttelbrunn =

- Municipality
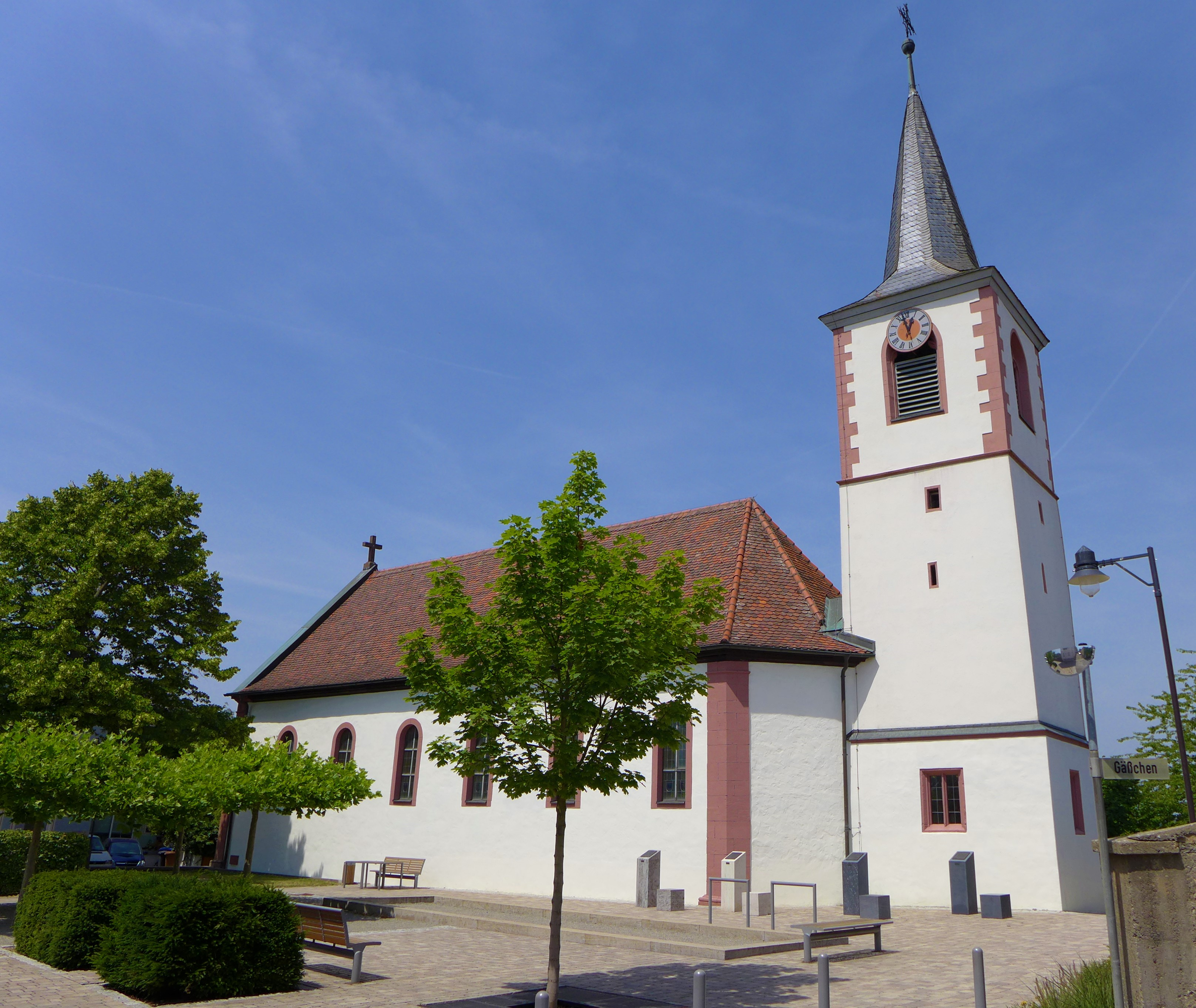
- Old Church in Waldbüttelbrunn

- Coat of arms

- Location of Waldbüttelbrunn within Würzburg district
- Interactive map of Waldbüttelbrunn
- Location within Germany Location within Bavaria
- Coordinates: 49°46′N 9°50′E
- Country: Germany
- State: Bavaria
- Admin. region: Unterfranken
- District: Würzburg
- Subdivisions: 3 urban districts

Government
  - Mayor (2020–26): Klaus Schmidt (SPD)

Area
  - Total: 19.10 km^{2} (7.37 sq mi)
- Elevation: 320 m (1,050 ft)

Population (2025-12-31)
  - Total: 4,904
  - Density: 256.8/km^{2} (665.0/sq mi)
- Time zone: UTC+01:00 (CET)
  - Summer (DST): UTC+02:00 (CEST)
- Postal codes: 97297
- Dialling codes: 0931
- Vehicle registration: WÜ
- Website: www.waldbuettelbrunn.de

Waldbüttelbrunn is a municipality in the district of Würzburg in Lower Franconia, Bavaria, Germany. It is located about 8 km (5.0 mi) west of Würzburg. The population is 5055 (December 2008).

== Business ==
There is a 28-hectare (69-acre) business park in the north of Waldbüttelbrunn, which provides employment to over 1000 people.

== History ==
Archaeological excavations have shown that the area was settled as early as 5000 BC. The first official document mentioning "Waldbüttelbrunn" as "Büttelbrunn" dates from AD 748.

In 1803 Waldbüttelbrunn, together with the whole area around Würzburg, became part of Bavaria. One of the last battles of the Austro-Prussian War of 1866 took place at Rossbrunn, now part of Waldbüttelbrunn, between Bavarian and Prussian troops.

== Twinning arrangements ==
Waldbütellbrunn is in good contact with the French municipality of Fleury sur Orne in Normandy, since 1994, with annual visits and student exchanges. The Polish municipality of Radomysl nad Sanem and the Thuringian municipality of Remptendorf are also twinned with Waldbüttelbrunn.
