= Neubrunn, Lower Franconia =

Neubrunn
- Municipality
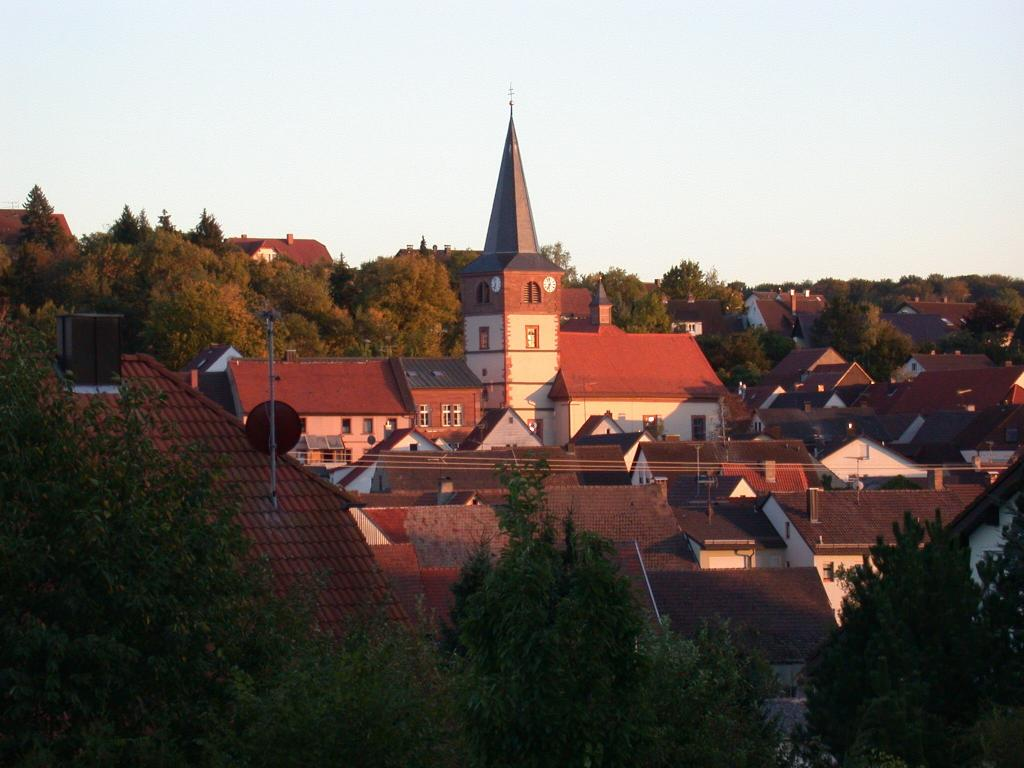
- Center of Neubrunn

- Coat of arms

- Location of Neubrunn within Würzburg district
- Interactive map of Neubrunn
- Location within Germany Location within Bavaria
- Coordinates: 49°44′N 9°40′E
- Country: Germany
- State: Bavaria
- Admin. region: Lower Franconia
- District: Würzburg

Government
  - Mayor (2020–26): Heiko Menig (CSU)

Area
  - Total: 26.54 km^{2} (10.25 sq mi)
- Elevation: 293 m (961 ft)

Population (2025-12-31)
  - Total: 2,266
  - Density: 85.38/km^{2} (221.1/sq mi)
- Time zone: UTC+01:00 (CET)
  - Summer (DST): UTC+02:00 (CEST)
- Postal codes: 97277
- Dialling codes: 09307
- Vehicle registration: WÜ
- Website: www.neubrunn.de

Neubrunn (German pronunciation: [ˈnɔʏbʁʊn]) is a municipality in the district of Würzburg in Lower Franconia, Bavaria, Germany.

It consists of the districts Böttigheim and Neubrunn.
