= Women in warfare and the military in the 19th century =

Aspect of women's history

The following is a list of women in war and their exploits from about 1800 up to about 1899.

For women in warfare in the United States at this time, please see Timeline of women in war in the United States, pre-1945.

Only women active in direct warfare, such as warriors, spies, and women who actively led armies are included in this list.

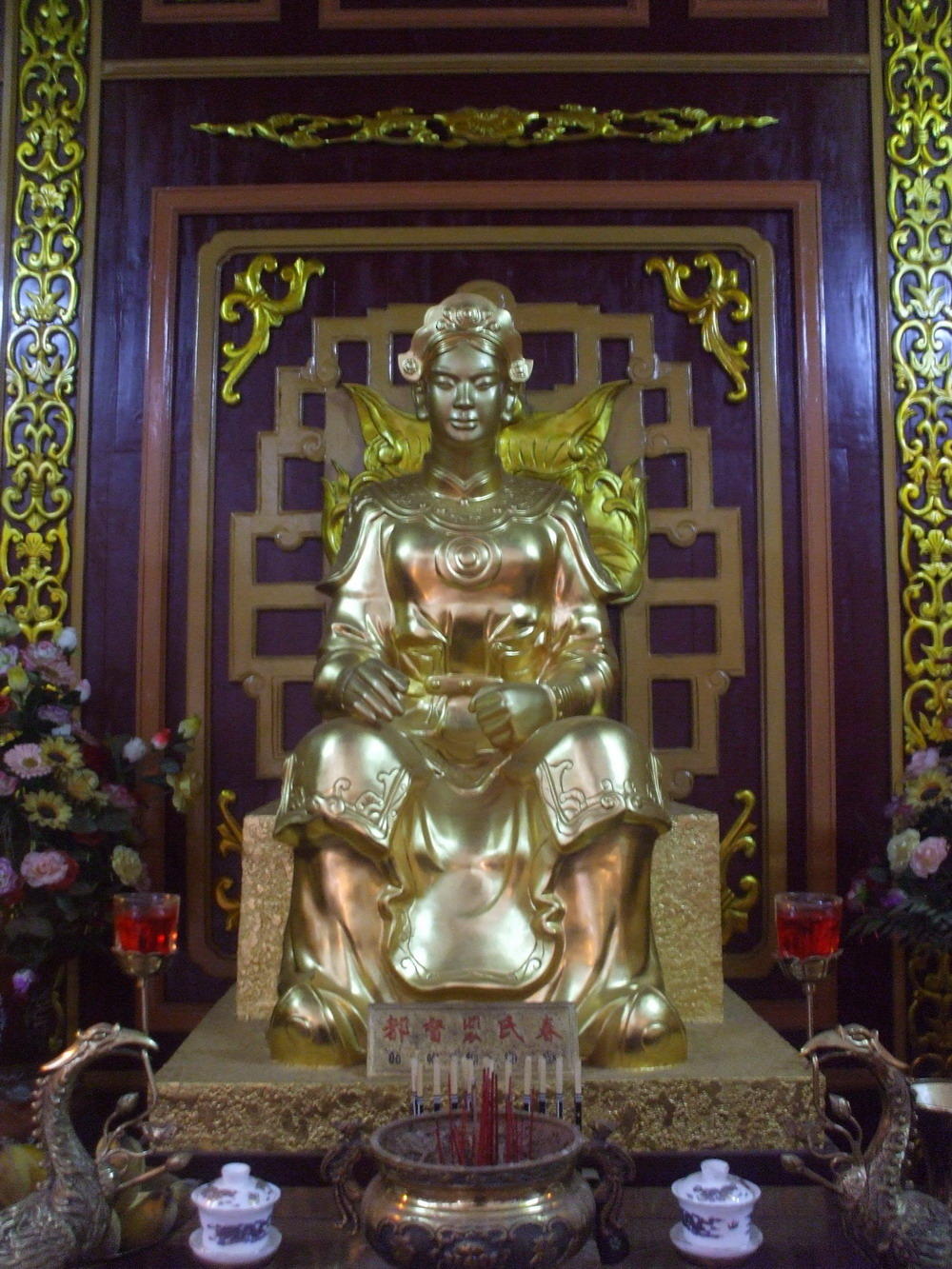
Bùi Thị Xuân

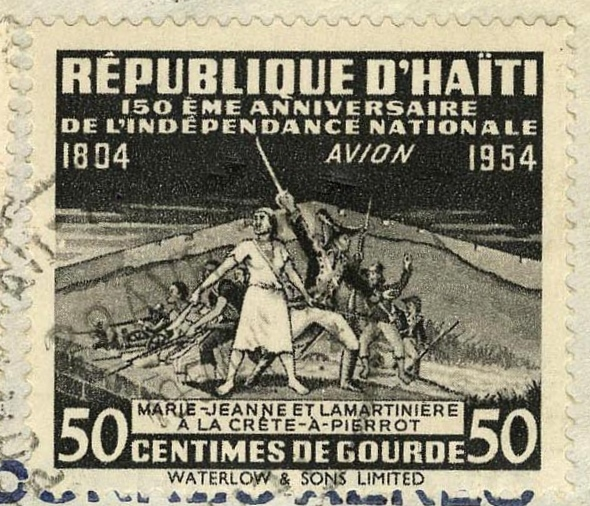
Marie-Jeanne Lamartinière

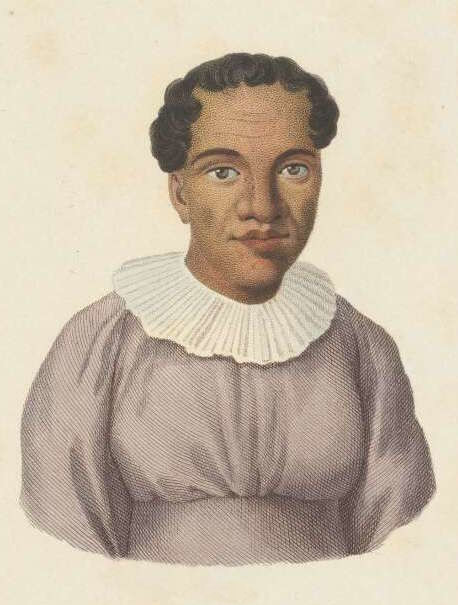
Teriitaria II

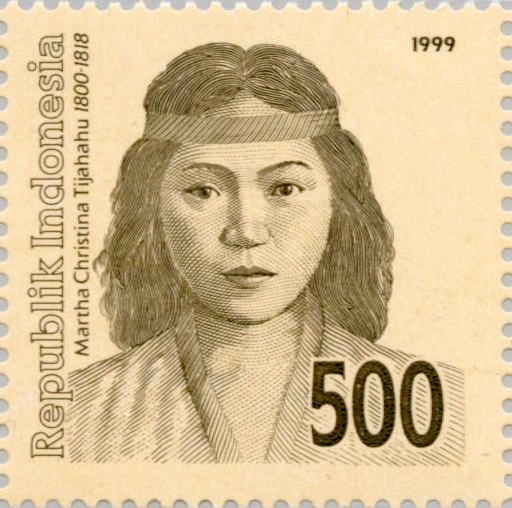
Martha Christina Tiahahu

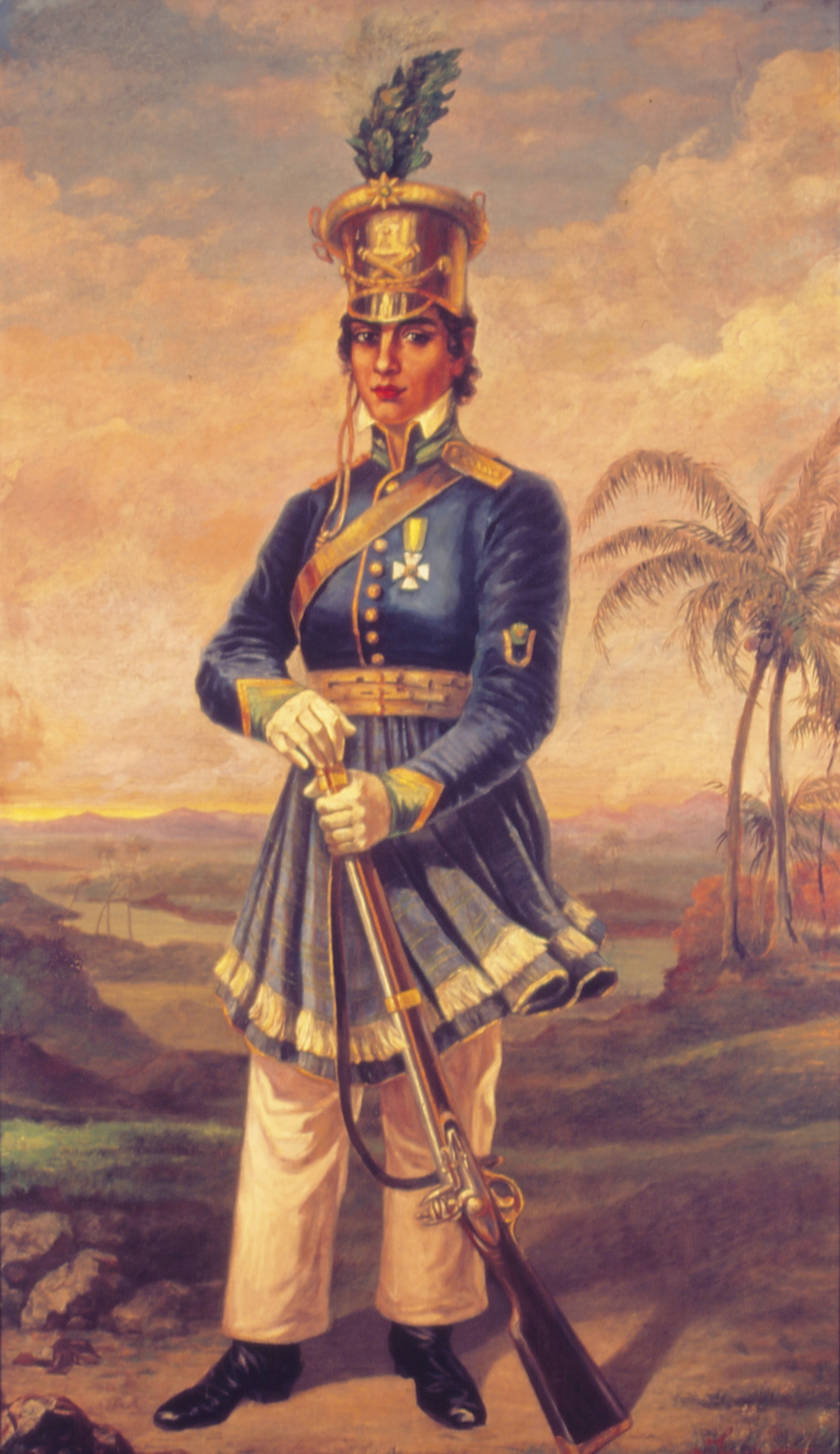
Maria Quitéria

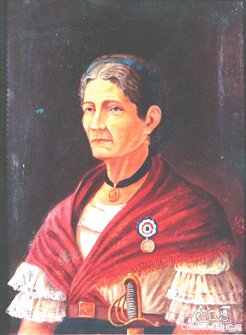
Pancha Carrasco

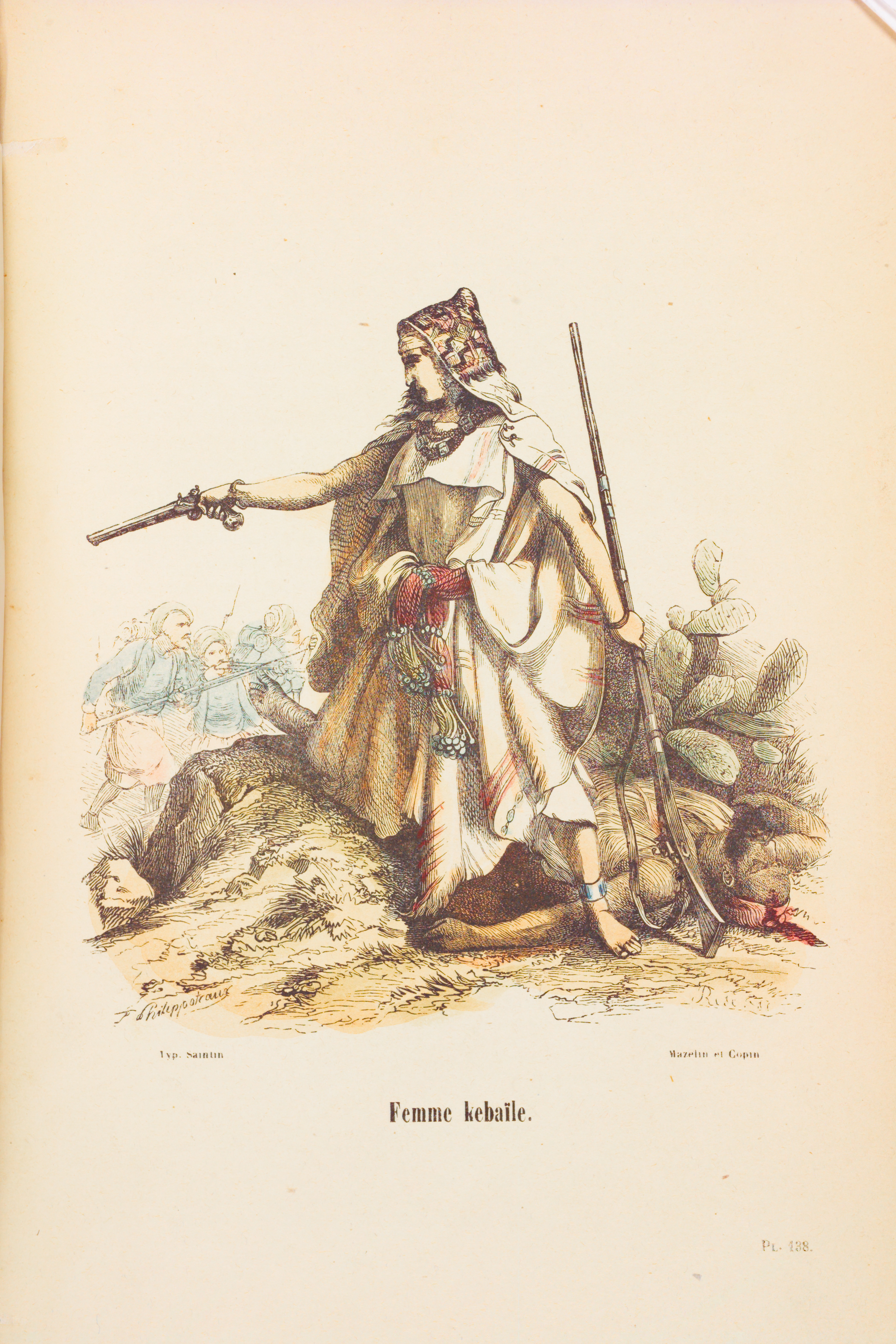
Lalla Fatma N'Soumer

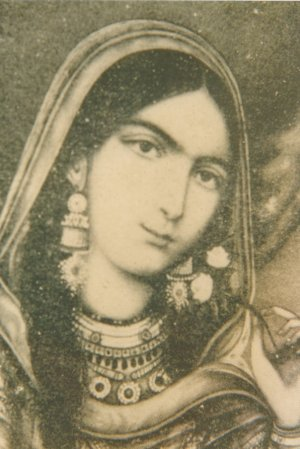
Begum Hazrat Mahal

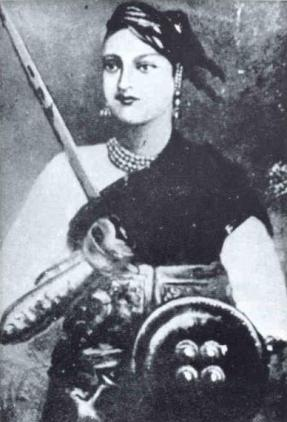
Rani of Jhansi

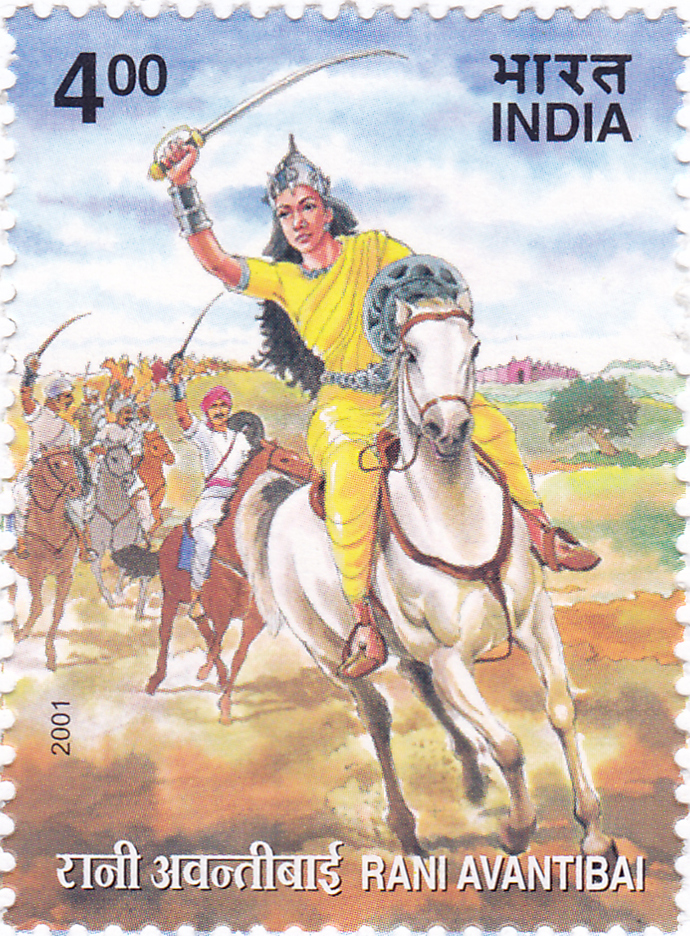
Avantibai

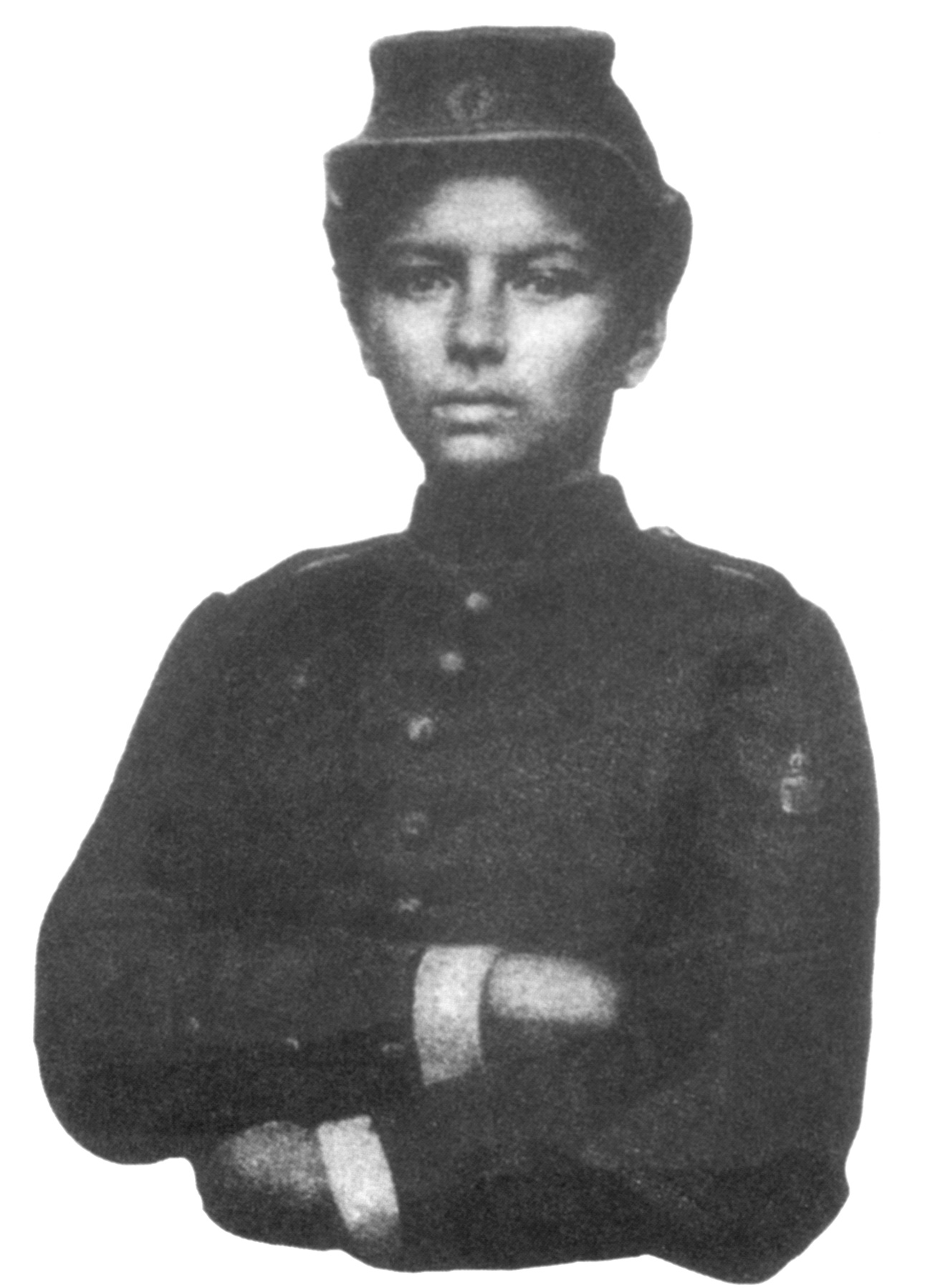
Jovita Feitosa

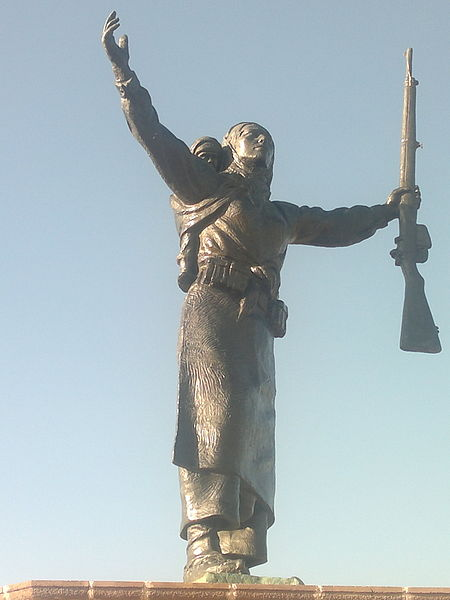
Nene Hatun

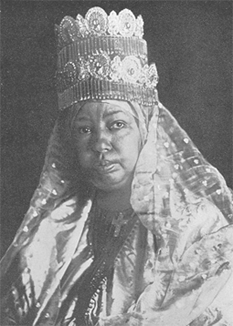
Taytu Betul

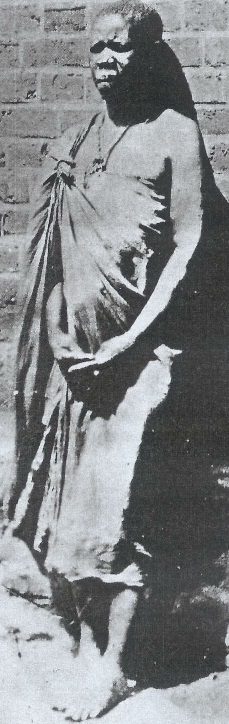
Nehanda Nyakasikana

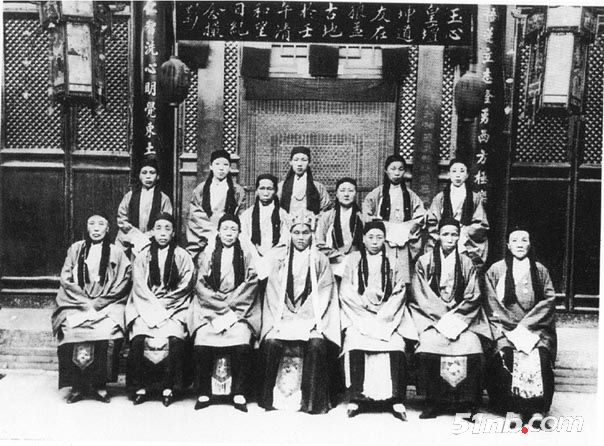
Lin Hei'er and the Red Lantern Unit

== 1800s ==
- Early 19th century: Geertrudia van den Heuvel served as corporal in the Netherlands dressed as a man under the name Jacobus Philippus Vermeij.
- 1802: Bùi Thị Xuân, the general of rebel forces during the Tây Sơn Rebellion in Vietnam, is captured and executed by her enemies.
- 1802: Marie-Jeanne Lamartinière served at the Battle of Crête-à-Pierrot.
- 1802: Mai Sukhan defends the town of Amritsar against Ranjit Singh.
- 1802: La Mulâtresse Solitude participates in the former slaves fight for freedom in the Battle of 18 May, when slavery was reintroduced on Guadeloupe by Napoleon.
- 1803: Lorenza Avemanay led a revolt against Spanish occupation in Ecuador.
- 1803: Madame d'Oettlinger served as a spy for Napoleon in Germany.
- 1805: Jane Townsend served aboard HMS Defiance during the Battle of Trafalgar.
- 1805–1812: Marie-Thérèse Figueur served under Napoleon and Jean-Louis Dubreton during the War of the Third Coalition, the War of the Fourth Coalition, and the Peninsular War.
- 1806-1812: Virginie Ghesquière took her brother's place in the 27th Line regiment of Napoleon's army, served during the Peninsular War under Andoche Junot, was promoted to lieutenant, and in 1857 was awarded the Saint Helena medal.
- 1805: Marie-Jeanne Schellinck served in the Battle of Austerlitz.
- 1806: Manuela Pedraza fought in the reconquest of Buenos Aires after the first British invasion of the Río de la Plata.
- 1807–1816: Nadezhda Durova served in the Russian army. She earned the cross of St George for valour in combat and became the Russian army's first female officer.
- 1808: Juana Galán was a guerrilla fighter of the Peninsular War (1808–1814).
- 1808: Manuela Malasaña participated in The 2nd of May Uprising in Madrid (1808) against the troops of Napoleon I of France during the Peninsular War.
- 1808: Agustina de Aragón defended Spain during the Spanish War of Independence. During the bloody sieges of Saragossa, French General Jean-Antonie Verdier started the attack with a twenty-seven-hour bombardment of Zaragoza. At the Portillo Gate, most of the Spanish defenders had been killed or wounded, and on 2 July 1808 a French column launched an assault on the unmanned Portillo Gate battery. Observing the danger, twenty-two-year-old Agustina rushed forward to a twenty-four-pound cannon, retrieved the still-burning wick from the hands of a fallen gunner, and fired the cannon loaded with grapeshot at the advancing French column that decimated it and gave Spanish reinforcements time to arrive from a nearby battery to repel the attack. Agustina herself explained the facts in a memorial signed in Sevilla city in date 12 August 1810.
- 1808–1809: Elisa Servenius enlisted in the Swedish army dressed as a man because "She had decided to live and to die with her husband", the soldier Bernhard Servenus; she participated in the war between Sweden and Russia over Finland and, during one battle, she collected ammunition from the Russians and gave them to her comrades. She was later discovered and discharged but decorated with a medal for bravery in battle.
- 1809–1813: Joanna Żubr served in the Polish army. She received the Virtuti Militari, the first woman to be granted the highest Polish military award.
- 1809–1825: Juana Azurduy de Padilla acted as a guerrilla leader in Bolivia.

== 1810s ==
- 1810s: Juana Ramírez commands a group of female rebel soldiers during the Venezuelan War of Independence.
- 1810s: Teriitaria II personally leads armies into battle.
- 1810, Sweden: Maria Nilsdotter i Ölmeskog dissolves a potential rebel army and is rewarded by the monarch for having prevented a rebellion.
- 1811–1812: María Feliciana joined the pro-independence rebellion in El Salvador along with her sisters and helped in the capture of Sensuntepeque.
- 1811–1817: Gertrudis Bocanegra serves as a spy, a messenger and a guerrilla fighter during the Mexican War of Independence.
- 1811–1817: María Martínez provides reports as a spy to the rebel army during the Mexican War of Independence. She is fined and jailed several times, and is eventually executed.
- 1812: Vasilisa Kozhina leads a Russian partisan group against Napoleon.
- 1812: Marie Manuel and her husband Blaise Peuxe serve together as gunners in a French artillery unit during the Peninsular War. They are captured together when the British Army enters Madrid in August 1812, and become prisoners of war in Scotland, where Marie is officially acknowledged as an enemy combatant rather than simply a camp follower, wearing uniform and avoiding the repatriation imposed on other prisoners' attendant families. The memoirs of another prisoner hint that she was a Spanish girl who had met her husband when she saved him from guerrillas in 1811, but this source may combine the story of the husband-and-wife gunners with elements of the biographies of other female prisoners-of-war in the same group.
- 1812–1814: Francina Broese Gunningh serve in the French, the Prussian and finally in the Dutch army dressed as a male under the name Frans Gunningh Sloet.
- 1813: Eleonore Prochaska was killed fighting for the Lützow Free Corps.
- 1813: Manuela Medina participates in active warfare in the Battle of Acapulco during the Mexican War of Independence.
- 1813–1815: Anna Lühring and Friederike Krüger serve in the Prussian army during the Napoleonic Wars.
- 1813: Laura Secord Canadian heroine of the War of 1812
- 1813: Johanna Stegen participates in the defense of the city of Lüneburg against the French.
- 1814: Ghaliyya al-Wahhabiyya defend Mecca against the Ottomans with her own Wahhabi army at the Battle of Turaba.
- 1814: Úrsula Goyzueta participates in the defense of Santa Barbara during the Bolivian War of Independence.
- 1815: William Brown (birth name unknown), a Royal Navy sailor, is discovered to be a woman. She is the first black woman to serve in the Royal Navy.
- 1815: Several women are found dead in British uniforms after the Battle of Waterloo, among them Mary Dixon, who dies in service after having served sixteen years in the British army dressed as a man.
- 1817: La Pola is executed by the Spanish after having served as a spy during the Colombian War of Independence.
- 1817: Martha Christina Tiahahu fights against the Dutch colonial government in Molucca, Indonesia.
- 1819: Manono II, fought along with her husband Keaoua Kekuaokalani, in the Battle of Kuamoo, where both perished in defense of the kapu system.
- 1819: María Antonia Santos Plata, a Neogranadine (now Colombia) peasant, galvanized, organized, and led the rebel guerrillas in the province of Socorro against the invading Spanish troops during the Reconquista of the New Granada; she was ultimately captured, tried, and found guilty of lese-majesty and high treason, sentenced and ultimately put to death by firing squad.

== 1820s ==
- 1821–1824: Laskarina Bouboulina fights in the Greek War of Independence.
- 1821–1823: Manto Mavrogenous fights in the Greek War of Independence.
- 1821: Rallou Karatza participates in the Greek war of Independence.
- 1821–1824: Adamantia Grigoriadou participates in the Greek war of Independence.
- 1822: Angélique Brûlon, a female soldier who had fought in defence of Corsica from 1792 to 1799, is promoted to lieutenant. She had originally fought while disguised as a man, but eventually fought openly as a woman. She retires the same year.
- 1822: Maria Quitéria fights in the Brazilian war of independence.
- 1824: Queen Kittur Chennamma of the Kittur kingdom in India participates in several campaigns against the East India Company.
- 1828–1830: Tarenorerer leads a guerrilla band of Aboriginal Australians of both sexes during the Black War in Tasmania.

== 1830s ==
- 1831–32: Countess Emilia Plater compose and command a company of Infantry as captain during the Polish November uprising.
- 1835: Ngoni warrior-queen Nyamazana kills the last Rozvi king, later marrying Ndebele leader Mzilikazi.
- 1838–1839: Johanna Martens serves in the Dutch army dressed as a man to be near to her lover, a soldier.
- 1838-1840: African slave trader magnate Mary Faber de Sanger conducted warfare with her private army against her rival William Ormond in Bangalan, in what is now Guinea.
- 20 January 1839: Sergeant Candelaria Perez fights in the Battle of Yungay.

== 1840s ==
- 1841: Ana María Martínez de Nisser participated in the Battle of Salamina 5 May 1841 during the War of the Supremes.
- 1842: African slave trader magnate Mary Faber de Sanger conducts warfare with her private army against the British and their allies the Susu tribe with her ally Elizabeth Bailey Gomez, and plunder the Susu capital.
- 1843: The slave Carlota was one of the three leaders of the slave rebellion of Year of the Lash on Cuba.
- 1844–1846: María Trinidad Sánchez participates as a courier in the Dominican War of Independence.
- 1848: Luisa Battistati defends Milan during the Revolution of 1848.
- 1848: Luise Aston serves in the Freikorps during the war in Schleswig.
- 1848: Mária Lebstück (1831–1892) was a Hussar officer during the Hungarian War of Independence of 1848 and 1849 under the name Károly Lebstück.
- 1848: Pelaghia Roşu commands a battalion of women in defense of her village during the failed revolutionary attempt.
- 1848: Júlia Bányai serves as a spy as well as an officer in the Hungarian army during the Hungarian Revolution of 1848.

== 1850s ==
- 1850s: Su Sanniang joins the Taiping Rebellion with her army of outlaws and commands them in combat against the Imperial forces.
- 1850s: Qiu Ersao commands 500 female rebel soldiers against the Imperial forces during the Taiping Rebellion.
- 1850s: Hong Xuanjiao commands the female units of the rebel army against the Imperial forces during the Taiping Rebellion.
- 1851: Júlia Bányai participates in the uprising against Austria in Transylvania.
- 1851: Seh-Dong-Hong-Beh of the Dahomey Amazons is documented.
- 1852-1855: The African slave traders Mary Faber de Sanger and Elizabeth Bailey Gomez conduct warfare against the British and their allies the Susus tribe with their private armies.
- 1854: Florence Nightingale (a British nurse) revolutionised both the care of sick soldiers and expectations of the role of women of her status, in the Crimean War.
- 1856: Pancha Carrasco takes part in the Second Battle of Rivas in Costa Rica. While serving the militia as a cook and impromptu medic, she filled her apron pockets with bullets, grabbed a discarded rifle and shamed some of the retreating Costa Ricans, forestalling what might have become a rout.
- 1857: Last stand of Lalla Fatma N'Soumer, an Algerian woman who resisted French colonialism.
- 1857–1858: Indian queen Rani of Jhansi leads several battles against the East India Company. A member of her army, Jalkari Bai, defended Jhansi fort for the duration of the Rebellion.
- 1857–1858: Begum Hazrat Mahal leads a band of her supporters against the East India Company in the Indian rebellion of 1857.
- 1858, 28 March: After personally leading a campaign against the East India Company to regain her throne, Avantibai of the Indian state of Ramgarth kills herself when defeat seems imminent.

== 1860s ==
- 1860–1865: Some 500 to 1,000 women fought as soldiers in the American Civil War disguised as men.
- 1863: Anna Henryka Pustowojtowna fights in the Polish uprising dressed as a man.
- 25 July 1865: Retired military Inspector General, H.M. Army Hospitals, Doctor James Barry, dies. Upon inspection of the corpse, it is discovered that Barry was in fact, female assigned at birth.
- 1865: Jovita Feitosa joins the Brazilian army during the Paraguayan War.
- 1867-1870: Du Fengyang commands her own rebel army during the Panthay rebellion in China.
- October 1868: In Japan, Nakano Takeko and a group of other women take part in the Battle of Aizu.

== 1870s ==
- 1870: Jane Dieulafoy serves as a soldier in the French army alongside her spouse dressed as a man during the Franco-Prussian war.
- 1870: Marie-Antoinette Lix participated in the defense of Vosges and the city of Langres, and distinguished herself during the Battle of Nompatelize.
- 1870-1871: Women communards in Paris organise in the Federated Legion of Women to defend the Paris Commune as soldiers.
- 1873-1876: The Duch deaconess Jeanne Merkus dresses like a man and leads her own group of rebel warriors within the rebel gerilla of Mićo Ljubibratić, who fights the Turks in Herzegovina, and is dubbed the "Joan of Arc of the Balkans" in the international press.
- 1877: Nene Hatun fought against Russian forces during the recapture of Fort Aziziye in Erzurum from Russian forces at the start of the Russo-Turkish War of 1877–1878.
- 1879: Irene Morales serves in the Chilean army during the War of the Pacific dressed as a man.
- 1879: Filomena Valenzuela Goyenechea serves in the Chilean army during the Battle of Pisagua, Battle of Dolores and Battle of Los Ángeles during the War of the Pacific.

== 1880s ==
- 1880: Malalai of Maiwand rallies local Pashtun fighters at the Battle of Maiwand during the Second Anglo-Afghan War. She fought alongside Ayub Khan and was responsible for the Afghan victory.
- 1881: Antonia Moreno Leyva accompanies her spouse on the Breña campaign during the War of the Pacific, and actively commands battalions during his absence.
- 1883: Marieta de Veintemilla, the niece and first lady of president Ignacio de Veintemilla, takes control of the capital, the government and its military forces in the name of her absent uncle and commands the defense of the capital of Quito when it is attacked by the rebels.
- 1885: Yona Markova serves in the Bulgarian army dressed as a man during the Serbo-Bulgarian War.
- 1885: Women started serving with the Canadian military in 1885, as nurses.

== 1890s ==
- 1 March 1896: Taytu Betul marches to the Battle of Adwa with the Ethiopian imperial army, and commands a force of cannonners.
- 1896: Philippine Revolution breaks out. Filipina woman Melchora Aquino becomes known as the "Grand Woman of the Revolution" and the "Mother of Balintawak" for her direct assistance to the revolutionaries. Teresa Magbanua also takes part, fighting against the Spanish, and later fighting against American colonial forces during the Philippine–American War.
- 1896: Shona spiritual leader Nehanda Nyakasikana rebels against colonization of Zimbabwe.
- 1899–1900: Lin Hei'er commands the Red Lantern Unit of women rebel soldiers during the Boxer Rebellion.

== See also ==
- Women in the Mexican–American War
