= Tauá Airport =

Pedro Teixeira Castelo Airport Aeroporto Pedro Teixeira Castelo
- IATA: JTA; ICAO: SDZG; LID: CE0008

Summary
- Airport type: Public
- Operator: Infraero (2023–2025); Visac Aeroportos (2025-present)
- Serves: Tauá
- Time zone: BRT (UTC−03:00)
- Elevation AMSL: 444 m (1,457 ft)
- Coordinates: 05°56′00″S 040°17′51″W
- Website: www4.infraero.gov.br/aeroporto-taua/

Map
- Location in Brazil

Runways
Direction	Length		Surface
Direction	m	ft	Surface
09/27	1,200	3,937	Asphalt

Statistics (2024)
- Passengers: 678
- Aircraft Operations: 286
- Metric tonnes of cargo: 0
- Statistics: Infraero; Sources: Airport Website, ANAC, DECEA

Pedro Teixeira Castelo Airport (IATA: JTA, ICAO: SDZG), is the airport serving Tauá, Brazil.

It is managed by contract by Visac Aeroportos.

== History ==
Previously operated by Infraero, on April 22, 2025 the State of Ceará signed a one-year contract of operation with Visac Aeroportos.

== Access ==
The airport is located 9 km (6 mi) from downtown Tauá.

== See also ==
- List of airports in Brazil
