= Alfred von Degenfeld =

Alfred Ludwig von Degenfeld
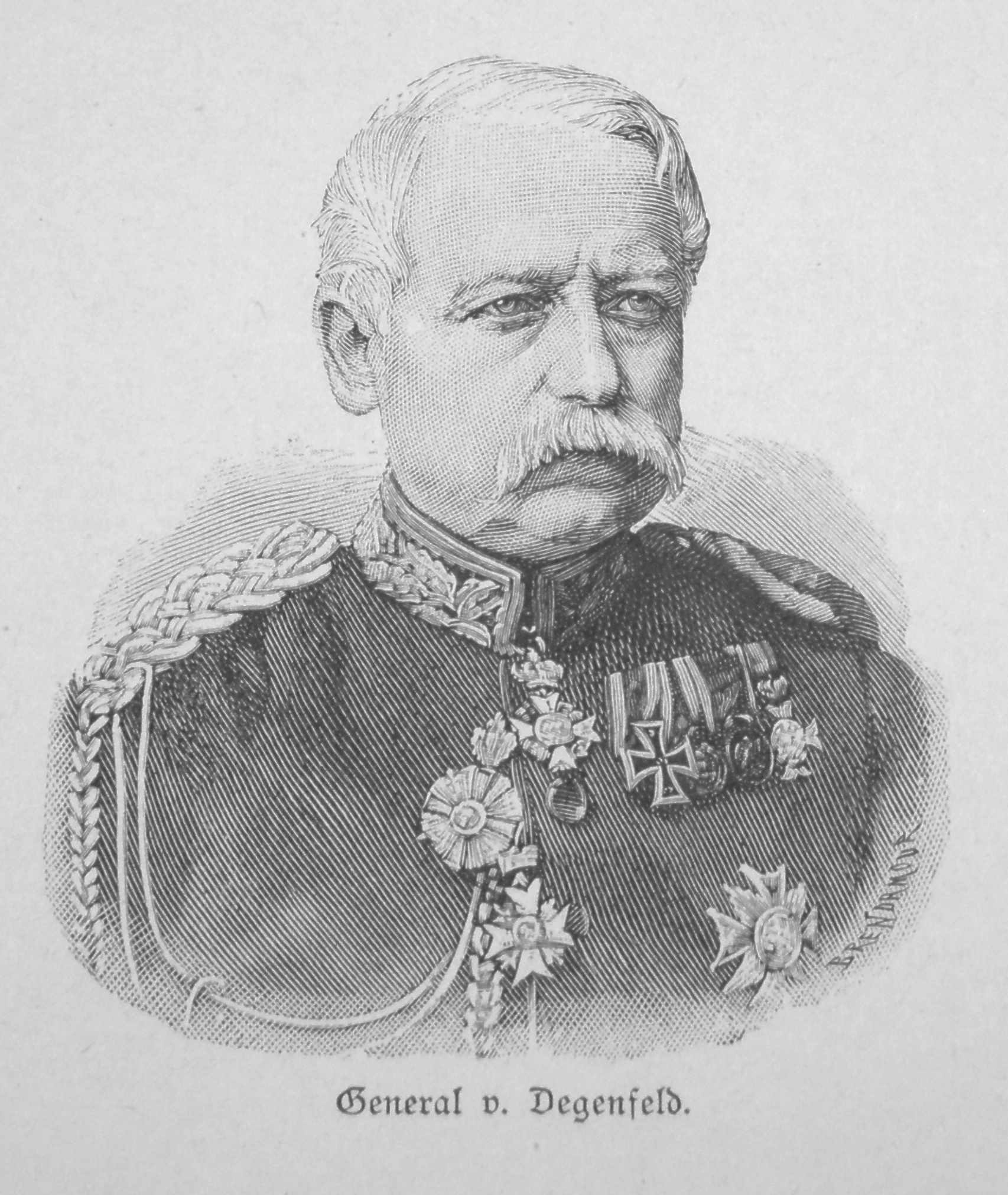
- Born: 9 February 1816; Gernsbach, Grand Duchy of Baden
- Died: 16 November 1888 (aged 72); Karlsruhe, Baden, German Empire
- Military career
- Allegiance: Baden; German Empire
- Branch: Baden Army; Imperial German Army
- Rank: Major General char. Lieutenant General
- Conflicts: Baden Revolution; Austro-Prussian War: Battle of Hundheim; Battle of Werbach; Battle of Gerchsheim; Franco-Prussian War: Battle of Nompatelize; Battle of Villersexel; Battle of the Lisaine
- Awards: Military Karl-Friedrich Merit Order; Iron Cross

Alfred Emil Ludwig Philipp Freiherr von Degenfeld (1816-1888) was a Badensian-Prussian general and a member of the Reichstag.

== Biography ==
=== Family ===
Alfred von Degenfeld was the younger son of Christoph Ferdinand IV. Philipp von Degenfeld (1772–1858) and his wife Augusta, née von Freystedt (1780–1861) and he was thus part of the Degenfeld noble family. His older brother Ferdinand Christoph died as early as 1844 as a result of a mental illness, so Alfred inherited the entire property of his father, consisting of the manorial estate on Neuhaus and the co-lordship on the Eulenhof, Ehrstädt, Unterbiegelhof, Waibstadt and Wagenbach. In 1861, he was the Fief of his fathers holdings and was thus the last fiefdom holder of the Degenfeld-Neuhaus line before the property became the property of the family in 1862.

=== Military career ===
Von Degenfeld joined the 3rd Infantry Regiment of the Baden Army in 1833 and had become a captain and company commander in the 1st Infantry Regiment by 1845. In 1848/49 he was involved in the campaign against revolutionary free troops. In 1849 he was temporarily retired, but then called back to the regiment's office. In 1850 he transferred to the 2nd Infantry Regiment when the Baden Army Corps was re-established, and in 1855 to the Leibgrenadier Regiment. In 1858 he was appointed major and in 1861 lieutenant colonel and commander of the 2nd Fusilier Battalion. In 1863 he led the Baden contingent of the Rastatt Fortress garrison, but was relieved of this command in 1864 due to a change of garrison. In 1865 von Degenfeld was promoted to colonel and given command of the Leibgrenadier Regiment. During the Austro-Prussian War the unit was part of the Baden Division under the command of the Prince Wilhelm and participated in the Campaign of the Main. There they fought in the Battle of Hundheim on 23 July 1866, the Battle of Werbach on 24 July and the Battle of Gerchsheim. In 1868 von Degenfeld was promoted to major general and commander of the 2nd Infantry Brigade.

In the Franco-Prussian War, von Degenfeld and his brigade were part of the Baden Field Division in the XIV Corps of General August von Werder. From 16 August to 27 September 1870 the brigade served in the Siege of Strasbourg. On 1 October 1870 von Degenfeld was despatched to the Vosges to disperse the Francs-tireurs who had gathered there. For this the XIV Corps sent a total of four brigades, reinforced by artillery and cavalry to enable independent operation.

The campaign against the Army of the Vosges under Giuseppe Garibaldi led to several smaller skirmishes, as the untrained and inconsistent French volunteers avoided facing a concentrated German unit in open battle. Places with noteworthy battles were Raon l'Etape, Nompatelize, St. Die, Etuz am Oignon, Pasques near Dijon and, together with the brigade of Prince Wilhelm von Baden, at Nuits against the division of the French general Camille Crémer. Then he participated in the Battle of Villersexel and afterwards was able to successfully break away together with the other German units and march on Belfort, creating a head start of two days in which a defensive position was built on the Lisaine.

In the Battle of the Lisaine, von Degenfeld commanded the right wing of the German position at Frahier from 15 to 17 January 1871. He was forced to vacate Chenebier on January 16 when the French Eastern Army tried to encompass his position. General von Degenfeld was able to hold against numerically far superior opponents for a period of about ten hours. The next day, reinforcements under General Adolf Keller managed to recapture the old position on the Lisaine in a counter-attack. For his work during the war, von Degenfeld received the Commander's Cross of the Military Karl-Friedrich Merit Order as well as both classes of the Iron Cross.

After the founding of the German Empire and the conclusion of peace the Baden Army was consolidated into the Prussian Army as part of the Imperial German Army. Von Degenfeld was, on 15 July 1871, made a Prussian major general and appointed commander of the 56th Infantry Brigade. On 18 October 1871 he received the character of a lieutenant general with his retirement.

== Later years ==
Afterwards von Degenfeld was a member of the Reichstag for the constituency of the Grand Duchy of Baden from 1887 until his death on 16 November 1888 in Karlsruhe.

== Bibliography ==
- "Men who have made the new German empire. A series of brief biographic sketches"
- Edmund Ollier, Cassell's history of the war between France and Germany, 1870-1871, 1871.
- Degenfeld in Meyers Konversationslexikon Band 4, Seite 873f
- Amtspresse Preußen Mitteilung vom 24. Januar 1872.
- Alfred Ludwig von Degenfeld in der Datenbank der Reichstagsabgeordneten
