= Nompatelize =

- Commune
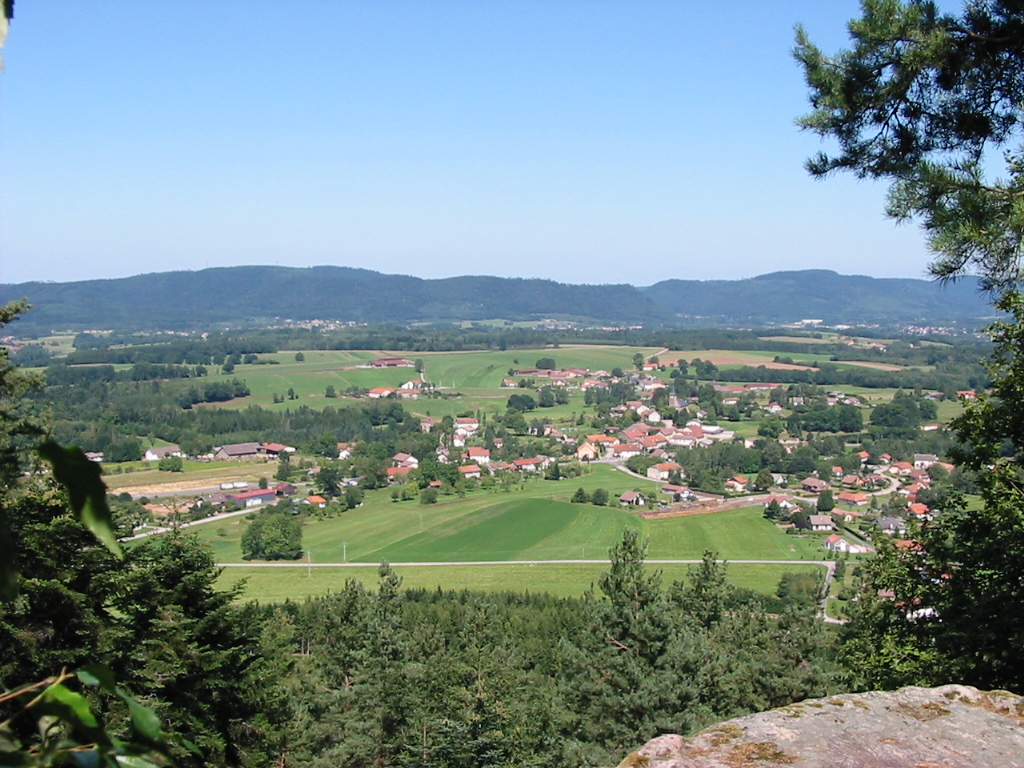
- Overview from the Petit Jumeau.

- Coat of arms
- Location of Nompatelize
- Location within France Location within Grand Est
- Coordinates: 48°19′33″N 6°51′13″E
- Country: France
- Region: Grand Est
- Department: Vosges
- Arrondissement: Saint-Dié-des-Vosges
- Canton: Raon-l'Étape
- Intercommunality: CA Saint-Dié-des-Vosges

Government
  - Mayor (2020–2026): Annie Gerardin
- Area^{1}: 6.91 km^{2} (2.67 sq mi)
- Elevation: 372 m (1,220 ft)
- Highest elevation: 520 m (1,710 ft)
- Lowest elevation: 301 m (988 ft)
- Population (2023): 547
  - Density: 79.2/km^{2} (205/sq mi)
- Time zone: UTC+01:00 (CET)
  - Summer (DST): UTC+02:00 (CEST)
- INSEE/Postal code: 88328 /88470
- ^{1} French Land Register data, which excludes lakes, ponds, glaciers > 1 km^{2} (0.386 sq mi or 247 acres) and river estuaries.

Nompatelize (French pronunciation: [nɔ̃patliz]) is a commune in the Vosges department in Grand Est in northeastern France.

Inhabitants from well-established local families are known as hauts-banais or hautes-banaises. This is a reference to the hilly territory in which the village is located and which at one time was owned by the nearby Étival Abbey. "Ban" is an old word for a territory while "haut" (high) is a reference to the uneven topography.

== Geography ==
The commune occupies an ancient volcanic plateau which has been coated at the edges with Permian sandstone deposits which become thicker to the south and east in the Permian basin of Saint-Dié.

The plateau is located between the valleys of the Meurthe and of the Valdange with views of Raon-l'Étape to the north and Saint-Dié-des-Vosges to the east. It is accessible to motorists travelling along the departmental road RD32 which connects Saint-Dié with the Haut du Bois Pass and the road to Rambervillers.

A principal source of employment is a car parts plant owned by the Faurecia company.

=== Geology and relief ===
The commune occupies a plateau of volcanic rocks covered at its edges by Permian sandstone deposits, which become very thick to the south and east in the Saint-Dié Permian basin. The center of Nompatelize sits atop a vent of the Permian volcano, once in a torrid environment spewing siliceous lava that was already highly petrified. This ignimbrite rhyolite, brought from deep magma chambers through narrow upwelling channels, accumulated in the southern vicinity of a thin band of Upper Ordovician schists and diorites that underwent significant compression and intense metamorphism beneath the mountain range formed during the Carboniferous period. The village is located west of Brehimont, a hamlet of Saint-Michel-sur-Meurthe situated on another volcanic cone.

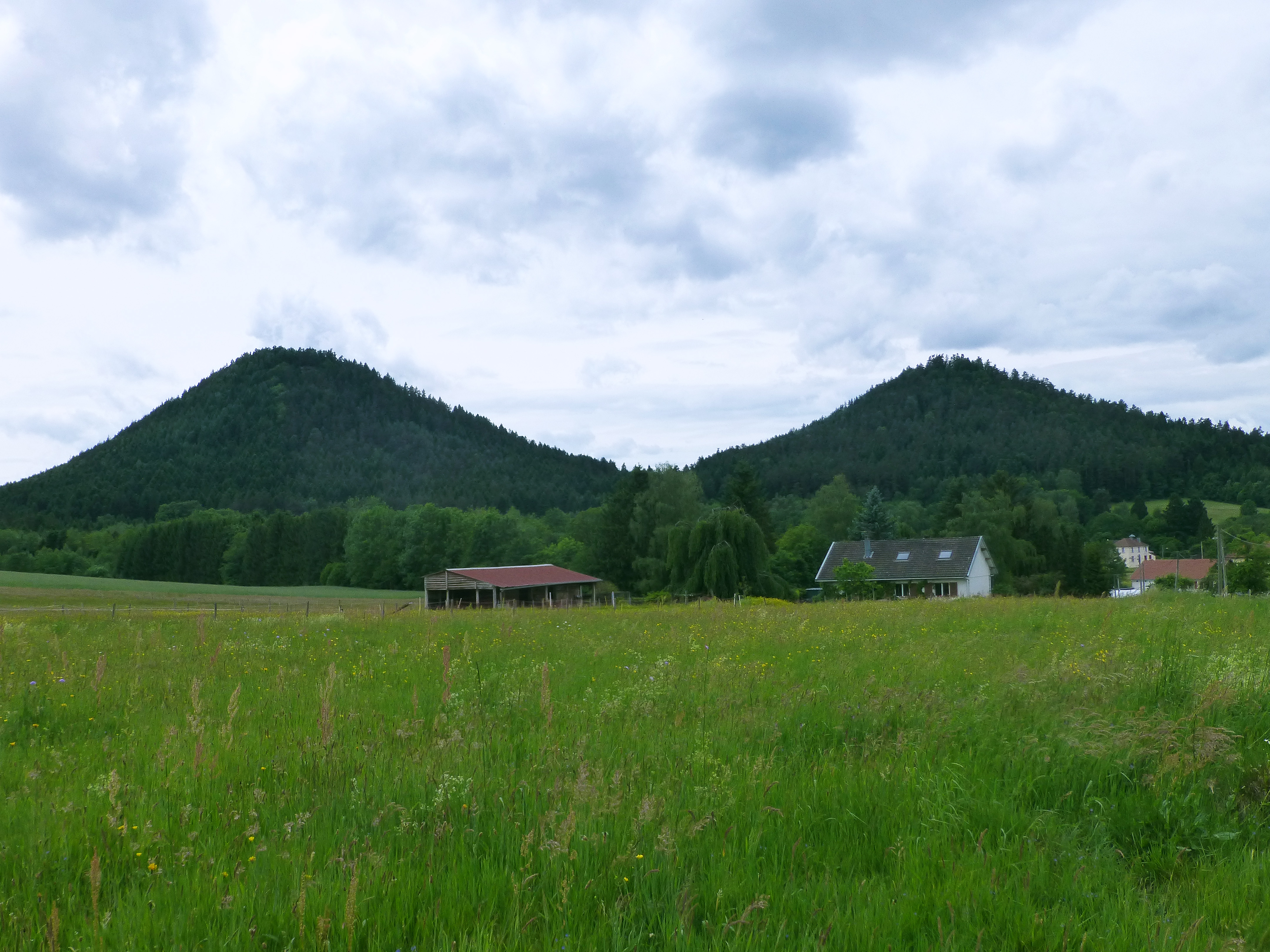
Les Jumeaux

The plateau's commanding position between the Meurthe and Valdange valleys, now traversed by the road between Saint-Dié and the Col du Haut du Bois pass, offers remarkable views to the north, particularly towards Raon-l'Étape, and also to the east towards Saint-Dié-des-Vosges.

The highest point within the commune's territory is the lower of the two small sandstone massifs known as the Twins, which extend the northern part of the vast Madeleine massif, continuing south beyond the Col du Haut Jacques pass. This region was formerly called Agne. The commune of Nompatelize, whose original community, patron of the Haut-Ban, long used and maintained an old timber-logging road from the sandstone mountains of the South, extends north of Saint-Michel-sur-Meurthe through the hamlet of Biarville, reaching the Meurthe at the place called Bourmont, an old port on the Meurthe whose altitude is only 301 meters.

=== Seismicity ===
Nompatelize is located in zone 3 of moderate seismicity.

=== Hydrography and groundwater ===
The commune is located in the Rhine watershed within the Rhine-Meuse basin. It is drained by the Meurthe River, the Valdange stream, the Biarville stream, and the Maubret stream.

The Meurthe River, with a total length of 160.6 km, rises in the commune of Le Valtin and flows into the Moselle River at Pompey, after passing through 53 communes.

The Valdange River, with a total length of 14.8 km, rises in the municipality of La Bourgonce and flows into the Meurthe River at Étival-Clairefontaine, after passing through five communes.

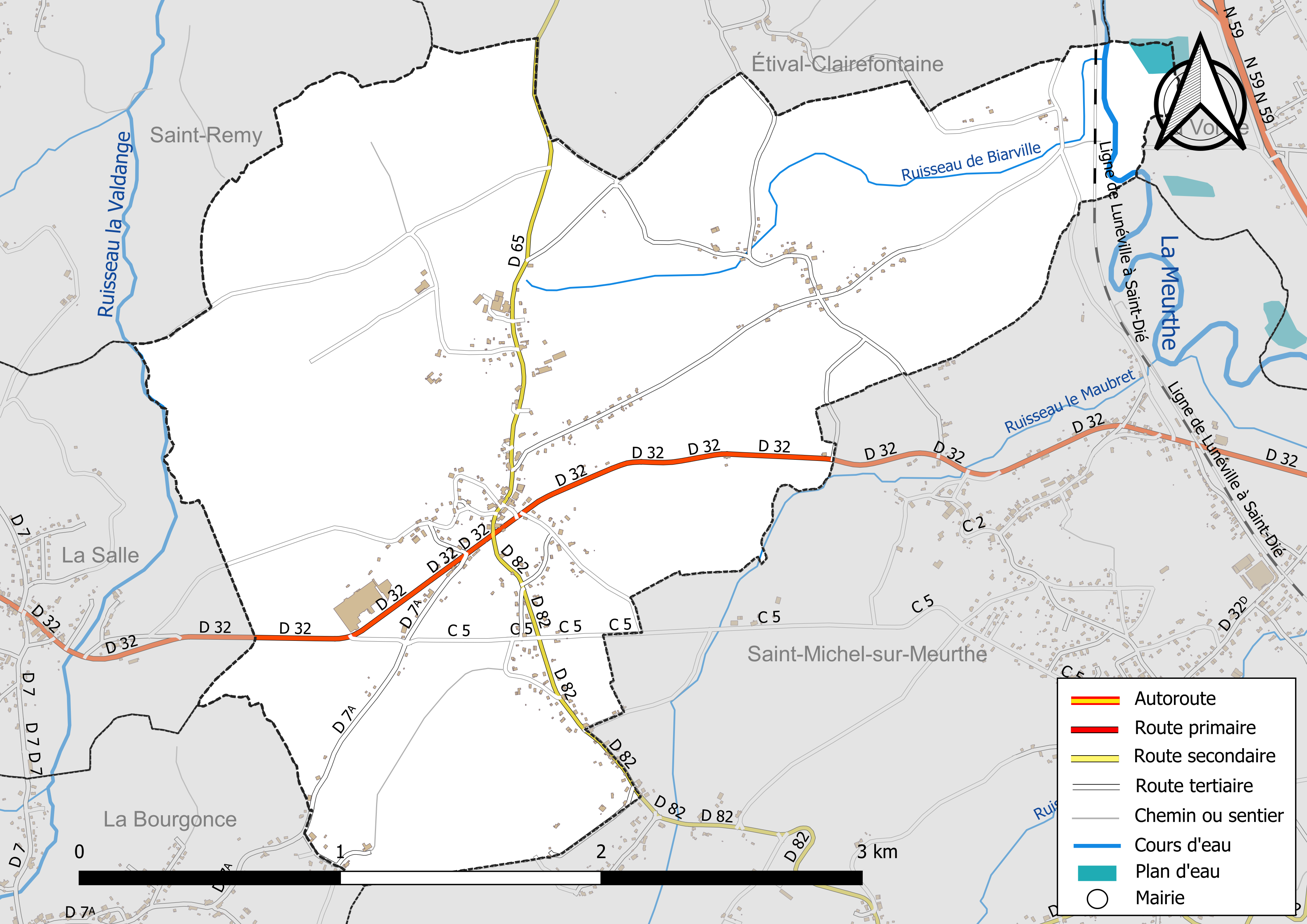
Hydrographic and road networks of Nompatelize.

The quality of bathing waters and watercourses can be consulted on a dedicated website managed by the water agencies and the French Agency for Biodiversity.

== Urban planning ==
=== Typology ===
As of January 1, 2024, Nompatelize is categorized as a rural commune with dispersed housing, according to the new seven-level municipal population density scale defined by INSEE in 2022. It belongs to the urban area of Saint-Dié-des-Vosges, an intra-departmental agglomeration comprising 16 communes, of which it is a suburban commune. Furthermore, the commune is part of the Saint-Dié-des-Vosges catchment area, of which it is a peripheral commune. This area, which includes 47 communes, is categorized as having a population between 50,000 and 200,000.

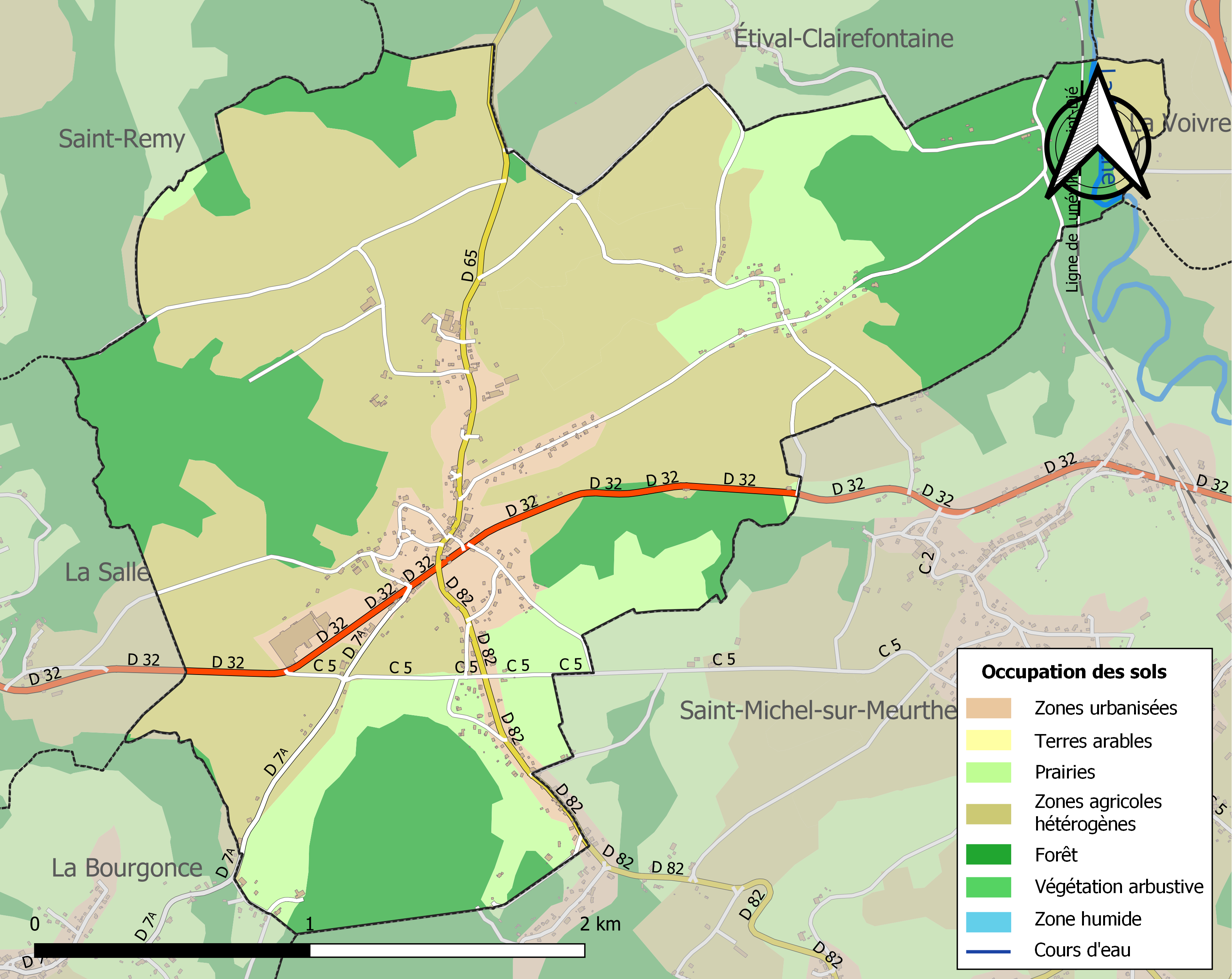
Map of land use and infrastructure in Nompatelize

== Name ==
Attested in the form Norpardi ecclesiae in 1140.

== History ==
=== Middle Ages ===
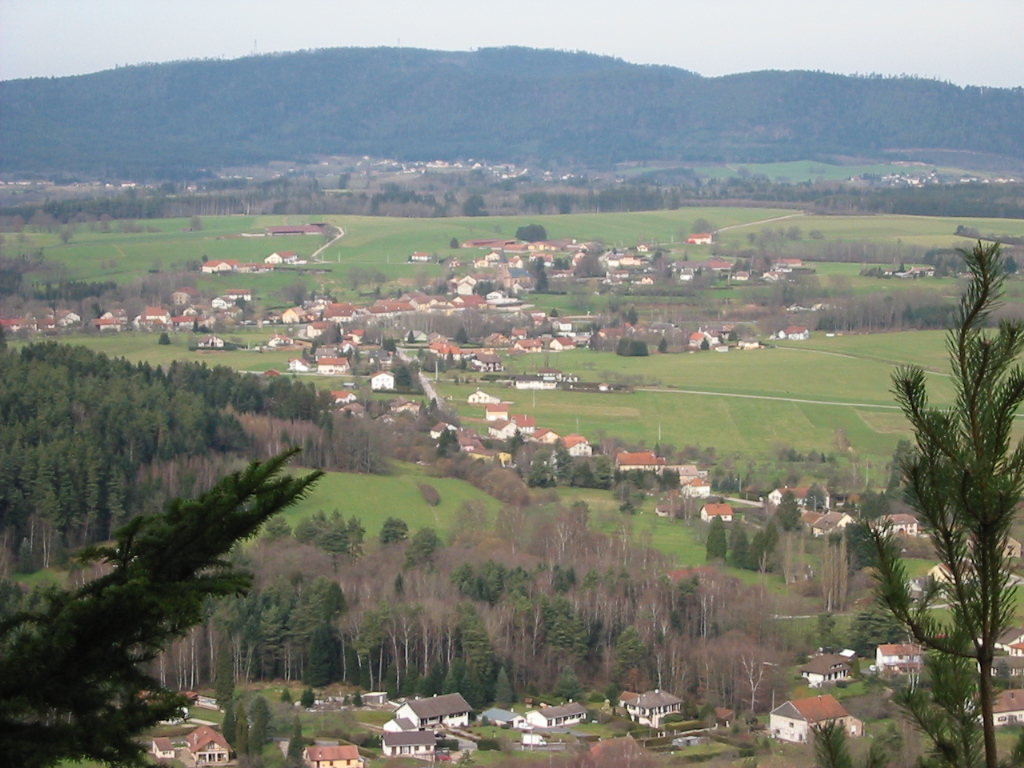
Overview from the Chemont rock.

Nompatelize appears to have been a villa or large estate, an old center of economic power situated in the middle of a cultivated plateau well before the 11th century. The region was already populated and administered during the Late Roman Empire. Long before the establishment of the Étival district in the 7th century or the religious donation of Saint Richarde to the chapter of Étival, it was dotted with modest hamlets, some of which still exist and others that have disappeared. Recent work in the Strasbourg archives has uncovered traces of Norpardi cellae or Norpard ecclesia in the 9th century. These local history studies lead to a modeling of the early autonomous territory of Nompatelize as a large estate. The hamlets would have been free or serf farmsteads, and the Feignes, derived from the term "fines," designating the ends—that is, the lands at the edges of the agricultural territory—would thus have been at the limits of the vast forest estate of Agne, which after the 12th century became the woods of Mortagne to the south and La Madeleine to the north. Its optimal expansion would have been on the plateau towards La Salle, La Bourgonce, and Bréhimont. This large estate and its grange were incorporated into the chapter of Étival, as established by Empress Richardis's charter in 886.

The Premonstratensian canons regular, summoned by the canonesses of Andlau, settled in the territory of Étival, expelling the former canons from Autrey in 1146. The Premonstratensian monks, dependent on Flabémont, under the leadership of Gilbert, assumed their apostolic mission after 1147, notably celebrating Mass and attracting skilled craftsmen and numerous lay brothers. The inhabitants, constantly overseen by the monks under a quasi-military regime, built permanent dwellings of stone, brick, and wood, covered with tile roofs rather than thatch, developed agricultural practices, and laid out stone roads necessary for the planned development of the landscape and the growth of construction and transport by cart and boat. The port of Bourmont allowed logs and planks from the forests of Mortagne to be floated down the Meurthe River.

No longer content with a modest chapel, the canons decided to build a church there in honor of their first founder, the pious Norbert of Xanten. For political reasons, they recognized the old community of men living on this higher part of their territory and seem to have cleverly conflated Norpardi ecclesia and Norberti ecclesia, the assembly of Norbert. It is likely that the apparent homophony between Norpardi and Norberti was conducive to the evangelical work and to the local recognition of the sacred authority of the white canons. Nompatelize was also temporarily recognized as an essential hierophany and a vital center of the abbey's territory.

Grain production increased, and barns multiplied in the 13th century. The techniques and skills of the Premonstratensian monks had already served as a model for the entire mountain region. The exploitation of the Mortagne forests allowed for the export of planks to the port of Bourmont on the Meurthe River. The town, already designated as the chief town of the high district, formerly located along an old road, became a spur of the route connecting Rambervillers to Colmar.

Therefore, having freed themselves from the control of the canonesses of Andlau, who originally owned two-thirds of the district, by accepting a heavy payment of seigneurial dues in cash, the chapter and the abbot, still dependent on Flabémont, decided to dedicate themselves to the contemplative life recommended by their mother abbey. They secluded themselves in their beautiful abbey at Étival, only to emerge a few decades later, ruined by the lords who had seized a large share of their property and revenues. The impoverished monks then entered a period of religious decline, losing their renown and reputation, first among the common people and then, after excommunication by the chapter, among the powerful and those responsible for civil authority.

A recovery was undertaken by the abbot. The canons borrowed from the collegiate church of Saint-Dié, from the merchants of Bruyères, Rambervillers, and Raon-l'Étape, and slowly, step by step, bought back the feudal shares, regained control of the parish of Nompatelize, and restored the chapels in the surrounding area. They regained their seigneurial power and exercised their sovereign justice throughout the 15th century.

In 1478, Brother Didier Moyen, parish priest of Nompatelize, established a foundation in agreement with the Étival convent to preserve the house, chapel, and fountain of Bouilly. This chapel, dedicated to the Virgin Mary, located above Nompatelize, which at the time boasted large farms and agricultural holdings, was central to the concerns of this wealthy canon. He contributed to the chapel's upkeep, particularly its lighting and roof, stipulated that Mass be said there weekly, and, most importantly, that on the feast days of Our Lady, Easter Monday, and New Year's Day, the prior and chapter would travel there, in addition to organizing a pilgrimage carrying the heavy cross on Whit Monday. Abbot Gérard d'Essey opposed what he likely considered a whim, but the chapter nonetheless signed the agreement. From this symbolic moment onward, the community once again held most of the sacred powers over the upper territory of Étival, which also included the communities of Hoste du Bois (La Salle), La Bourgonce, and Saint-Michel. It also maintained its key economic role, with its crop cultivation, livestock farming, and control of timber transport.

=== Modern era ===
The abbey of Étival reached its zenith at the beginning of the 16th century, when the influence of Flabémont waned. The abbey weathered the hardships of the 17th century, while its leadership embraced the reforms of Servais de Lairuelz. The plateau was devastated after 1633, but was quickly repopulated by the end of the century.

By the mid-18th century, the plateau was intensively cultivated and densely populated. The inhabitants of Haut Ban continued to attend the court sessions at Étival until 1747, when the abbey's estate passed into commendam to Bishop Bégon of Toul. Haut Ban appears to have been attached to the provostship of Saint-Dié, and the distinct entity of Étival disappeared definitively with the establishment of the Bishopric of Saint-Dié in 1776. Nompatelize became a commune during the French Revolution. She bought a safe to lock away her archives and suffered the hardships of wartime requisitions.

In 1786, atop the Twins stood a standing stone known throughout the region as the Horse Stone. It was an enormous Druidic table, 8 meters long and 5 meters wide, placed on two very tall pillars. It was destroyed that same year to provide building materials for the church in Nompatelize.

=== Wartime ===
The Nompatelize plateau was a battlefield or site of fighting on three occasions:

On October 6, 1870, the Battle of La Bourgonce and Nompatelize also took place across a large part of the plateau, from Saint-Rémy to Saint-Michel-sur-Meurthe, passing through La Salle. It resulted in 1,500 French deaths, primarily from the 34th Deux-Sèvres National Guard under General Dupré and the 32nd Line Infantry Regiment under Colonel Hocédé. The Baden troops under General Degenfeld, initially overwhelmed by the French assaults in the afternoon, but supported by artillery effectively positioned above the Saint-Michel ravine to neutralize the few French cannons on the flank of the Twin Peaks, suffered a third of their losses. The lack of realism in command and the unpreparedness of the French troops explain the afternoon's rout following the arrival of Baden infantry reinforcements. General Dupré, wounded and then replaced by Hocédé who was fatally struck down, made it possible to clear the Vosges in a few days by part of the new thirteenth German army created after the capitulation of Strasbourg, because General Cambriels, learning the news in Épinal, ordered the withdrawal.

Commemoration of the Battle of Nompatelize (1870).

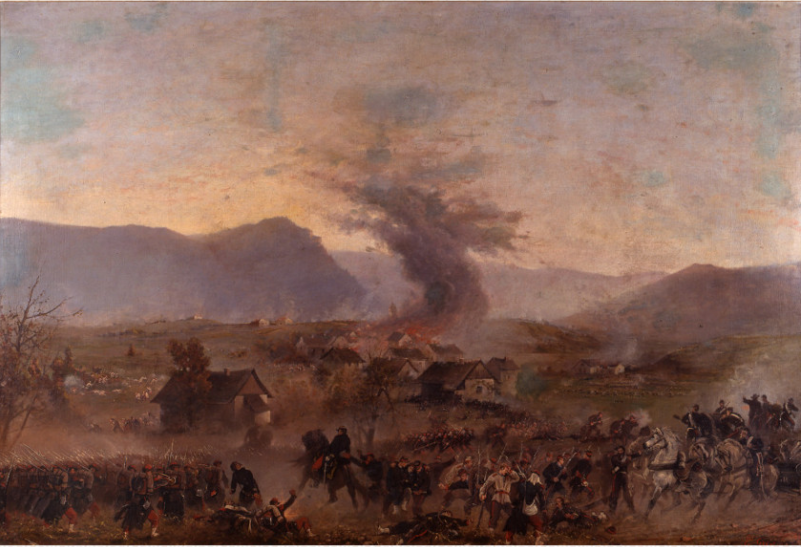
The Meurthe mobile battalion at the Battle of Nompatelize.

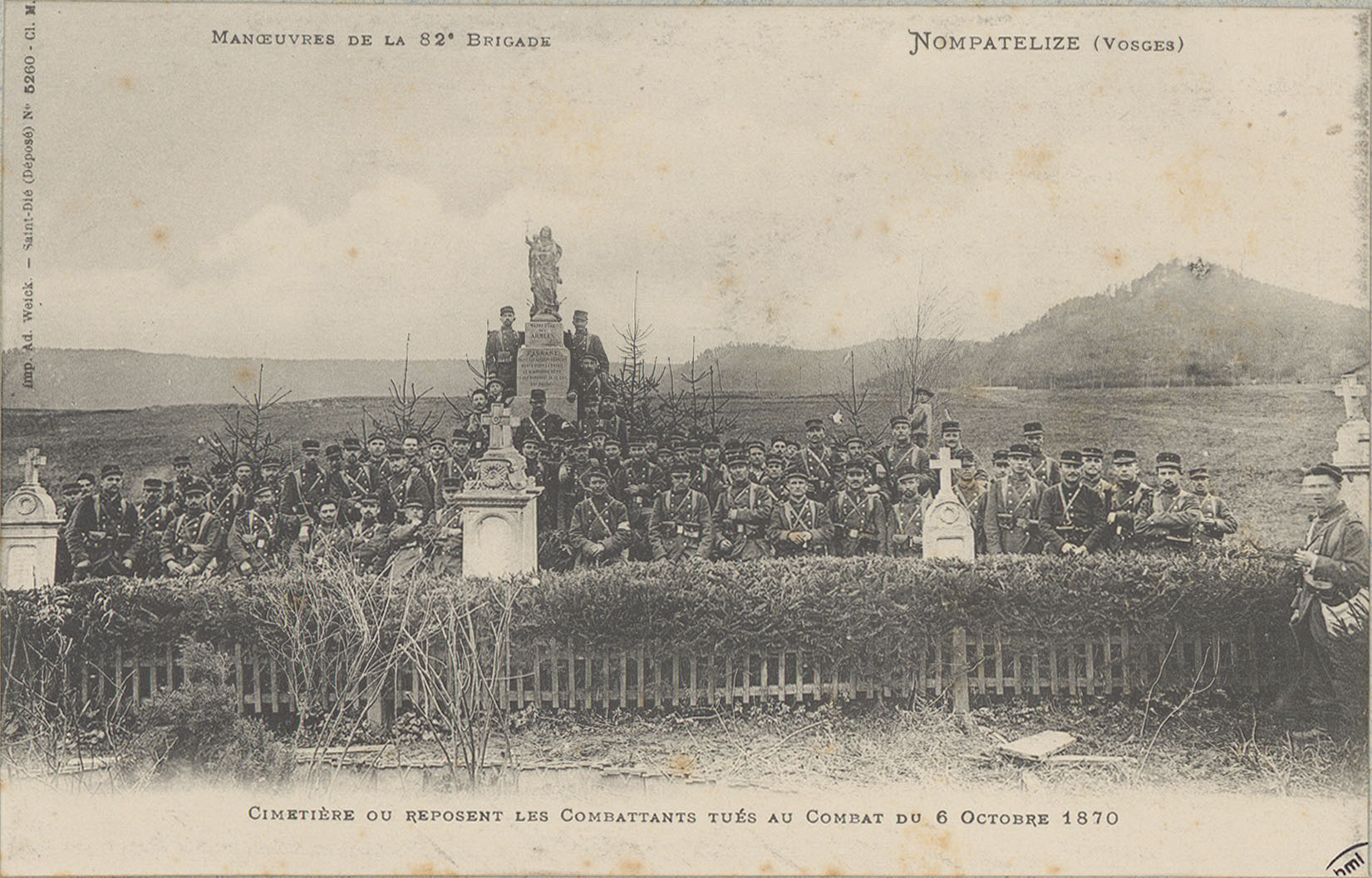
Maneuvers of the 82nd Brigade, Cemetery where the combatants killed in the battle of October 6, 1870, rest.

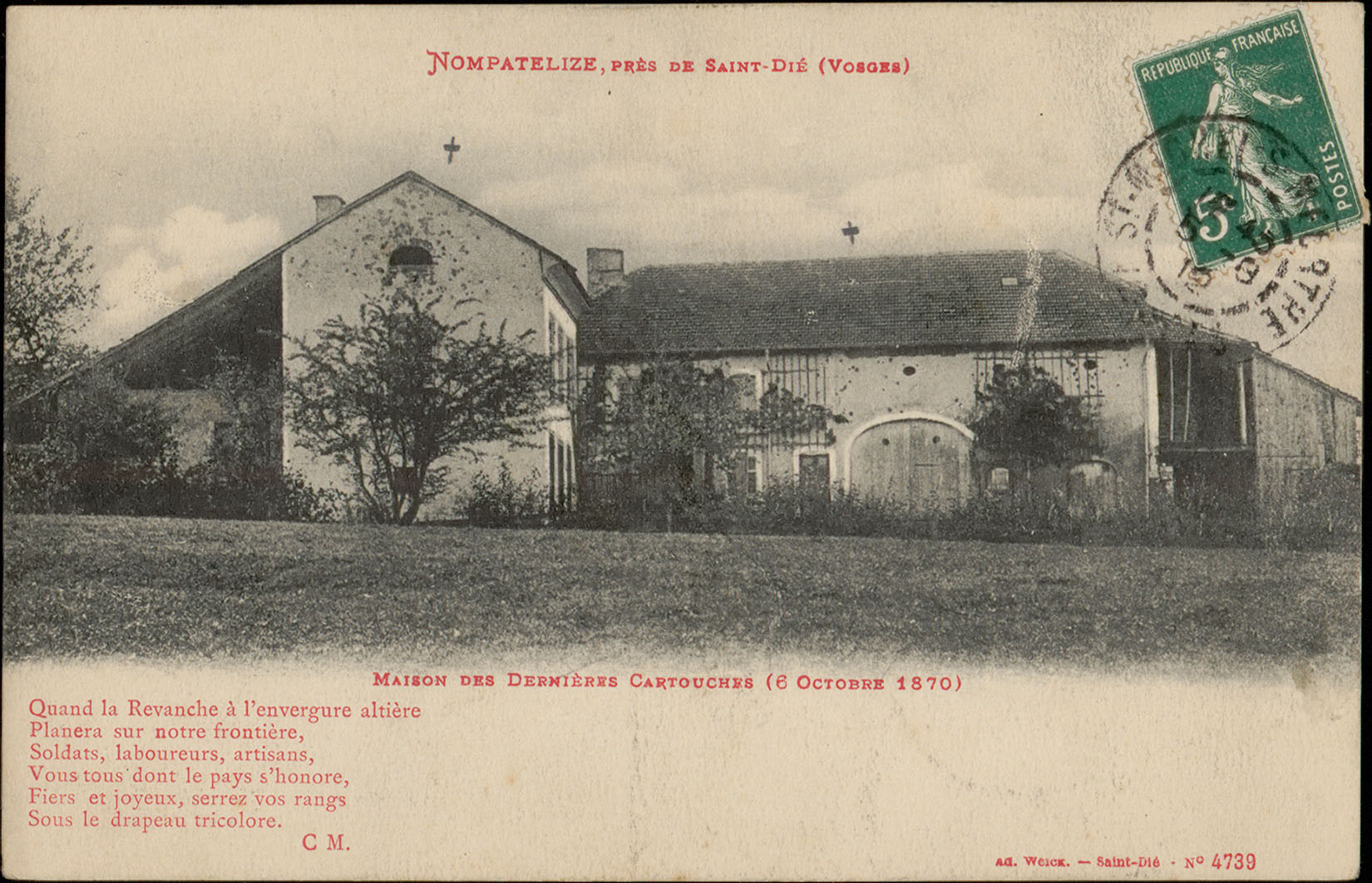
House of the last cartridges (October 6, 1870) - Ad. Weick photographic collection.

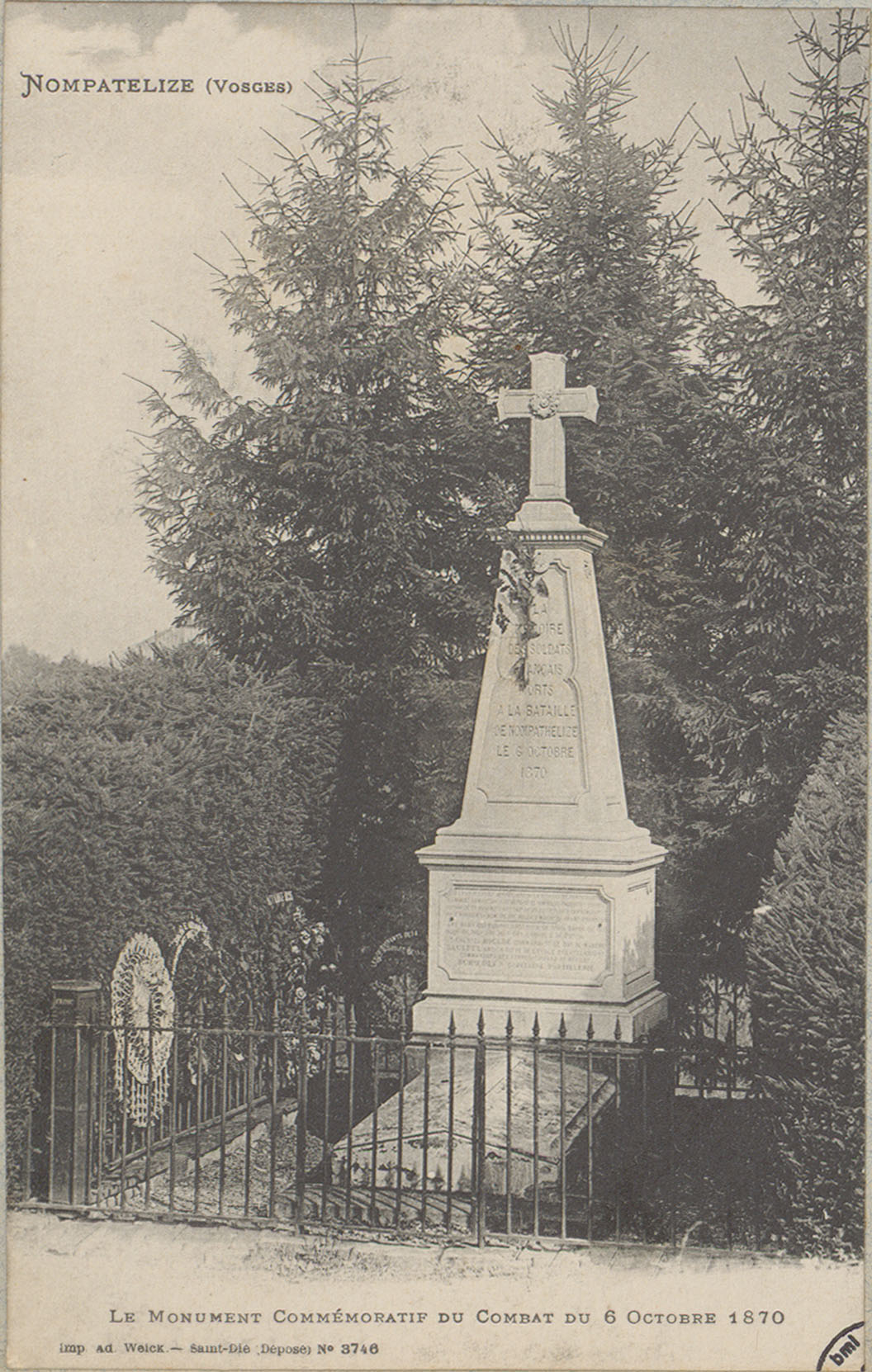
The memorial to October 6, 1870.

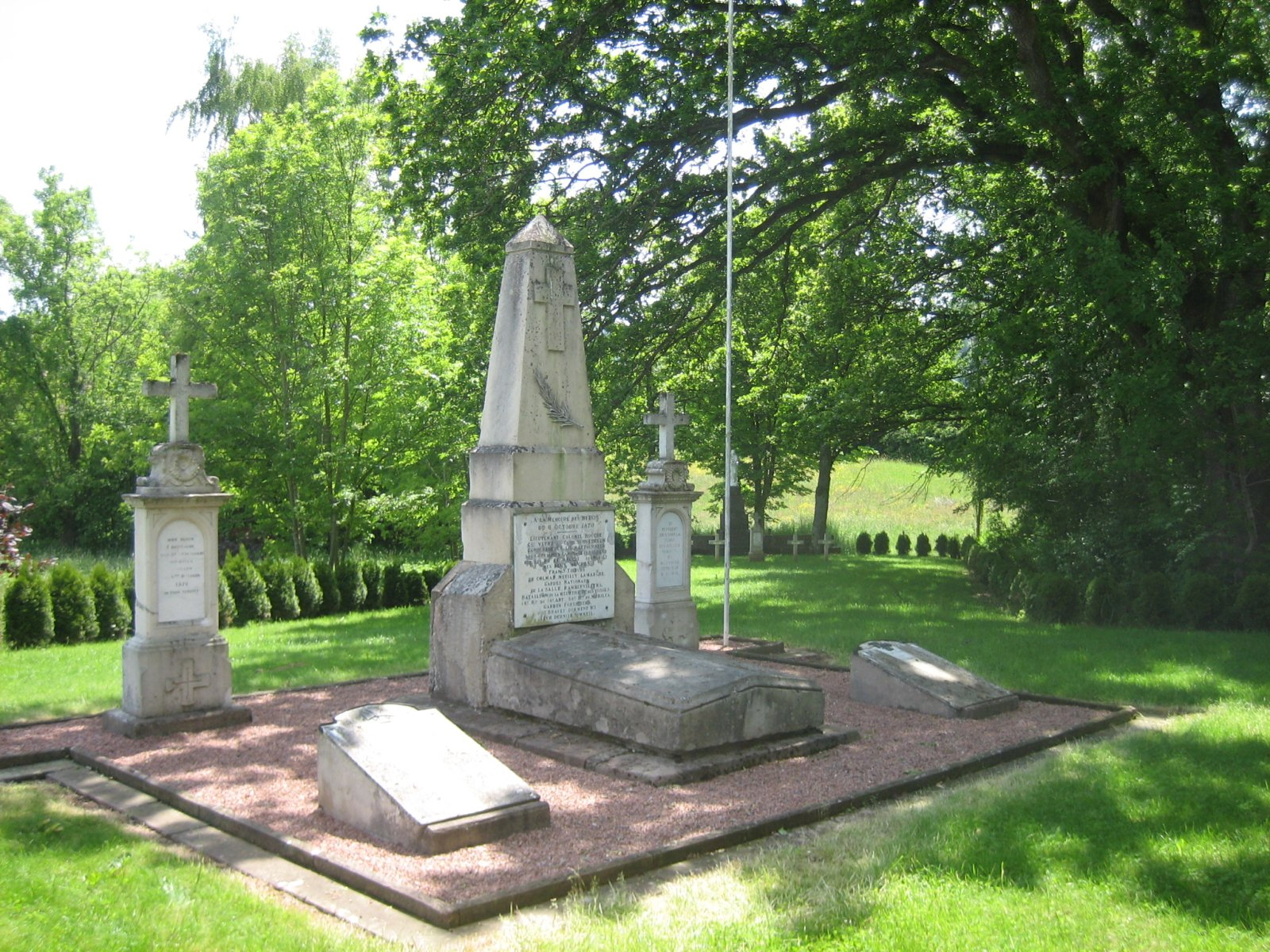
War memorial 1870.

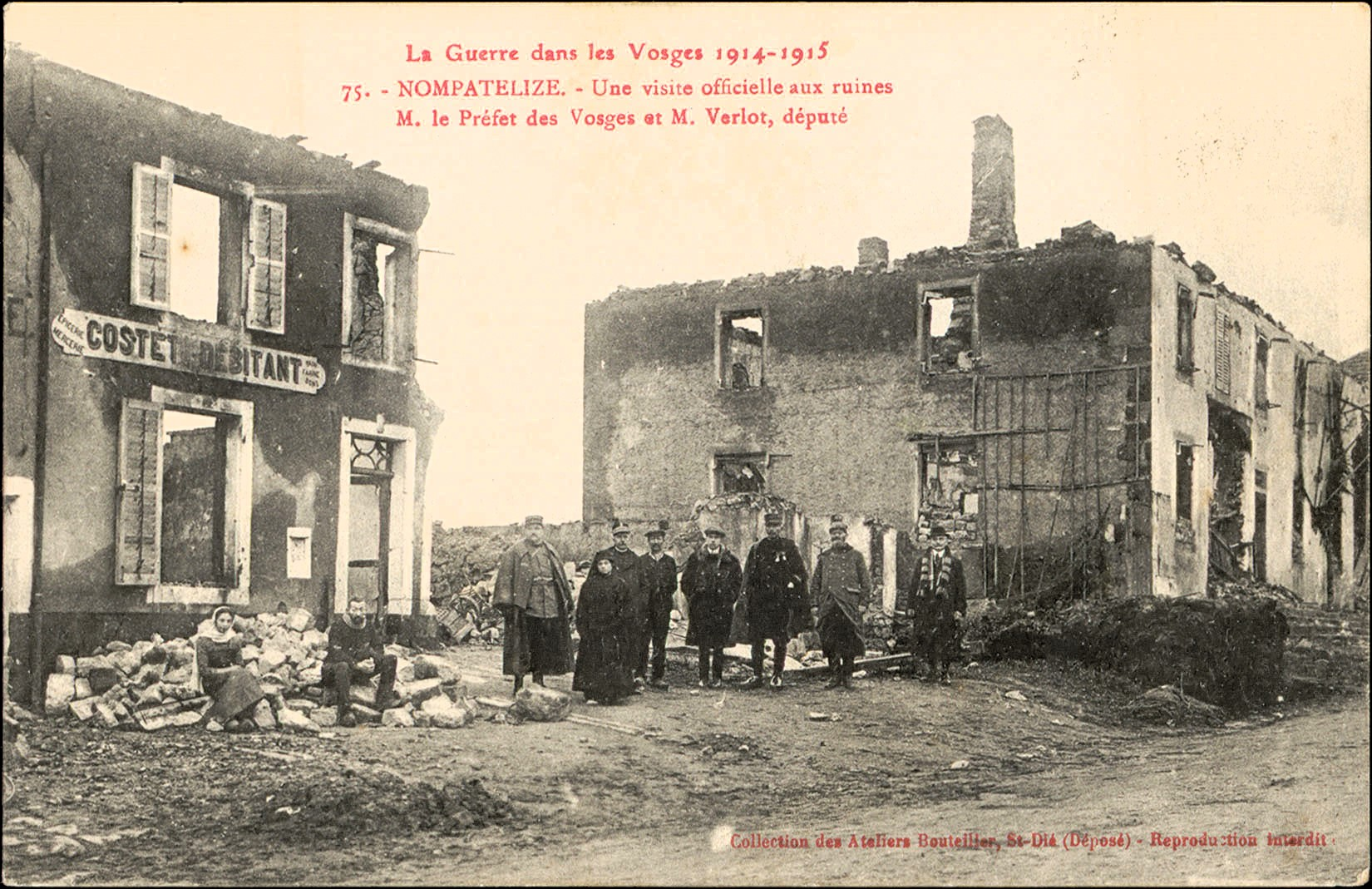
Official visit to the ruins by the prefect and the deputy Verlot (1914-1915).

- After a long retreat following the thunderous offensives at the beginning of the First World War, the French Army of the East dug in here, from August 25 to September 12, 1914, on a vast defensive front on the reverse side of the western flank of the occupied Meurthe Valley, from the heights of Mortagne to the emblematic Chipotte Pass. Putting on fierce resistance, the infantry battalions were forced to give way at the cost of heavy losses. The German troops did not pursue the advance towards Rambervillers and Épinal, and received orders to withdraw, while remaining in contact, as the German high command understood the futility of a difficult advance while the German breakthrough through the Oise Valley was opening the way to Paris. But the German strategy was soon uncovered, and the surplus infantry units were able to help to reinforce and restructure the French defenses, which had been shaken by the German offensive in Champagne.

The town was officially awarded the Croix de Guerre 1914-1918 on June 16, 1921.

Following a moving speech by the mayor of Nompatelize, Bernard Gérardin, recalling the suffering endured during the 1914 occupation and the 22 deaths from the town during the four years of the world conflict, General Jacquot, the government delegate tasked with pinning the Croix de Guerre on the town, read the text from the official gazette on Sunday, August 28, 1921, from the makeshift platform set up by Vosges officials in front of the town hall, which was decorated with greenery, garlands, and flags: "Nompatelize (Vosges) was the scene of fierce fighting in 1914, which severely damaged it. Through the admirable moral conduct of its inhabitants, two of whom were executed during the enemy occupation, it has earned the gratitude of the nation."

November 3, 1944, with the arrival of American units during World War II.

== Society ==
=== Education ===
Educational institutions:

- Preschools and primary schools in Saint-Remy, La Bourgonce, La Voivre, Saint-Michel-sur-Meurthe, and Étival-Clairefontaine.
- Middle schools in Saint-Dié-des-Vosges and Raon-l'Étape.
- High schools in Saint-Dié-des-Vosges and Raon-l'Étape.

=== Health ===
Healthcare professionals and facilities:

- Doctors in Saint-Michel-sur-Meurthe, Étival-Clairefontaine, Raon-l'Étape, and Moyenmoutier.
- Pharmacies in Saint-Michel-sur-Meurthe, Étival-Clairefontaine, Raon-l'Étape, and Moyenmoutier.
- Hospitals in Raon-l'Étape, Senones, Baccarat, and Rambervillers.

== Economy ==
=== Businesses and shops ===
==== Agriculture ====
- Cereal, legume, and oilseed farming.
- Other non-permanent crops.
- Organic farming.
- Forestry and other forestry activities.
- Dairy farming.
- Raising other cattle and buffalo.
- Raising other animals.

==== Tourism ====
- Accommodation and catering in Les Rouges-Eaux, La Voivre, Denipaire, Raon-l'Étape, Jeanménil, Senones.

==== Shops ====
- Faurecia automotive plant (site closed in December 2015).
- Local shops and services.

== Culture and sights ==
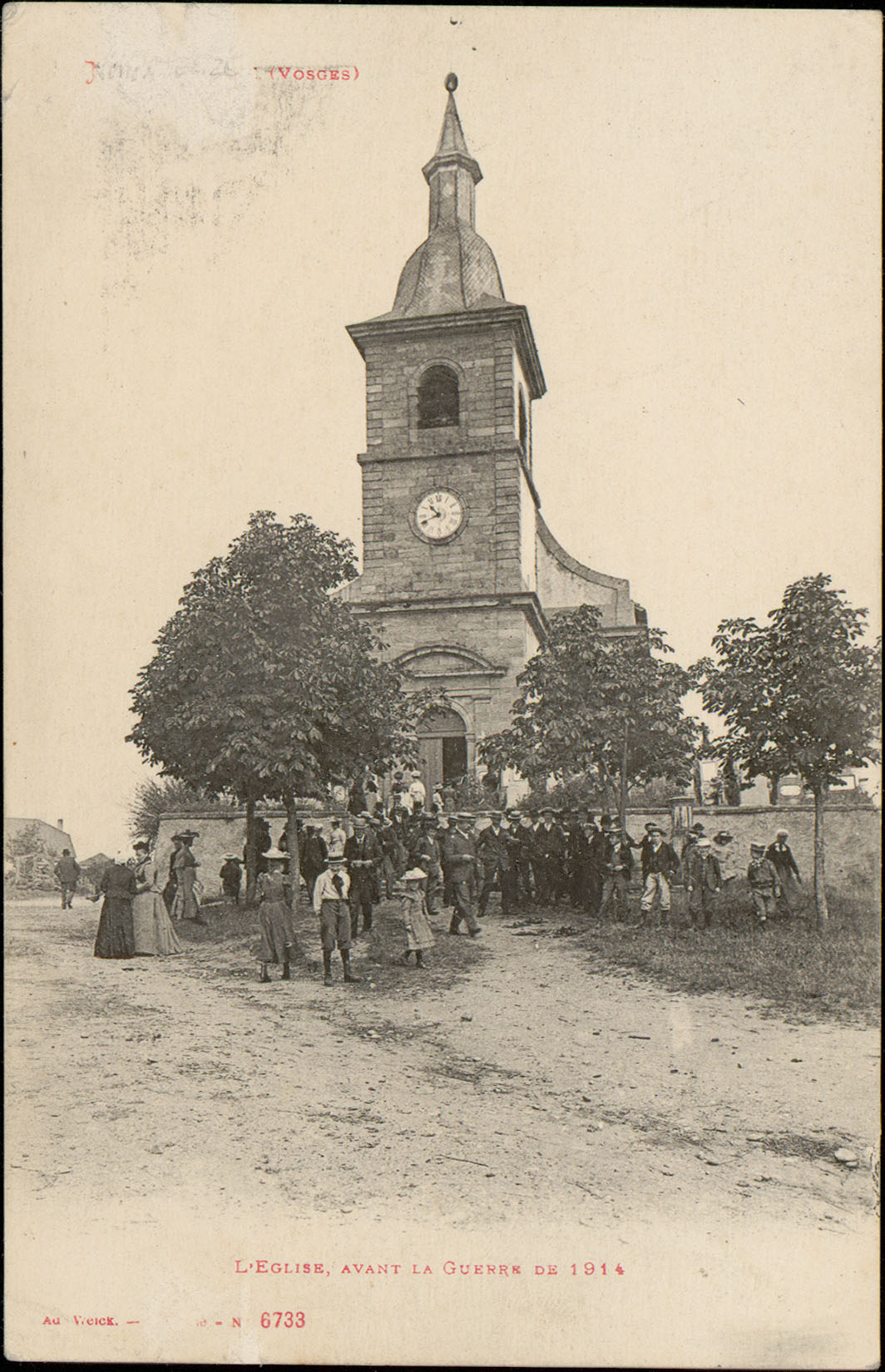
The church before the war of 1914-1918 (A. Weick).

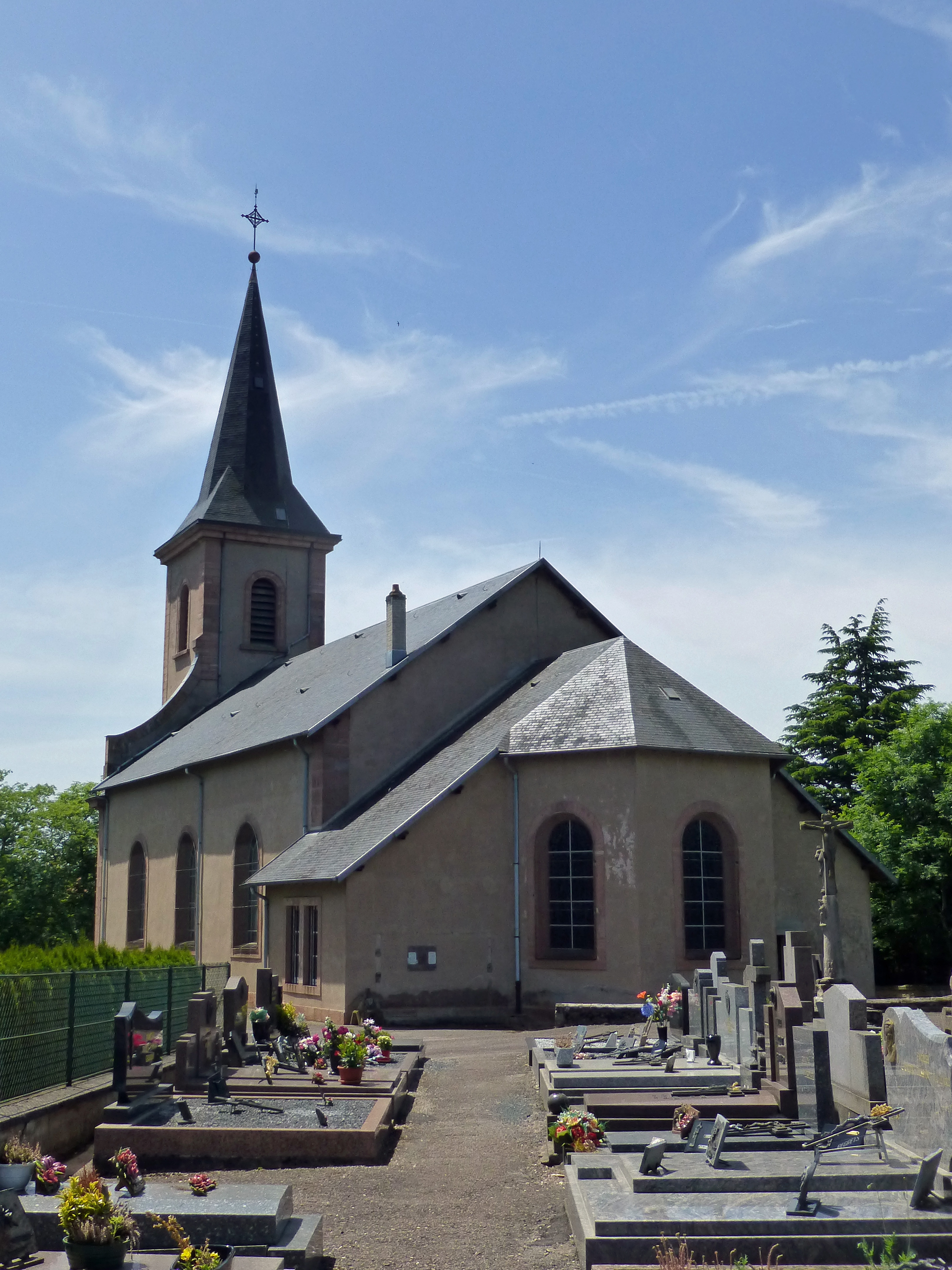
Saint-Èvre Church today.

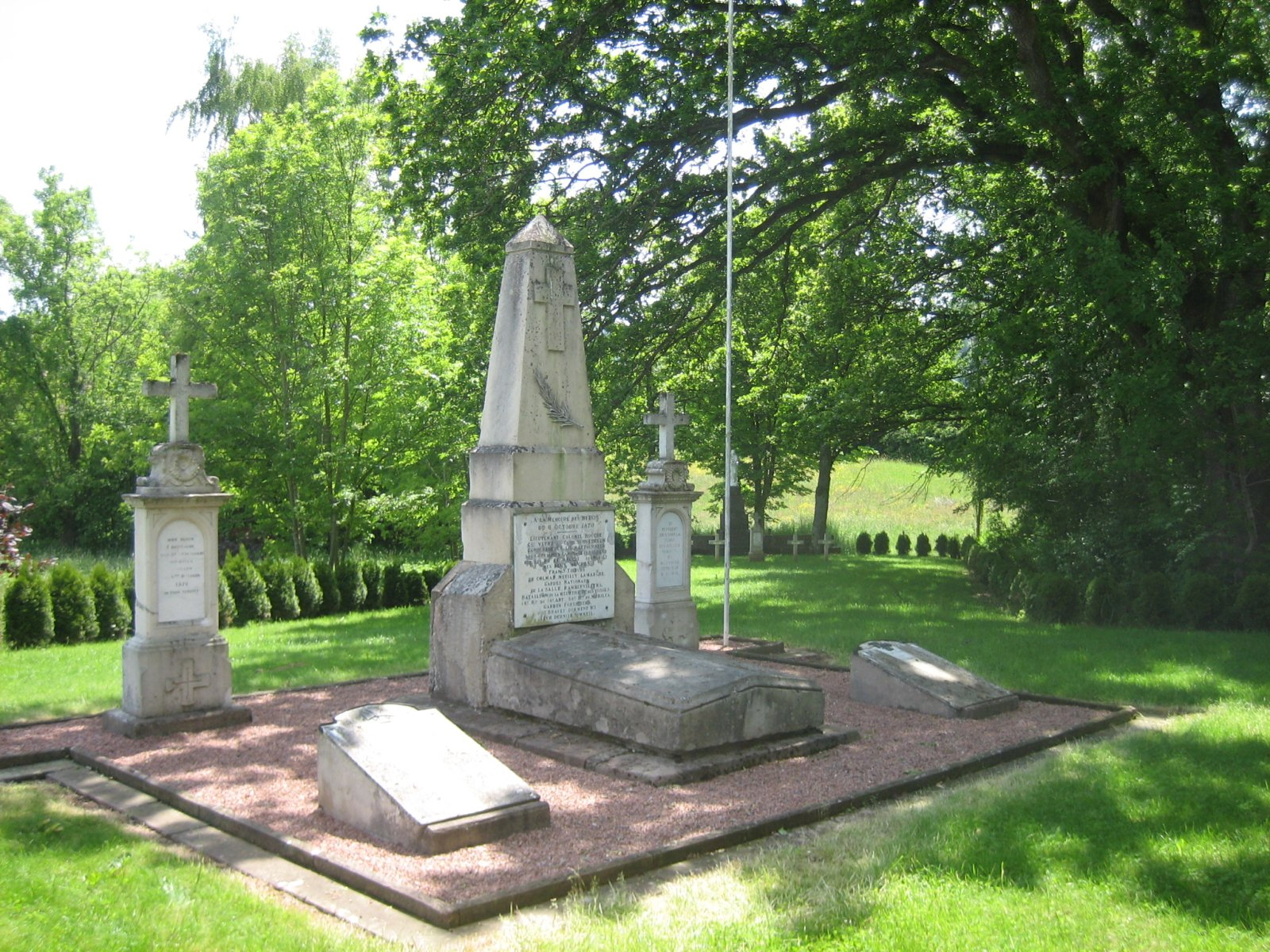
War memorial.

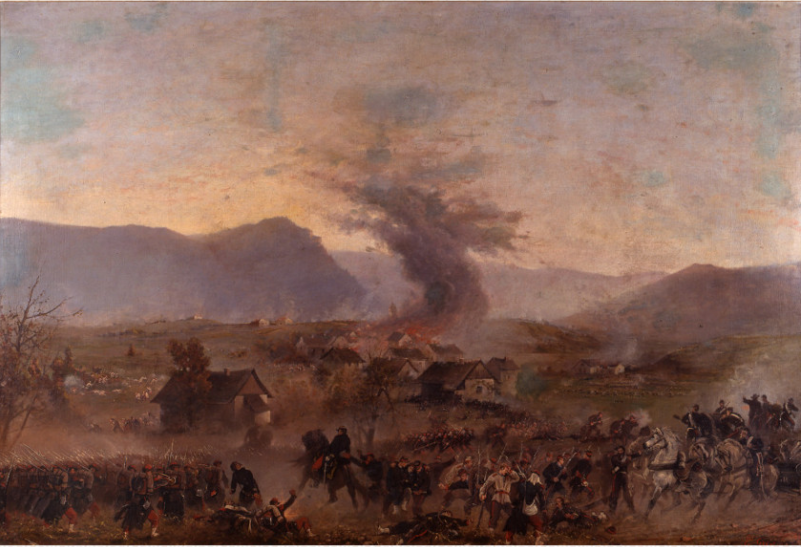
The Meurthe mobile battalion at the Battle of Nompatelize, October 6, 1870. Painting by Joseph-Émile Gridel.
- The Church of Saint-Èvre, with its bell tower, was built in 1786 and its nave rebuilt in 1930, and its organ.
- Franco-German military cemetery.
- Memorials.
- Rural architectural heritage listed by the General Inventory of Cultural Heritage service: Farms.

== Heraldry ==
| Arms of Nompatelize | Or, a pomegranate azure on the dexter side and a fir tree eradicated vert on the sinister side; on a chief gules a crosier or flanked in chief by a snowflake argent and on the sinister side by a dove in flight of the same. Created by Robert André Louis and adopted on October 4, 2016. |

== See also ==
- Communes of the Vosges department
