= Tauá =

Municipality in Ceará, Brazil

- Municipality and city
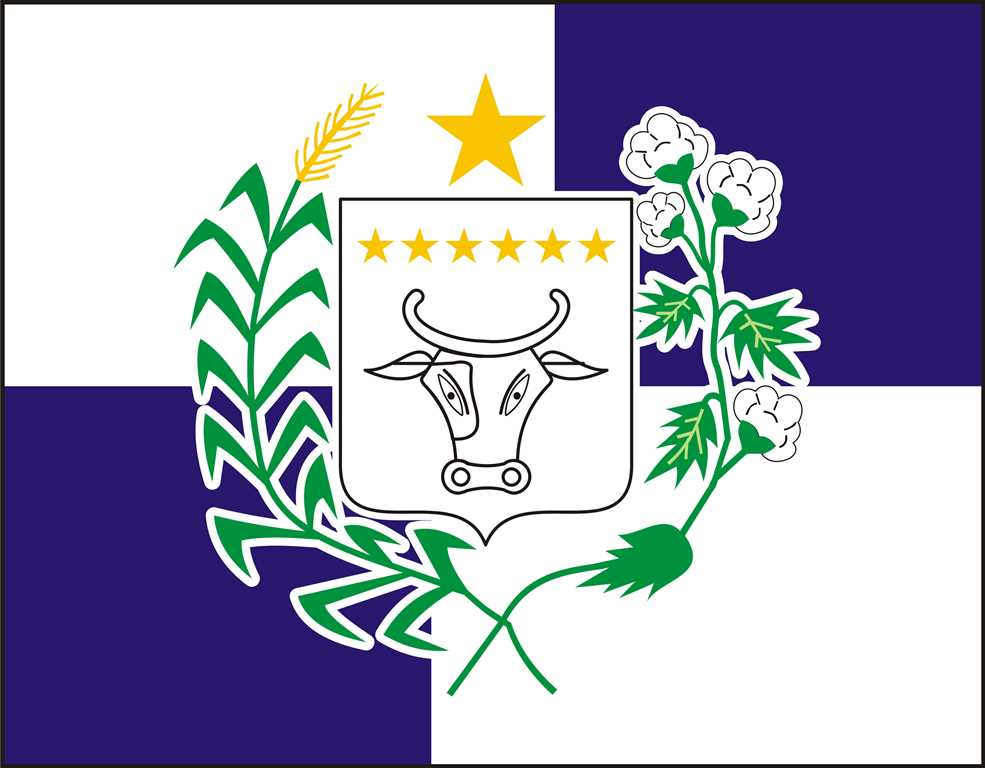
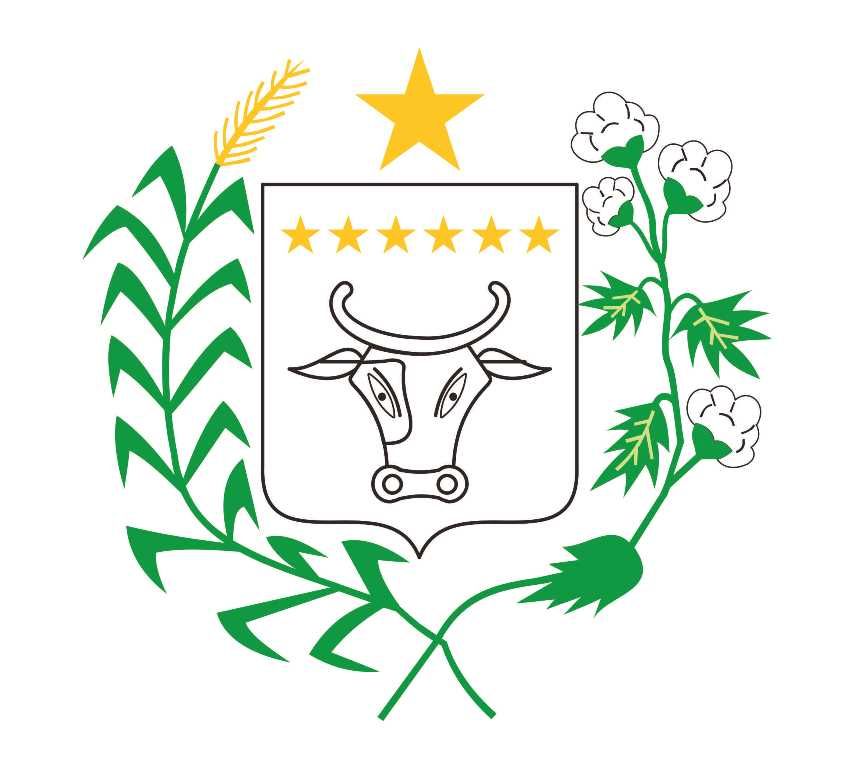
- Flag Coat of arms

- Municipal location

- Location in Brazil
- Coordinates: 6.00278°S 40.2928°W
- Country: Brazil
- Region: Nordeste
- State: Ceará
- Mesoregion: Sertoes Cearenses

Area
  - Total: 1,551.431 sq mi (4,018.188 km^{2})
- Elevation: 1,319 ft (402 m)

Population (2020)
  - Total: 59,062
  - Density: 35.9/sq mi (13.88/km^{2})
- Time zone: UTC−3 (BRT)

Tauá is a municipality in the state of Ceará in the Northeast region of Brazil. In 2020 it had an estimated population of 59,062 people. It is one of the largest municipalities in the state, with an area of 4,018.188 square kilometres (1,551.431 sq mi).

== History ==
The toponymy of Tauá refers to an indigenous word meaning "yellow clay and loam" in the Tupi language. Its origins date from at least the early 18th century. On December 14, 1801, Ouvidor Gregório José da Silva went to the small settlement of Tauá to raise the site to a town. On May 3, 1802, it became a formal settlement. On August 17, 1832, it was given freguesia status. On December 2, 1889, the site was renamed São João do Príncipe dos Inhamuns. It received the classification of city on August 2, 1929, returning to its former name.

== Geography ==
The city is located 337 kilometres (209 mi) away from the capital of Ceará State, Fortaleza. The town lies along BR-020, 60.8 kilometres (37.8 mi) by road northeast of Parambu. Districts of the municipality include Marrecas, Barra Nova, Trici, Marruás, Carrapateiras, Inhamuns, and Santa Tereza. The Jaguaribe River's headwaters are located in the Tauá districts of Trici and Carrapateiras. At Tauá, the Jaguaribe is sandy and rather narrow, 50–100 metres (160–330 ft) in width. The course of the river between Tauá to the mouth of the Salgado River is approximately 250 kilometres (160 mi).

The biggest natural landmark is the mountain range, Serrote Quinamuiú. It became protected by municipal law in 2005. In 2011, the unauthorized extraction of precious stones, such as amethyst, became a matter of concern to environmentalists and the local government as the use of dynamite caused serious damage to the mountain's physical structure.

== Economy ==
According to the government statistics in 1996, the per capita income in Tauá was far below the minimum established income. Carrapateiras suffers from overgrazing and poor market accessibility. The municipality contains the first solar photovoltaic power plant to generate electricity on a commercial scale in Brazil, MPX Tauá, inaugurated in August 2011. Tauá has three local radio stations, Rádio Difusora dos Inhamuns, Rádio Trici FM, and Cultura dos Inhamuns 960.

== Transportation ==
The city is served by Pedro Teixeira Castelo Airport.

== Landmarks ==
The municipality has three paleontological and archeological sites which can be visited but can only be explored by researchers and professionals with a permit. A donation by Sergeant Major José Rodrigues de Matos enabled the construction of a chapel dedicated to Nossa Senhora do Rosário (Our Lady of the Rosary), located in the municipal cemetery. Igreja de Nossa Senhora do Rosário (Church of Our Lady of the Rosary) was inaugurated on October 17, 1762. Originally constructed with a cylindrical domed roof, it was expanded in 1906. The structure is listed as a protected cultural monument by the Brazilian government. The Igreja de Jesus (Church of Jesus) in the Tauá district of Marrecas was built in the early eighteenth century, around 1717. The first parish priest was Father Fructuoso Ribeiro Dias.

== Culture ==
The feast of Jesus, Mary and Joseph is held every year in April, one of the biggest religious events in the state of Ceará. Our Lady of the Rosary, whose day is celebrated on October 7, is the town's patron saint.

== Notable people ==
- Fausto Barreto - philologist, journalist, teacher and Brazilian politician
- Jovita Feitosa - Feitosa, considered to be a martyr of feminism, was born in Tauá. Though she attempted to fight in the Paraguayan War, she was denied permission to join the battlefront.
- Vicente Fialho - Minister of Mines and Energy and mayor of Fortaleza
- Joaquim Pimenta - Lawyer and Minister of Labour

== Climate ==
Climate data for Tauá (1981–2010)
Month	Jan	Feb	Mar	Apr	May	Jun	Jul	Aug	Sep	Oct	Nov	Dec	Year
Mean daily maximum °C (°F)	32.6 (90.7)	32.0 (89.6)	31.6 (88.9)	30.8 (87.4)	30.9 (87.6)	31.2 (88.2)	31.9 (89.4)	33.0 (91.4)	34.4 (93.9)	34.9 (94.8)	34.8 (94.6)	34.0 (93.2)	32.7 (90.9)
Daily mean °C (°F)	27.4 (81.3)	26.7 (80.1)	26.3 (79.3)	25.7 (78.3)	25.6 (78.1)	25.4 (77.7)	26.0 (78.8)	26.9 (80.4)	28.1 (82.6)	28.9 (84.0)	29.1 (84.4)	28.6 (83.5)	27.1 (80.8)
Mean daily minimum °C (°F)	23.0 (73.4)	22.4 (72.3)	22.1 (71.8)	21.8 (71.2)	21.2 (70.2)	20.1 (68.2)	20.2 (68.4)	21.0 (69.8)	22.2 (72.0)	22.9 (73.2)	23.3 (73.9)	23.4 (74.1)	22.0 (71.6)
Average precipitation mm (inches)	109.8 (4.32)	94.3 (3.71)	142.0 (5.59)	126.9 (5.00)	50.4 (1.98)	16.5 (0.65)	9.8 (0.39)	6.0 (0.24)	1.8 (0.07)	5.9 (0.23)	5.7 (0.22)	30.7 (1.21)	599.8 (23.61)
Average precipitation days (≥ 1.0 mm)	7	8	11	11	7	2	2	1	1	1	0	2	53
Average relative humidity (%)	62.3	67.5	72.5	75.9	71.3	60.6	51.3	44.4	42.0	43.4	44.8	49.7	57.1
Mean monthly sunshine hours	175.3	152.8	168.8	164.9	196.7	222.5	253.5	277.2	277.8	272.3	242.4	208.9	2,613.1
Source: Instituto Nacional de Meteorologia

== See also ==
- List of municipalities in Ceará
