= Fausto Barreto =

Brazilian politician

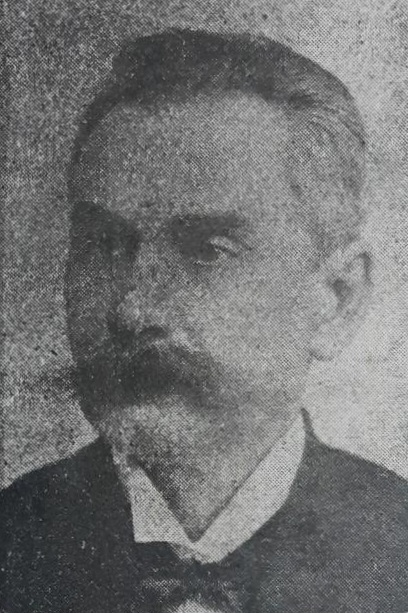
- Born: Fausto Carlos Barreto; 19 December 1852; Tauá, Ceará
- Died: 2 October 1915 (aged 62); Rio de Janeiro
- Education: Federal University of Rio de Janeiro

Fausto Carlos Barreto (19 December 1852 – 2 October 1915) was a Brazilian philologist, journalist, professor and politician.

== Life ==
Barreto was born in Tauá, Ceará on 19 December 1852. He began his studies at the Federal University of Ceará, transferring before finishing them to the Federal University of Rio de Janeiro, where he enrolled in 1874 at the School of Medicine. He left shortly before graduating. In 1883, he became a professor of Portuguese language at Colégio Pedro II.

His son, Mário Castelo Branco Barreto, was born on 17 March 1879, and also became a philologist.

He died on 2 October 1915 in Rio de Janeiro.

== Politics ==
As politician, he was president of the province of Rio Grande do Norte, from 12 July to 23 October 1889. He was also deputy general for Ceará in the last years of the Brazilian Empire.

== Linguistic work ==
His work as a philologist, mostly related to grammar, has made him one of the foremost experts in the field in his time. He was a corresponding member of the Institute of Ceará.

== Works ==
- (Ed. by Carlos de Laet) Antologia nacional ou collecção de excerptos dos principaes escriptores da lingua portugueza do 19o (20o) ao 16e seculo, Rio de Janeiro, Paulo de Azevedo, 1895 (latest 1989).
