= Júlia Bányai =

- Born: 1824; Vízakna (now Ocna Sibiului), Transylvania
- Died: November 1, 1883 (aged 58–59); Cairo, Egypt
- Other name: Gyula Sárossy
- Occupation: Freedom fighter
- Spouse(s): Gyula Sárossy, Eduard Matta

Júlia Bányai (1824 – November 1, 1883) was a female freedom fighter from Transylvania who dressed as a man (using the name Gyula Sárossy) who fought in the Hungarian Revolution of 1848 and other conflicts that followed.

== Biography ==
Bányai was born in 1824 to a poor salt miner in the town of Vízakna (now Ocna Sibiului) in Transylvania (today part of Romania) and became an equestrian in the circus. She married the lawyer and human rights activist Gyula Sárossy, but he died a few months after the wedding from an illness.

=== Military years ===
In 1848, Bányai dressed in a man's uniform and enlisted in the Hungarian forces using her late husband's papers as well as his name Gyula Sárossy. Soon she was moved to Nagyvárad (now Oradea), stationed with the 27th Battalion and was later promoted to sergeant.

With several fellow soldiers, she helped capture 12 wagons of food in Zalatna (Zlatna), that was supposed to replenish the Austrians’ food supply. For this feat she received a special commendation. Other exploits followed.

At the siege of Gyulafehérvár (Alba Iulia), with the aid of two others, she eavesdropped on and captured an imperial officer who came to spy on the Hungarian camp. There was a rescue attempt on the prisoner by the Austrians, and Júlia Bányai suffered two bayonet stab wounds in the chest during the clash. We do not know whether the doctor told superiors what he saw after extracting her from her military jacket, but in any case, she was promoted to Lieutenant for her bravery, and immediately returned to the battlefield. In another battle, a grenade splinter was lodged into her back, and so she found herself in the sick bay for months.

With her return to duty in the summer of 1849, the enemy had changed from the Austrians to the Russians. As a commander of a team she was responsible with overseeing the retreat of the Hungarian armed forces. Now known as a woman, she still engaged in combat. According to records from that time, “Lieutenant Sárossy” killed a Cossack in close combat, and detained several others." For some assignments, she dress in women’s clothing, disguised as a French dancer to spy on the Russians, for other she posed as a soap vendor to gather news behind enemy lines. Bányai obtained so much valuable information that her commanding general, Józef Bem, personally honored her and promoted to the rank of captain.

=== Turkey ===
After the defeat by Austria, she emigrated to Turkey. There she married Captain Eduard Matta in 1850 and together they traveled around the Ottoman Empire. Records show they visited Istanbul, Crimea and Cyprus. In 1851-1852, Bányai returned to Transylvania, as a woman and using another pseudonym, to participate in the uprising there against the Austro-Hungarian Empire. She distributed leaflets and proclamations, but her group was exposed by an imperial spy. Most of her compatriots were captured and many executed, but Bányai managed to escape allowing her to return safely to Turkey.

=== Egypt ===
With the collapse of their Hungarian community in Turkey, she moved with her husband to Egypt and settled in Cairo. There they opened a Hungarian restaurant and boarding house, which became a favorite of European travelers who were quizzed for fresh news of their Hungarian homeland.

In 1866, Bányai briefly returned to Hungary so her daughter could be introduced to her homeland.

Bányai died in Cairo at age 59, after which her husband permanently returned to Hungary. "The former equestrienne, who took up arms to serve her country, still rests somewhere in Egypt today."

== External sources ==
- Magyar Nagylexikon. Főszerk. Élesztős László (1-5. k.), Berényi Gábor (6. k.), Bárány Lászlóné (8-). Bp., Akadémiai Kiadó, 1993-.
