= Yona Markova =

Yona Markova (c. 1855–1923), was a Bulgarian soldier and war heroine. She became famous as a war heroine as she served as a Bulgarian soldier during the Serbo-Bulgarian War posing as a man. She was decorated with two military medals for bravery in combat.
