= Jovita Feitosa =

Military heroine (1848–1867)

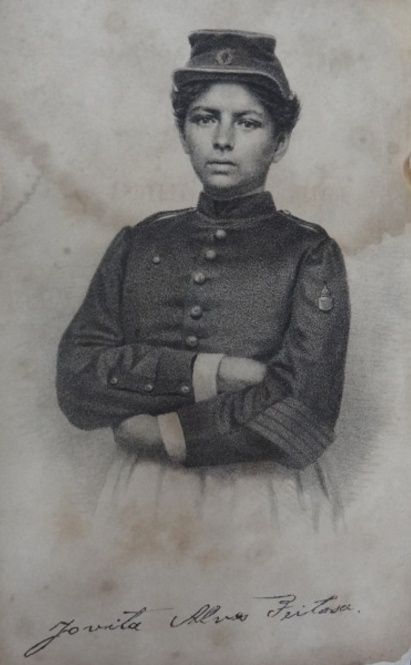
- Sgt. Jovita Feitosa
- Born: March 8, 1848; Tauá, Brazil
- Died: October 9, 1867 (aged 19); Rio de Janeiro, Brazil
- Relatives: Maximiano Bispo de Oliveira and Maria Alves Feitosa
- Military career
- Allegiance: Empire of Brazil
- Branch: Imperial Brazilian Army
- Service years: 1865
- Rank: Second Sergeant
- Unit: 2nd Grouping of Volunteers
- Conflicts: Paraguayan War

Antônia Alves "Jovita" Feitosa (March 8, 1848 in Tauá, Brazil – October 9, 1867 in Rio de Janeiro, Brazil), was a Brazilian soldier. She enlisted in the Brazilian army disguised as a man in order to fight in the Paraguayan War. Upon being discovered she was fêted as a patriotic heroine, although the authorities forbade her to participate in a combatant role. She has been interpreted as a military heroine, as a symbol for the war against sexism, as a tool of Imperial recruitment propaganda, and as an archetypal warrior-maiden.

== Biography ==
Feitosa was born in Tauá. Her parents were Maximiano Bispo de Oliveira and Maria Alves Feitosa. She was described as being of medium height and having Indian features. After the death of her mother from cholera, Feitosa moved to Jaicós with her father to live with relatives. Here, she studied music. After a disagreement with an uncle, she set aside her music aspirations and moved to Teresina.

Aged 17, she tried to become a soldier in the Paraguayan War. Disguised as a man, with a military-style haircut, her breasts wrapped up, and wearing military headgear, she walked more than 250 miles to the provincial capital to enlist. Her feminine traits and holes in her ears gave her away and she was exposed by a woman in the marketplace.

Upon being taken to the police for questioning, she sobbed uncontrollably and expressed a desire to fight in the trenches. Though an offer was made to her to become an auxiliary nurse, she declined, stating she wanted to avenge the "humiliation passed by his countrymen at the hands of heartless Paraguayans." After her case was brought to the attention of Franklin Dória, Baron of Loreto, then president (the equivalent to the current post of governor) of the Province of Piauí, she was allowed to join the National Army as a second sergeant. She received uniforms and headed to Parnaíba with the other volunteers. She set out from Teresina on a steamship which eventually carried 1302 Piauíenses who comprised the 2nd Grouping of Volunteers, under the command of Major John Fernandes de Moraes. After arriving in Recife and São Luís, she was honored for her bravery, and dined with the presidents of the provinces.

The ship arrived in Rio de Janeiro on September 9, 1865. Here, Feitosa became a notable personality. Everyone wanted to meet the woman from Piauí who wanted to go to war. In November, the Minister of War, Visconde de Cairú, issued a letter denying permission for Feitosa to join the battlefront. "Little is known of what Feitosa did for the next two years. Some say that she clandestinely made her way south to battle, though there is no hard evidence of this". Towards the end of the year, she became romantically involved with William Noot, an English engineer, and went to live with him at Praia do Russel. He abandoned her without explanation. There are alternate versions surrounding her death. One theory is that she committed suicide with a dagger in the heart in 1867, at the age of 19. Another states that she died in the Battle of Acosta Ñu in 1869.

== Interpretations ==
=== Recruitment tool ===
Jovita Feitosa turned up an opportune moment for the war effort, since recruitment was faltering. It has been argued that she was made a tool of recruitment propaganda and used to manipulate public opinion (though she herself had not intended this). Here was a country girl from a remote part of the Empire who had disguised herself as a man in order to enlist: an example to encourage timorous male volunteers and shame draft-dodgers. That was why she was fêted and accompanied by newspaper reporters everywhere she went - her tour through the northern provinces has been described as a "veritable circus" - and granted an audience by the Emperor Pedro II himself.

She began to divide public opinion, however; there were many discordant voices, and some even questioned her motives for joining, saying she did it to follow a lover. It was asked how she had been made a sergeant, quite a difficult promotion for male soldiers and one never granted to raw recruits. There was anyway a proper role for women in war but it did not include combat. The author and soldier Alfredo D'Escragnolle Taunay wrote that "she should have remembered that for a woman it is more noble to heal wounds than to open them". On 16 September 1865 the war department ruled that to allow her to be a combatant was contrary to military regulations, though it did not forbid her to go to the theatre of war in some other role, e.g. nursing, which was a longstanding Brazilian tradition. (According to historian Francisco Doratioto, she did become a nurse; some sources say she did go to Paraguay in that role, between August and December 1865.) Upon ceasing to be useful to the authorities she was allowed to drop out of the news; hence her subsequent history is obscure. Returning to her home province, she was not well received by her father. Her suicide was reported in the local newspaper on 16 November 1867. She received a pauper's funeral. Some said she returned to Rio de Janeiro, where she was abandoned by her lover, an English engineer; others, that she died in a house fire.

=== Archetype ===
The figure of Jovita can also be seen as an archetype that recurs in Western culture, namely the warrior-maiden; she has been called the Brazilian Joan of Arc.

== Legacy ==
Jovita Feitosa Square, named in her honor, is located in Fortaleza. In 2012, her biography was promoted in a TV special program by Cidade Verde as Feitosa and is considered to have paved the way for other women.
