= Battle of Nompatelize =

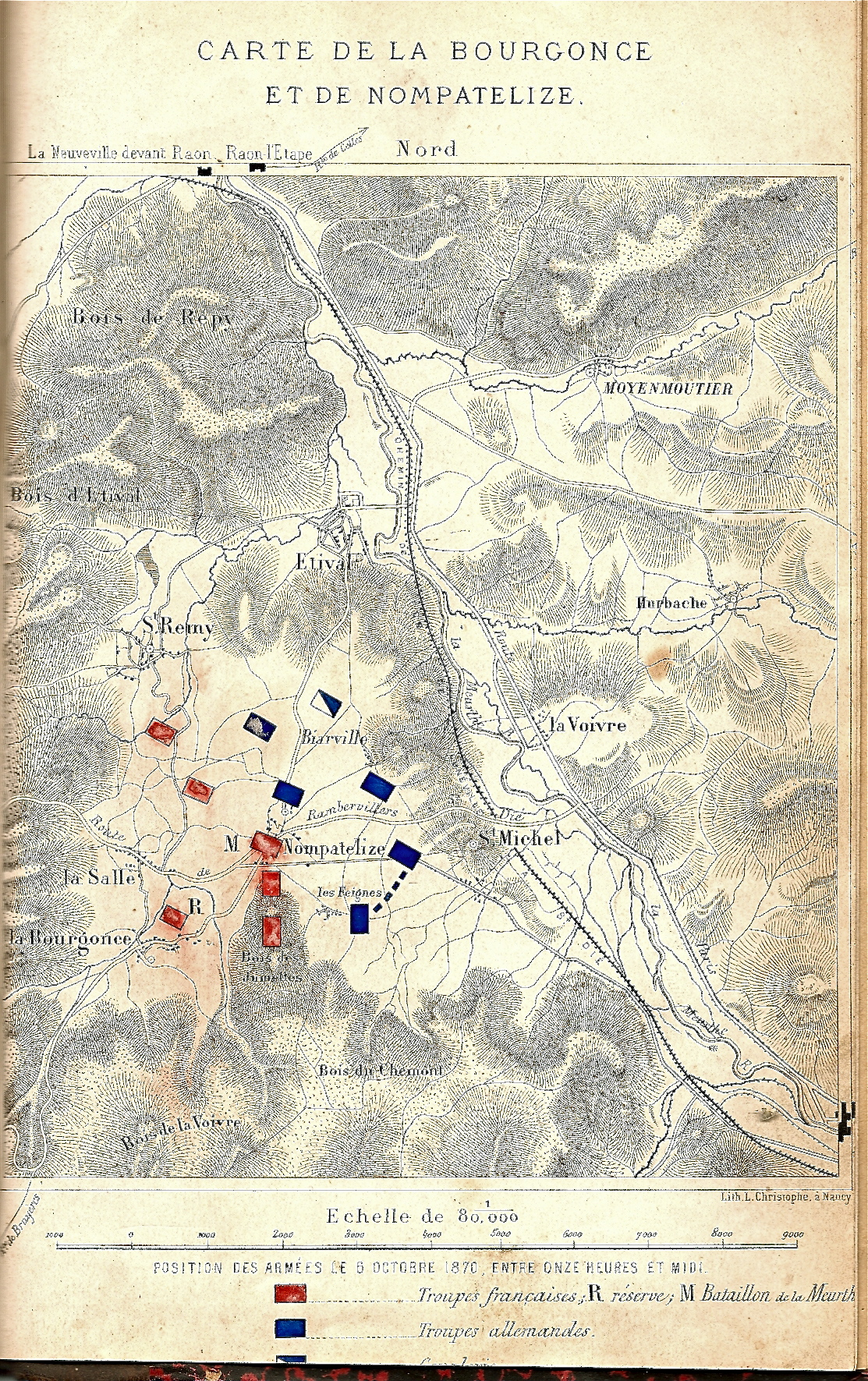
- Battle Map
Date	6 October 1870
Location	Between Étival-Clairefontaine and Nompatelize, Vosges, France
Result	German victory

Belligerents
French Republic	North German Confederation: Prussia; Baden

Commanders and leaders
Louis-François Dupré (WIA)	Alfred von Degenfeld

Strength
10,000–12,000 men	6,000–10,000 men

Casualties and losses
900 killed or wounded 600 captured	500 killed or wounded

The Battle of Nompatelize, also known as the Battle of Etival, was a battle of the Franco-Prussian War on 6 October 1870, between Etival and Nompatelize in the province of Vosges from Strasbourg 64 km southwest. This battle marked the first major crackdown of franc-tireur operations in the Vosges region by the XIV Corps of the Prussians by Minister August von Werder in early October 1870. In matches fiercely this, A force of the Army of Rhône of the French Republic under the command of General Louis-François Dupré, who predominated to markedly document in terms of troop numbers, and attacked 6 infantry battalions of the Grand Duchy of Baden under the command of General Alfred von Degenfeld which were part of the XIV Corps, but were defeated. Compared to the casualties of the German military, the losses of the French side in this battle were much greater (of which nearly 600 officers and soldiers were taken prisoner). After seven hours of fighting, the French were forced to flee in turmoil to Bruyeres and the Rambervillers. The Battle of Etival contributed to General Werder wiping out the French from Alsace.

== The Battle ==
General of the Infantry Werder along with Baron Kolmar von der Goltz of Germany, after the Battle of Strasbourg in September 1870, was marching westward. Werder's first task was to wipe out the French Franc-tireur guerrillas from the Vosges range, and on 1 October a German vertical formation – with several battalions, squads and battalions. Cavalry and battery - commanded by Major General Degenfeld began the march through the Vosges. Through the passes, German soldiers met, but only two small skirmishes took place on 4 and 5 October 1870, in which the French were all defeated. On 5 October General Degenfeld received orders from Strasbourg that his formation would be the vanguard of the newly formed XIV Army, commanded by General Werder, which had begun the march to Épinal. On 6 October Degenfeld decided to capture Saint-Dié-des-Vosges and began flooding the Meurthe River. On his left flank, however, his forces were fiercely attacked by the French from many sides, and so he had to give up his intention to capture Saint-Die to meet the enemy army. Most of the French troops participating in the battle were Garde Mobile and were part of the vanguard of the main army of the Army of the Rhine, under the command of General Dupré. According to a report to the Grand Duke of Baden after this battle, the Battle of Nompatelize lasted from 9:30 a.m. until 4 p.m. that day. Documents of Prussian Army Chief of Staff Helmuth von Moltke the Elder. It is reported that the French army was much stronger than the weak German vertical formation, although other accounts indicate that the numbers of the two sides were equal. The forces involved in the German battle consisted of the 3rd Regiment, the 1st Musket Battalion of the 1st Grenade Regiment, the Grenade Launcher Battalion of the 6th Regiment, 2 cavalry teams of the Dragon Cavalry Regiment. Guard troops, along with the Möbel and Kunz artillery batteries.

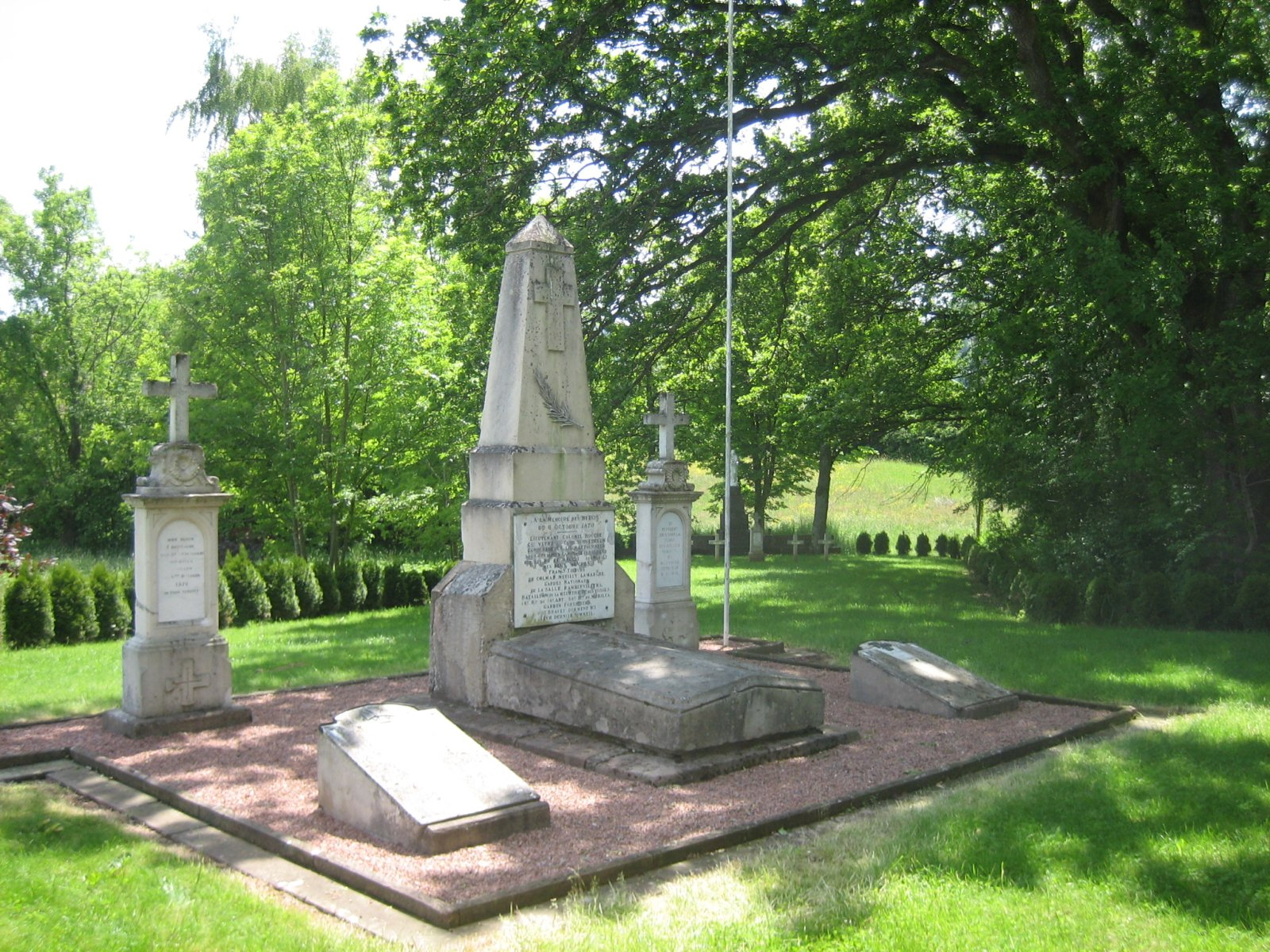
A war memorial of the Battle

The Germans attacked the enemy with bayonets, and captured the villages in French hands: St. Rémy, Nompatelize and the Bois des Jumelles. All three fierce attacks of the French army were broken by the Germans. Dupré himself was seriously wounded in the fighting, and the German artillery proved its strength. Crushed and crushed, the French army had to rush to flee. However, when night fell, Degenfeld did not pursue the pursuit because his forces were exhausted. During 7 October the German general remained stationed south of Etival, in support of the XIV Corps' vertical formations, which were advancing down the Meurthe Valley. On the same day, several forces of the Reconnaissance Corps of the French Guard also captured Saint-Die. The defeat of the Army of the Rhine under General Albert Cambriels in the Battle of Nompatelize severely damaged their morale. Within a few days, their troops reduced from 55,000 to 24,000 people, which causes mainly due to desertions. On 22 October they were again crushed by German forces at the Battle of Ognon. The victories this contributed to demonstrate the superior strength of the German reserve forces and the Landwehr system against the hastily trained fledgling armies of the French Third Republic.
