= Thorildsplan metro station =

Stockholm Metro station

Thorildsplan
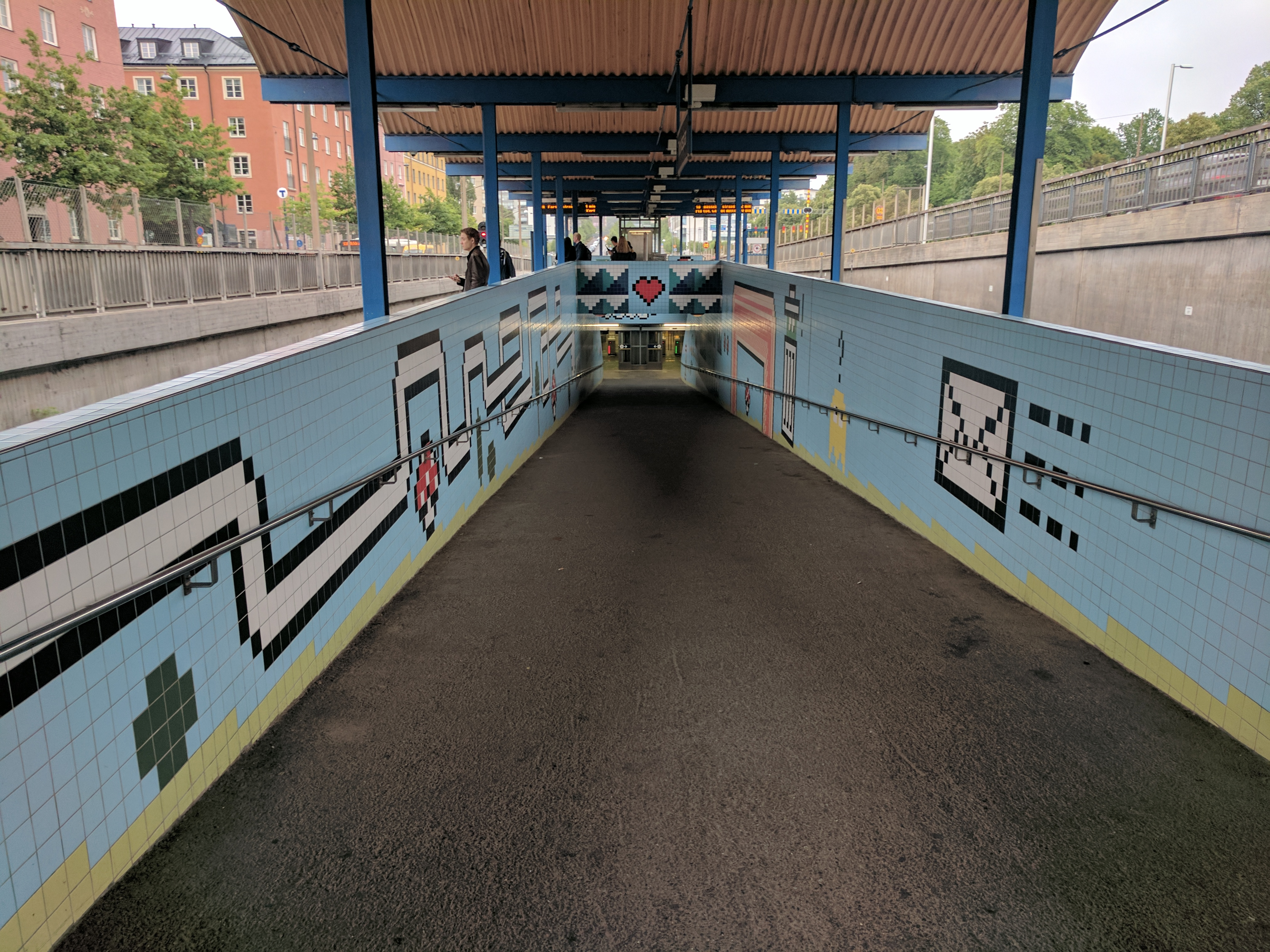
- Station platform looking east, 2017

General information
- Coordinates: 59°19′53″N 18°00′53″E
- System: Stockholm Metro station
- Owner: Storstockholms Lokaltrafik
- Platforms: 1 island platform
- Tracks: 2

Construction
- Structure type: At grade
- Accessible: Yes

Other information
- Station code: THP

History
- Opened: 26 October 1952; 73 years ago

Passengers
- 2019: 10,500 boarding per weekday

Services
Preceding station	Stockholm Metro	Following station
Kristineberg towards Åkeshov	Line 17	Fridhemsplan towards Skarpnäck
Kristineberg towards Alvik	Line 18	Fridhemsplan towards Farsta strand
Kristineberg towards Hässelby strand	Line 19	Fridhemsplan towards Hagsätra
Location
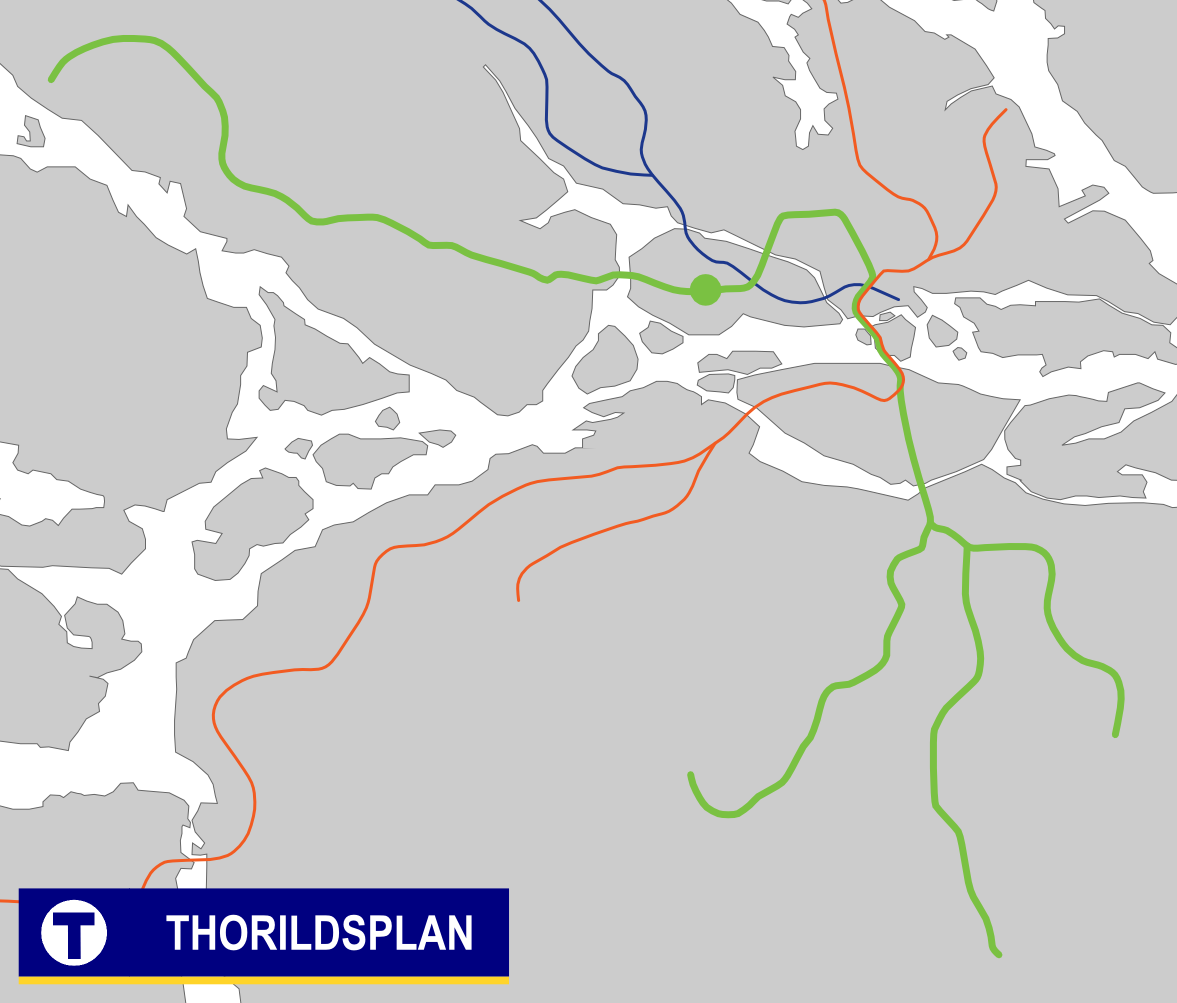

Thorildsplan metro station is a station on the Green Line of the Stockholm Metro. It takes its name from the nearby park of Thorildsplan, which in turn is named after the writer Thomas Thorild, and is in the district of Kristineberg, which is in the borough of Kungsholmen in central Stockholm. The station has a single island platform and is located in the centre of Drottningholmsvägen, with access from a pedestrian underpass at its eastern end that passes under both road and rail line. The distance to Slussen is 6.1 km (3.8 mi).

The station was inaugurated on 26 October 1952 as a part of the section of line between Hötorget and Vällingby.

As part of Art in the Stockholm Metro project, the station has two distinct art works. A relief of a sun on the track wall is by Huck Hultgren and dates from 1975. A painting of concrete surfaces on the theme of Thomas Thorild, genius, inventor, thinker is by Tobias Apelgren and Lou Åberg and dates from 1998.

== Gallery ==
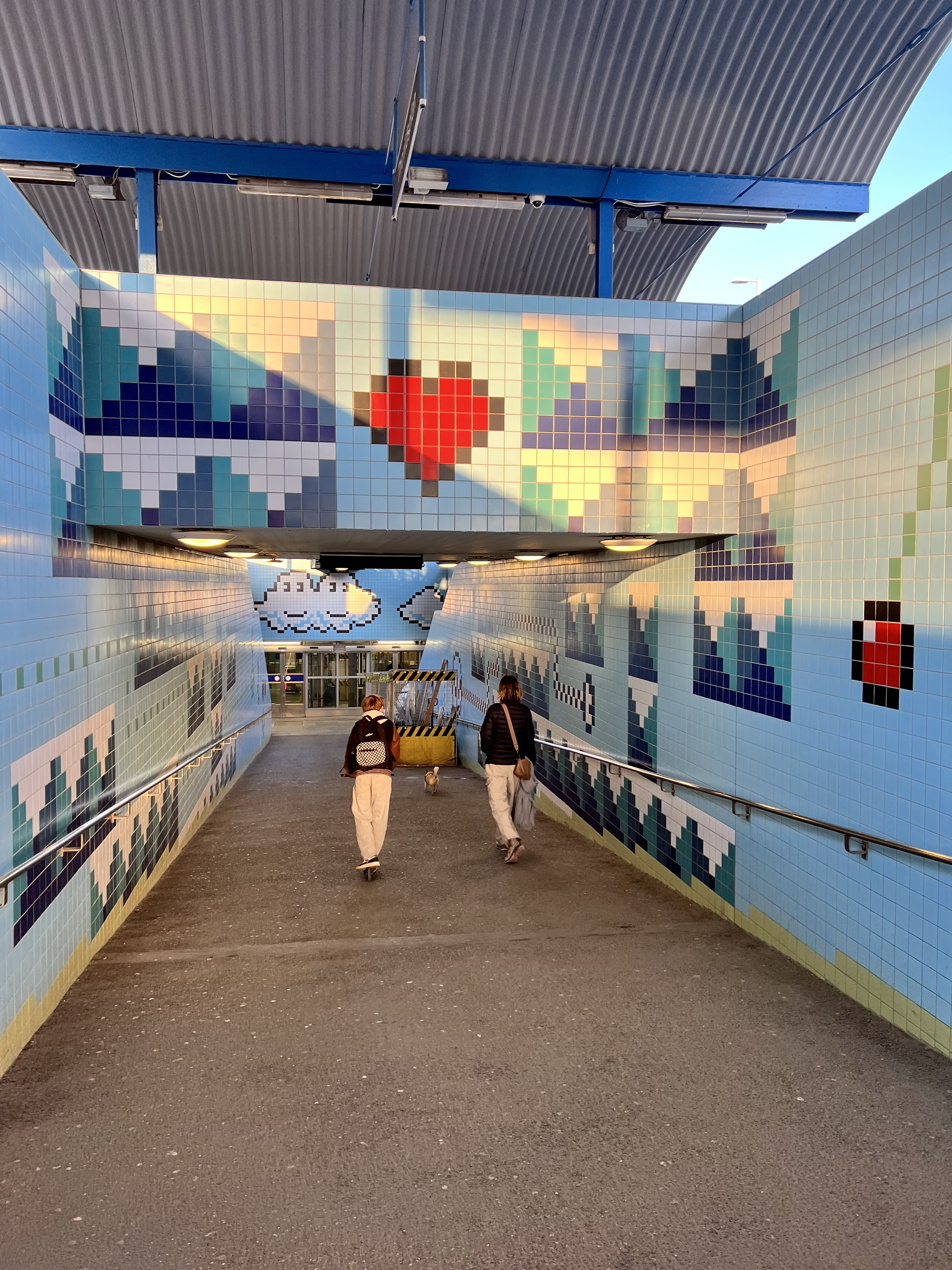
Entrance to the station, decorated to resemble a retro video game

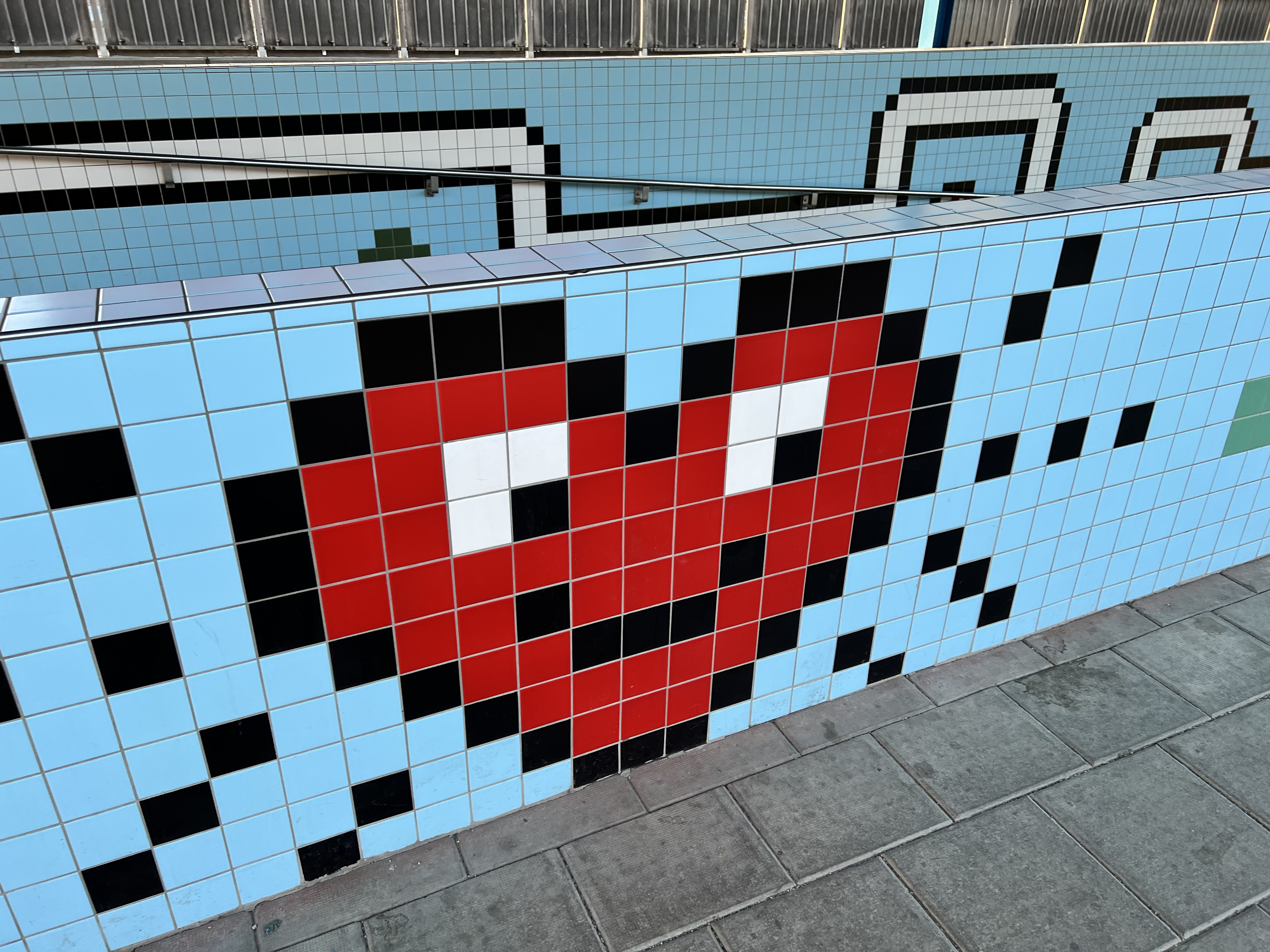
Decoration on the ramp

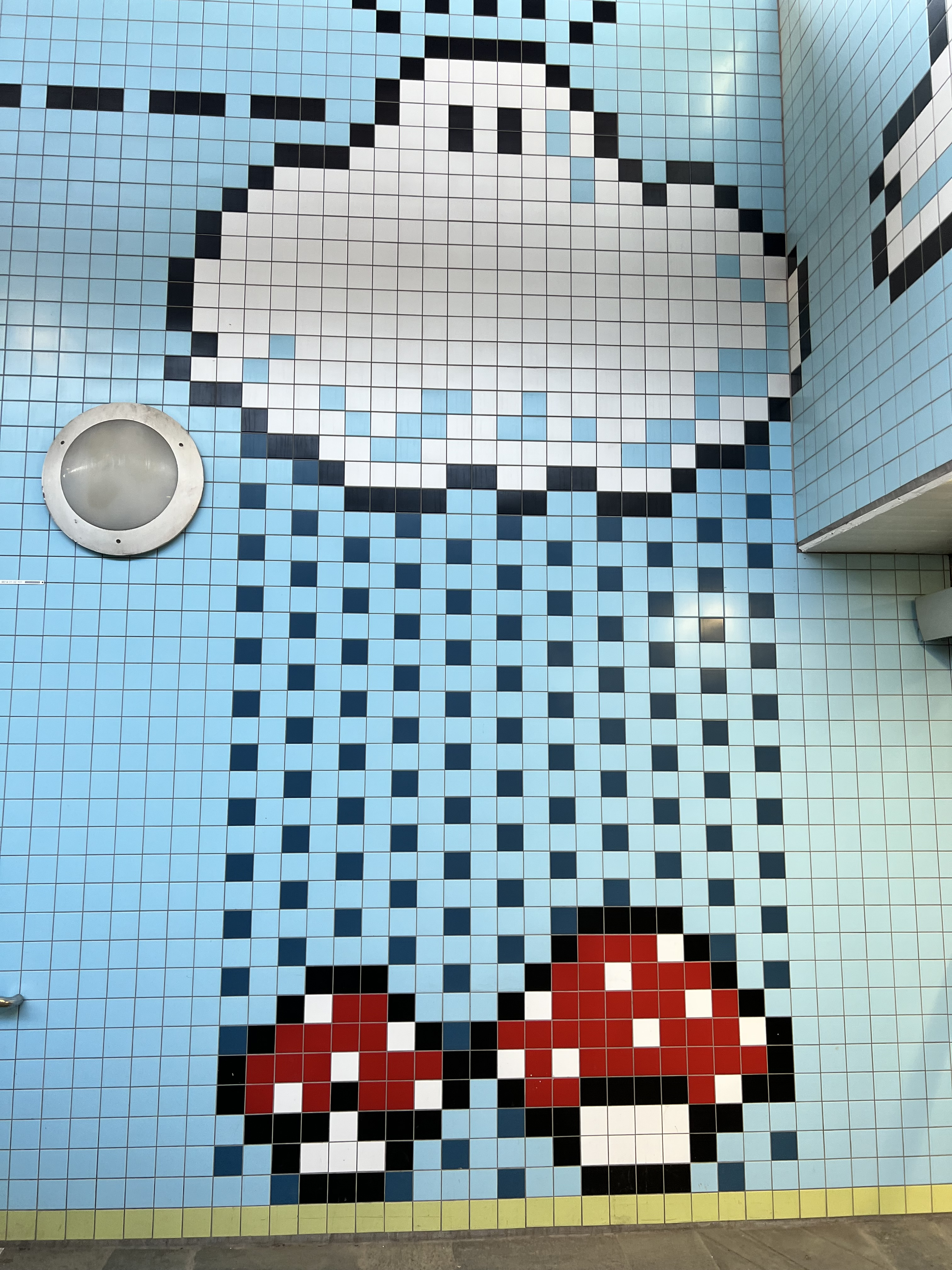
Decoration outside the station vestibule

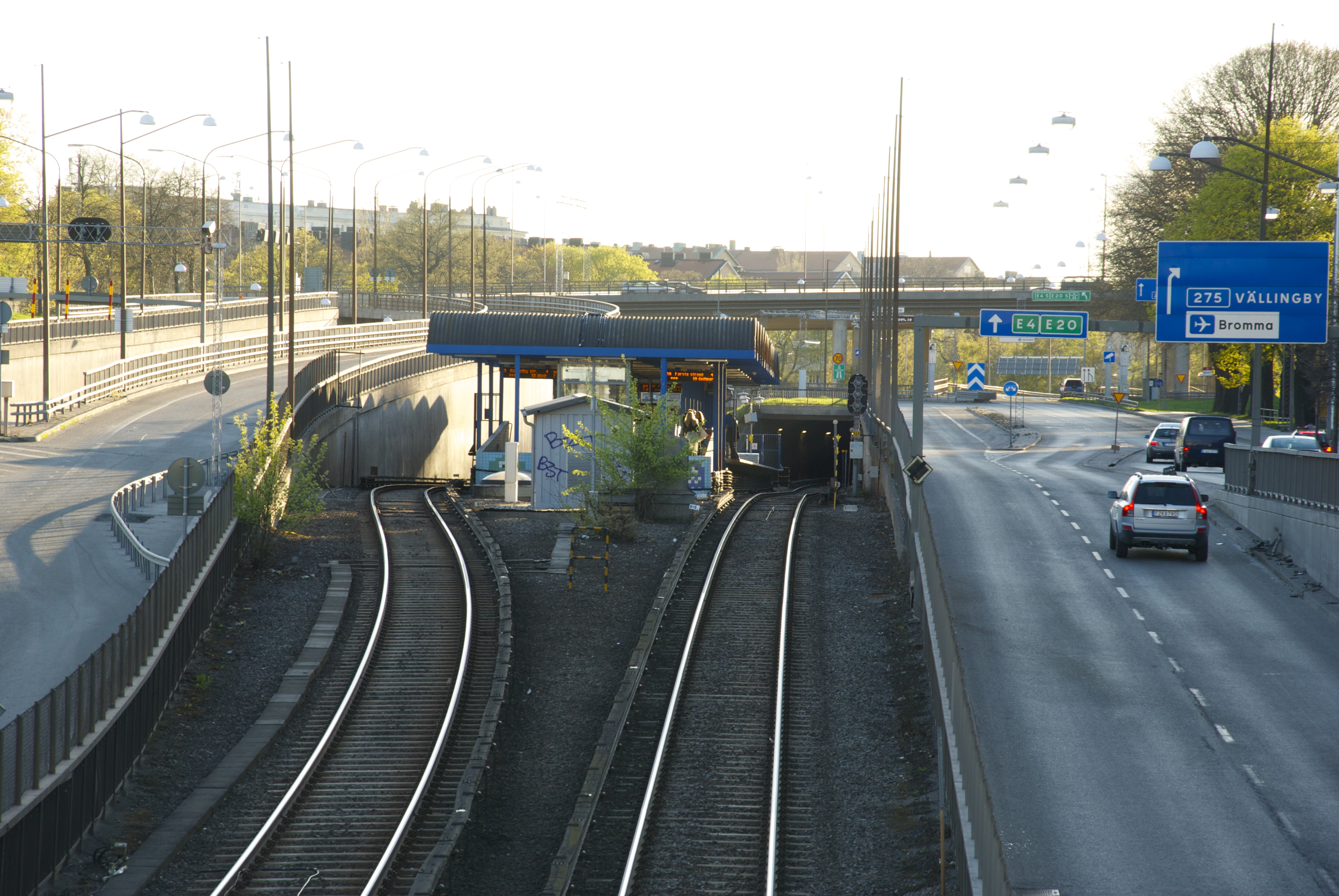
Station seen from east, 2011

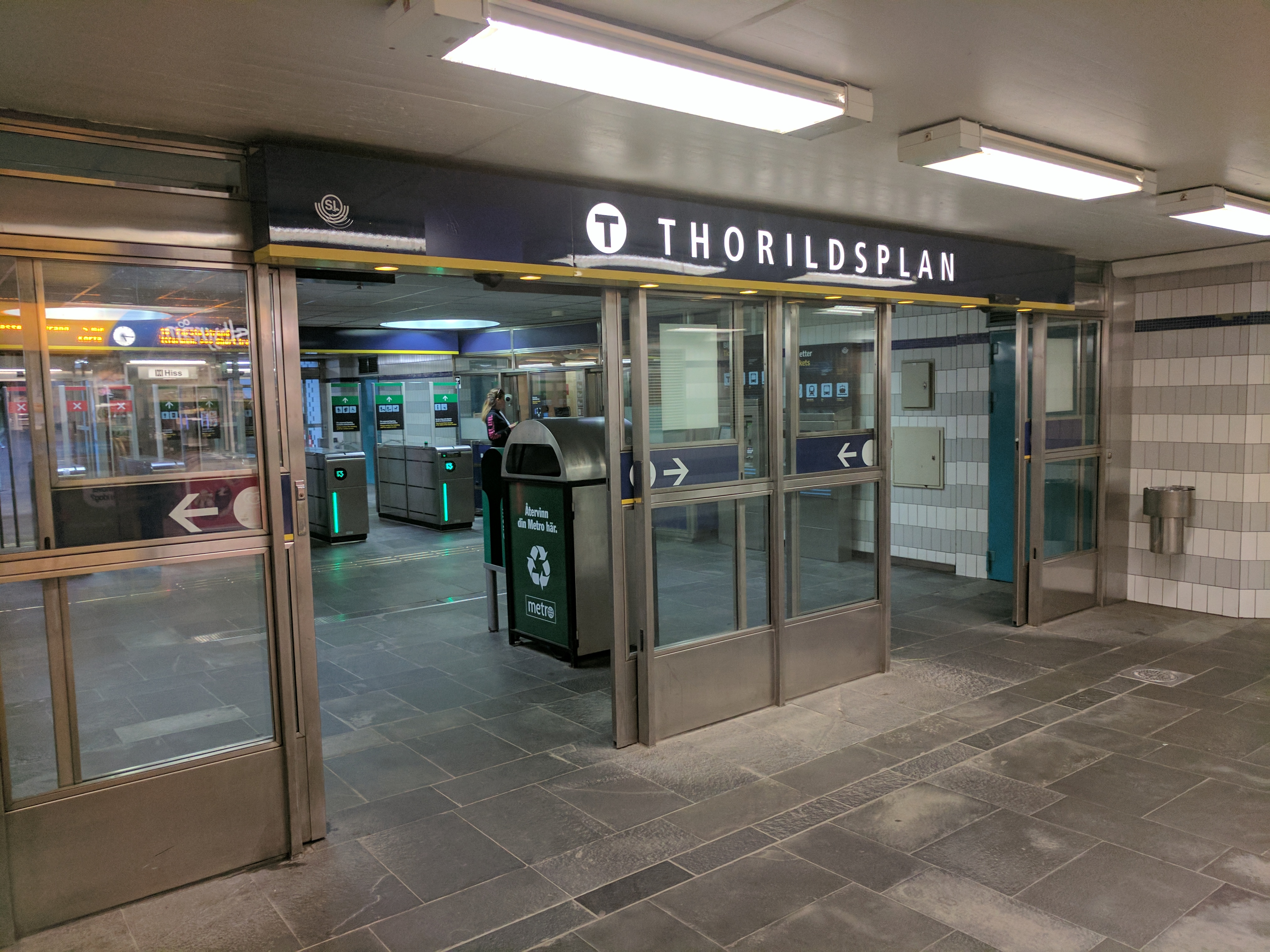
Entrance from underpass, 2017

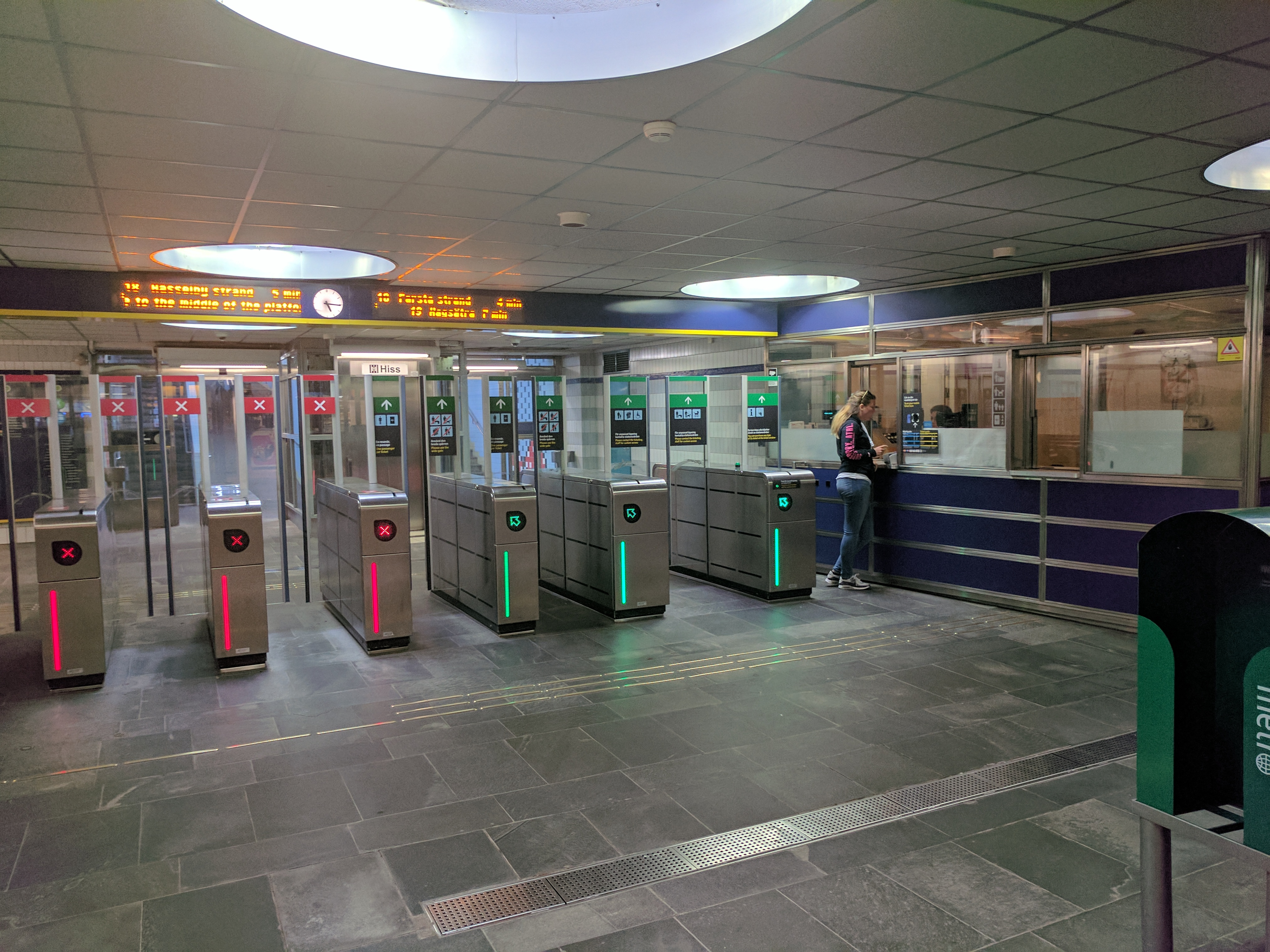
Ticket hall, 2017

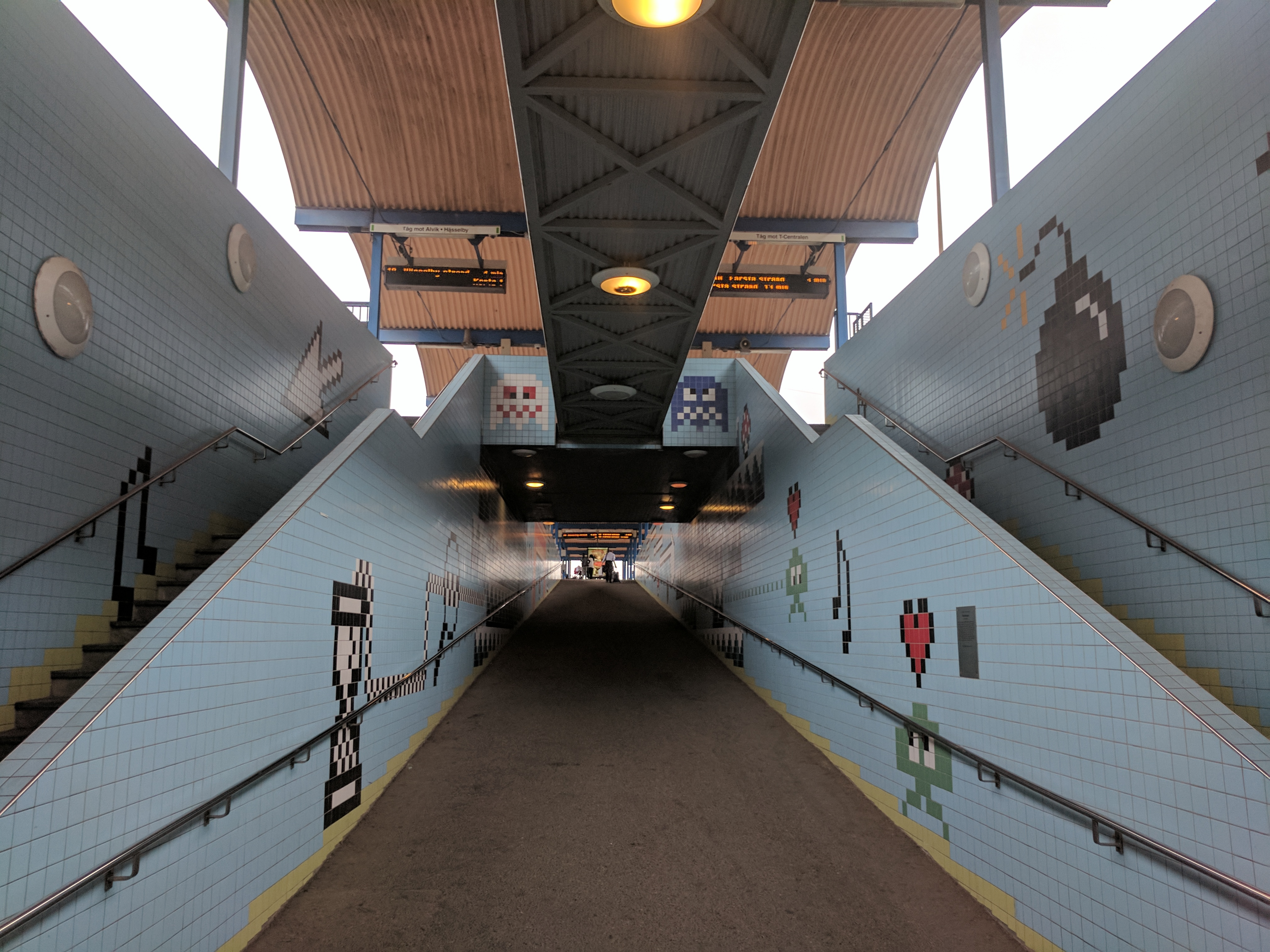
Access to platform, 2017
