= Swedish Enlightenment literature =

Literature

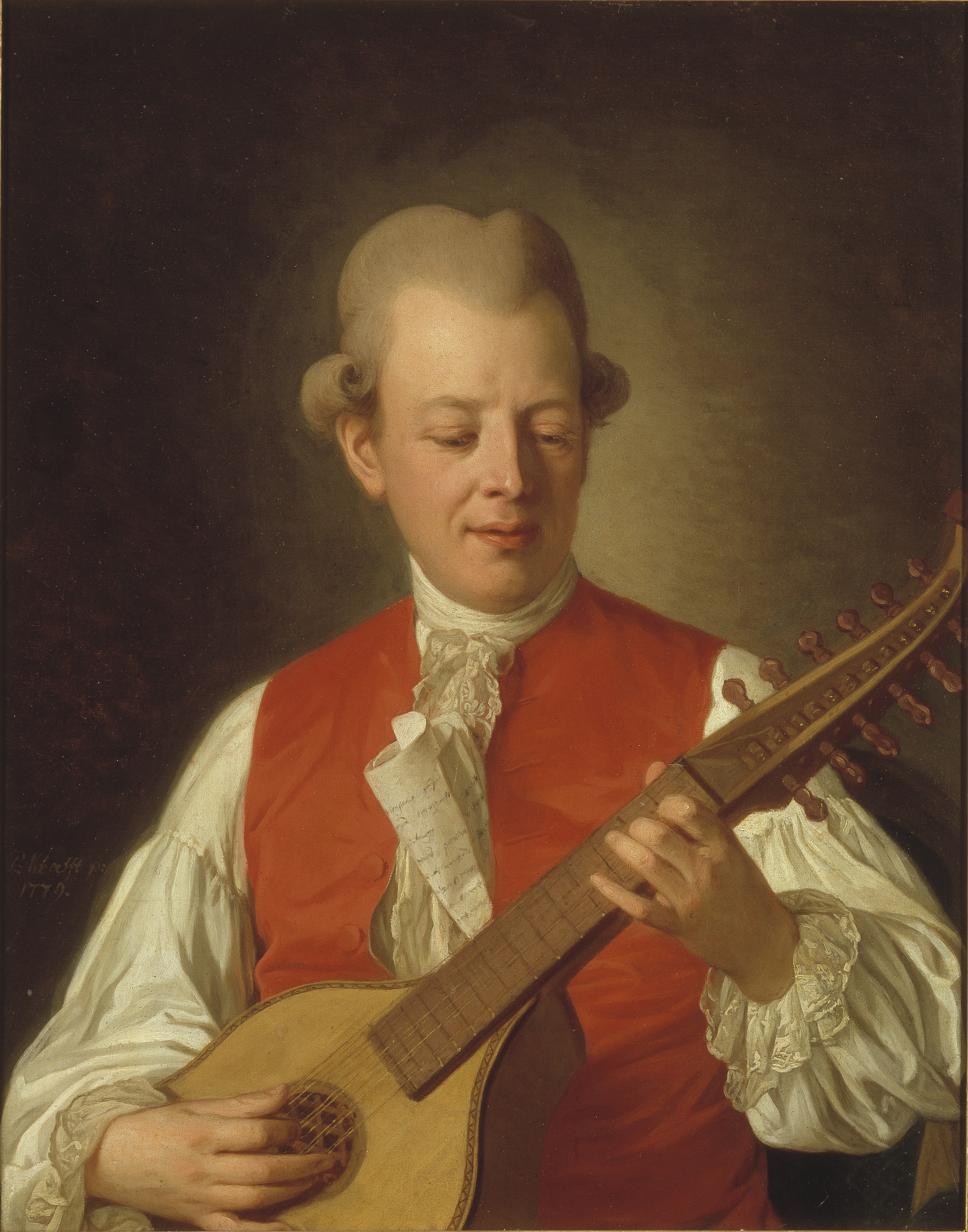
The Swedish Enlightenment songwriter Carl Michael Bellman portrayed by Per Krafft, 1779

Swedish Enlightenment literature was written between approximately 1732 and 1809. Key figures included the mystic Emanuel Swedenborg, the botanist Carl Linnaeus, the poet Johan Henrik Kellgren and the songwriter and performer Carl Michael Bellman.

== From spirituality to science and poetry ==
There were only a few notable writers in spiritual matters in the 18th century. The most notable exception is Emanuel Swedenborg (1688–1772) who published some 30 mystical works, such as Heaven and its Wonders and Hell From Things Heard and Seen (1758). Swedenborg almost exclusively wrote in Latin, but his work did have a significant influence on others for centuries to come.

In the 18th century, Latin accelerated its decline in favor of the national language. One of the first proponents of producing material for a general public was the botanist Carl Linnaeus (1700–1772). Later key figures included the poet Johan Henrik Kellgren and the songwriter and performer Carl Michael Bellman.

== Bellman ==
Carl Michael Bellman (1740–1795) is one of few Swedish 18th century characters who has never lost the appreciation of common people. He was born in Stockholm and lived there for most of his life. Education did not turn out well; instead he became interested in pleasurable activities. He made himself a reputation as a cheerful poet and singer-songwriter.

Bellman's two principal works are Fredman's Epistles ("Fredmans epistlar") in 1790 and Fredman's Songs ("Fredmans sånger") in 1791, each comprising some 80 songs. A striking theme is the freedom with which his main characters display themselves: they drink anywhere at any time, and have sex anywhere at any time. All the same, death is always lurking around the corner.

== Notes and references ==
- Algulin, Ingemar, A History of Swedish Literature, published by the Swedish Institute, 1989. ISBN 91-520-0239-X
- Tigerstedt, E.N., Svensk litteraturhistoria (Tryckindustri AB, Solna, 1971)
