= Johann Gottlieb Naumann =

German composer and conductor (1741–1801)

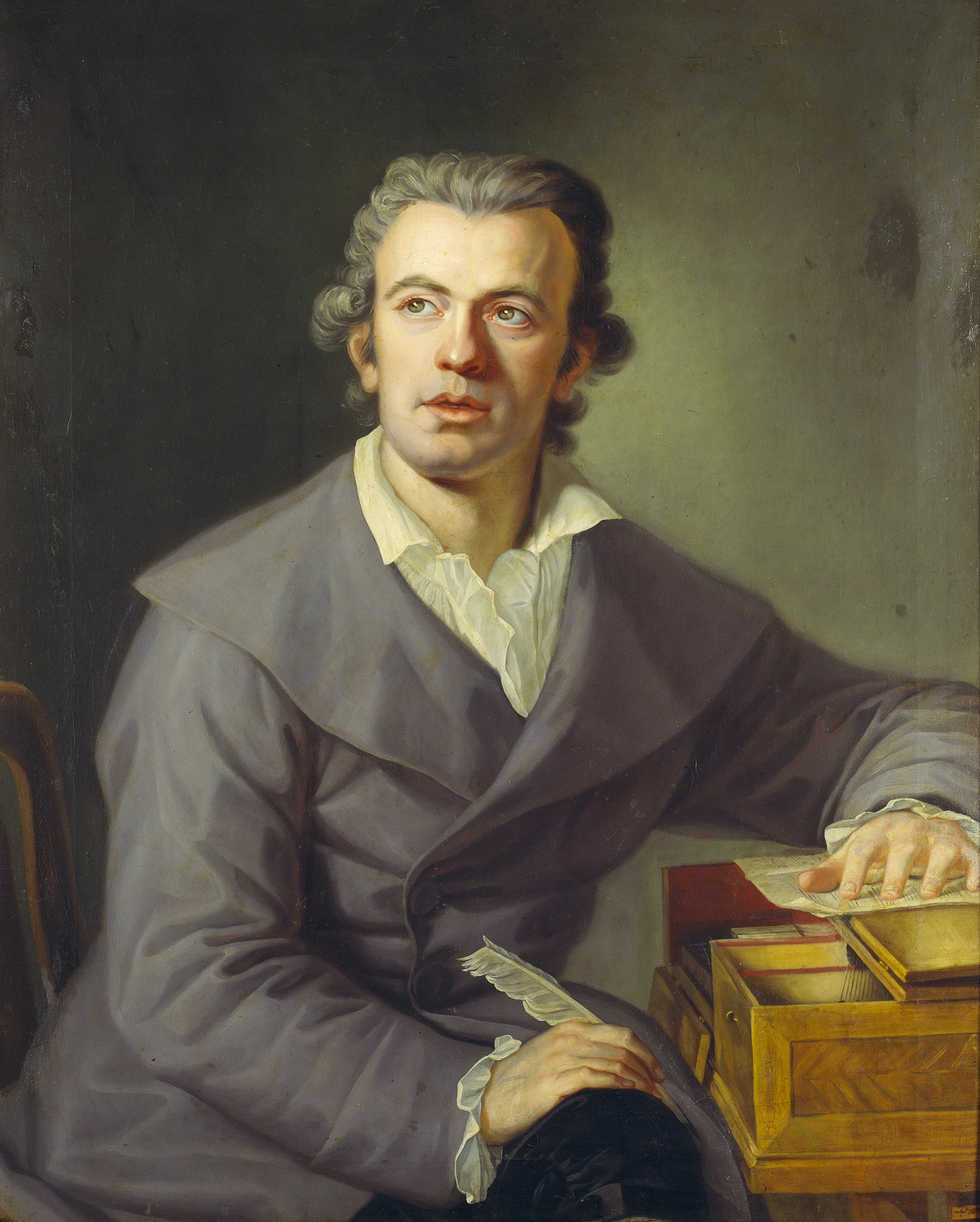
Naumann in 1780, by his brother Friedrich Gotthard Naumann

Johann Gottlieb Naumann (17 April 1741 – 23 October 1801) was a German composer, conductor, and Kapellmeister.

== Life ==
Johann Gottlieb Naumann was born in Blasewitz, Dresden and received his musical training from the teachers at his town school, where he was instructed in piano and organ. Later, he studied at the Kreuzschule in Dresden and was a member of the Dresdner Kreuzchor. In Dresden he was taught by the organist and cantor of the Kreuzschule, Gottfried August Homilius, a student of Bach. In May 1757, he traveled to Italy with the Swedish violinist Anders Wesström. The composer Giuseppe Tartini encountered Naumann in 1762 and took an interest in his work. Later that year, he made his debut as an opera composer in Venice with Il tesoro insidiato. Following his successful 1764 production of Li creduti spiriti, he was engaged as the second church composer at the Dresden court, on the composer Johann Adolf Hasse's recommendation.

The chord sequence which became known as the Dresden amen was composed by Naumann for use in the Court Church in Dresden. Such was its popularity that it spread to other churches in Saxony, both Catholic and Lutheran. It was also used by later composers, including Felix Mendelssohn (in his Reformation Symphony) and Richard Wagner (in his opera Parsifal).

In 1777, as a result of negotiations by Swedish diplomat Count Löwenhjelm, Naumann was appointed to reform the Stockholm Hovkapell and assist King Gustavus III in his opera plans. His work in Sweden led to the 1782 production of his opera Cora och Alonzo at the inauguration of the new opera house in Stockholm and the 1786 production of Gustaf Wasa, based on an idea of the king for a Royal Swedish Opera. After a brief period as a guest composer in Copenhagen (1785–86), he returned to Dresden where he became Oberkapellmeister. In 1792 he married Catarina von Grodtschilling, daughter of a Danish vice-admiral. His grandson was composer Ernst Naumann (1832–1910).

Naumann also wrote music for masonic rituals.

Naumann died in Dresden, aged 60.

== Works (selected) ==
Operas:

- Il tesoro insidiato (1762)
- Li creduti spiriti (1764, in collaboration with two other composers)
- L’Achille in Sciro (1767)
- Alessandro nelle Indie (1768)
- La clemenza di Tito (1769)
- Il villano geloso (1770)
- L’isola disabitata (1773)
- La villanella inconstante (aka Le nozze disturbate, 1774)
- Ipermestra (1774)
- L’ipocondriaco (1776)
- Amphion (opéra-ballet 1778)
- Armida (1773, in German as Armide 1780)
- Elisa (1781)
- Osiride (1781)
- Cora och Alonzo (1782)
- Tutto per amore (1785)
- Gustaf Wasa (1786)
- Orpheus og Eurydike (1786, Danish; 1787, German)
- La reggia d’Imeneo (1787)
- Medea (1788)
- Protesilao (1789)
- La dama soldato (1791)
- Amore giustificato (1792)
- Aci e Galatea (1801)

Sacred Works:

- Missa solenne in A-flat Major (1804)
- Twenty other smaller masses
- Twelve oratorios, including:
  - La Passione di Gesù Cristo (1767)
  - La morte d’Abel (1790)
  - I pellegrini al sepolcro (1798)
  - Betulia liberata (1805)
- Psalms 69, 103 & 149
- Masonic music incl. 2 marches for organ

Instrumental Works:

- Twelve symphonies (1766–77)
- Six quartets for harpsichord, flute, violin and bass (1786)
- Twelve sonatas for piano or glass harmonica (1786–92)
- Six sonatas for piano or glass harmonica, Op. 4
