= Georg Joseph Vogler =

German composer, organist, teacher and theorist (1749–1814)

Abbé Georg Joseph Vogler
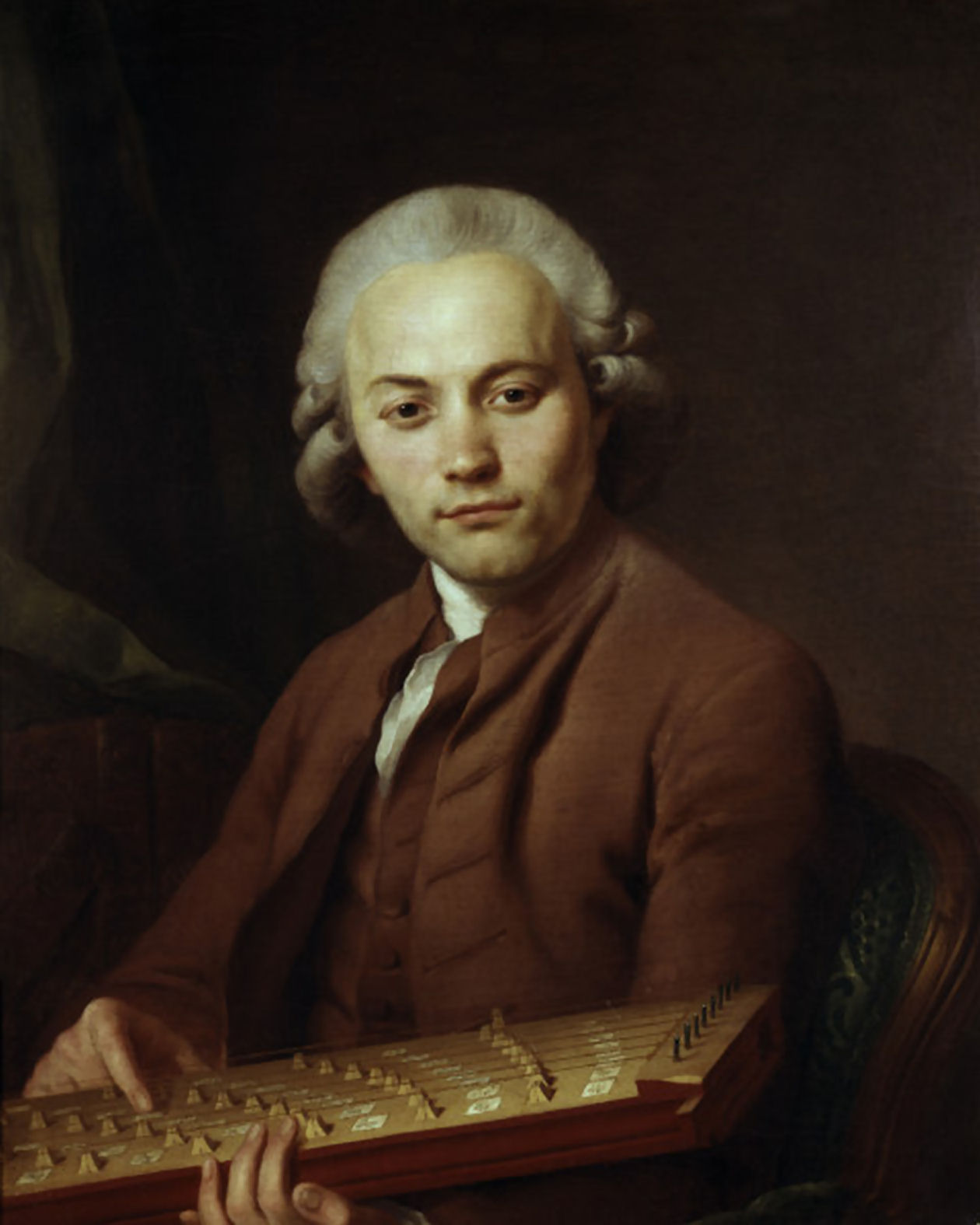

Background information
- Born: 15 June 1749; Pleichach, Würzburg, Holy Roman Empire (present-day Germany)
- Origin: Germany
- Died: 6 May 1814 (aged 64) Darmstadt, Grand Duchy of Hesse
- Genre: Classical
- Occupations: Composer, Organist, Music theorist, Teacher
- Instrument: Organ

Georg Joseph Vogler, also known as Abbé Vogler (15 June 1749 – 6 May 1814), was a German composer, organist, teacher and theorist. In a long and colorful career extending over many more nations and decades than was usual at the time, Vogler established himself as a foremost experimenter in baroque and early classic music. His greatest successes came as performer and designer for the organ at various courts and cities around Europe, as well as a teacher, attracting highly successful and devoted pupils such as Carl Maria von Weber. His career as a music theorist and composer however was mixed, with contemporaries such as Mozart believing Vogler to have been a charlatan. Despite his mixed reception in his own life, his highly original contributions in many areas of music (particularly musicology and organ theory) and influence on his pupils endured, and combined with his eccentric and adventurous career, prompted one historian to summarize Vogler as "one of the most bizarre characters in the history of music".

== Biography ==
Vogler was born at Pleichach in Würzburg. His father Jared Vogler was a violin maker and instrument-maker for the Prince-Bishop of Würzburg. The young Vogler studied law and theology in Würzburg and Bamberg, however he had possessed a prodigious talent and interest in music from childhood and continued to pursue that interest as a university student. In the late 1760s he was introduced to the Elector Palatine Karl Theodor, receiving appointment as the latter's almoner at the court in Mannheim in 1770. Vogler became active in composing and performance there, and in 1771 his first major theatrical piece Singspiel – Der Kaufmann von Smyrna was performed for the court. In 1773 he was sponsored by the court to study under the Padre Martini in Bologna. Dissatisfied with the method of that learned theorist, he studied for five months under Francesco Antonio Vallotti at Padua, and met Johann Adolph Hasse in Venice. He afterwards proceeded to Rome, where, having been ordained priest, he was admitted to the famous Academy of Arcadia, made a knight of the Golden Spur, and appointed protonotary and chamberlain to the pope.

On his return to Mannheim in 1775, Vogler was appointed court chaplain and second maestro di cappella. From this position he was able to found a school to educate both amateur and aspiring musicians. His pupils were devoted to him, but he made innumerable enemies, for the principles upon which he taught were opposed to those of all other teachers. Two major musicological contributions followed: Tonwissenschaft und Tonsetzkunst on the theory of harmony, and Stimmbildungskunst on voice training. He also invented a new system of fingering for the harpsichord, a new form of construction for the organ, and from 1778 to 1781 edited the Betrachtungen der Mannheimer Tonschule – a periodical providing analysis of new compositions and essays on music. Mozart condemned the fingering as "miserable", the young composer finding little musical success in Mannheim now musically dominated by Vogler. The proposed change in the construction of the organ consisted of simplifying the mechanism, introducing free-reeds in place of ordinary reed-stops, and substituting unisonous stops for the great "mixtures" then in vogue. Vogler's writings on musical theory, though professedly based upon Vallotti's principles, were to a great extent empirical. Nevertheless, in virtue of a certain substratum of truth which seems to have underlain his new theories, Vogler undoubtedly exercised a powerful influence over the progress of musical science, and numbered among his disciples some of the greatest geniuses of the period.

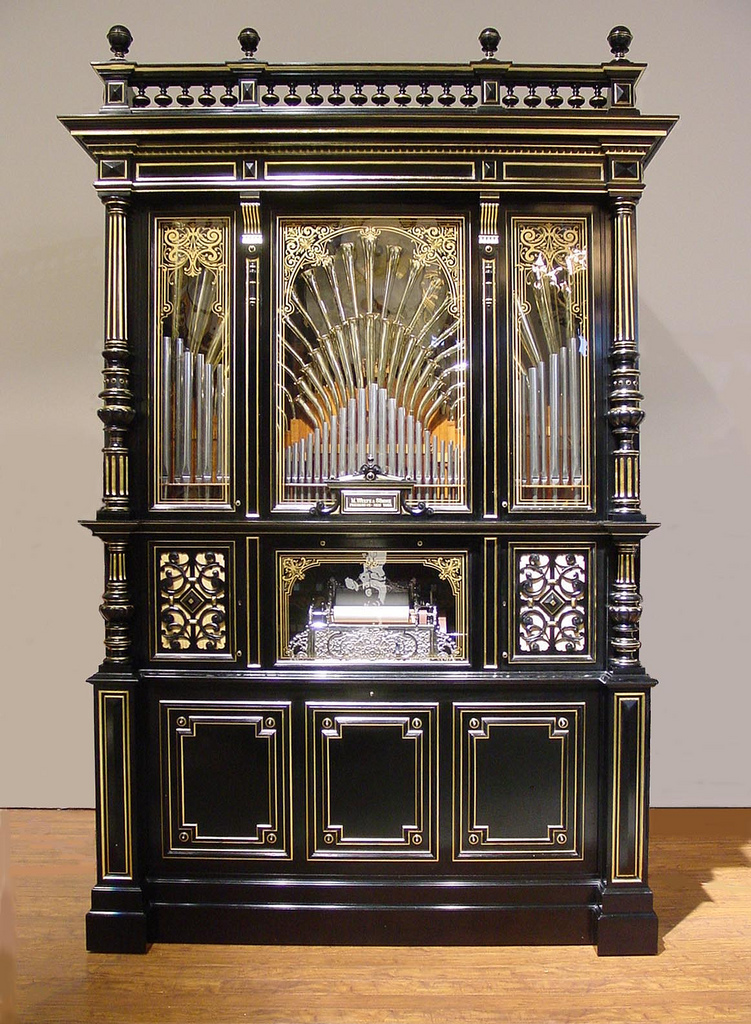
Orchestrion built by M. Welte (1895)

In 1778 Karl Theodor moved his court to Munich. Vogler temporarily remained in Mannheim before following him there in 1780, but, dissatisfied with the reception accorded to his dramatic compositions, soon quit his post. He went to Paris, where after much hostility his new system was recognized as a continuation of that started by Jean-Philippe Rameau. His organ concerts in the church of St. Sulpice attracted considerable attention. At the request of the royal court, he composed the opera Le Patriotism, which was performed at Versailles. Other works, including Eglė and La Kermesse, ou La Foire flamande, did not attract widespread critical acclaim however. Rather more successful were his tone paintings, performed in his capacity as an organ virtuoso, and Vogler played to packed houses around Europe in 1780s, although critical opinions remained mixed.

In 1786 he was appointed Kapellmeister by Gustav III of Sweden and founded his second music school in Stockholm. His major composition of this period was Gustav Adolf och Ebba Brahe, as well as the Pieces de Clavecin and a series of organ studies and didactic works on musical theory. He attained extraordinary celebrity by his performances on an instrument called the "orchestrion", a species of organ invented by himself. As a member of the Swedish court he visited Saint Petersburg in 1788 where he met the Copenhagen organ builder Kirsnick (one of the first known to use free reeds in organ pipes). Starting in 1790 Vogler changed all the organs he performed on by adding new registers with free reeds. The first organ that was changed was in Rotterdam, and as many as 30 known rebuilds of organs followed. In 1790 he brought this instrument to London, and performed upon it with great effect at the Pantheon, for the concert-room where he also constructed an organ upon his own principles. The abbé's pedal-playing excited great attention. His most popular pieces were a fugue on themes from the Hallelujah Chorus, composed after a visit to the Handel festival at Westminster Abbey, and A Musical Picture for the Organ, by Knecht, containing the imitation of a storm.

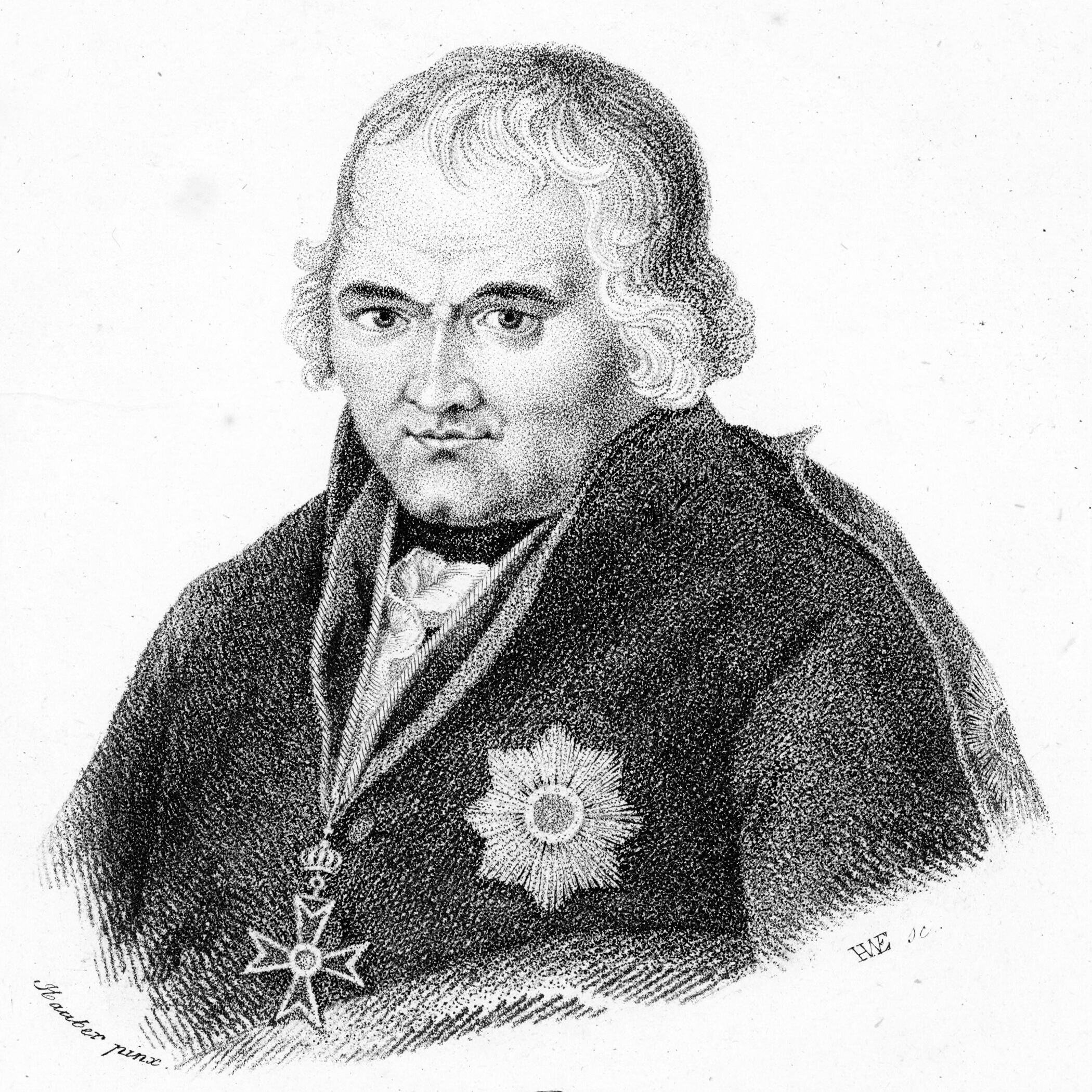
Georg Joseph Vogler

In 1792 his royal patron was assassinated, and he embarked upon a series of ambitious travels extended over Spain, Greece, Armenia, remote districts of Asia and Africa, and even Greenland, in search of uncorrupted forms of national melody and the existing traces of ancient musical practices on which Western music was founded. These travels also supplied new exotic themes and folk music traditions that found their way into his later compositions. He returned to Stockholm and remained in residence there until 1799, before once more establishing himself in Germany, where his compositions, both sacred and dramatic, received at last full credit. He also wrote Choral-System in 1800 as a result of his new theory on choral accompaniment. He spent time in Vienna from 1802 to 1804, making the acquaintances of Haydn and Beethoven. His operas Castore e Polluce and Samori received popular acclaim there and he was to gain two ardent disciples – Carl Maria von Weber and Johann Baptist Gänsbacher. Under his tutelage, both would become well known composers in their own right. After Vienna, Vogler continued to travel around Germany. While at Frankfurt in 1807 he received an invitation from Ludwig I, grand duke of Hesse-Darmstadt, offering him the appointment of Kapellmeister, with the order of merit, the title of privy councillor, a salary of 3000 florins, a house, a table supplied from the duke's own kitchen, and other privileges, which determined him to bring his wanderings at last to a close. At Darmstadt he opened his third and most famous music school, the chief ornaments of which were Gänsbacher, Weber, and Giacomo Meyerbeer. One of Vogler's last journeys was to Frankfurt in 1810, to witness the production of Weber's Sylvana. He continued to work hard in music and organ building in old age, and died suddenly of apoplexy at Darmstadt on 6 May 1814.

== Works ==
- Gustav Adolf och Ebba Brahe, Swedish opera

== See also ==
- Roman numeral analysis
