= Bergtheim (Verwaltungsgemeinschaft) =

- Verwaltungsgemeinschaft
- Location of Bergtheim within Würzburg district
- Interactive map of Bergtheim
- Location within Germany Location within Bavaria
- Coordinates: 49°54′N 10°04′E
- Country: Germany
- State: Bavaria
- Admin. region: Lower Franconia
- District: Würzburg
- Seat: Bergtheim
- Subdivisions: 2 municipalities

Area
  - Total: 35.13 km^{2} (13.56 sq mi)

Population (2025-12-31)
  - Total: 4,842
  - Density: 137.8/km^{2} (357.0/sq mi)
- Time zone: UTC+01:00 (CET)
  - Summer (DST): UTC+02:00 (CEST)
- Website: vgem-bergtheim.de

Bergtheim is a Verwaltungsgemeinschaft (municipal association) in the district of Würzburg in Bavaria, Germany. Its seat is in Bergtheim.

It consists of the following municipalities:

1. Bergtheim
2. Oberpleichfeld
