= Symphony No. 3 (Scriabin) =

Symphony by Alexander Scriabin

Alexander Scriabin's Symphony No. 3 in C minor (Op. 43), entitled Le Divin Poème (The Divine Poem), was written between 1902 and 1904 and published in 1905. It was premiered in Paris on 29 May of that year.

== Structure ==
The symphony consists of four sections, proceeding without pause:

1. Introduction
  In the Introduction (tempo marking: Lento), the main theme appears in the bass trombone, tuba, and low strings answered by the trumpets and taken up in the first violins and woodwinds.
2. Luttes ("Struggles")
  The first movement begins with the main theme in the violins and is taken up in the basses and gradually works up to a climax. As it dies away a hymn-like theme appears in the muted strings. The second melody follows in the woodwinds with violins and bass accompaniment, this in turn followed by a theme reminiscent of the "Dresden amen" in a long tremolo, the trumpets giving out their original theme, to full accompaniment. After recapitulation the main theme appears in the horns, the violins in agitated accompaniment. The close of the section is vehement, gradually dying away and leading to the second movement without halt.
3. Voluptés ("Delights")
  A slow, tender melody appears in the woodwinds and horns and later in the strings, the trumpets repeating their call in the first movement. This melody, growing more and more passionate, is broken by a strong passage in the horns which finally give out in unison a joyous measure, the basses sounding the trumpet call inverted, leading to the Finale.
4. Jeu divin ("Divine Play")
  Over a lively movement in the strings, the trumpets sound a variation of their call. A second melody follows in the oboes and cellos against the harmony of woodwinds and horns, which is suddenly interrupted by the return of the first melody. After development the episode of the unison horns and inverted trumpet call returns. Toward the close there is a return of the main theme of the first movement and the section ends with the legend and the call in unison.

== Instrumentation ==
- Woodwinds: Piccolo, 3 Flutes, 3 Oboes, English horn, 3 Clarinets (in B-flat), Bass Clarinet (in B-flat), 3 Bassoons, Contrabassoon
- Brass: 8 Horns (in F), 5 Trumpets (in B-flat), 3 Trombones, Tuba
- Percussion: Timpani, Tam-Tam, Glockenspiel
- Strings: 16 First and 16 Second Violins, 12 Violas, 12 Violoncellos, 8 Double Basses (numbers stipulated by Scriabin in the score), 2 Harps

== Performance on the piano ==
Leonid Sabaneyev mentions that this symphony is much clearer when performed on the piano. He cites a pupil of Sergei Taneyev with the words:

One has to hear how Alexander Nikolayevich [Scriabin] himself plays this symphony on the piano, he made of it a kind of Poème for piano. The impression is unforgettable, and it sounds much better than with an orchestra.

This symphony has also been transcribed for piano duet by Leon Conus in 1905.

Le Divin Poème was premiered by Arthur Nikisch in Paris on 29 May 1905 at Le Théâtre Châtelet.

The American premiere was given by Leopold Stokowski and the Philadelphia Orchestra on 19 November 1915 in the Academy of Music, Philadelphia.
