= Pleichach =

River in Germany

- The Pleichach at Würzburg Hauptbahnhof

Location
- Country: Germany
- State: Bavaria

Physical characteristics
- Mouth
  - location: Main
  - coordinates: 49.7993°N 9.9232°E
- Length: 33.8 km (21.0 mi)
- Basin size: 128 km^{2} (49 sq mi)

Basin features
- Progression: Main→ Rhine→ North Sea

The Pleichach is a river in Lower Franconia, Bavaria, Germany. Its source is near the village Hausen bei Würzburg. It passes through Oberpleichfeld, Unterpleichfeld, Rimpar and the city of Würzburg. It flows into the Main at the northern edge of the city centre of Würzburg.

== See also ==
- List of rivers of Bavaria
