= Gustaf Adolf och Ebba Brahe =

Gustaf Adolf och Ebba Brahe is a 1788 Swedish-language opera by Abbé Georg Joseph Vogler. to a libretto by Johan Henric Kellgren.

== Recordings ==
- Gustaf Adolf och Ebba Brahe. Margareta Hallin, Laila Andersson, Gunilla Slättegård, Gunnar Lundberg, Margareta Bergström, Arne Tyrén, Kåge Jehrlander, Björn Asker, Tord Slättegård, Jonny Blanc, Hans Johansson, Dorrit Kleimert, Busk Margit Jonsson. Royal Swedish Orchestra, Royal Swedish Chorus, conducted Charles Farncombe Recorded at Drottningholm Palace Theatre, Stockholm, June 7th, 1973. New York: MRF Records, 1979.
