= Kristineberg metro station =

Stockholm Metro station

Kristineberg
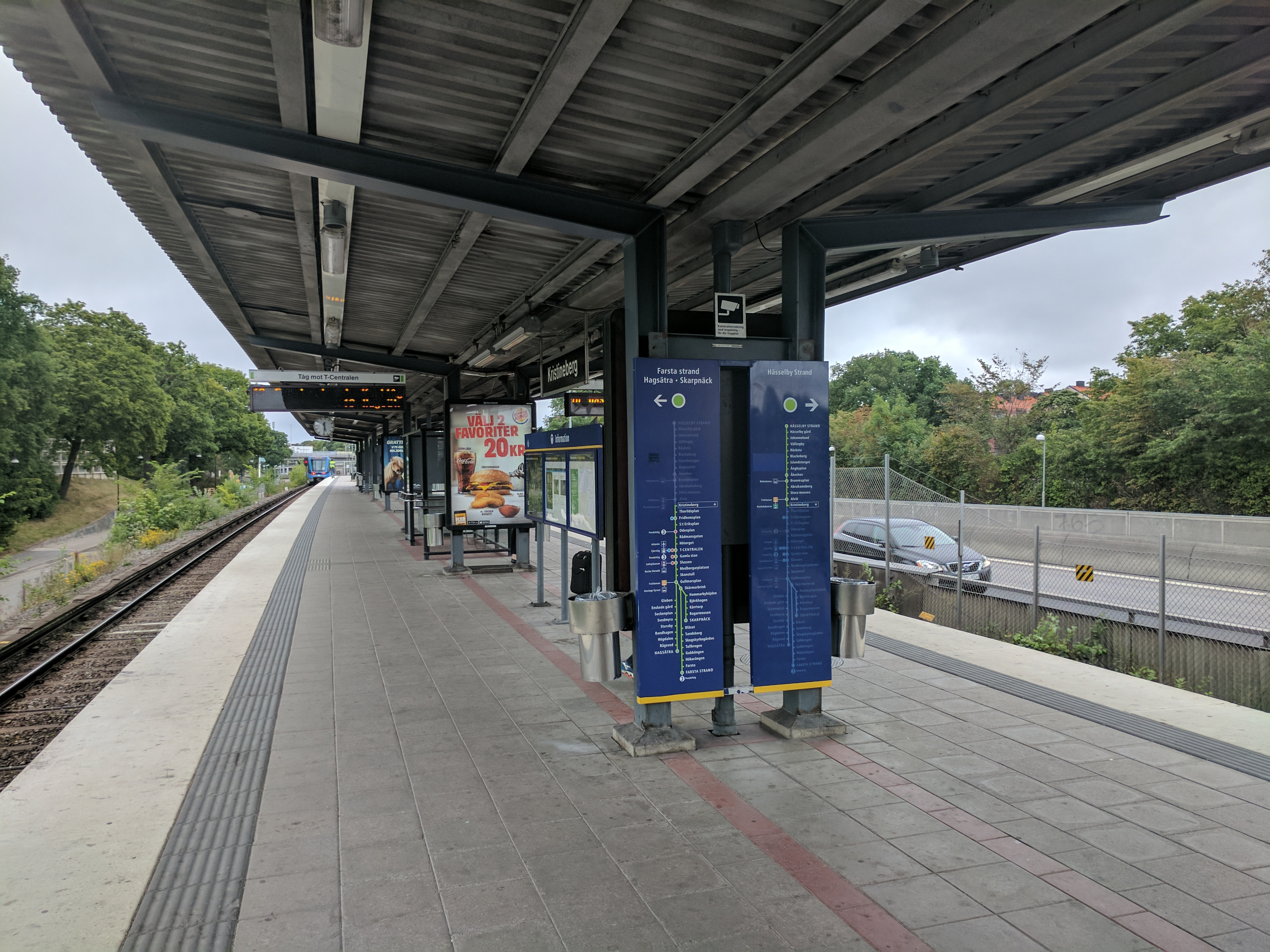
- Station platform, 2017

General information
- Coordinates: 59°19′57″N 18°0′15″E
- System: Stockholm Metro station
- Owner: Storstockholms Lokaltrafik
- Platforms: 1 island platform
- Tracks: 2

Construction
- Structure type: Elevated
- Accessible: Yes

Other information
- Station code: KRB

History
- Opened: 26 October 1952; 73 years ago

Passengers
- 2019: 6,250 boarding per weekday

Services
Preceding station	Stockholm Metro	Following station
Alvik towards Åkeshov	Line 17	Thorildsplan towards Skarpnäck
Alvik Terminus	Line 18	Thorildsplan towards Farsta strand
Alvik towards Hässelby strand	Line 19	Thorildsplan towards Hagsätra
Location
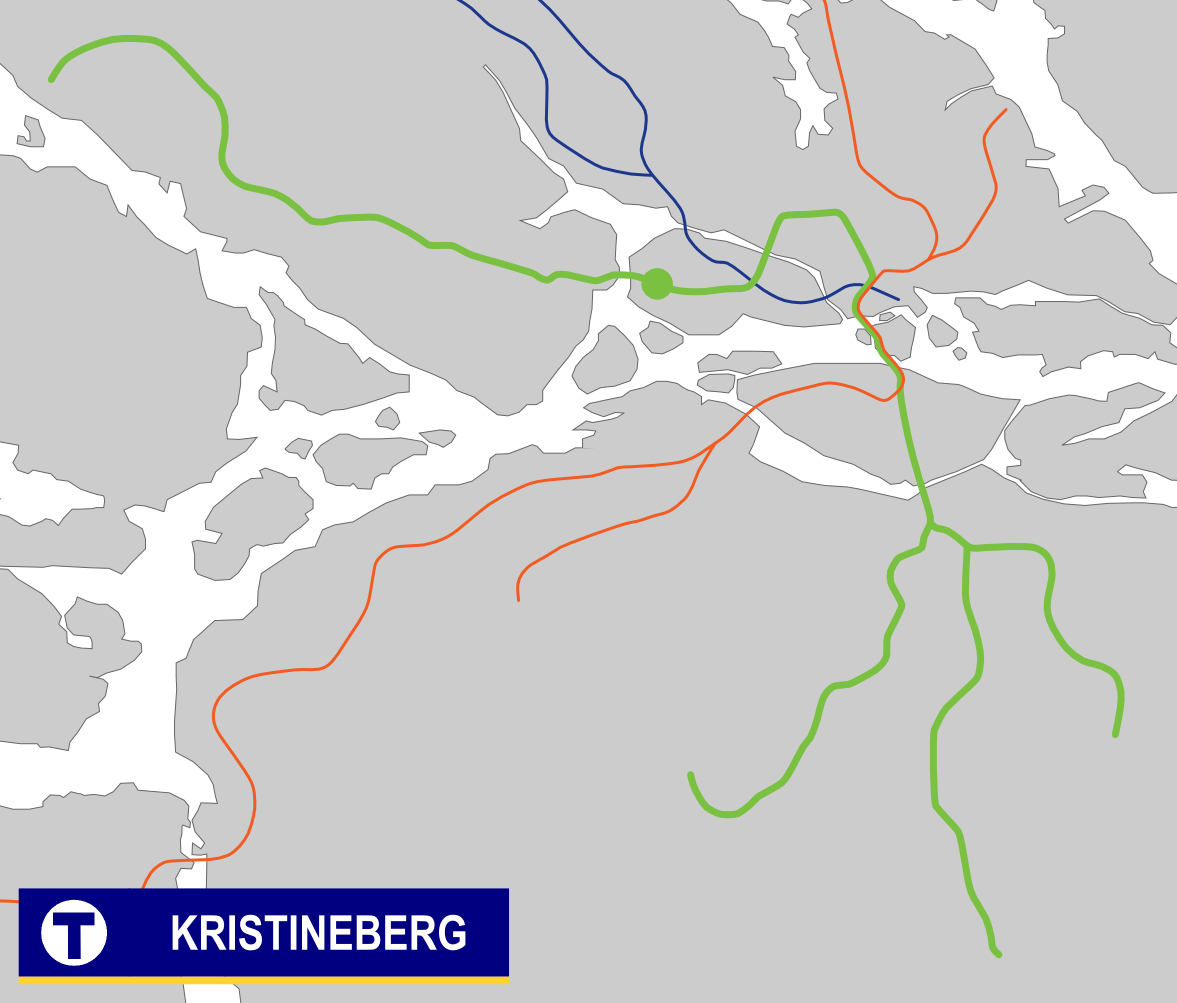

Kristineberg metro station is a station on the Green Line of the Stockholm Metro. It is located in the district of Kristineberg, which is in the borough of Kungsholmen in central Stockholm. The station is located above ground alongside Drottningholmsvägen on its approach to the eastern end of the Tranebergsbron bridge. It has a single island platform, with access from Nordenflychtsvägen, which passes under the station and bridge approach. The distance to Slussen is 6.7 km (4.2 mi).

The station was inaugurated on 26 October 1952 as a part of the section of line between Hötorget and Vällingby.

As part of Art in the Stockholm Metro project, a group of bronze sculptures by Carina Wallert, entitled Traveller with animal, was installed on the station platform in 1991.

== Gallery ==
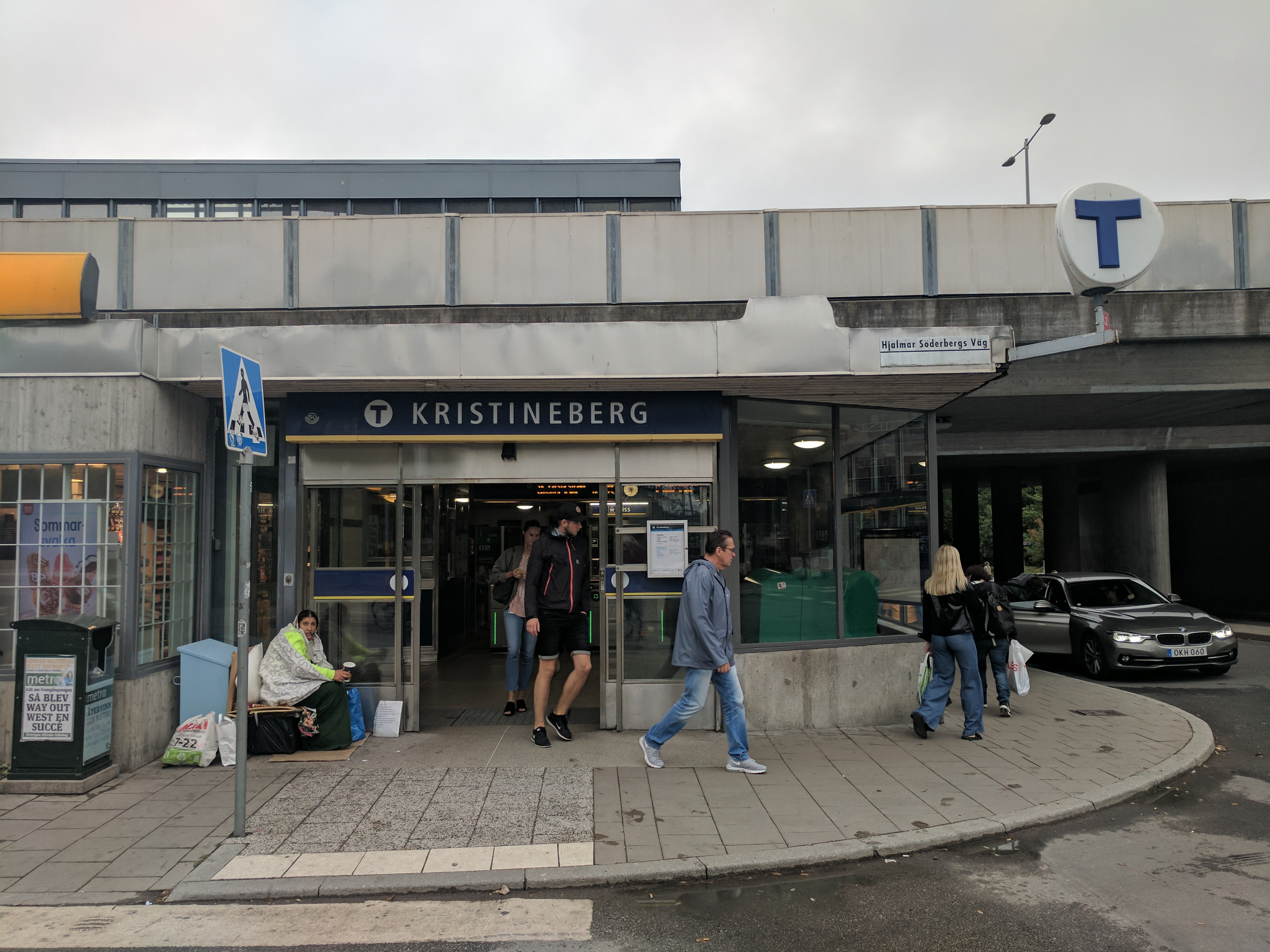
Entrance to the station, 2017

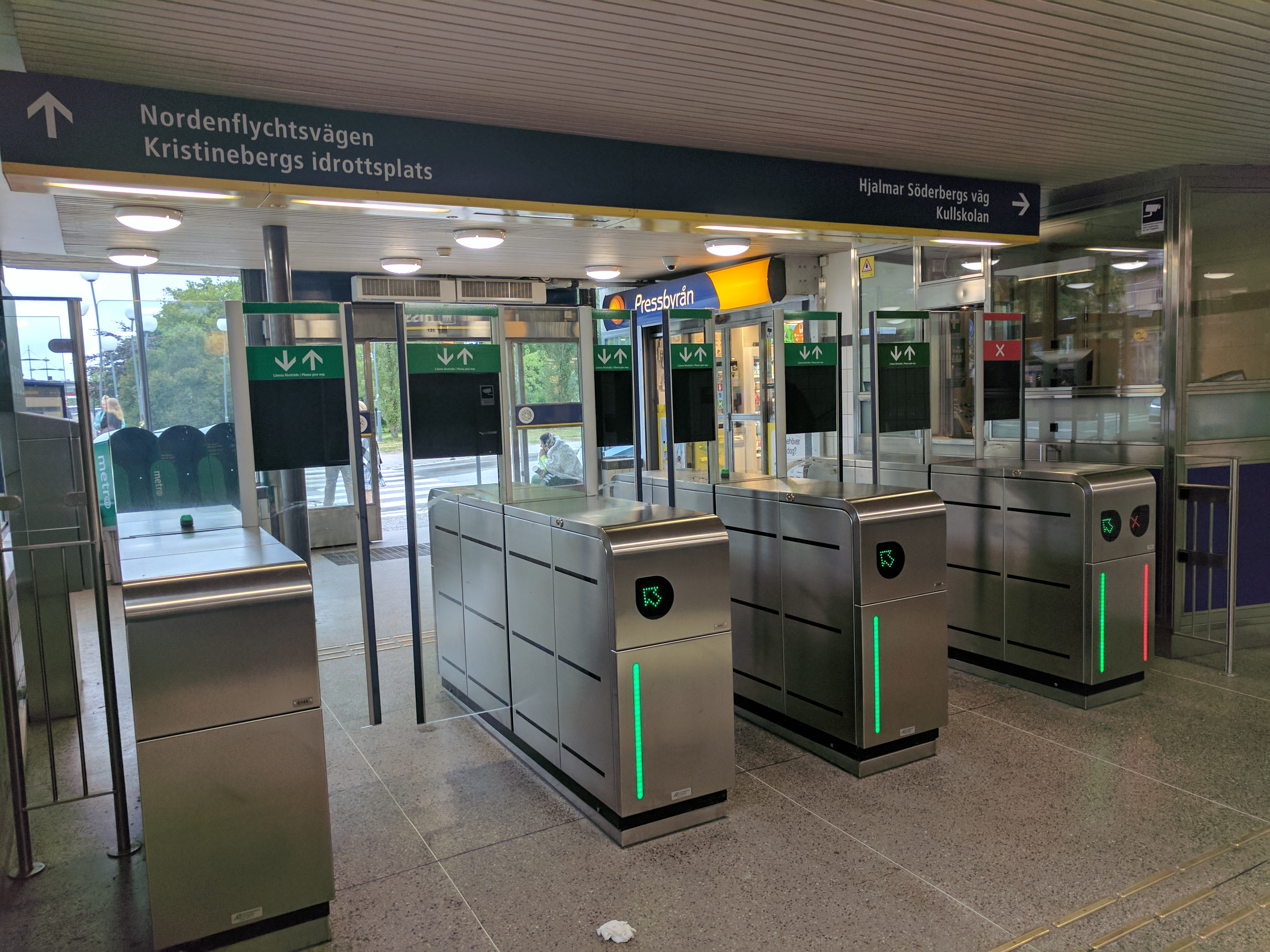
Inside the station, 2017

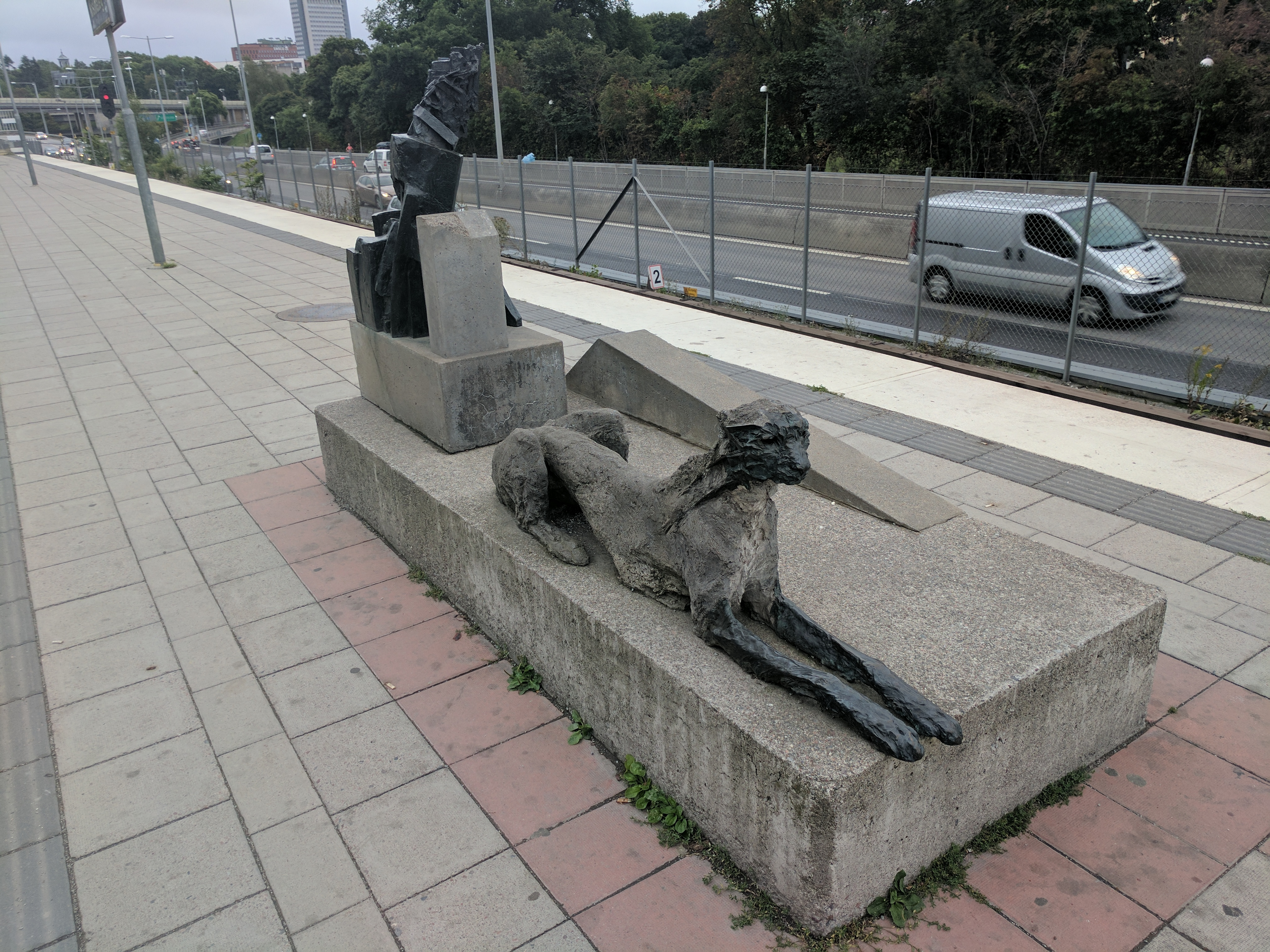
Traveller with animal, 2017
