= Dresden amen =

Musical motif

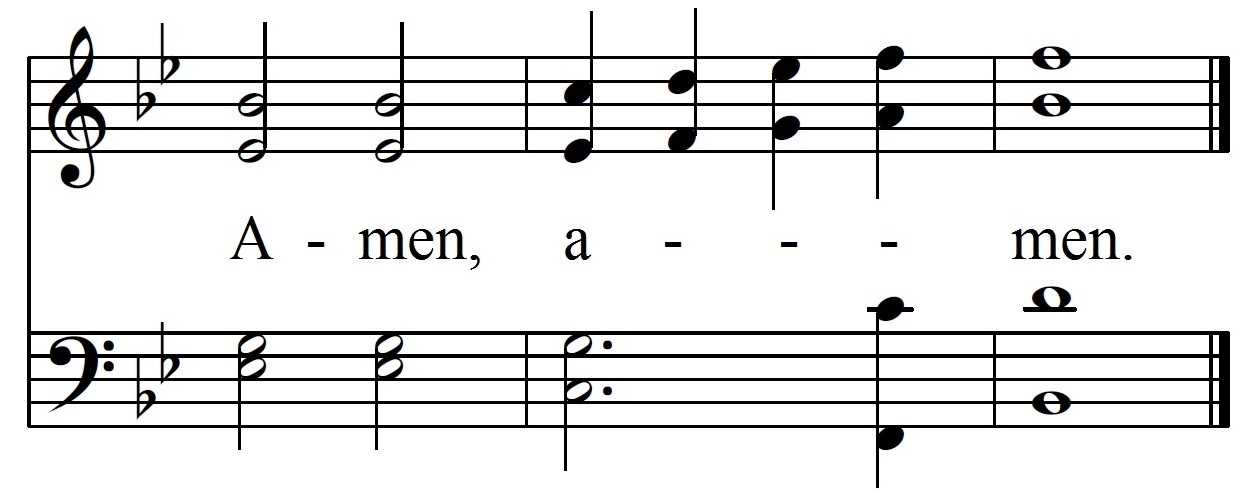
Dresden amen.

The Dresden Amen (Dresdner Amen) is a sequence of seven notes sung by choirs during church services in the German state of Saxony since the beginning of the 19th century. The motif was first used in, and is particularly associated with, the city of Dresden.

The sequence has been used in various forms by composers since the 19th century.

== Composition ==
The Dresden amen was composed by Johann Gottlieb Naumann (1741–1801) for use in the Royal chapel in Dresden. Its popularity spread to other churches, both Catholic and Lutheran, in Saxony. The "Dresden amen" is actually the second and third parts of a threefold amen.

== Use in classical music ==
Felix Mendelssohn used the Dresden amen in his fifth symphony, the "Reformation". In the first movement, the theme appears in the strings:

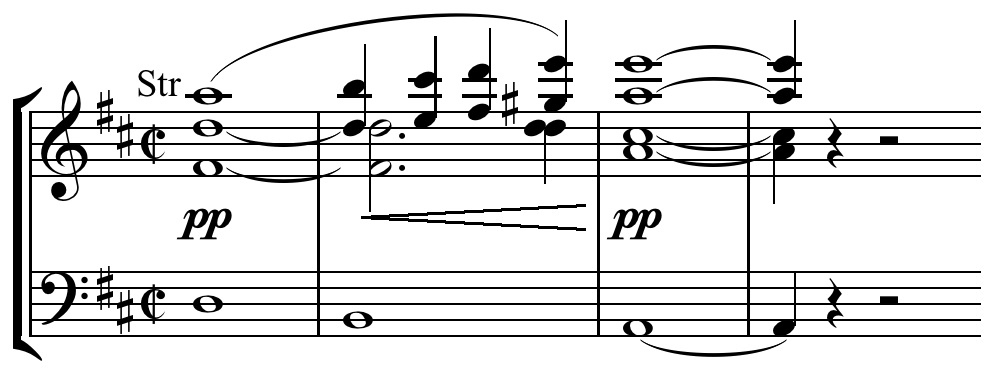

The theme was also used by Richard Wagner, most notably in his last opera, Parsifal. Wagner was a Kapellmeister in Dresden from 1842 to 1849, but he would probably have learnt the motif as a boy attending church in Dresden. It was incorporated into one of his earliest operas, Das Liebesverbot, and also appears in the third act of Tannhäuser.

Anton Bruckner used the Dresden amen in several motets (Christus factus est WAB 11, Virga Jesse WAB 52 and Vexilla regis WAB 51), the finale of his Fifth Symphony and the adagio of his last symphony, the Ninth, while Gustav Mahler incorporated it into the last movement of his First Symphony. Manuel de Falla quoted from it in his incidental music for Calderón de la Barca's El gran teatro del mundo.

Charles Villiers Stanford used a slightly expanded Dresden Amen at the end of his Nunc Dimittis in B-flat, op. 10 (1879).

Alexander Scriabin inserted a theme reminiscent of the Dresden amen in the first movement (Luttes ["Struggles"]) of his Symphony no. 3.

Eric Ball's tone poem The Kingdom Triumphant, a musical picture of the first and second coming of Christ, uses the Dresden amen prior to the presentation of the hymn Helmsley with its associated words "Lo, He comes with clouds descending".

Carl Davis used the Dresden Amen prominently in his score for the sound-added reissue of the 1925 silent film Ben-Hur, particularly in scenes featuring the life of Christ.

John Sanders based his Responses for Evensong on the Dresden Amen. Igor Stravinsky starts the 3rd movement of the Symphony of Psalms with a shortened version of the Dresden Amen, finishing with a dominant chord on the tonic pedal note.
