= Gustaf Wasa =

Swedish-language opera

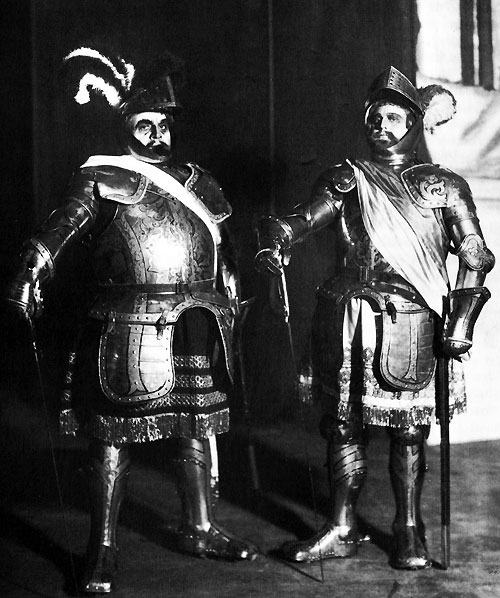
Emile Steinem as Kristan II and David Stockman as Gustav Eriksson in a production of Gustaf Wasa

Gustaf Wasa is an opera in three acts with music by Johann Gottlieb Naumann. The work uses a Swedish-language libretto by Johan Henrik Kellgren that is based on a draft crafted by King Gustavus III of Sweden. The plot of the opera details the events of the Swedish War of Liberation. It premiered at the Royal Swedish Opera (RSO) on 19 January 1786. The RSO made a recording of the opera which was released on Virgin Classics in 1996.
