= Bergtheim =

- Municipality
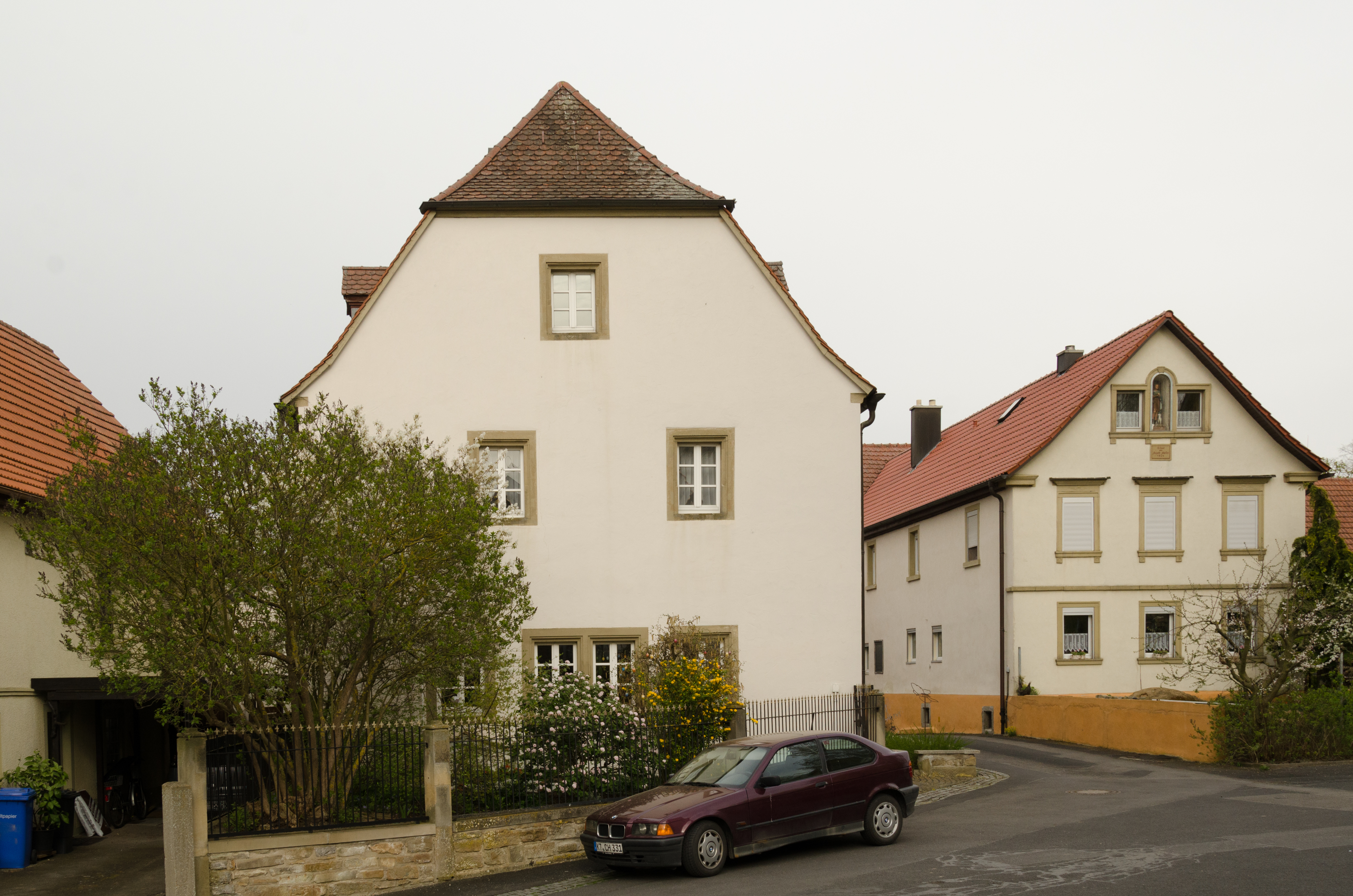
- Houses at the church square in Bergtheim-Dipbach

- Coat of arms

- Location of Bergtheim within Würzburg district
- Interactive map of Bergtheim
- Location within Germany Location within Bavaria
- Coordinates: 49°54′N 10°4′E
- Country: Germany
- State: Bavaria
- Admin. region: Unterfranken
- District: Würzburg
- Municipal assoc.: Bergtheim

Government
  - Mayor (2020–26): Konrad Schlier (CSU)

Area
  - Total: 26.48 km^{2} (10.22 sq mi)
- Elevation: 216 m (709 ft)

Population (2025-12-31)
  - Total: 3,709
  - Density: 140.1/km^{2} (362.8/sq mi)
- Time zone: UTC+01:00 (CET)
  - Summer (DST): UTC+02:00 (CEST)
- Postal codes: 97241
- Dialling codes: 09367
- Vehicle registration: WÜ
- Website: www.bergtheim.de

Bergtheim is a municipality in the district of Würzburg in Bavaria, Germany.
