= Oberpleichfeld =

- Municipality
- Coat of arms

- Location of Oberpleichfeld within Würzburg district
- Interactive map of Oberpleichfeld
- Location within Germany Location within Bavaria
- Coordinates: 49°53′N 10°5′E
- Country: Germany
- State: Bavaria
- Admin. region: Unterfranken
- District: Würzburg
- Municipal assoc.: Bergtheim

Government
  - Mayor (2020–26): Martina Rottmann (CSU)

Area
  - Total: 8.66 km^{2} (3.34 sq mi)
- Elevation: 263 m (863 ft)

Population (2025-12-31)
  - Total: 1,133
  - Density: 131/km^{2} (339/sq mi)
- Time zone: UTC+01:00 (CET)
  - Summer (DST): UTC+02:00 (CEST)
- Postal codes: 97241
- Dialling codes: 09367
- Vehicle registration: WÜ
- Website: www.oberpleichfeld.de

Oberpleichfeld is a municipality in the district of Würzburg in Bavaria, Germany.
