= Symphony No. 5 (Mendelssohn) =

Symphony by Felix Mendelssohn

- Reformation
- by Felix Mendelssohn
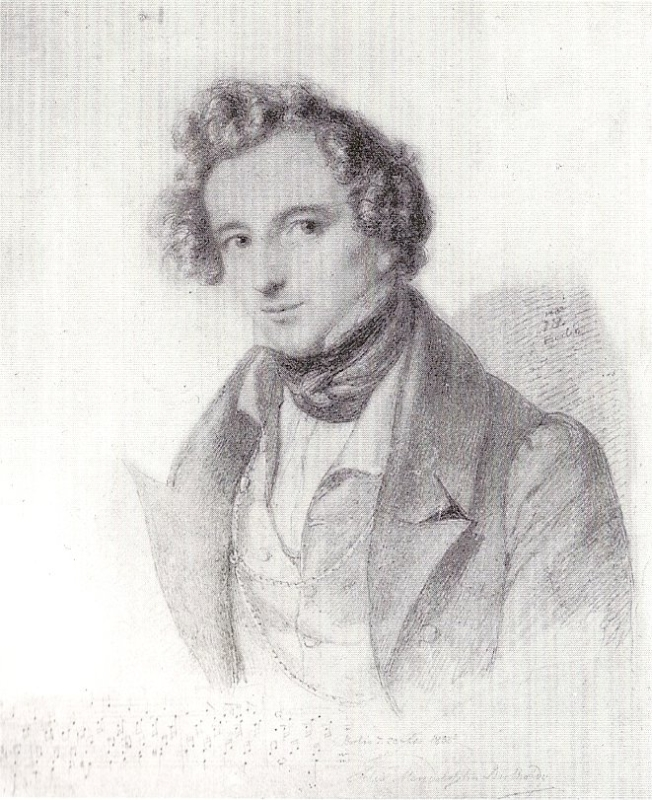
- Drawing of the composer by Eduard Bendemann, 1833
- Key: D major/minor
- Opus: 107
- Occasion: Tercentennial of the Augsburg Confession
- Composed: 1830
- Performed: 1832
- Published: 1868
- Movements: 4

The Symphony No. 5 in D major/minor, Op. 107, known as the Reformation, was composed by Felix Mendelssohn in 1830 in honor of the 300th anniversary of the Presentation of the Augsburg Confession. The Confession is a key document of Lutheranism and its Presentation to Emperor Charles V in June 1530 was a momentous event of the Protestant Reformation. This symphony was written for a full orchestra and was Mendelssohn's second extended symphony.

It was not published until 1868, 21 years after the composer's death – hence its numbering as '5'. Although the symphony is not very frequently performed, it is better known today than when it was originally published. Mendelssohn's sister, Fanny Hensel, chose the name Reformation Symphony.

== History ==
In December 1829, a year before the King of Prussia Frederick William III had even announced the tercentennial Augsburg celebrations, Mendelssohn began work on the Reformation Symphony. Mendelssohn hoped to have it performed at the festivities in Berlin which took place on 25 June 1830. He had intended to finish the composition by January 1830 and tour for four months before the celebrations began in June. However, his ill health caused the Reformation Symphony to take longer to compose than he had initially expected. In late March the symphony was still in a state of fabrication, and in an inauspicious turn of events Mendelssohn caught measles from his sister Rebecka. With a further delay of the composing and touring, Mendelssohn eventually completed the symphony in May. Unfortunately, it was too late for the Augsburg commission to recognize the symphony for the celebrations.

Some authorities have suggested that antisemitism may have played a role in the symphony's absence from Augsburg. But the successful competitor, Eduard Grell, had already established himself as a competent and successful composer who was gaining considerable popularity in Berlin. Grell was extremely conservative in his compositions; his piece for male chorus perhaps matched what the Augsburg celebrations demanded, in contrast to Mendelssohn's extensive symphony, which may have been thought inappropriate at the time.

Mendelssohn resumed his touring immediately after he had completed the Reformation Symphony. In Paris, in 1832, François Antoine Habeneck's orchestra turned the work down as 'too learned'; the music historian Larry Todd suggests that perhaps they also felt it to be too Protestant. He did not offer the symphony for performance at London. During the summer of 1832, Mendelssohn returned to Berlin where he revised the symphony. Later that year a performance of the Reformation Symphony finally took place. By 1838 however Mendelssohn regarded the symphony as 'a piece of juvenilia', and he never performed it again. It was not performed again until 1868, more than 20 years after the composer's death.

== Key ==
The key of the symphony is stated as D major on the title page of Mendelssohn's autograph score. However, only the slow introduction is written in D major, whereas the main theme and the cadence setting of the first movement are in D minor. The composer himself referred to the symphony on at least one occasion as in D minor. Nobody nowadays can agree whether it can be identified to be in either major or minor, if not both.

== Instrumentation ==
The symphony is scored for 2 flutes, 2 oboes, 2 clarinets, 2 bassoons, "serpente" and contrabassoon (fourth movement only, now played either on contrabassoon alone or on contrabassoon and tuba), 2 horns, 2 trumpets, 3 trombones, timpani and strings.

== Movements ==
External audio
- Performed by the Berlin Philharmonic under Herbert von Karajan
- I. Andante
- II. Allegro vivace
- III. Andante
- IV. Andante con moto

The symphony is in four movements:

1. Andante – Allegro con fuoco (D major – D minor)
2. Allegro vivace (B♭ major, trio in G major)
3. Andante (G minor, ending in G major)
4. Andante con moto – Allegro vivace – Allegro maestoso (G major – D major)

A typical performance lasts about 33 minutes.

=== I. Andante – Allegro con fuoco ===
During the slow introduction, Mendelssohn cites the "Dresden Amen" on the strings. Mendelssohn's version of the "Dresden Amen" is as follows:

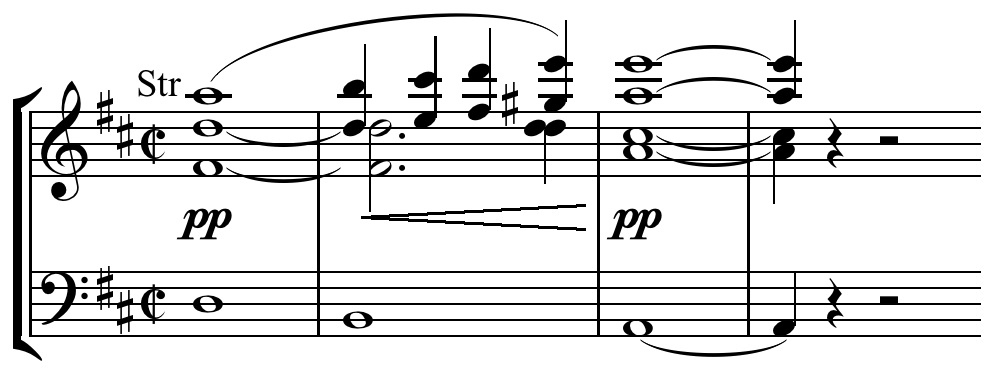

(The "Dresden Amen" was also adapted by Richard Wagner as the "Grail" leitmotif in his 1882 opera Parsifal or by Anton Bruckner in the finale of his Fifth Symphony and the adagio of the Ninth.)

The strings are interrupted by battle-cries from the brass section as follows:

The "Dresden Amen" soon reappears on the strings and the Allegro con fuoco section, which is in sonata form, then begins. It opens as follows:

=== II. Allegro vivace ===
The second movement, a B♭ major scherzo, is very different in spirit from the first movement, being much lighter in tone.

=== III. Andante ===
The third movement, in G minor, is a lyrical piece primarily for the strings. The movement begins with a melodic quote from the traditional Jewish or hassidic tune Hevenu Shalom Aleichem ("We brought peace upon you") and is repeated throughout. There are references to the "Dresden Amen", and, at the movement's end, to the second theme of the first movement.

=== IV. Andante con moto – Allegro vivace – Allegro maestoso ===
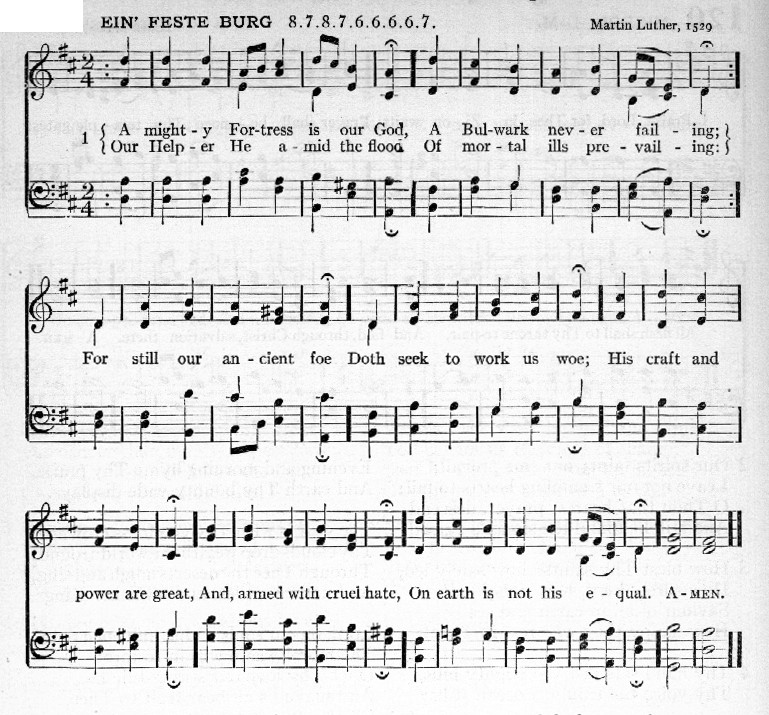
Luthers' original hymn, "Ein feste Burg ist unser Gott"

The fourth movement is based on Martin Luther's chorale "Ein feste Burg ist unser Gott" ("A mighty fortress is our God"). It is in sonata form and is mostly in 4/4 time. There are a few unmarked meter changes to 2/4 to fit the meter of the original chorale. At the very end of the coda, a powerful version of Martin Luther's chorale is played by the entire orchestra.
