= Thorildsplan =

Park in Stockholm, Sweden

Coordinates: 59°19′53″N 18°00′53″E

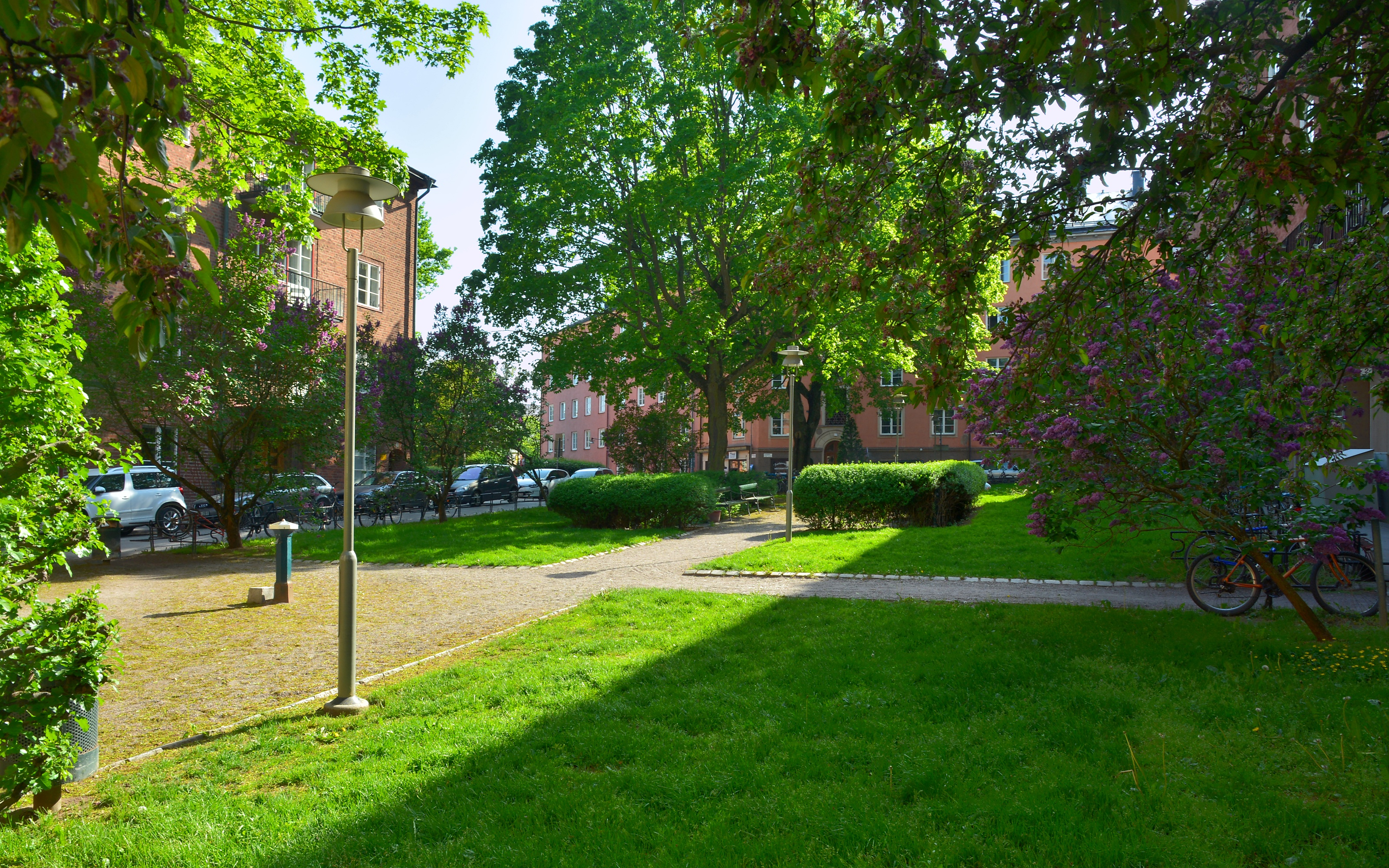
Thorildsplan

Thorildsplan is a small park in the residential area of Kristineberg in Stockholm, Sweden.

Thorildsplan is northwest of Kungsholmen, west of Lindhagensgatan and north of Drottningsolmsvägen. Thorildsplan Stockholm Metro station was commissioned in 1952 when the Hötorget-Vällingby metro was opened. The park was named in 1925 after the writer Thomas Thorild (1759–1808).

In the late 1920s, a maternity clinic (Pro Patria) was built and designed by Carl Westman. It was located close to Thorildsplan on Thorildsvägen 5. In 1980, the property was sold to the building board. Today it is a residential building.
