= Thomas Thorild =

Swedish poet, critic, feminist and philosopher

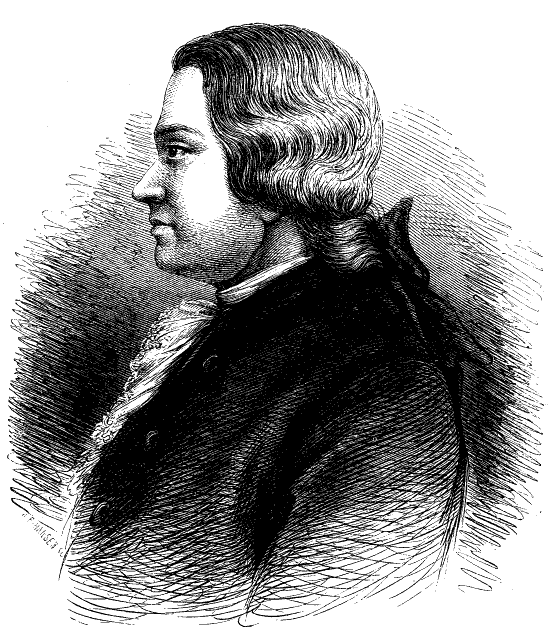
- Born: 18 April 1759; Svarteborg, Bohuslän
- Died: 1 October 1808 (aged 49); Greifswald, Swedish Pomerania

Academic background
- Education: Lund University

Academic work
- Discipline: philosophy
- Institutions: University of Greifswald
- Main interests: gender equality
- Notable works: Om kvinnokönets naturliga höghet

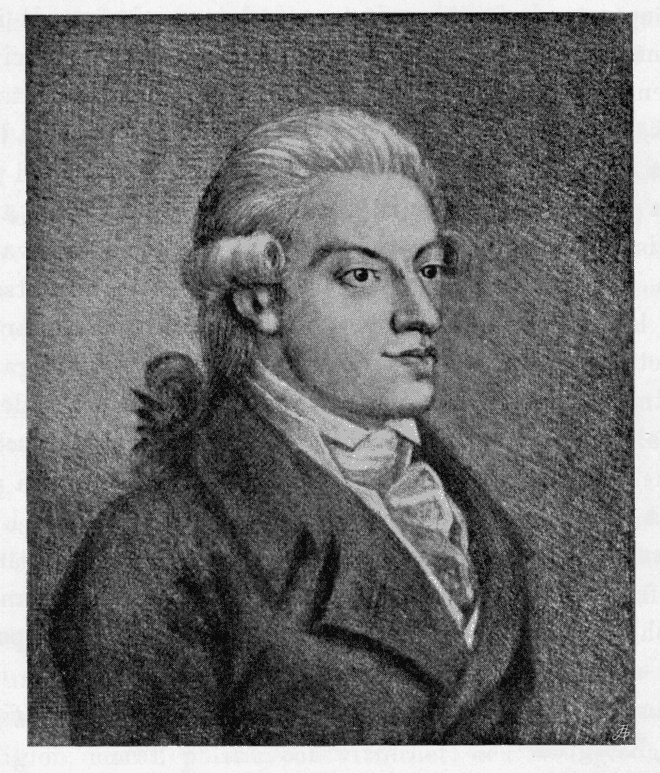
Thomas Thorild

Thomas Thorild (Svarteborg, Bohuslän, 18 April 1759 – Greifswald, Swedish Pomerania, 1 October 1808), was a Swedish poet, critic, feminist and philosopher. He was noted for his early support of women's rights. In his 1793 treatise Om kvinnokönets naturliga höghet he advocated gender equality.

He was born in Svarteborg, Sweden, and died at Greifswald, which was then Swedish Pomerania, and is now part of the German state of Mecklenburg-Vorpommern. His original name was Thomas Thorén and he studied at Lund University in Sweden and worked or studied at the University of Greifswald in Germany.

Thorild was a supporter of the Sturm und Drang movement and considered an opponent of French-inspired classicism. In 1795 he became a professor and librarian at the University of Greifswald.

He was an important member of the cultural elite in Stockholm during the Gustavian era. He was popular among women because of his beauty and because of his ideas of gender equality; he aroused much attention with his idea, that just as a man was seen as a person first, and as a man (a gender and sexual object) second, a woman, who was seen as a gender and sexual object first and as a person second, should have the right to be seen upon the same way: "Just as foolish as it is to regard a woman only in the capacity of a SHE, it would be to regard a man only in the capacity of a HE".

In Uppsala University's main building from 1887 Thorild is cited above the entrance to the auditorium:

"Thinking freely is great

But thinking right is greater"

Thorildsplan in Stockholm is named after him.

== Works ==
English language

- The sermon of sermons on the impiety of priests and the fall of religion. 1789
- True heavenly religion restored and demonstrated upon eternal principles : With a call to Christians of higher sense. 1790
