= Battle of Ognon =

- Part of Franco-Prussian War
| Date | 22 October 1870 |
| Location | Ognon River, France |
| Result | German Victory. |

Belligerents
| French Republic | North German Confederation: Prussia; Baden |

Commanders and leaders
| Albert Cambriels | August von Werder; Gustav Friedrich von Beyer |

Units involved
| 2 divisions of the Army of the Rhine | Baden Field Division; 2 battalions of the 30th Infantry Regiment |

Casualties and losses
| "Many Captured" | Unknown |

The Battle of Ognon was a battle in the Franco-Prussian War, which took place on 22 October 1870 at the Ognon River. In this battle the Prussian XIV Corps under the command of General Karl August von Werder, which also consisted of a division of the Grand Duchy of Baden, attacked elements of the French Army of the Rhine commanded by General Albert Cambriels. The Germans captured a large number of French prisoners. The German victory in the Battle of Ognon decided the fate of the Army of the Rhine, at least within two weeks thereafter.

== Battle ==
After the Siege of Strasbourg in September 1870, General Werder was marching westward. In order to complete and secure the conquest of the Alsace, Werder's first task was to drive the French forces out of the Vosges range, and on 1 October the advance elements of the German XIV Corps, led by General Alfred von Degenfeld, began marching through the Vosges. Through the passes there was no resistance and the first major clash between the German and French armies took place on the western slopes of the mountain range, ending with Degenfeld's victory over the newly formed French "Eastern Army". As Cambriels had made efforts to restructure his army, Werder believed that he must first face this enemy before advancing further into France, contrary to the orders from the Chief of the General Staff of the Prussian Army, General Helmuth von Moltke.

With Moltke's permission to extend his operations to Besançon, General Werder took Vesoul in late October 1870. Meanwhile, General Cambriels reorganized his forces and established a strong position at Kuoz and Etuz along the River Oignon to halt the German advance. On 22 October 1870 his two divisions suffered yet another defeat: General Werder ordered General Gustav Friedrich von Beyer to drive the French back to Besançon. Beyer's command consisted of Degenfeld's brigade (with part of Keller's brigade), Prince Wiliam of Baden's brigade and two battalions of the 30th Infantry Regiment; and was heavily outnumbered. Degenfeld had the first contact with the French, later joined by Keller and Prince William of Baden. Both sides struggled for a long time, but in the end, Beyer's troops captured the French positions. In the chaos, the French retreated across the river, and were forced to abandon the village of Auxon-dessus they had temporarily captured. Once again, Cambriels' army had to retreat to the walls of Besançon.

== Aftermath ==
Afterwards the German victory the 30th Infantry Regiment, part of the reserve forces, pursued the enemy. The next day, German troops attacked positions at Châtillon-le-Duc, north of Besançon, which the Germans had held the day before. The attack failed but forced the French to withdraw. Despite this, the Prussian Army withdrew from Besançon on 24 October 1870, before Werder defeated Giuseppe Garibaldi's Army of the Vosges at Gray on 27 October.
