= Battle of Hundheim =

1866 battle between Prussia and Baden

- Part of Austro-Prussian War
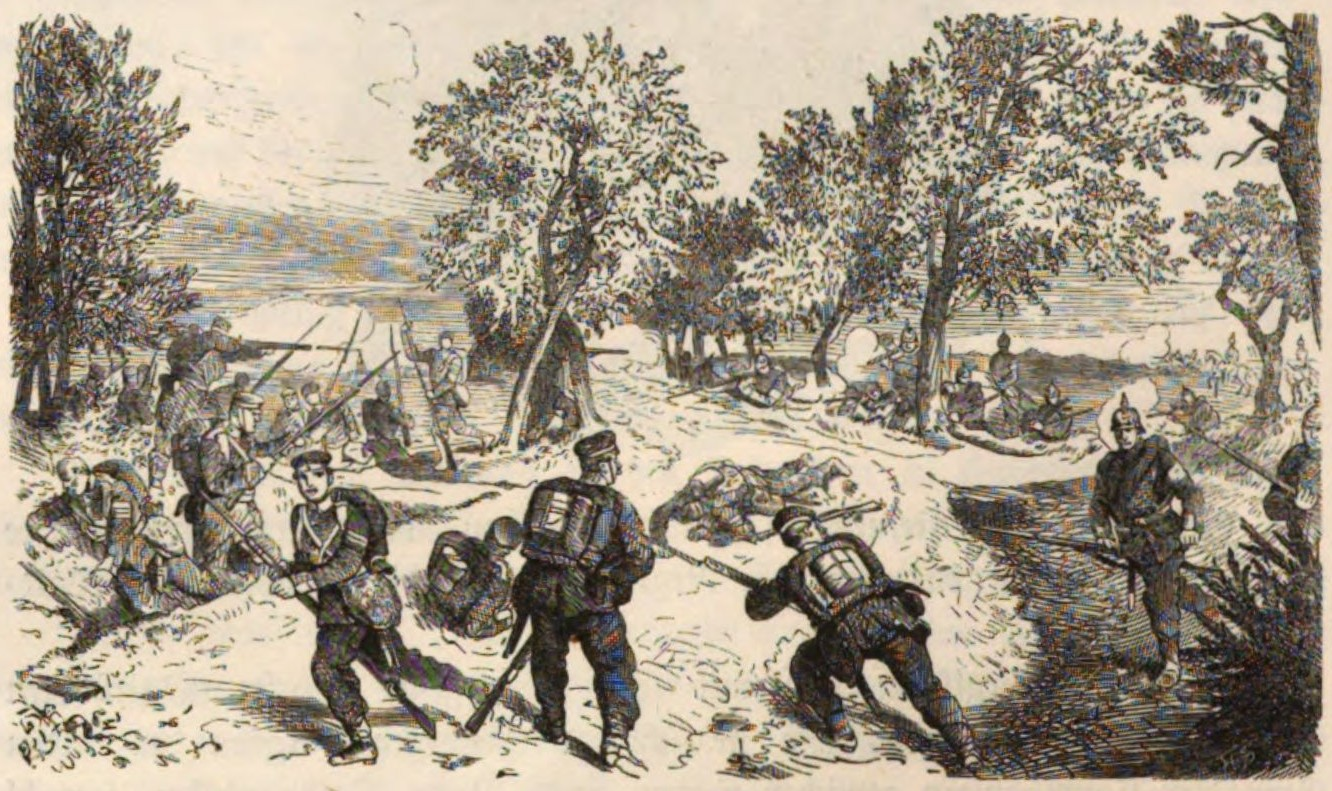
Date	23 July 1866
Location	Hundheim, Baden 49°42′14″N 9°27′20″E
Result	Prussian–Saxe-Coburg–Gotha victory

Belligerents
Prussia; Saxe-Coburg and Gotha	Baden

Commanders and leaders
Edwin von Manteuffel; Eduard von Flies; Hermann von Fabeck	Prince Wilhelm of Baden; Karl von La Roche; Freiherr von Neubronn

Units involved
Magdeburg Dragoon Regiment No. 6	1st Infantry Brigade; 2nd Infantry Brigade

Strength
1,300 soldiers	4,500 soldiers

Casualties and losses
5 dead; 15 wounded	13 dead; 56 wounded; 23 missing people
- Location within Germany Battle of Hundheim (Europe)

The Battle of Hundheim took place during the Austro-Prussian War as part of the Campaign of the Main on 23 July 1866 between the combined forces of the Prussia and Saxe-Coburg and Gotha against the armies of Baden.

== Background ==
After his invasion of Frankfurt, the commander of the Prussian Army on the Main, Eduard Vogel von Falckenstein, was recalled and replaced by Edwin von Manteuffel. In addition, the army was reinforced to 60,000 men. After crossing the Odenwald, there were battles with Baden, Hessian and Württemberg units of the VIII Corps of the Federal Army on the Tauber until 24 July.

The 8th Federal Corps, consisting of four divisions under the command of Alexander von Hessen-Darmstadt, was divided into the following locations on the day of the battle:

- ( Württemberg ) division near Tauberbischofsheim under Lieutenant General Oskar von Hardegg with Hegelmaier's brigade advanced to Külsheim-Wolferstetten
- ( Baden ) division on the right wing near Hundheim under Lieutenant General Prince Wilhelm of Baden
- (Grand-Ducal Hessian) division near Hardheim and Schweinberg under Lieutenant General von Perglas
- (Austrian- Nassau ) division on the left wing near Külsheim under Field Marshal Lieutenant Erwin von Neipperg

The VII Army Corps of the Federal Army was formed by the Bavarian Army . This corps under Prince Karl of Bavaria was in the Würzburg area. Prince Karl was also the commander-in-chief of the federal troops in southern Germany (West German Army) and the aim was to lead the two federal corps into battle against the Prussian Main Army.

The Prussian Main Army consisted of three divisions under Edwin von Manteuffel

- 13th Infantry Division under Lieutenant General August Karl von Goeben - which would advance on Amorbach
- Combined division under Major General Gustav von Beyer - which would advance on Miltenberg
- Combined division under Major General Eduard von Flies - which would advance on Nassig and Hundheim

== Participating Regiments ==
In this local battle on 23 July 1866 (about three weeks after the decisive Battle of Königgrätz) near Hundheim, the infantry regiment under Saxe-Coburg-Gotha met the combined Prussian division Flies under the command of Colonel Hermann von Fabeck while the Baden division under the command of Prince Wilhelm von Baden .

The Saxe-Coburg-Gotha infantry regiment had two infantry battalions. The brigade received support from a squadron of the Magdeburg Dragoon Regiment No. 6 and two guns, so that around 1,300 men were deployed.

The 1st Infantry Brigade of the Baden Division was deployed with five battalions and two artillery divisions - around 4,500 men.

Ordre de Bataille of the participating associations in a contemporary representation:

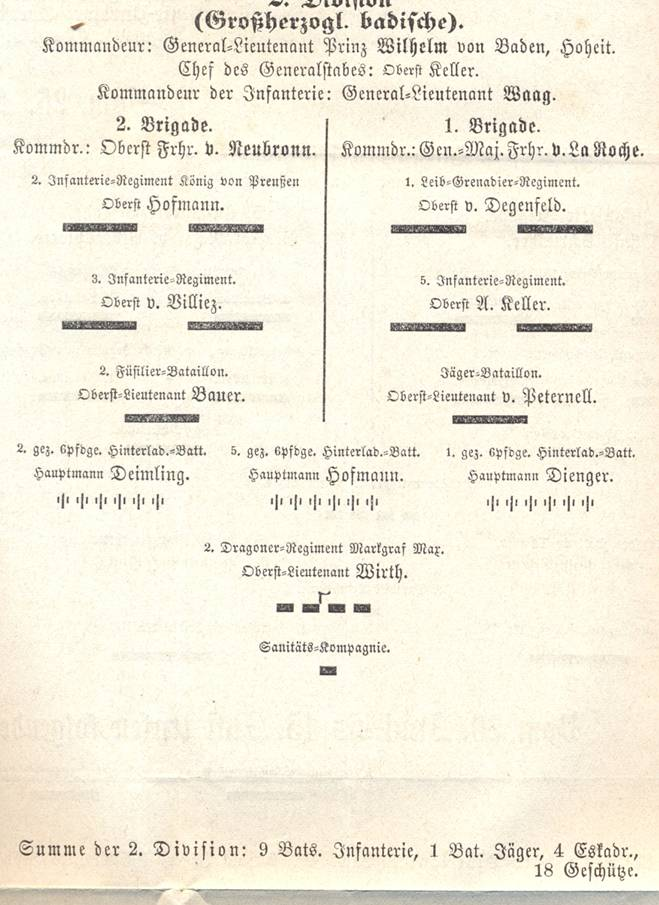
2. (bat.) Division in the VIII Federal Army Corps, 1866

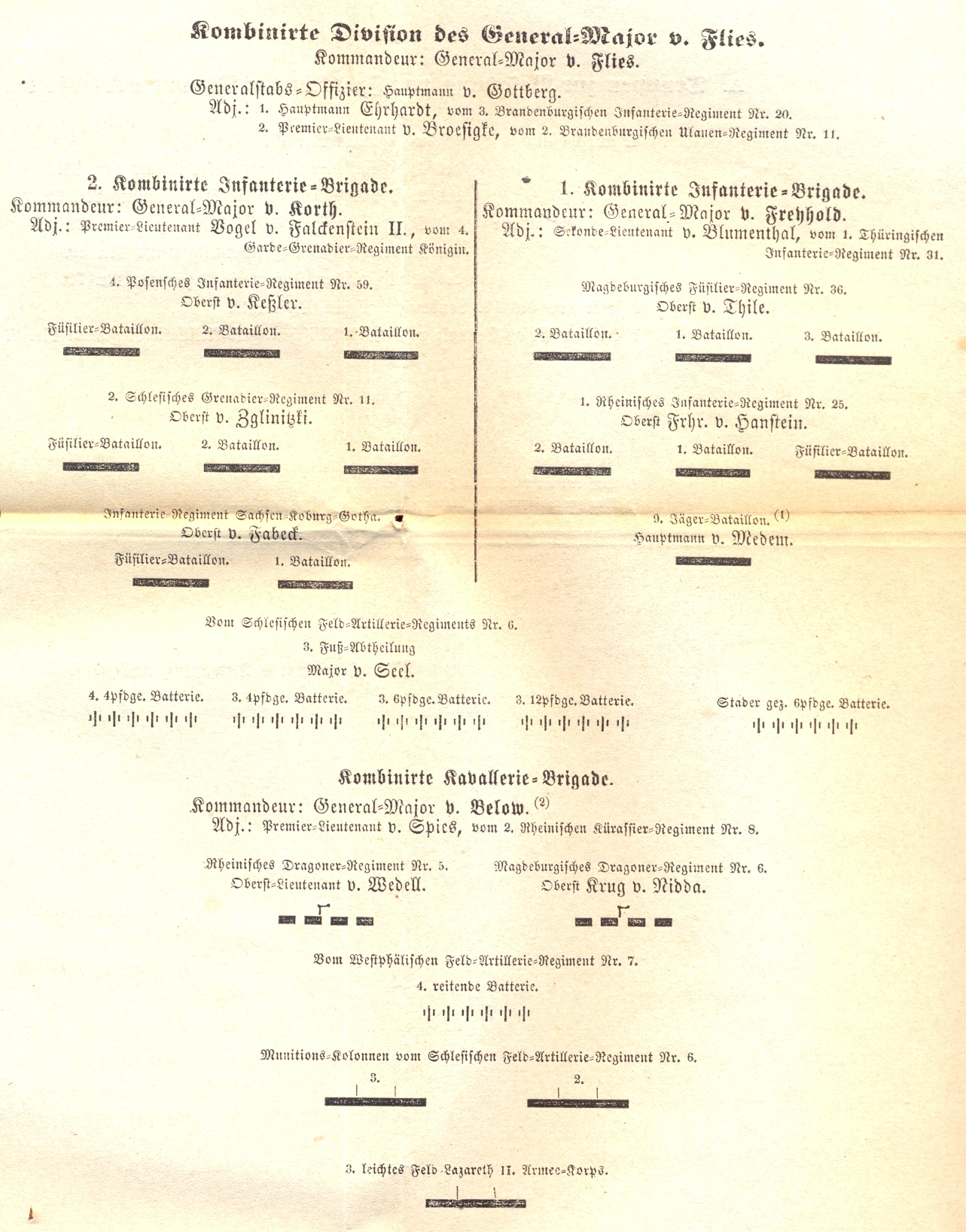
Combined Division Flies in the Prussian Main Army 1866

== Starting Positions ==
On the evening of 22 July Prince Wilhelm had set up outposts at Freudenberg and Eichenbühl and occupied Hundheim. On 23 July the 1st Baden Brigade moved into Hundheim under Major General Baron von La Roche. The 2nd Brigade under Colonel Freiherr von Neubronn was on standby south of it at Steinbach . Smaller departments stood at Wertheim to keep the connection to the VII Army Corps.

The combined Prussian division under Major General Eduard Moritz von Flies stood at Laudenbach on 22 July and advanced via Miltenberg on the 23rd. The aim was to advance to Nassig and secure the road in the Main Valley while the right wing was to occupy Hundheim.

== The Battle ==
After La Roche received news of the Prussian advance via Miltenberg, he sent two companies and two guns into the forest near the Tiefentaler Hof (on the road to Neunkirchen ) and half a company to Sonderriet. After 4 p.m. La Roche advanced with the 5th Infantry Regiment and the 2nd Battalion of the Grenadier Regiment, as well as an artillery detachment, to investigate Nassig. At the height of Sonderriet, La Roche noticed the Prussians advancing on Neunkirchen and turned back to Hundheim. Flies let his main power march on to Nassig via Sonderriet. Colonel Fabeck and the two battalions of the Saxe-Coburg and Gotha infantry regiment were to have two guns and one squadron of the Magdeburg Dragoon Regiment No. 6 occupy Hundheim.

In the forest east of the Tiefentaler Hof there was an initial exchange of fire between the Magdeburg cavalry and Baden infantry. The Coburg infantry now turned against the Birkhof. In the forest area Hintere Stauden located therethere was a lively firefight. With the help of their guns, the Coburgs were able to push back the 2nd Battalion of the 5th Baden Regiment in the direction of Ernsthof. The Magdeburg cavalry now wanted to pursue the Baden infantry. In the meantime, however, the 1st Battalion of the 5th Regiment was on the battlefield and more units of the 1st Brigade came from Hundheim. Fabeck withdrew cavalry and artillery to the starting positions and also collected his infantry at the Tiefentaler Hof, where he limited himself to defending his position. The people of Baden fired at these positions for a while with their artillery, but did not start a counterattack.

== Aftermath ==
Prince Alexander did not send the Baden division the desired reinforcement, as he was also expecting larger Prussian units from the direction of Walldürn. The Baden division was ordered back to Külsheim that night and went to Werbach the following day. The entire VIII Army Corps withdrew behind the Tauber line.

== Monuments ==
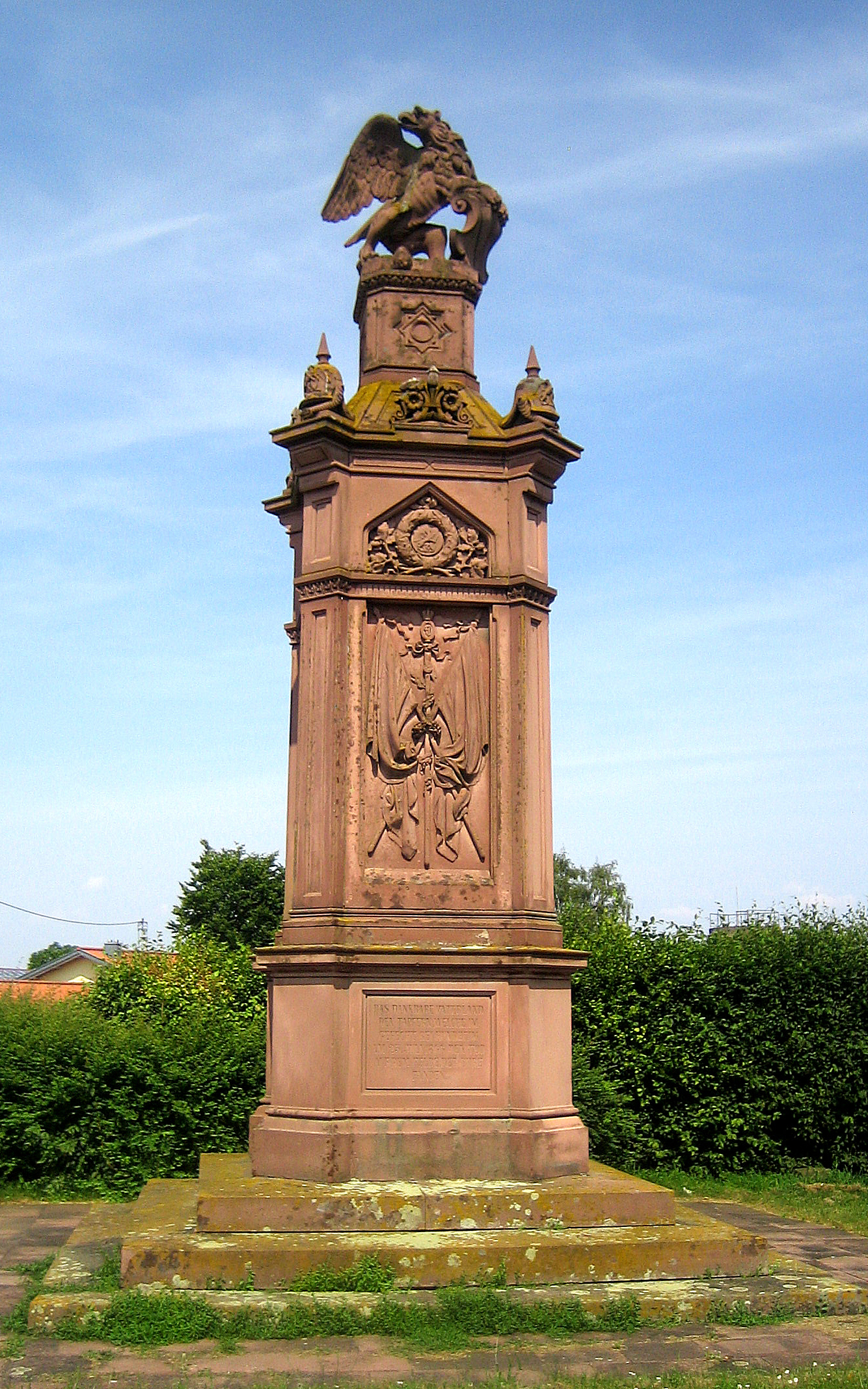
Memorial for the fallen soldiers of Baden at the "memorial settlement" near Hundheim

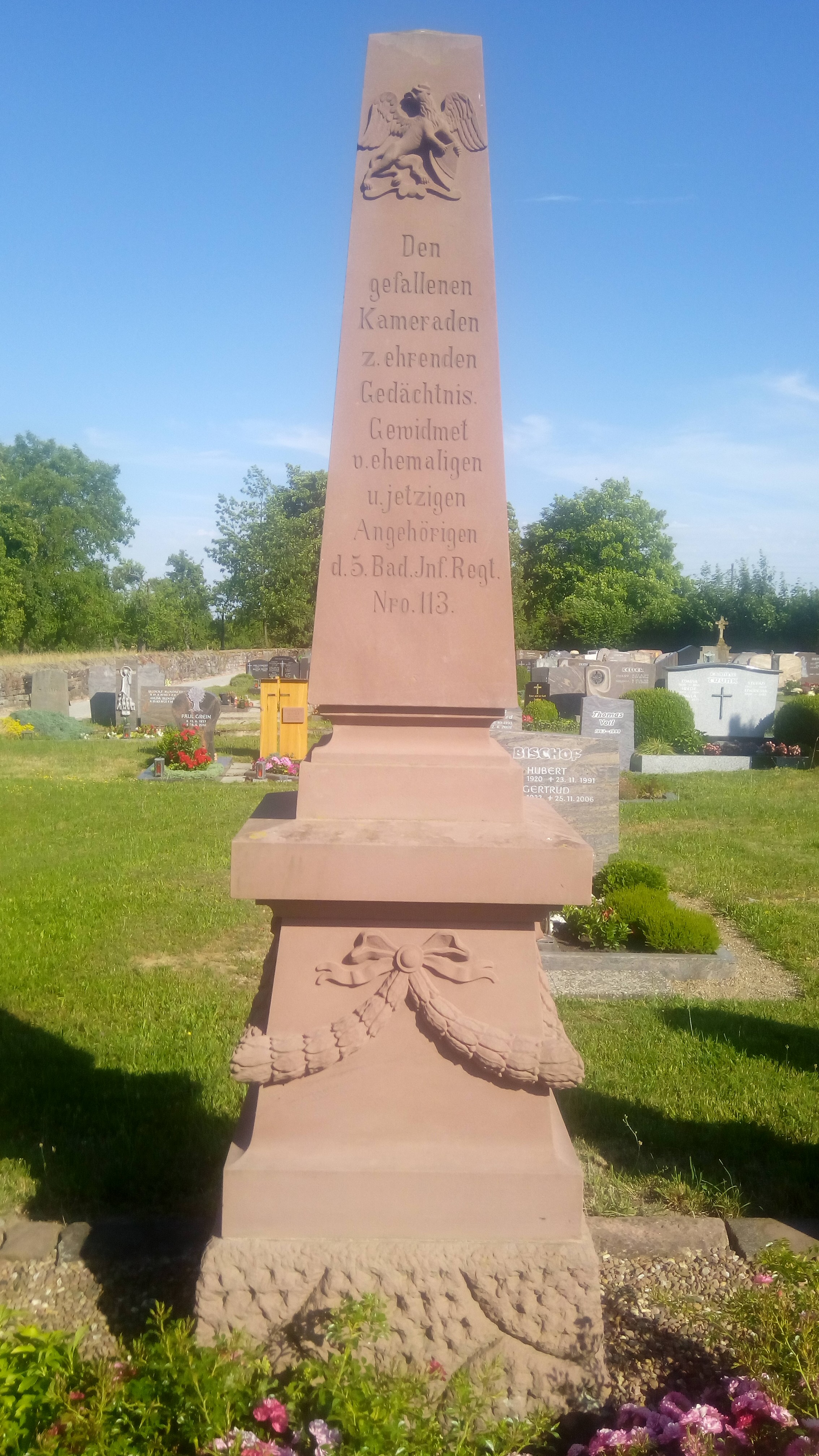
Memorial in Hundheim cemetery

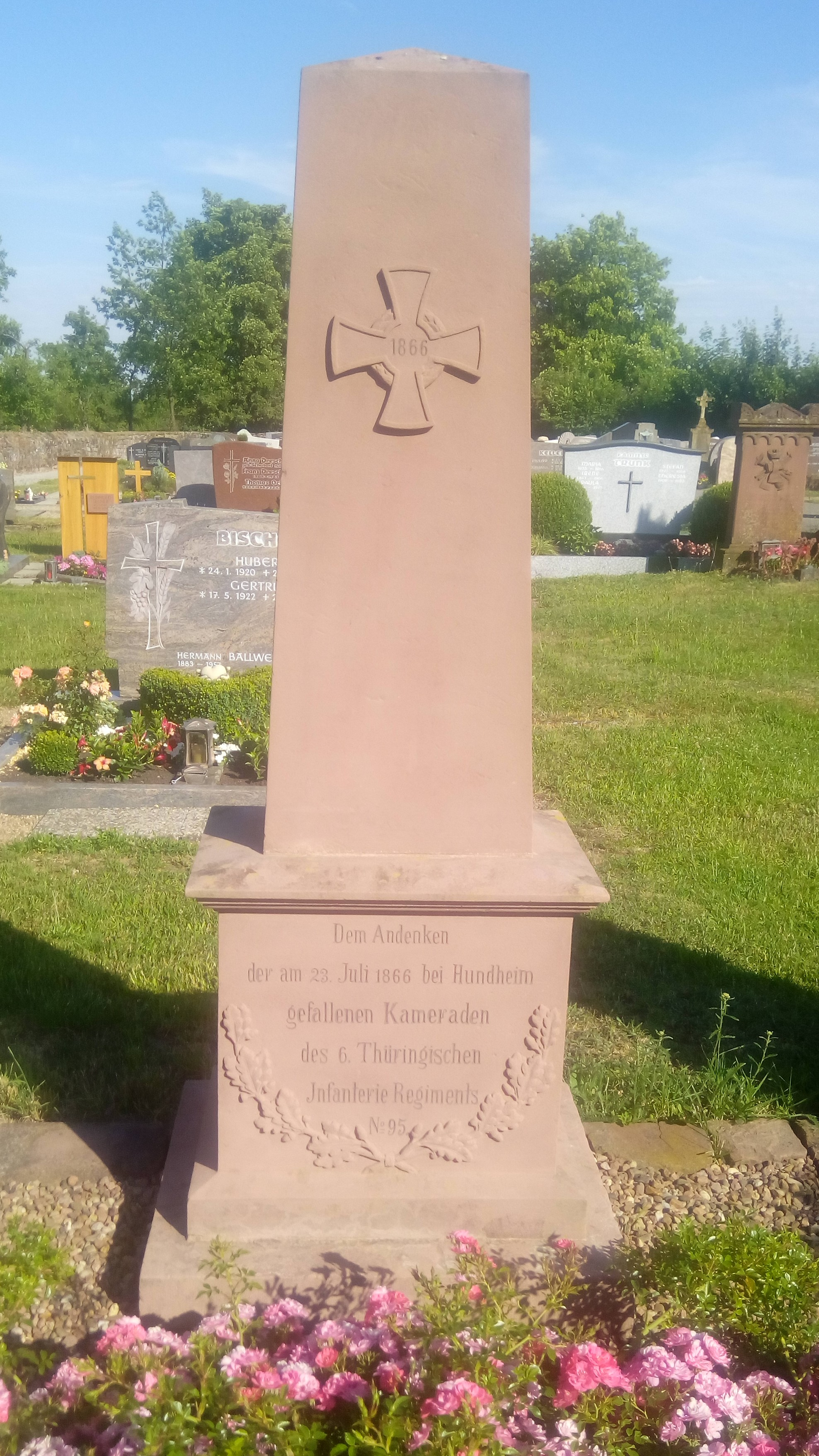
Memorial in Hundheim cemetery

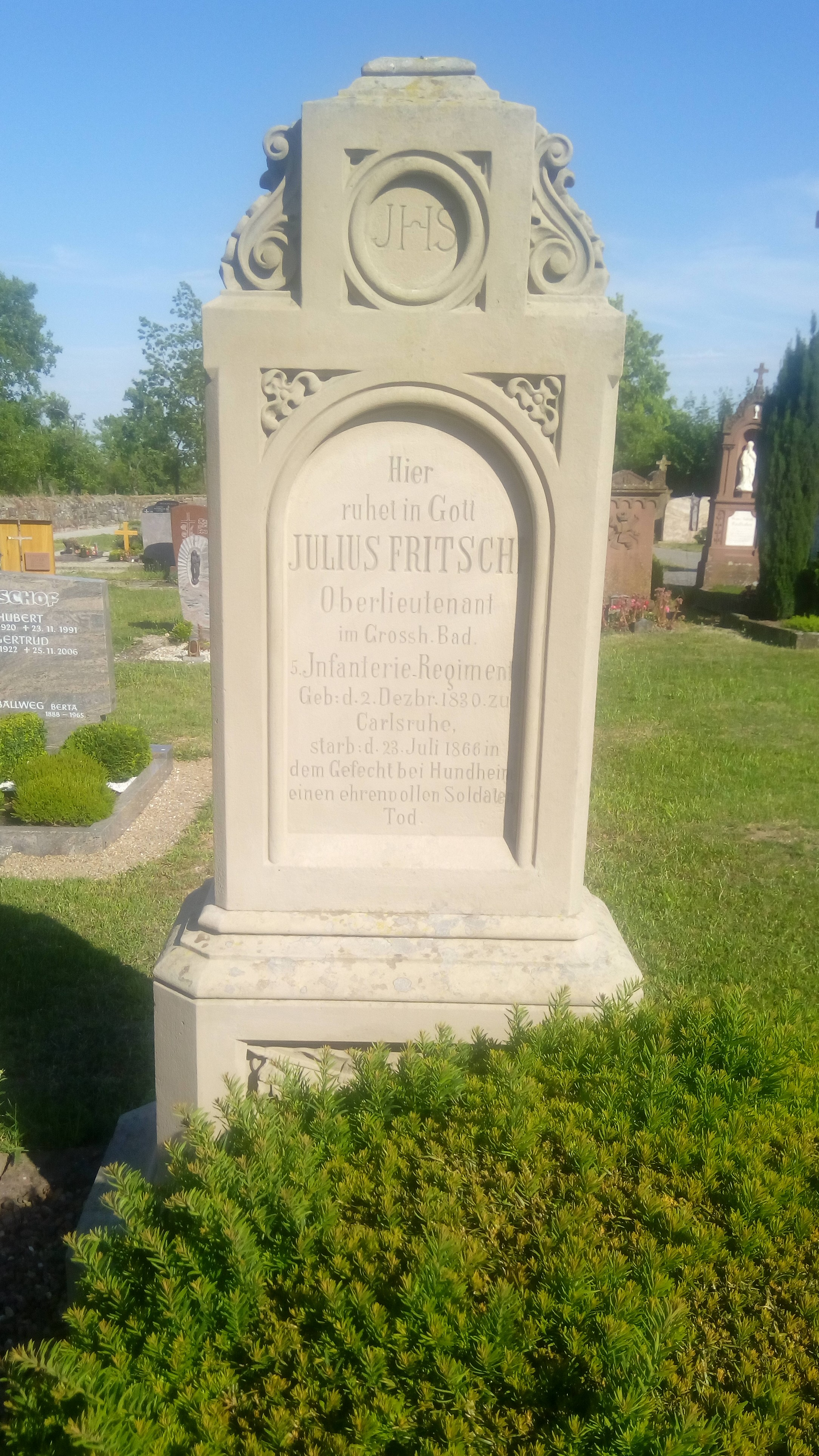
Soldier grave in Hundheim cemetery

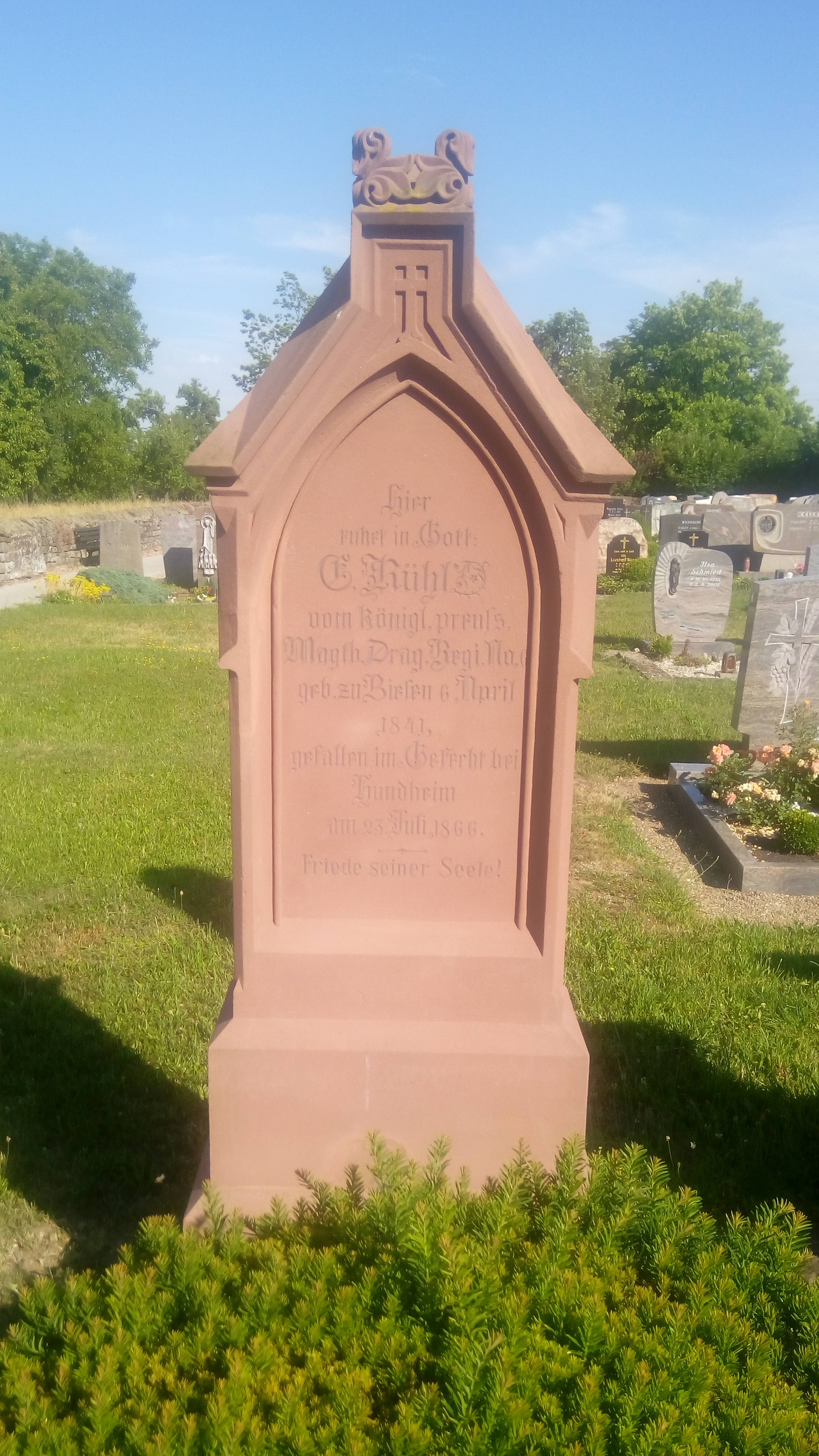
Soldier grave in Hundheim cemetery

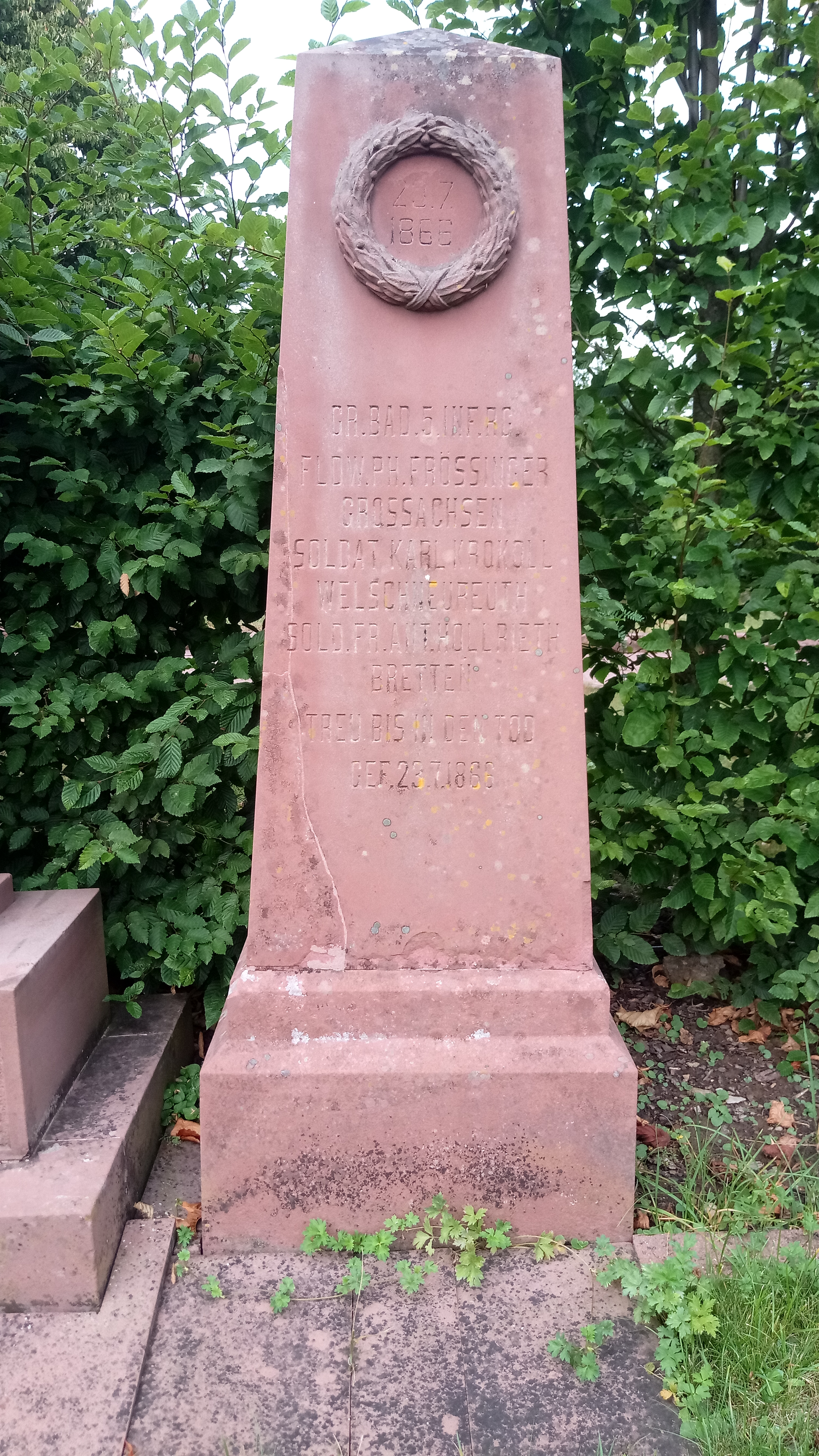
Gravesite of three soldiers from Baden in the Sonderrieter cemetery

== Literature ==
- Kriegsgeschichtliche Abteilung des Großen Generalstabs Hrsg.: Der Feldzug von 1866 in Deutschland, Ernst Siegfried Mittler und Sohn, Berlin 1867, S. 637–642 in der Google-Buchsuche
- Österreichs Kämpfe im Jahre 1866. Vom K.und K. Generalstab. Bureau für Kriegsgeschichte, 5. Band, Wien 1869, S. 129–132 online in der Google-Buchsuche
- Theodor Fontane: Der deutsche Krieg von 1866. 2. Band: Der Feldzug in West- und Mitteldeutschland. Berlin 1871, S. 203–207 online in der Google-Buchsuche
- Karl August Schneider: Der Antheil der badischen Felddivision an dem Kriege des Jahres 1866 in Deutschland. Von einem Angehörigen der badischen Felddivision., Geiger, 1867 Online
- Joseph Gabriel Zöller: Nach 30 Jahren!: die Gefechte bei Hundheim, Tauberbischofsheim & Werbach am 23. und 24. Juli 1866; mit einem geschichtlichen Rückblick; mit einer Ansicht von Tauberbischofsheim und den Denkmalen bei Tauberbischofsheim und Werbach, 1896
- Meinhold Lurz: »Das dankbare Vaterland den Tapfern«. Die Denkmäler für die 1866 in den Kämpfen bei Hundheim und Werbach gefallenen Angehörigen der badischen Armee. In: Jahrbuch 1984 des Historischen Vereins für Württembergisch Franken, S. 153–178
- Adolf Legde: Geschichte des 2. Badischen Dragoner-Regiments Nr. 21, Berlin 1893, S. 34–36
