= Battle of Roßbrunn =

- Part of Austro-Prussian War
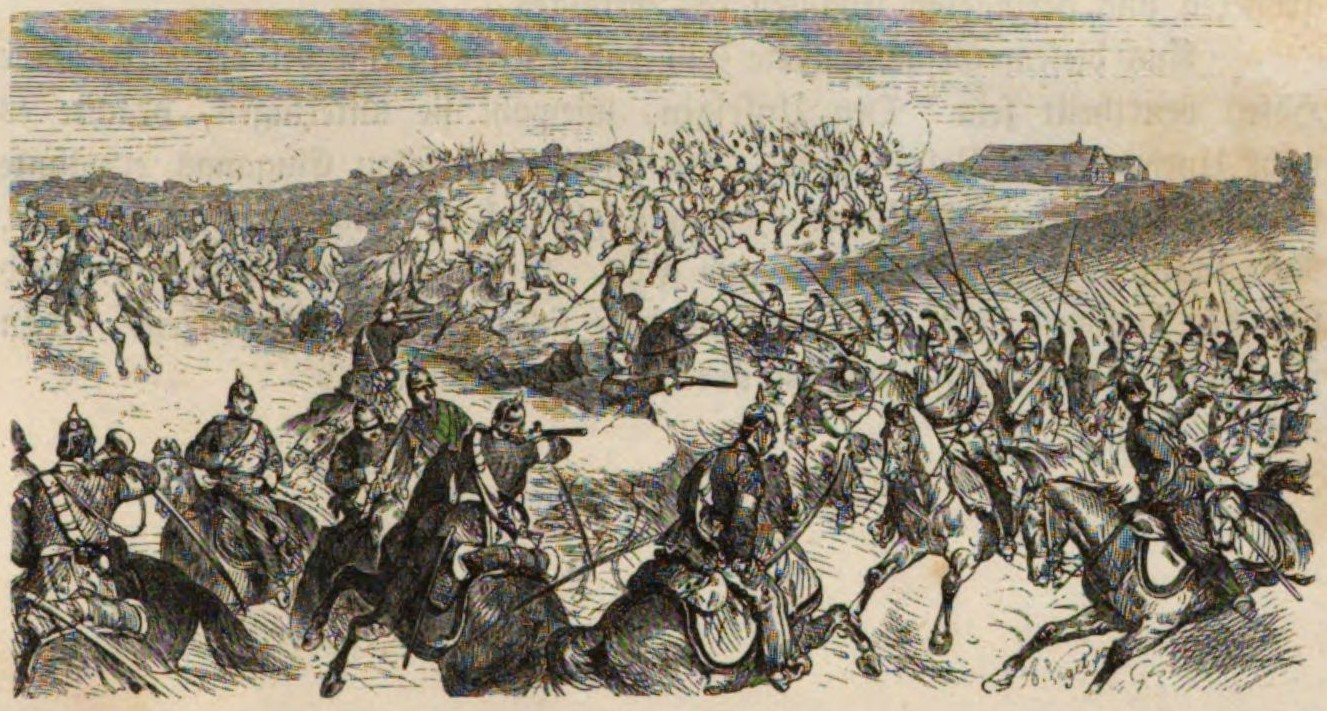
- Cavalry battle at the Hettstädter Höfe
Date	26 July 1866
Location	Roßbrunn, Uettingen, Hettstadt 49°47′26″N 9°45′15″E
Result	Bavarian Victory: End of Austro-Prussian War

Belligerents
Bavaria	Prussia

Commanders and leaders
Jakob von Hartmann; Maximilian von Feder	Eduard von Flies; Ludwig von Korth; Thassilo von Nidda; Hugo von Thile

Units involved
4th Division	Flies Division

Casualties and losses
94 dead 632 wounded 192 missing	101 dead 715 wounded 40 missing
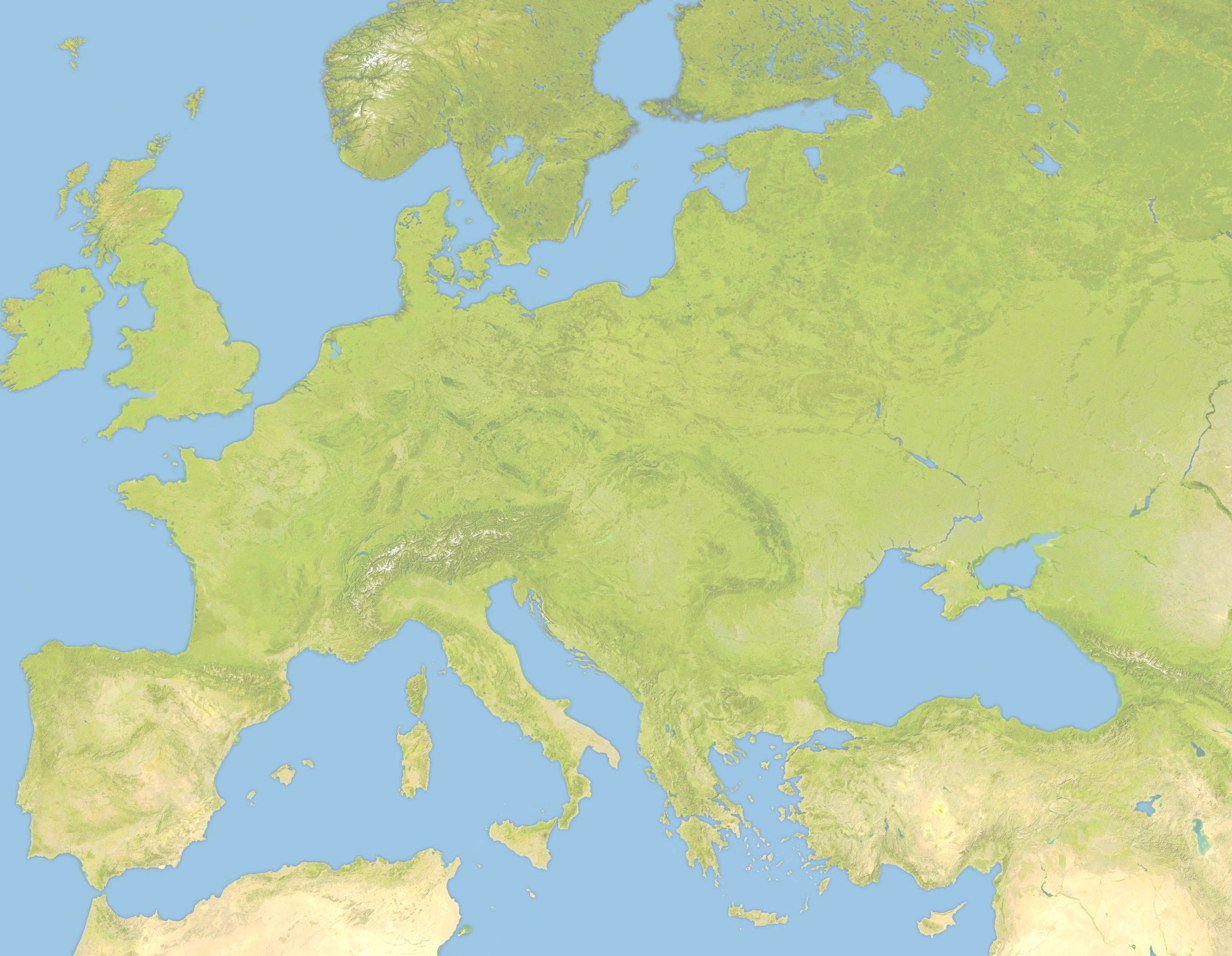
- Location within Germany Battle of Roßbrunn (Europe without the extreme north)

The Battle of Roßbrunn was the last battle of the Main Campaign in the Austro-Prussian War. It took place on 26 July 1866 near Roßbrunn, Uettingen and Hettstadt.

== Background ==
Prince Karl of Bavaria, the Commander-in-Chief of the West German Army of the German Confederation, planned an offensive of the VII and VIII Federal Corps against the Prussian Army under Edwin von Manteuffel. On 16 July 1866 however, the VIII. Corps was no longer ready to fight and withdrew towards Würzburg. Prince Karl wanted to hold the plateau near Hettstadt, and thus Würzburg, in order to keep up Bavaria's negotiating position in the upcoming peace negotiations.

== The Battle ==
=== Fighting at Uettingen and Roßbrunn ===
The 2nd Combined Infantry Brigade under Major General Ludwig von Korth, part of the Prussian Division Flies, occupied Uettingen with two battalions late on 25 July and moved into night quarters west of the village with the majority of the brigade.

The Bavarian 2nd Division under Major General Maximilian von Feder and the Bavarian 4th Division under Major General Jakob von Hartmann were positioned near Roßbrunn. The rest of the Bavarian Army was concentrated behind it between Hettstadt and Waldbrunn.

At 4 a.m., units of the Bavarian 5th Infantry Regiment attacked the Prussians in Uettingen.

On the left flank Major General von Korth had the Kirchberg stormed by the 59th (4th Posen) Infantry Regiment. Parts of the Bavarian 5th and 13th Infantry regiments as well as the 8th Jäger Battalion defended the Kirchberg, but could not hold it and had to retreat to the Hessnert with considerable losses.

The 36th (Magdeburg) Fusilier Regiment under Colonel Hugo von Thile stormed the Osnert on the right flank, with considerable losses (including two battalion commanders). Units of the Bavarian 7th and 10th Infantry Regiments had tried in vain to hold the mountain.

The Prussians succeeded in taking the heights (Kirchberg, Osnert, Heiligenberg) near Uettingen, which dominated the village and the road to Würzburg, after the Bavarians had cleared the Heiligenberg.

An artillery duel took place in the center, although the Prussians were only able to make progress after the two flanking mountains had been captured. Around 10 o'clock the Bavarians vacated their position at Roßbrunn and took up a new position on the Hettstadt plateau.

== Cavalry battle at the Hettstädter Höfe ==
Prussian cavalry under Colonel Thassilo von Nidda explored the terrain, with a smaller unit coming into battle with Bavarian cavalry. In the pursuit of the Bavarians, the unit came under Bavarian infantry fire and suffered considerable losses. Colonel Nidda made a new attack with his whole brigade of eight squadrons and initially threw back the Bavarian cavalry. Thereupon the Bavarians threw four cavalry regiments, three Cuirassier and one Uhlan, into the battle and put the Prussians to flight. The last battle ended with a victory for Bavaria.

== Legacy ==
Several memorials for the fallen soldiers of the Prussian regiments and the Bavarian 4th Division were erected in the Uettingen cemetery

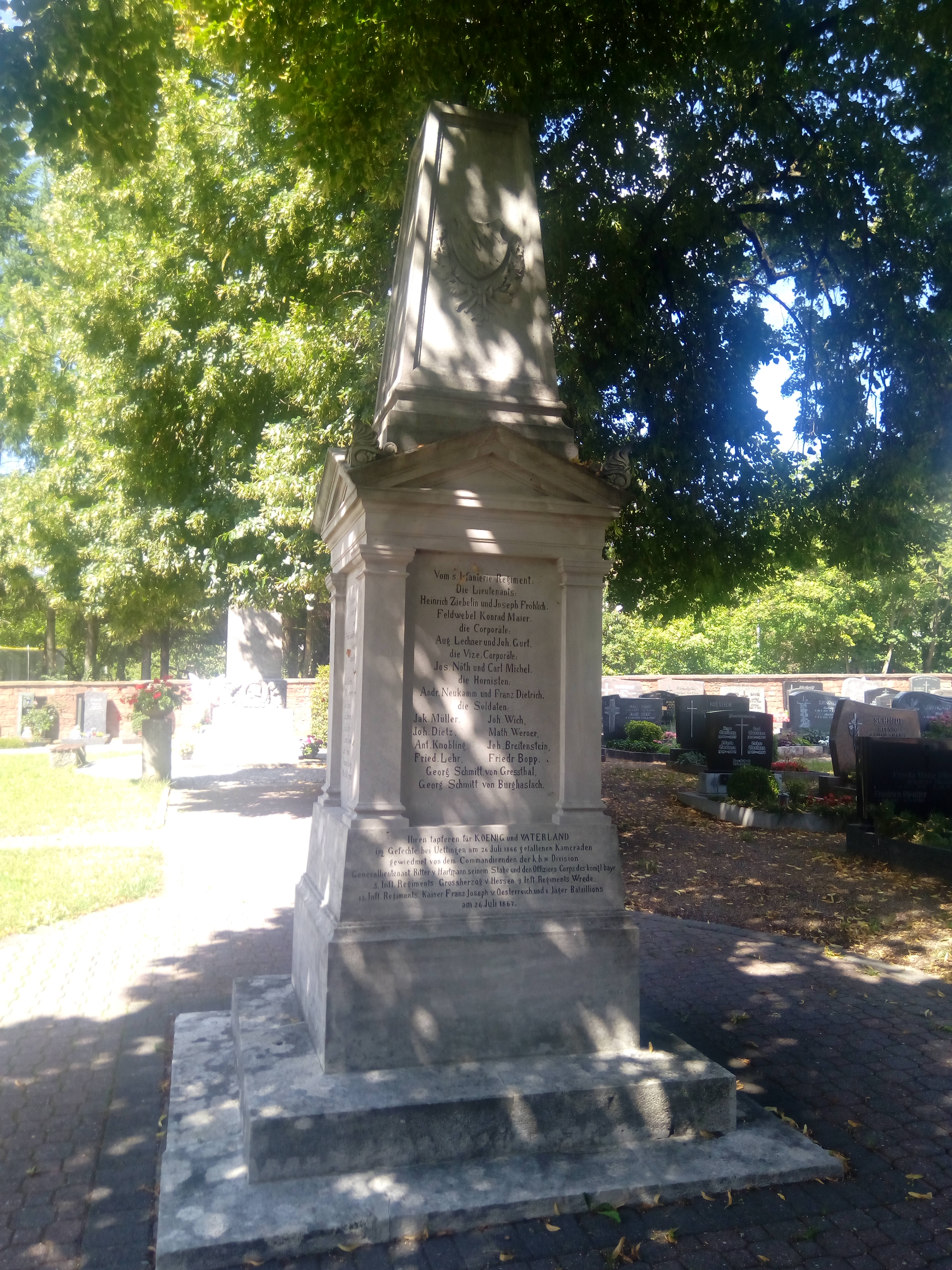
Memorial for the fallen of the 5th Royal Bavarian Infantry Regiment and the 8th Royal Bavarian Jäger Battalion

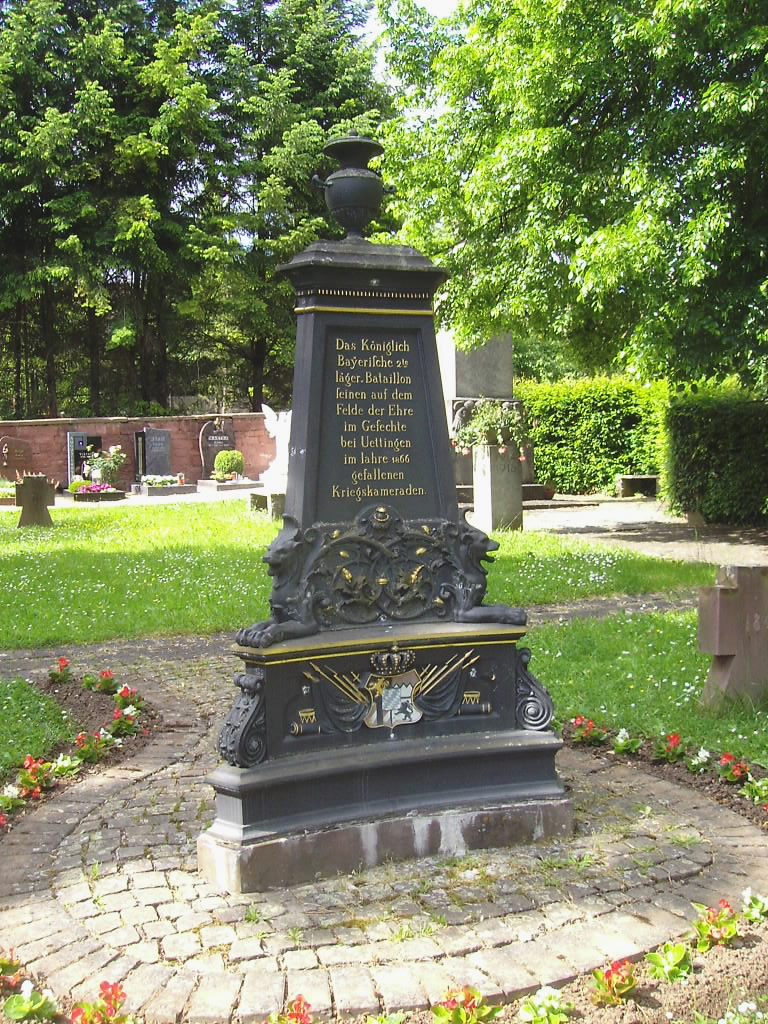
Memorial for the fallen soldiers of the Bavarian 2nd Jäger Battalion in the cemetery in Uettingen

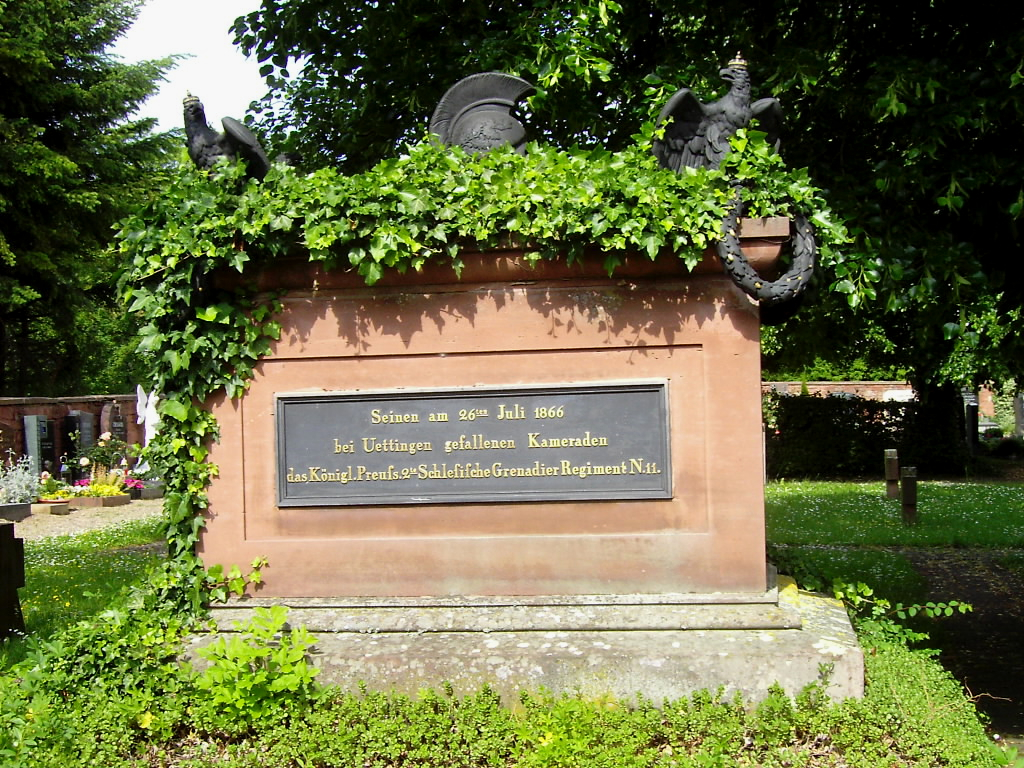
Memorial for the fallen soldiers of the Prussian 11th (2nd Silesian) Grenadier Regiment in the Uettingen cemetery

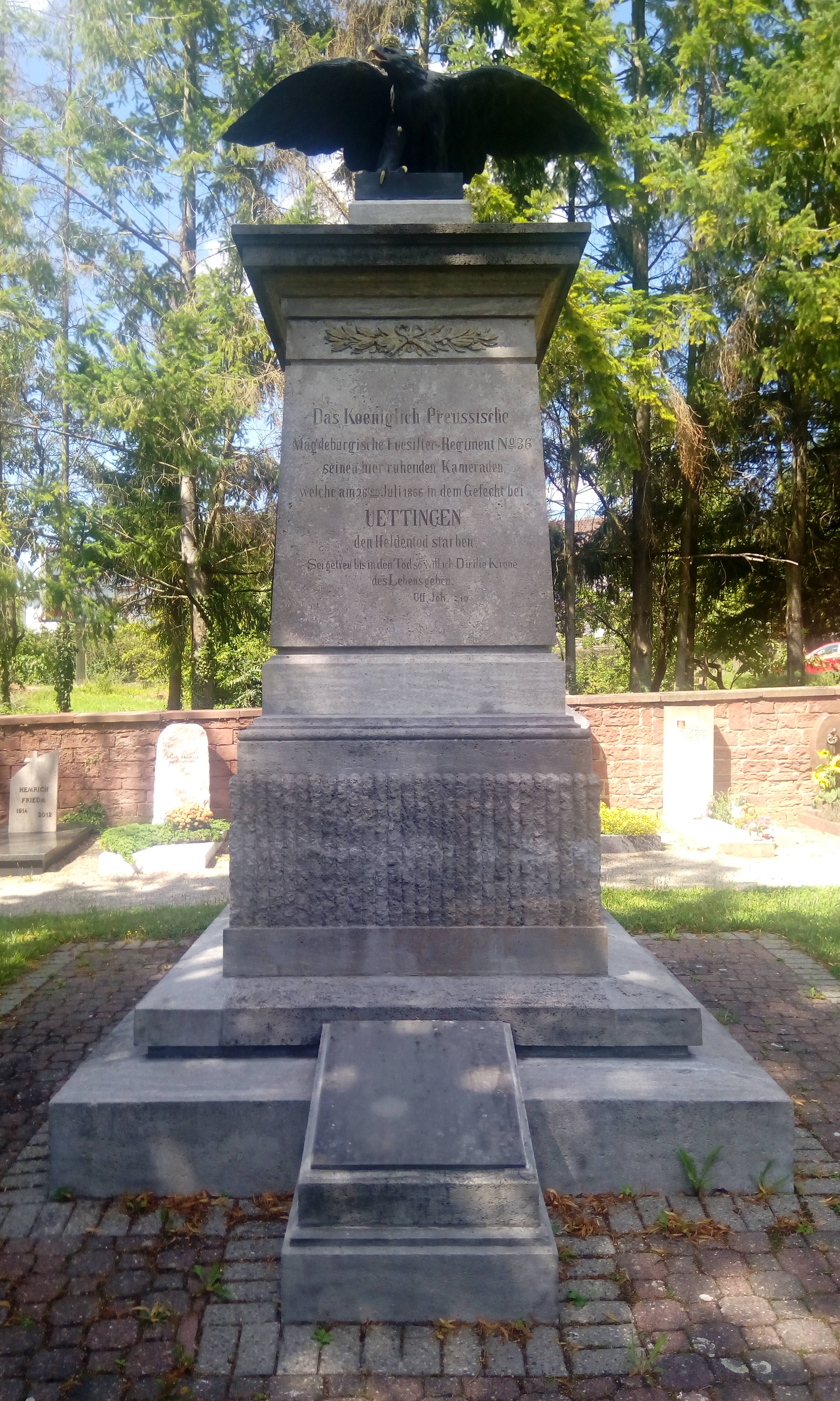
Memorial to the fallen soldiers of the 36th (Magdeburg) Fusilier Regimentat the Uettingen cemetery

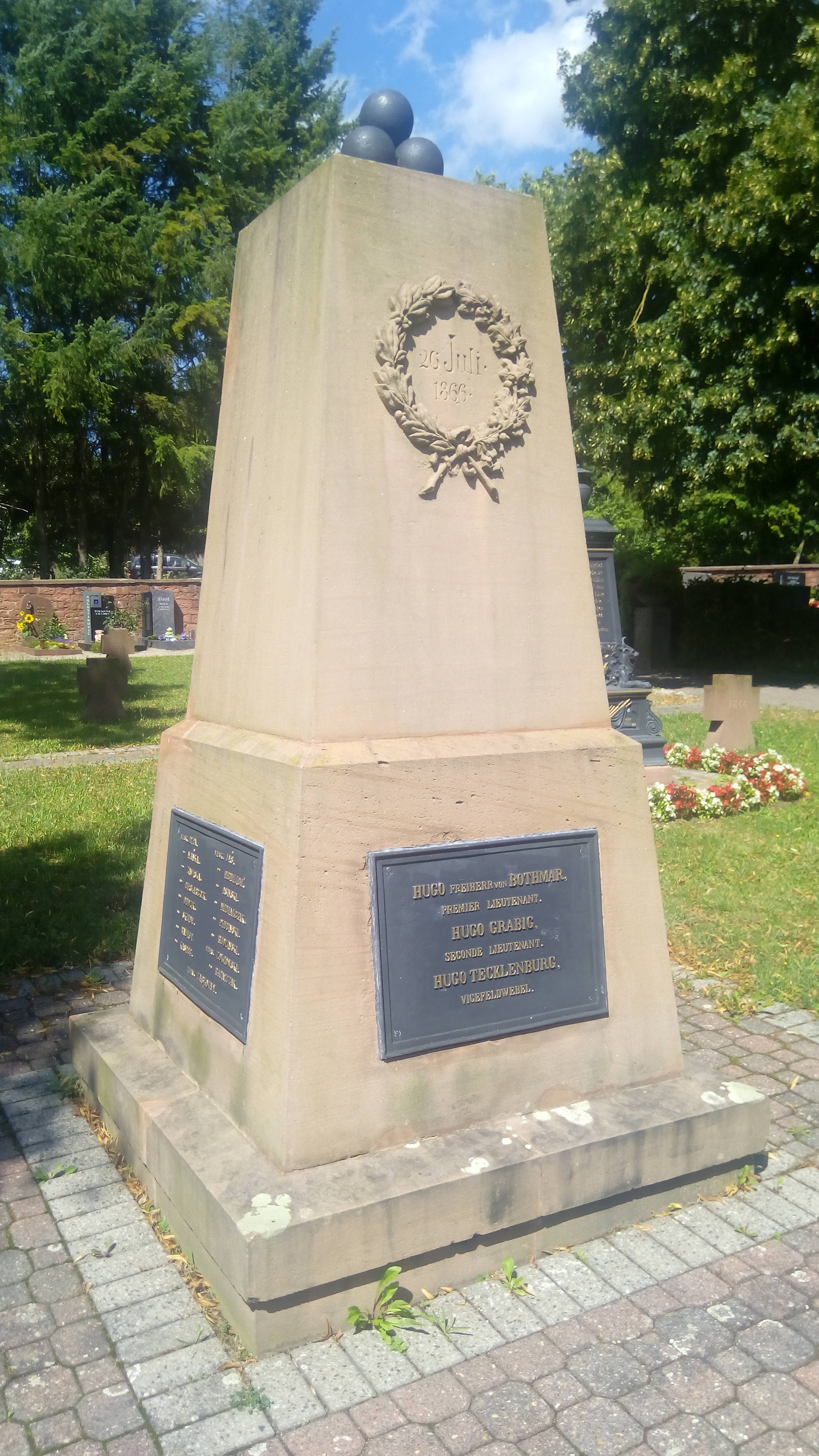
Memorial to the fallen soldiers of the 59th (4th Posen) Infantry Regiment at the Uettingen cemetery

For the fallen soldiers of the royal Bavarian infantry regiments 4, 7 and 10, a memorial in the shape of a cross was erected on the Vogelsberg south of Roßbrunn.

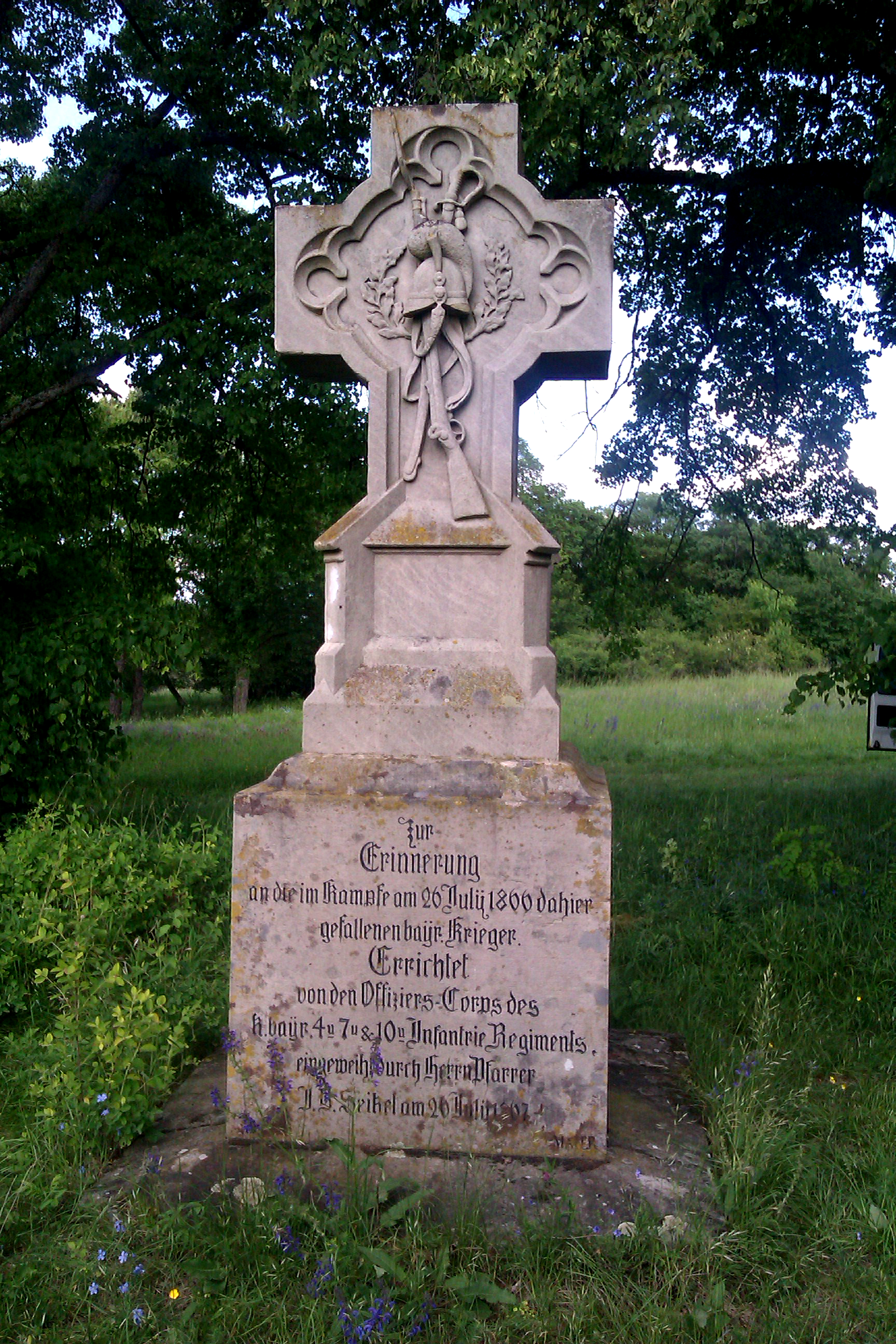
Memorial for the fallen soldiers of the Bavarian infantry regiments 4, 7 and 10 on the Vogelsberg near Roßbrunn

== Literature ==
- Österreichs Kämpfe im Jahre 1866. Vom K.und K. Generalstab. Bureau für Kriegsgeschichte, 5. Band, Wien 1869, S. 163–170. online in der Google-Buchsuche
- Der Feldzug von 1866 in Deutschland. Kriegsgeschichtliche Abteilung des großen Generalstabes, Berlin 1867, S. 676–687. online in der Google-Buchsuche
- Antheil der königlich bayerischen Armee am Kriege des Jahres 1866. bearbeitet vom Generalquartiermeister-Stabe, München 1868, S. 177–199. online in der Google-Buchsuche
- August Mels: Von der Elbe bis zur Tauber. Der Feldzug der Preußischen Main-Armee im Sommer 1866. Vom Berichterstatter des Daheim. Mit Karten und vielen Illustrationen. Velhagen & Klasing, Bielefeld & Leipzig 1867, S. 251–263. online in der Google-Buchsuche
- Theodor Fontane: Der deutsche Krieg von 1866. 2. Band: Der Feldzug in West- und Mitteldeutschland. Berlin 1871. S. 235–254. online in der Google-Buchsuche
- Emil Knorr: Der Feldzug des Jahres 1866 in West- und Süddeutschland nach authentischen Quellen bearbeitet. 3. Band, Hamburg 1870, S. 230–266. online bei der Bayerischen Staatsbibliothek
