= Hettstadt (Verwaltungsgemeinschaft) =

- Verwaltungsgemeinschaft
- Location of Hettstadt within Würzburg district
- Interactive map of Hettstadt
- Location within Germany Location within Bavaria
- Coordinates: 49°48′N 9°49′E
- Country: Germany
- State: Bavaria
- Admin. region: Lower Franconia
- District: Würzburg
- Seat: Hettstadt
- Subdivisions: 2 municipalities

Area
  - Total: 31.58 km^{2} (12.19 sq mi)

Population (2025-12-31)
  - Total: 5,197
  - Density: 164.6/km^{2} (426.2/sq mi)
- Time zone: UTC+01:00 (CET)
  - Summer (DST): UTC+02:00 (CEST)
- Website: www.vgem-hettstadt.de

Hettstadt is a Verwaltungsgemeinschaft (municipal association) in the district of Würzburg in Bavaria, Germany. Its seat is in Hettstadt.

It consists of the following municipalities:

1. Greußenheim
2. Hettstadt
