= Gustav Friedrich von Beyer =

Prussian general (1812–1889)

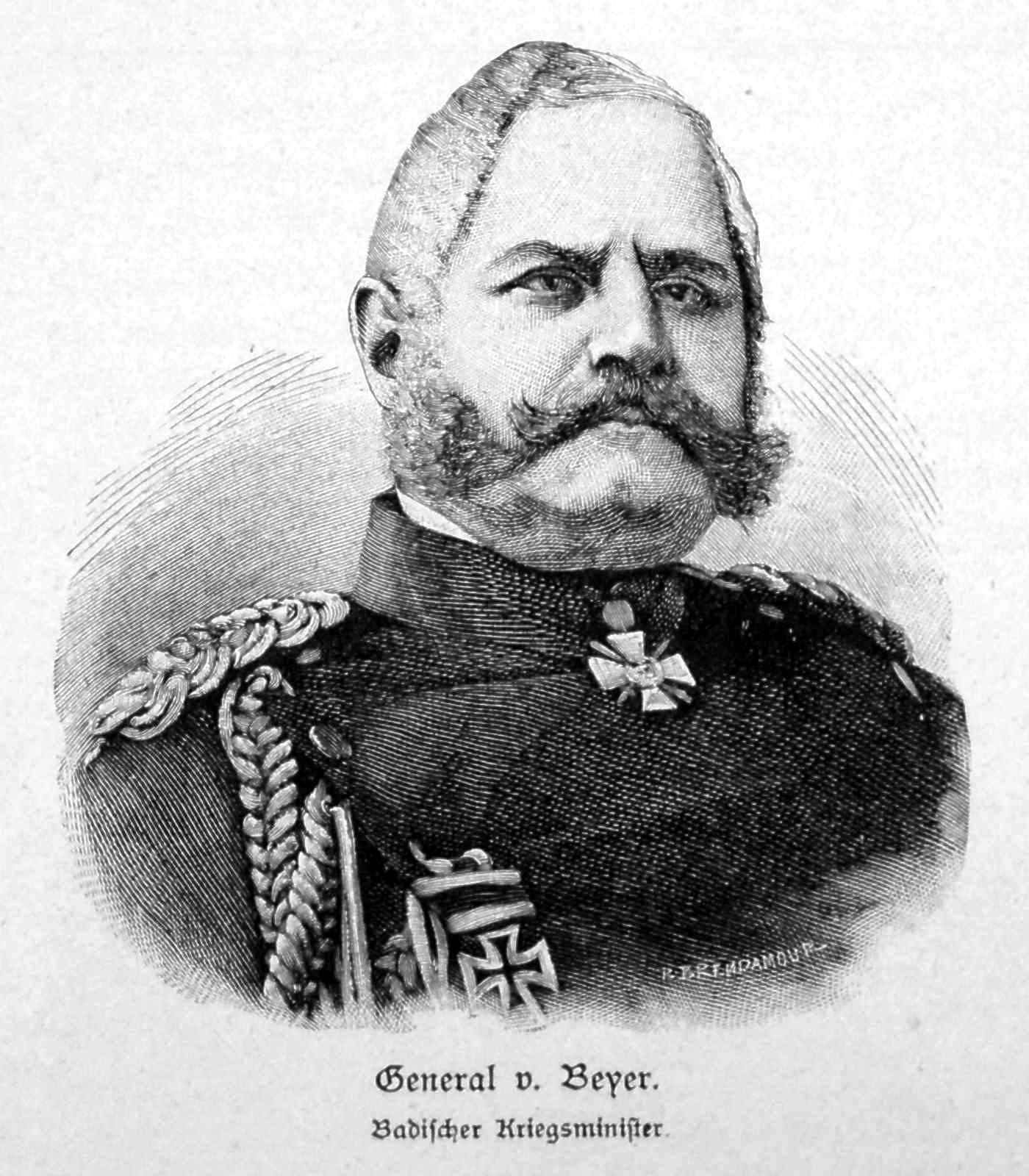
- Born: Gustav Friedrich Beyer; 26 February 1812; Berlin, Prussia
- Died: 7 December 1889 (aged 77); Leipzig, German Empire
- Military career
- Allegiance: Prussia; Baden; German Empire
- Branch: Prussian Army (Grand Duchy of Baden) Baden Army; Imperial German Army
- Service years: 1829−1880
- Rank: General of the Infantry
- Commands: 31st Infantry Regiment; Minister of War of Baden; Baden Field Division
- Conflicts: Austro-Prussian War: Battle of Langensalza; Battle of Kissingen; Battle of Werbach; Battle of Helmstadt; Battle of Roßbrunn; Franco-Prussian War: Battle of Wörth; Siege of Strasbourg; Battle of Ognon; Battle of Gray; Battle of Dijon

Gustav Friedrich Beyer (von Beyer since 1859; born 26 February 1812 in Berlin; died 7 December 1889 in Leipzig) was a Prussian general and war minister of the Grand Duchy of Baden.

== Biography ==
Beyer was the son of a Prussian government official (Privy Councilor). He was also the older brother of the future mayor of Potsdam, Alexander Beyer. He joined the Prussian Army in April 1829. From 1835 to 1838 he attended the General War School as a second lieutenant, and in 1846 was promoted to first lieutenant; taking part in the suppression of the Baden Revolution in 1849.

== Orders and decorations ==
- Kingdom of Hanover: Knight of the Royal Guelphic Order, 1858
- Grand Duchy of Hesse: Commander of the Grand Ducal Hessian Order of Ludwig, 2nd Class, 22 October 1861
- Kingdom of Prussia:
  - Knight of the Order of the Red Eagle, 2nd Class with Star, Oak Leaves and Swords, 1866; Grand Cross with Swords on Ring, 9 July 1875
  - Iron Cross (1870), 1st Class
  - Grand Commander's Cross of the Royal House Order of Hohenzollern, with Star, 11 December 1880
  - Service Award Cross
- Baden:
  - Grand Cross of the Order of the Zähringer Lion, 1868; with Swords and Golden Collar, 1879
  - Commander of the Military Karl-Friedrich Merit Order, 1870
  - Service Cross, 1st Class
- Russian Empire:
  - Knight of the Imperial Order of Saint Anna, 2nd Class
  - Knight of the Imperial Order of Saint Stanislaus, 2nd Class

== Literature ==
- L. Löhlein: Gustav Friedrich v. Beyer. In: Friedrich von Weech (Ed.): Badische Biographien. First Part, Heidelberg 1875, pp. 82–83 (online in the Baden State Library) .
- Gustav Friedrich von Beyer. (To Part I, p. 82 ff.) In: Friedrich von Weech (Ed.): Badische Biographien. Fourth Part, Karlsruhe 1891, p. 524 (online in the Baden State Library) .
- Kurt von Priesdorff : Soldier leadership. Volume 7, Hanseatische Verlagsanstalt Hamburg, undated [Hamburg], undated [1939], DNB 367632829, pp. 330–332, no. 2320.
- Wolfgang Schütz: Koblenz heads. People from the city's history - namesake for streets and squares. 2. revised and exp. Edition. Publishing house for advertising papers, Mülheim-Kärlich 2005.

Preceded by Damian Ludwig	Minister of War of the Grand Duchy of Baden; 13 February 1868 − 29 June 1871	Succeeded by Position abolished
