= Eduard von Flies =

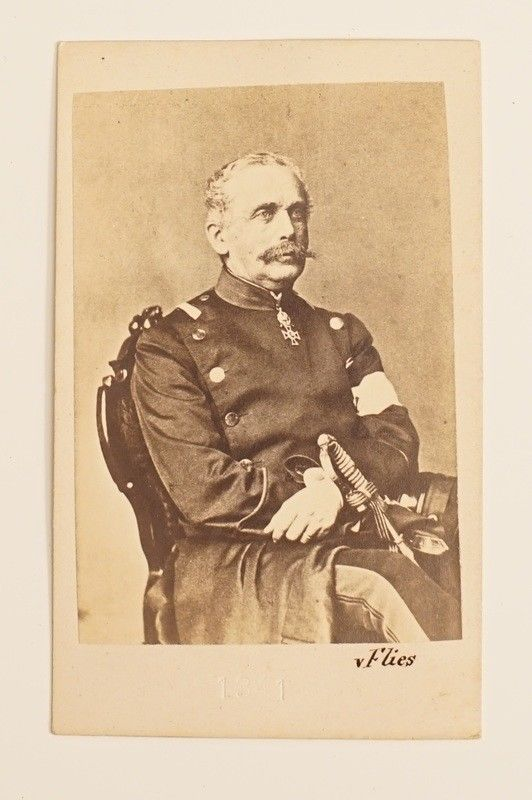
- Born: 25 August 1802; Charlottenburg, Province of Brandenburg, Prussia
- Died: 10 December 1886 (aged 84); Wiesbaden, Province of Hesse-Nassau, Prussia, German Empire
- Military career
- Allegiance: Prussia
- Branch: Prussian Army
- Service years: 1820–1868
- Rank: Lieutenant General
- Unit: Zieten Hussars
- Commands: 2nd Life Hussar Regiment; 6th Cavalry Brigade; Combined Division von Flies
- Conflicts: Second Schleswig War; Austro-Prussian War: Battle of Langensalza; Battle of Hundheim; Battle of Roßbrunn

Eduard Moritz Flies (1802-1886), known as von Flies since 1864, was a 19th-Century Prussian Lieutenant General that served the Second Schleswig War and Austro-Prussian War.

== Origin ==
Eduard Moritz was the son of Heinrich Flies (died 1842 in Freienwalde) and his wife Luise, née Wolff. His father was a retired Oberleutnant.

== Military career ==
In 1820 Flies joined the 3rd Hussar Regiment of the Prussian Army as a hussar. On 13 November 1824 he was second lieutenant and as such commanded to the teaching cadron in 1829/30. From 1834 Flies served as regimental adjutant, became Oberleutnant in May 1838 and was made a Rittmeister and squadron commander on 24 May 1841. Flies was promoted to major on 8 January 1857 and received command of the 2nd Life Hussar Regiment; being promoted to Lieutenant Colonel on 9 April 1857 and Colonel on 31 May 1859. On 20 June his rank was made À la suite of his regiment and he was entrusted with the command of the 6th Cavalry Brigade; becoming the latter's permanent commander on 12 May 1860. For his services in the troop leadership, Flies received the Order of the Red Eagle, 2nd Class with Oak Leaves on 18 October 1861, and the Order of the Crown, II Class, on 22 September 1863. Flies took part in the Second Schleswig War with his brigade in 1864. Kaiser Wilhelm I paid tribute to his services on 18 June 1864 with the elevation to the nobility. He also promoted him to major general on 25 June 1864. For his achievements the Austrians awarded Flies with the Commander's Cross of the Order of Leopold with war decoration on 21 August 1864. After the Treaty of Vienna, Flies remained in command of a combined cavalry brigade in Schleswig-Holstein.

In the Austro-Prussian War, Flies was initially the leader of the combined cavalry brigade of the Army of the Main. Here he received orders from General Edwin von Manteuffel to lead a detachment consisting of five battalions with 8150 infantrymen, 225 cavalrymen and 22 guns to Gotha via Magdeburg and Halle. He was supposed to pursue the withdrawing Hanoverians and prevent them from retreating. Despite being heavily outnumbered Flies ordered the Battle of Langensalza on 27 June 1866. Flies suffered a breakdown during the battle and lost almost 1/5th of his troops. The battle ended with a victory for the Hanoverians, but at this point they were surrounded by Prussian troops and, due to the supply situation, were no longer able to continue fighting. Historian Robert M. Citino considered the battle "one of the senseless frontal attacks in military history".

Flies went on to defeat the Badenians at the Battle of Hundheim; his troops then quickly captured Wertheim on 24 July. Flies was the main Prussian commander at the Battle of Roßbrunn which, despite earlier successes, eventually ended in a Bavarian victory.

On 11 July 1866 Flies was appointed commander of a division formed from the troops in the Elbe duchies. After the end of the war, he was appointed commander at Altona on 15 September 1866. Flies was retired on 7 January 1868 and awarded the 1st Class of the Order of the Red Eagle with oak leaves and swords on rings.

In addition to his pension, from 2 February 1870 onwards he received an annual bonus of 500 thalers.

== Family ==
Flies married Therese von Schönfeld (born 27 April 1811 in Grimma; died 13 May 1882 in Wiesbaden) in Düben on 27 September 1832. Their daughter Lucie Luise Therese (born 11 January 1834 in Düben) emerged from the marriage. On 18 December 1873 she married Post Director, and retired Lieutenant Colonel, Otto von Wichmann.
