= Battle of Langensalza (1866) =

1866 battle in the Austro-Prussian war

- Part of the Austro-Prussian War
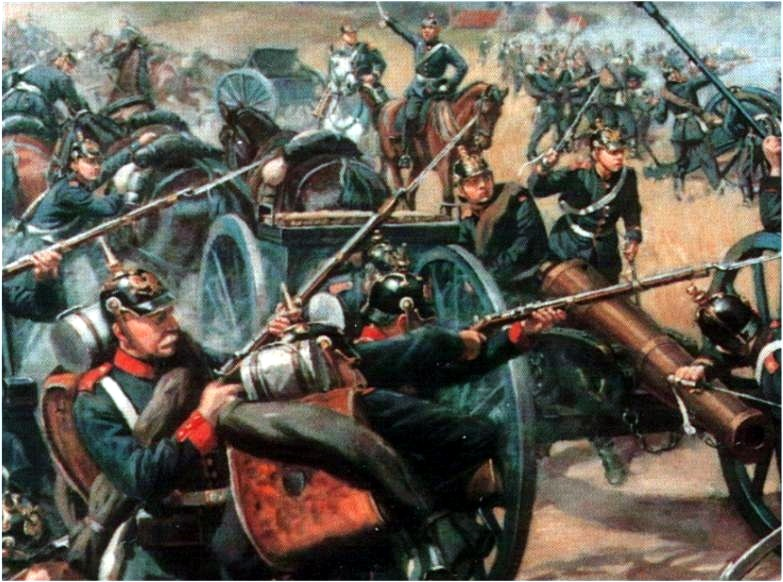
- Prussian artillery being attacked, painting by Georg von Boddien
Date	27 June 1866
Location	Langensalza, Province of Saxony, Prussia
Result	Hanoverian victory (Note: Despite losing the battle the Prussians had succeeded in their wider aims. The battle itself, recovering from it and the continuing doubts about the position and strength of the Prussians all combined to pin the Hanoverians in place. Giving the Prussians the time to amass sufficient forces to force the Hanoverians to surrender.)

Belligerents
Prussia; Saxe-Coburg and Gotha	Hanover; Bavaria

Commanders and leaders
(Kingdom of Prussia) Helmuth von Moltke (Theater commander) (Kingdom of Prussia) Eduard Vogel von Falckenstein (Kingdom of Prussia) Gustav Beyer (Kingdom of Prussia) Eduard von Flies	(Kingdom of Hanover) George V (Kingdom of Hanover) Alexander von Arentschildt

Strength
9,000	19,000

Casualties and losses
170 killed (11 officers); 643 wounded (30 officers); 33 missing 907 captured (10 officers)	378 killed 1,051 wounded

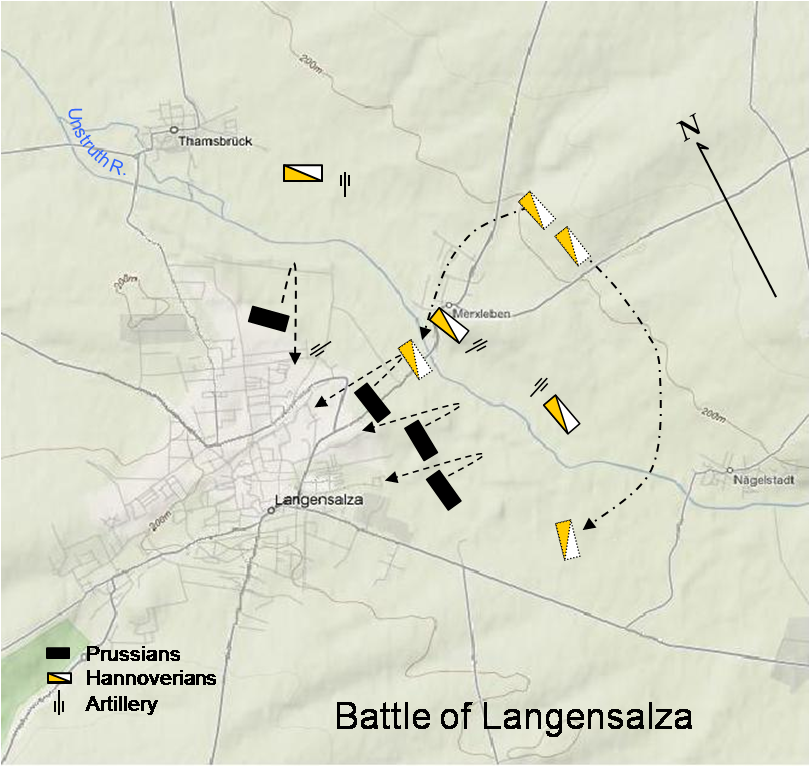
Regimental movement at Langensalza, 1866.

The Battle of Langensalza was fought on 27 June 1866, during the Austro-Prussian War, near Bad Langensalza in what is now modern Germany, between the Kingdom of Hanover and the Kingdom of Prussia. The Hanoverians won the battle but were then surrounded by a larger and reinforced Prussian army. Unable to link up with their Bavarian allies to the south, the Hanoverians surrendered.

That marked the demise of the Royal Hanoverian Army and the annexation of Hanover into the burgeoning Prussia, which systematically unified Germany into the modern nation state.

== Background ==
After declaring that he felt "trapped, like a fox indoors... [with] no choice but to bite my way out," the Kingdom of Prussia's Wilhelm I initiated the Austro-Prussian War to conquer and unite a majority of the German principalities. Many small German states existed prior to 1866; in anticipation of war, they allied themselves with either Austria or Prussia depending on their desires and goals. Most kingdoms surrounding Prussia allied with Austria for fear of losing their autonomy to Prussia. As a result, Prussia was geographically isolated. Prussia was boxed against the Baltic Sea, which prompted Wilhelm to make that statement. King George V of Hanover believed he could negotiate independently with the Austrians and Prussians, which wasted time that could have been used to strengthen his forces by joining other German states. When he finally attempted to do so, it was too late. In a show of Hanover's naïveté, George's Foreign Minister declared that Bismarck would never break the law that insisted on maintaining a six-week interval before invading another land. On 15 June 1866, Wilhelm ordered Hanover, Saxony and Kassel to disarm at once, effectively beginning the war with Austria’s allies. On 16 June, Prussian forces began moving against all three German states, with those of General August Karl von Goeben approaching Hanover.

== Battle ==
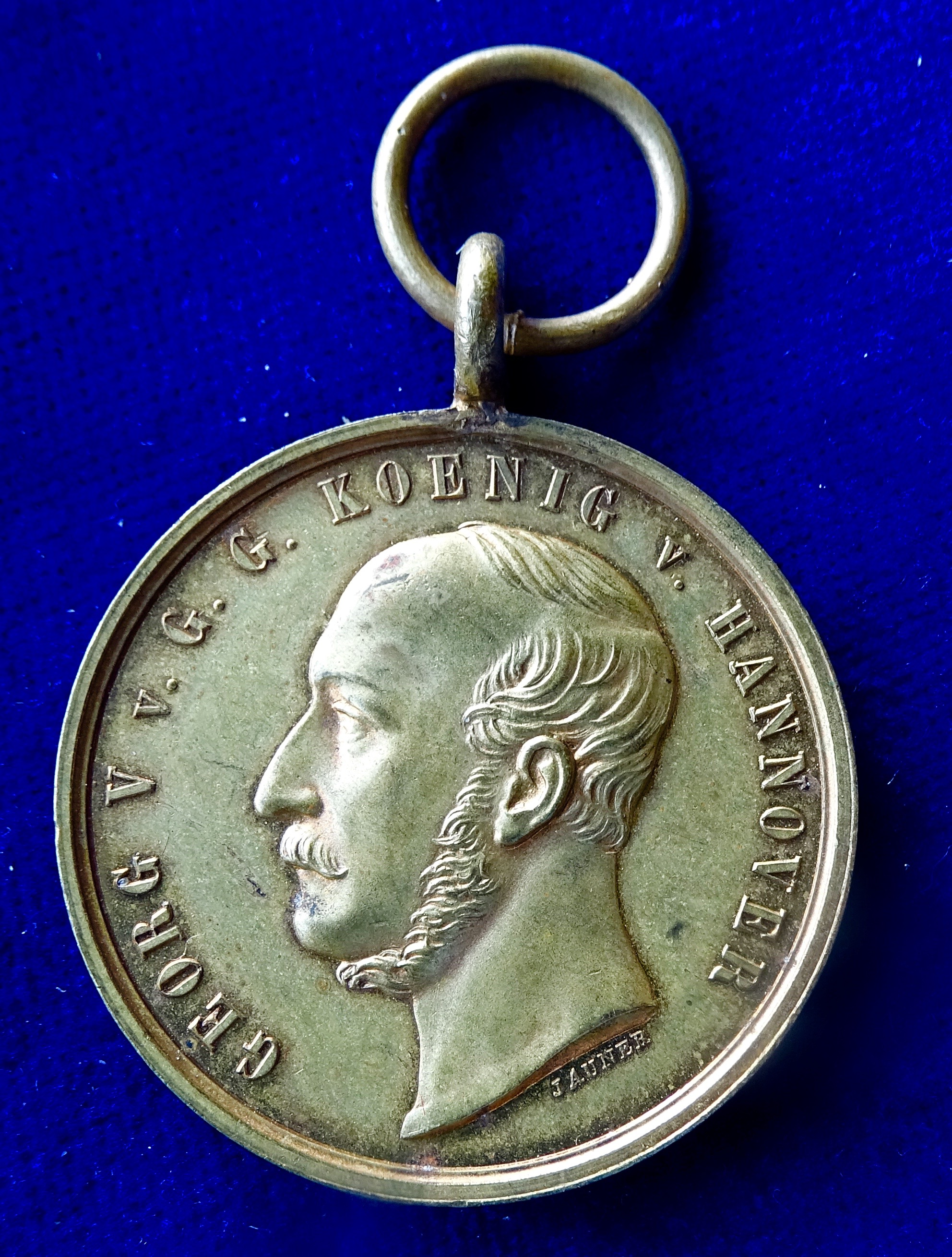
Battle of Langensalza (1866) Hanoverian Medal, awarded by King George V to his troops fighting in that battle. Obverse.

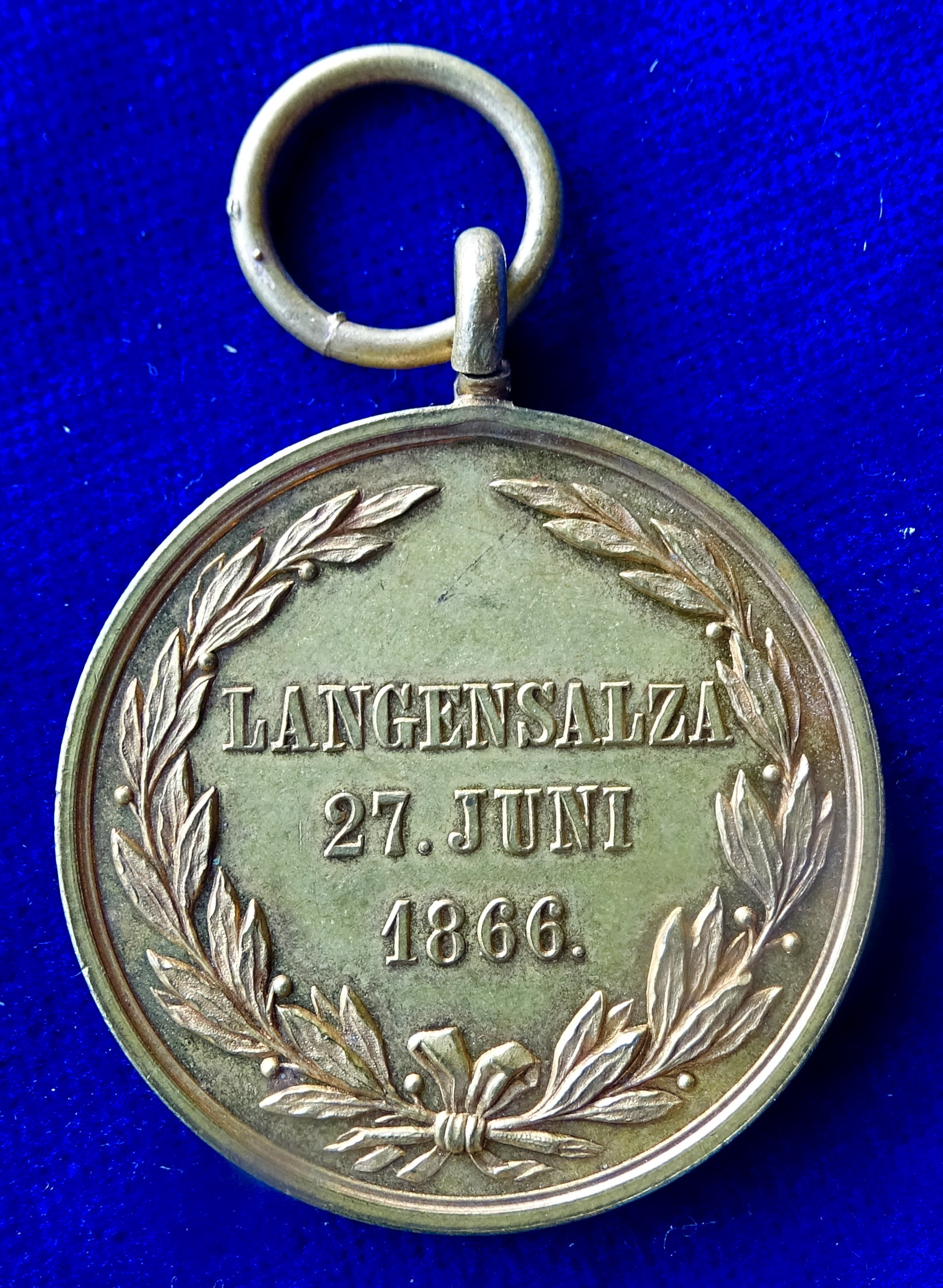
Battle of Langensalza (1866) Hanoverian Medal, reverse.

Hanover began in an excellent position, as the Prussian attack happened to occur during Hanoverian summer exercises, and its army was already mobilised. Realising the vast size of the total Prussian force, George directed his 19,000 man army under General Alexander von Arentschildt to withdraw quickly and to march south to link up with Bavarian allies. Prussia pressed 40,000 total troops into Hanover, which then split into four detachments under Generals Falckenstein, Goeben, Flies, and Beyer. Falckenstein, recognizing the absence of an army to fight, marched unopposed into the Hanoverian capital, north of the marching Hanoverians. General Helmuth von Moltke, the Prussian commander, also ordered Goeben to the north and, in turn, deployed Beyer to the Hanoverians' south, and Flies, with 9,000 troops, quickly marched around to the west. That formed a box around the Hanoverian army, with Prussia itself forming the Eastern side.

Moltke ordered Flies to hold fast and to intercept Hanoverians trying to break through westward as Falckenstein's force performed the main Prussian assault from the north. In direct defiance of his orders, Flies gathered his detachment and directly attacked the Hanoverian army. Following a feint toward Thamsbruck to the North, the Prussian forces under Flies made a concentrated assault toward Merxleben. The much larger Hanoverian force and artillery fire drove them back toward the actual city of Langensalza. Having a force more than twice the Prussian detachment's size, Arentschildt severely routed Flies's troops, capturing more than 900 men.

Although the Hanoverians attained a decisive victory in the actual battle, the fighting halted their movement and allowed the other Prussian forces from the north and the south to converge on the battle site. Out of options, George and the Hanoverians pulled back to the east, which was farther from their Bavarian allies. Pinned down against the Harz Mountains and out of options, George surrendered in Nordhausen two days after the battle.

== Aftermath ==
The battle was nearly a disaster for the Prussians in the Hanoverian campaign. It wiped out Flies's detachment of troops and could have allowed an avenue of escape for the Hanoverian army. At the same time, the battle provided just enough time for the northern and southern Prussian contingents to link up at the battle site, which ultimately forced the Hanoverian surrender.

Langensalza was an important aspect of the Austro-Prussian War by leading to a quick Prussian occupation of Hanover, both taking the Austrians by surprise and greatly weakening the Austrians' position in the war. The Prussians also quickly overran Kassel and Saxony while they were attacking Hanover. Altogether, the small states could have contributed more than 100,000 good troops to Austria’s cause, but they were destroyed before they could unite and fight together. If the Hanoverians had successfully reached other allies on the Austrian's side, the Austro-Prussian War may have gone very differently.

Another lasting result of the battle is the use of the Red Cross by medical personnel. Created by the First Geneva Convention in 1864, the Red Cross began an international humanitarian aid group. The organisation, which would later greatly expand in size, was originally very small. Involving just 30 trained volunteer nurses from Gotha, the first actual combat mission of the Red Cross occurred on the Prussian side at Langensalza. Although Austria and Hanover were not involved in 1866, Prussia was already a member of the Red Cross Convention. Prussian medical personnel worked on the battlefield, wore the sign of the Red Cross on their arms and provided critical aid to wounded soldiers. Its legacy continues today in the form of the International Red Cross.

== See also ==
- George I of Great Britain and Brunswick-Lüneburg (soon to be styled as "Elector of Hanover", after the duchy's largest city.)
- House of Wettin
- House of Windsor
- Kingdom of Hanover

== Sources ==
- Austria- Militärische Berichte, Officieller Bericht über die Kriegsereignisse zwischen Hannover und Preussen im Juni 1866 und Relation der Schlacht bei Langensalza am 27. Juni 1866 (Wien:Commissionsverlag von Carl Gerold’s Sohn, 1866).
- Arden Bucholz, Moltke and the German Wars, 1864-1871 (New York: Palgrave, 2001).
- COL. T.N. Dupuy, A Genius for War: The German Army and General Staff, 1807-1945 (Fairfax: Hero Books, 1984).
- Friedjung, Heinrich (1897). The Struggle for Supremacy in Germany 1859-1866. New York: Russell & Russell.
- COL. G. B. Malleson, The Refounding of the German Empire, 1848-1871 (London: Seeley & Co., 1904).
- Geoffrey Wawro, The Austro-Prussian War: Austria’s War with Prussia and Italy in 1866 (Cambridge: Cambridge University Press, 1996).
