= Greußenheim =

- Municipality
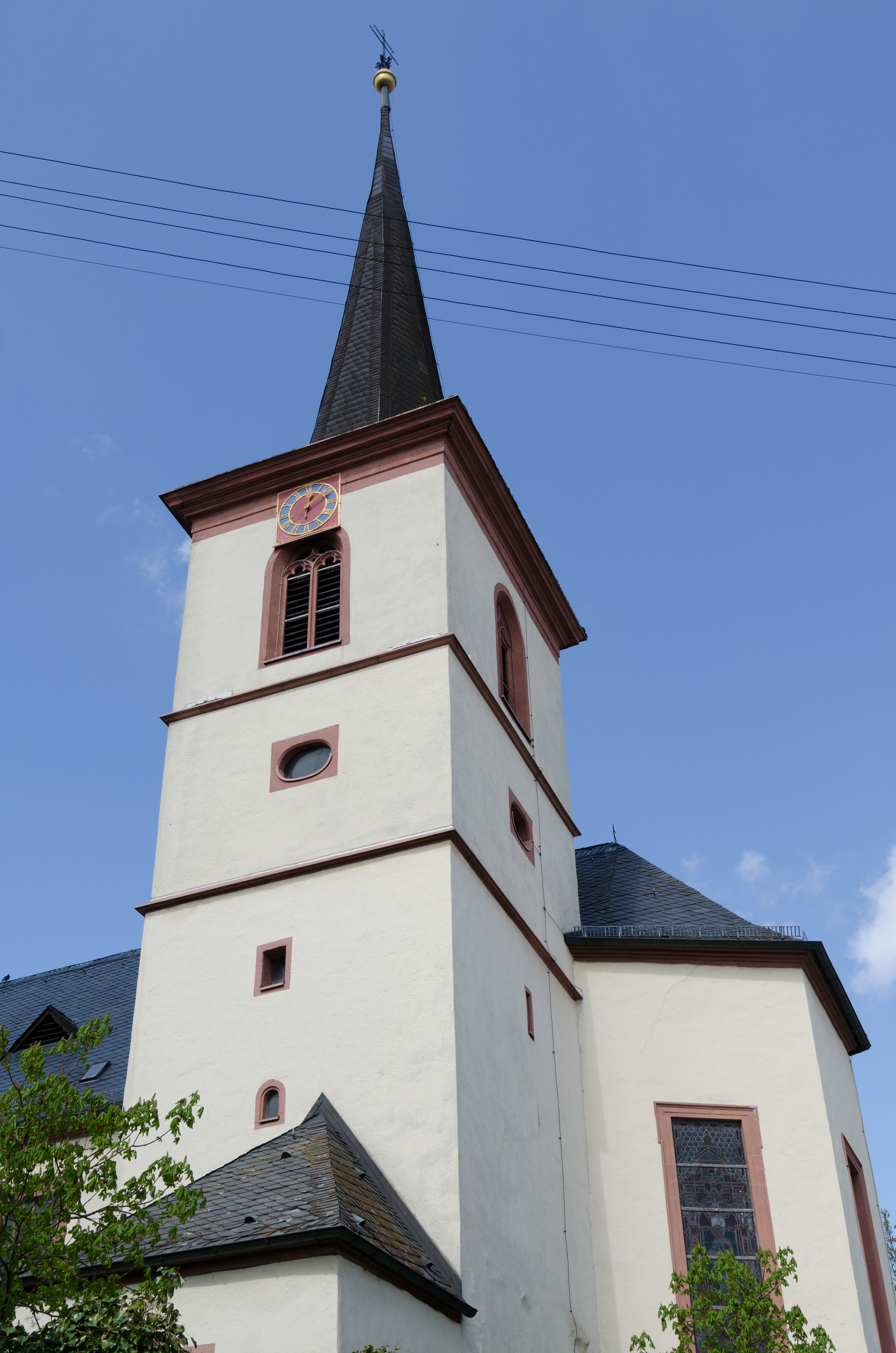
- Church of Saint Bartholomew

- Coat of arms

- Location of Greußenheim within Würzburg district
- Interactive map of Greußenheim
- Location within Germany Location within Bavaria
- Coordinates: 49°49′N 9°46′E
- Country: Germany
- State: Bavaria
- Admin. region: Unterfranken
- District: Würzburg
- Municipal assoc.: Hettstadt

Government
  - Mayor (2020–26): Karin Kuhn

Area
  - Total: 17.67 km^{2} (6.82 sq mi)
- Elevation: 259 m (850 ft)

Population (2025-12-31)
  - Total: 1,609
  - Density: 91.06/km^{2} (235.8/sq mi)
- Time zone: UTC+01:00 (CET)
  - Summer (DST): UTC+02:00 (CEST)
- Postal codes: 97259
- Dialling codes: 09369
- Vehicle registration: WÜ
- Website: www.greussenheim.de

Greußenheim is a municipality in the district of Würzburg in Bavaria, Germany.
