= Hettstadt =

- Municipality
- Coat of arms

- Location of Hettstadt within Würzburg district
- Interactive map of Hettstadt
- Location within Germany Location within Bavaria
- Coordinates: 49°48′N 9°49′E
- Country: Germany
- State: Bavaria
- Admin. region: Unterfranken
- District: Würzburg
- Municipal assoc.: Hettstadt

Government
  - Mayor (2020–26): Andrea Rothenbucher (CSU)

Area
  - Total: 13.92 km^{2} (5.37 sq mi)
- Elevation: 307 m (1,007 ft)

Population (2025-12-31)
  - Total: 3,588
  - Density: 257.8/km^{2} (667.6/sq mi)
- Time zone: UTC+01:00 (CET)
  - Summer (DST): UTC+02:00 (CEST)
- Postal codes: 97265
- Dialling codes: 0931
- Vehicle registration: WÜ
- Website: www.hettstadt.de

Hettstadt is a municipality in the district of Würzburg in Bavaria, Germany.
