= Albert Cambriels =

French military commander

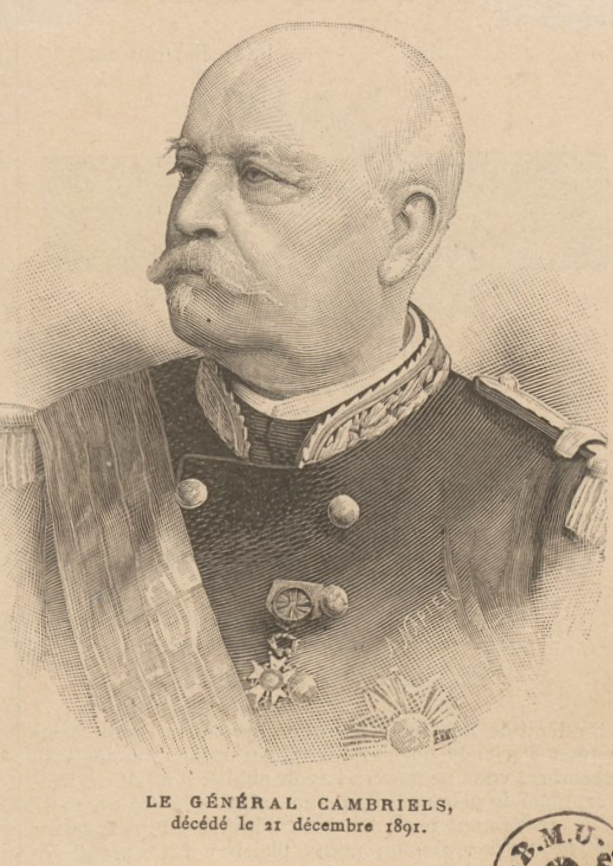
- General Cambriels
- Born: Hippolyte-Albert Cambriels; 11 August 1816; Lagrasse, Aude, France
- Died: 21 December 1891 (aged 75); Alénya, Pyrénées-Orientales, France
- Military career
- Allegiance: Bourbon Restoration; July Monarchy; French Second Republic; Second French Empire
- Branch: French Army
- Service years: 1834–1881
- Rank: Général de Division
- Commands: 84th Infantry Division; 27th Infantry Division; 10th Corps; 13th Corps
- Conflicts: Franco-Austrian War; Franco-Prussian War
- Awards: Grand Cross of the Legion of Honour

Général Hippolyte-Albert Cambriels (11 August 1816 – 21 December 1891) was a French military commander.

Born in Lagrasse, Aude, he was the son of Brigadier General Pierre Cambriels. He was educated at École spéciale militaire de Saint-Cyr. During the Franco-Prussian War, he was seriously injured at the Battle of Sedan in 1870.

He was created a Chevalier of the Legion of Honour in 1850, followed by upgrades to Officier (1856), Commandeur (1859), Grand Officier (1872), and finally Grand-Croix (1880).

He died at the Château de Boaça in Pyrénées-Orientales in 1891 and was buried at Père Lachaise Cemetery in Paris.
