= Aub =

- Town
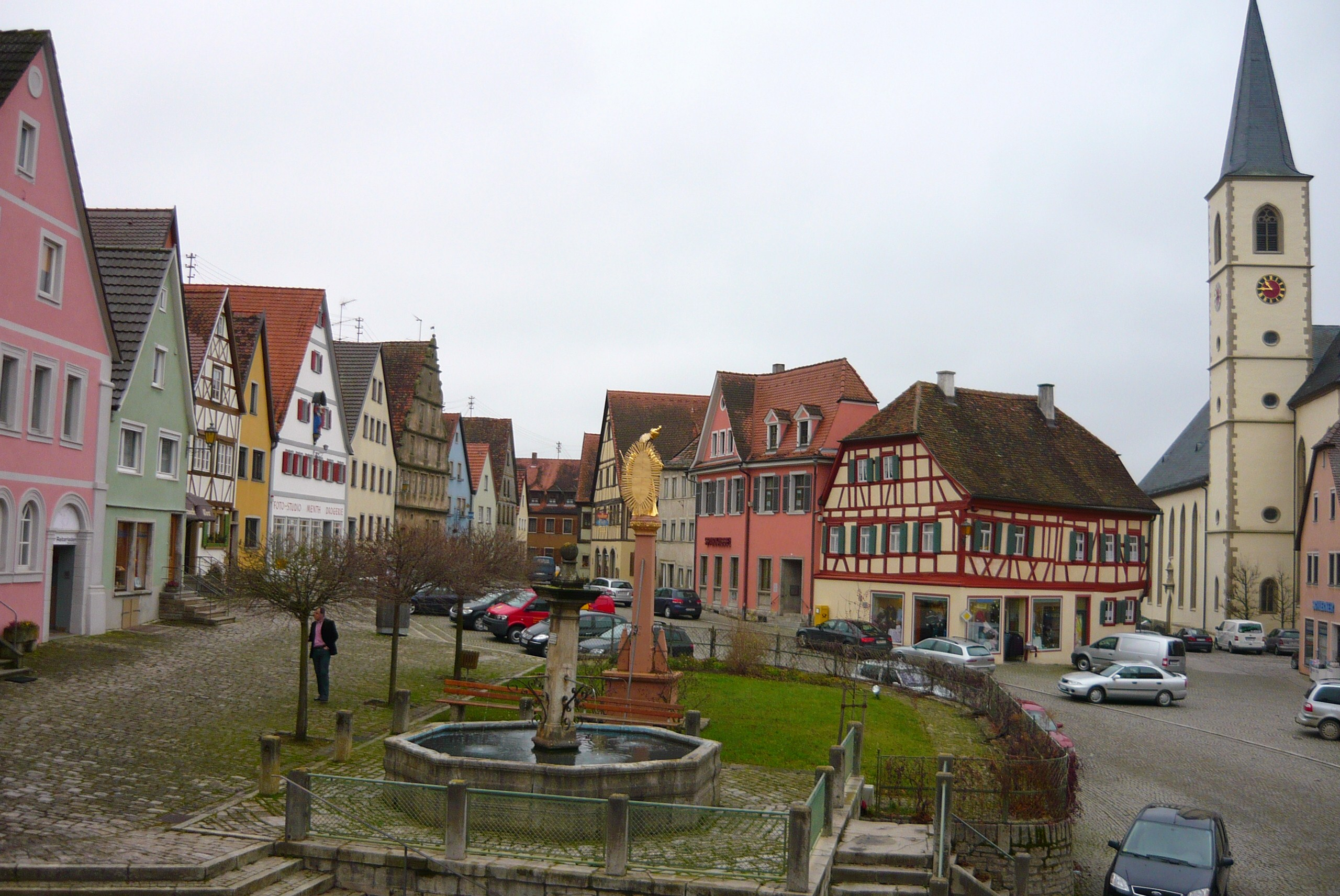
- Market square in Aub

- Coat of arms

- Location of Aub within Würzburg district
- Interactive map of Aub
- Location within Germany Location within Bavaria
- Coordinates: 49°32′N 10°03′E
- Country: Germany
- State: Bavaria
- Admin. region: Unterfranken
- District: Würzburg
- Municipal assoc.: Aub
- Subdivisions: 2 Stadtteile

Government
  - Mayor (2020–26): Roman Menth (CSU)

Area
  - Total: 17.54 km^{2} (6.77 sq mi)
- Elevation: 310 m (1,020 ft)

Population (2025-12-31)
  - Total: 1,325
  - Density: 75.54/km^{2} (195.7/sq mi)
- Time zone: UTC+01:00 (CET)
  - Summer (DST): UTC+02:00 (CEST)
- Postal codes: 97239
- Dialling codes: 09335
- Vehicle registration: WÜ
- Website: www.stadt-aub.de

Aub (German pronunciation: [aʊp]) is a town in the district of Würzburg, in Bavaria, Germany, 29 kilometres (18 mi) southeast of Würzburg and 21 kilometres (13 mi) northwest of Rothenburg ob der Tauber, near the border of Baden-Württemberg. It is fed by the river Gollach and divided into three parts: Aub, Baldersheim and Burgerroth.

== History ==
The earlier territory of the Catholic Church in Würzburg became part of Bavaria when the government was secularized in 1805. The present municipality was created during the administrative reforms of 2010.

== Population ==
The population has remained relatively stable since 1970, as shown in the following table:

Year	Population
1970	1714
1987	1631
2000	1702
2005	1608

== Administrative municipality ==
Aub forms an administrative municipality with the nearby towns of Gelchsheim and Sonderhofen.

== Sister city ==
- Wrixum, Schleswig-Holstein

== Landmarks ==
Aub has a church and a Jewish cemetery. The main church has a carved wooden altarpiece by Tilman Riemenschneider, a late medieval master sculptor in Southern Germany. The town has most of its medieval walls intact, and a small museum in the 'spittalkirche', a medieval monastery-cum-hospice, which served pilgrims and the old and infirm. The museum has objects from Aub's past, and exhibits about caring for the elderly through the centuries (all in German). Aub is the second smallest city in Bavaria.

== Notable people ==
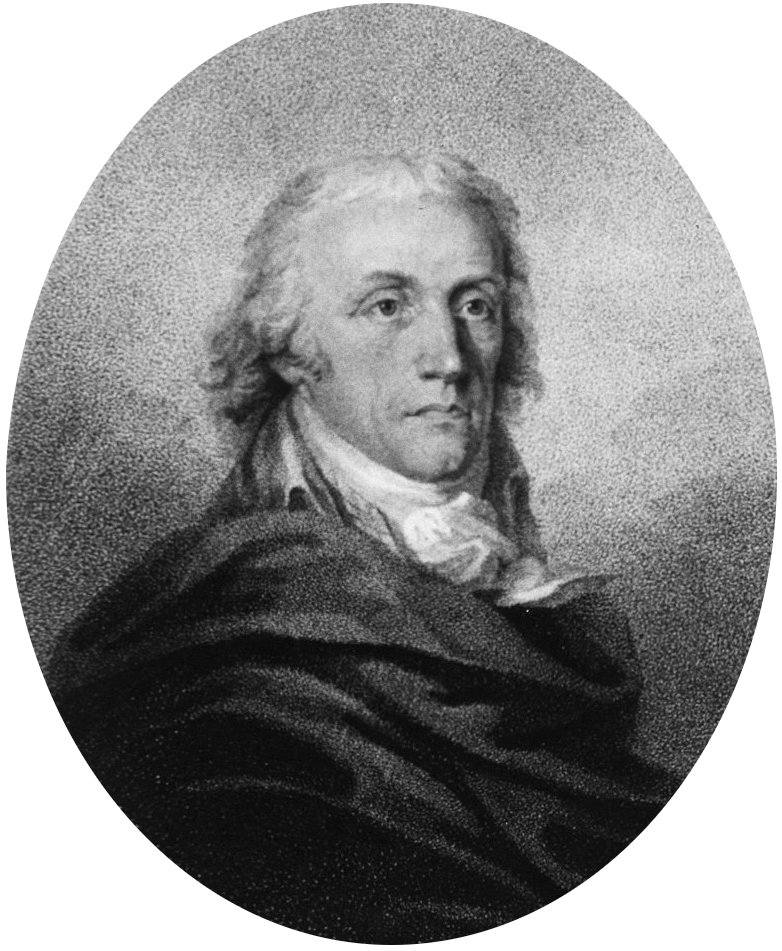
Johann Adam Schmidt

- Johann Adam Schmidt (1759–1809), doctor of Ludwig van Beethoven
- Kaspar Bausewein (1838–1903), singer at the Munich Court Opera
