= Georg Anton Urlaub =

German painter (1713–1759)

- Born: June 20, 1713; Thüngersheim, Franconia
- Died: February 20, 1759 (aged 45); Würzburg
- Education: Academy of Fine Arts Vienna; Accademia Clementina
- Known for: Frescoes and Altarpieces, Portraits
- Style: Baroque
- Movement: Baroque, Rococo

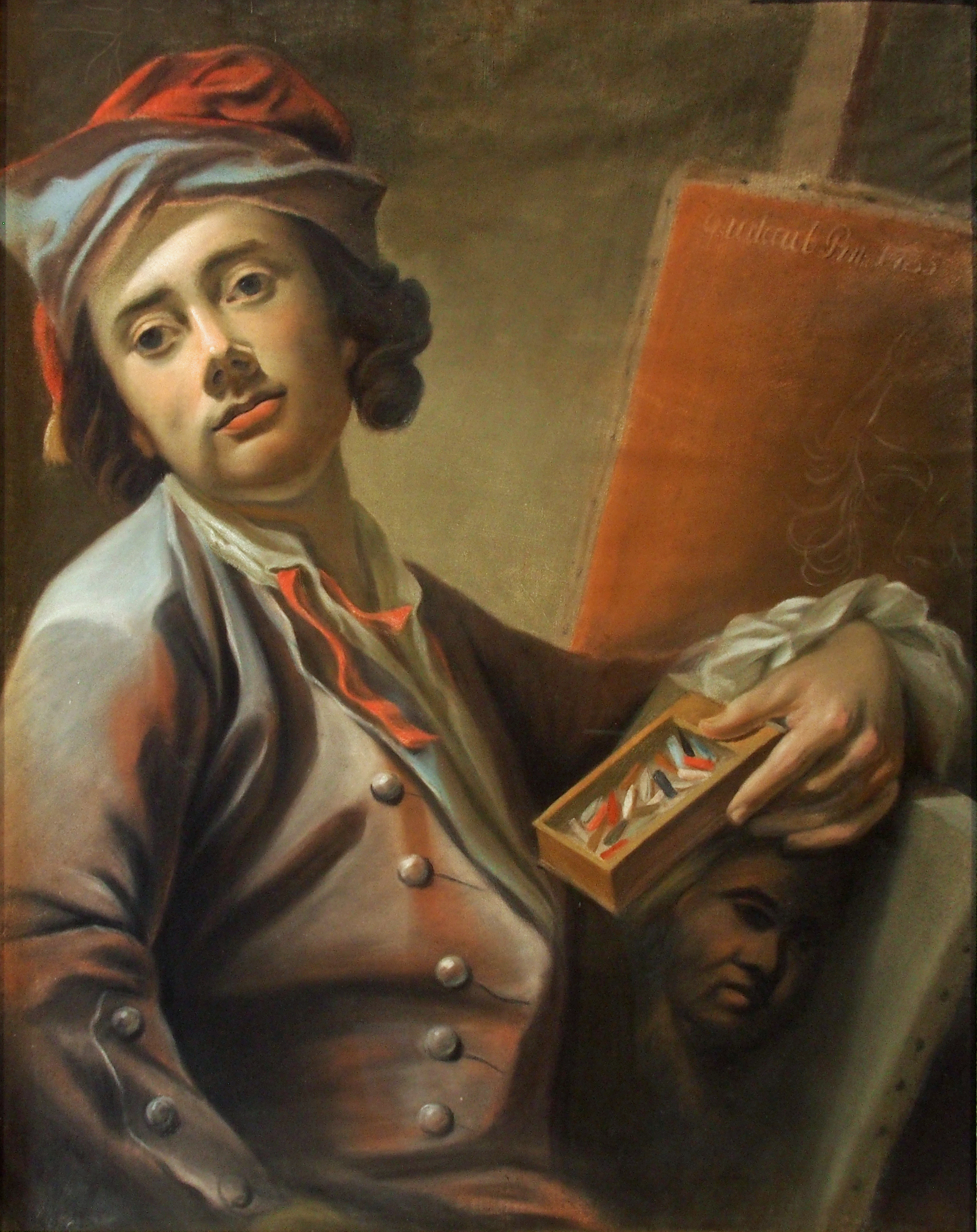
Self-portrait by Georg Anton Urlaub, 1735

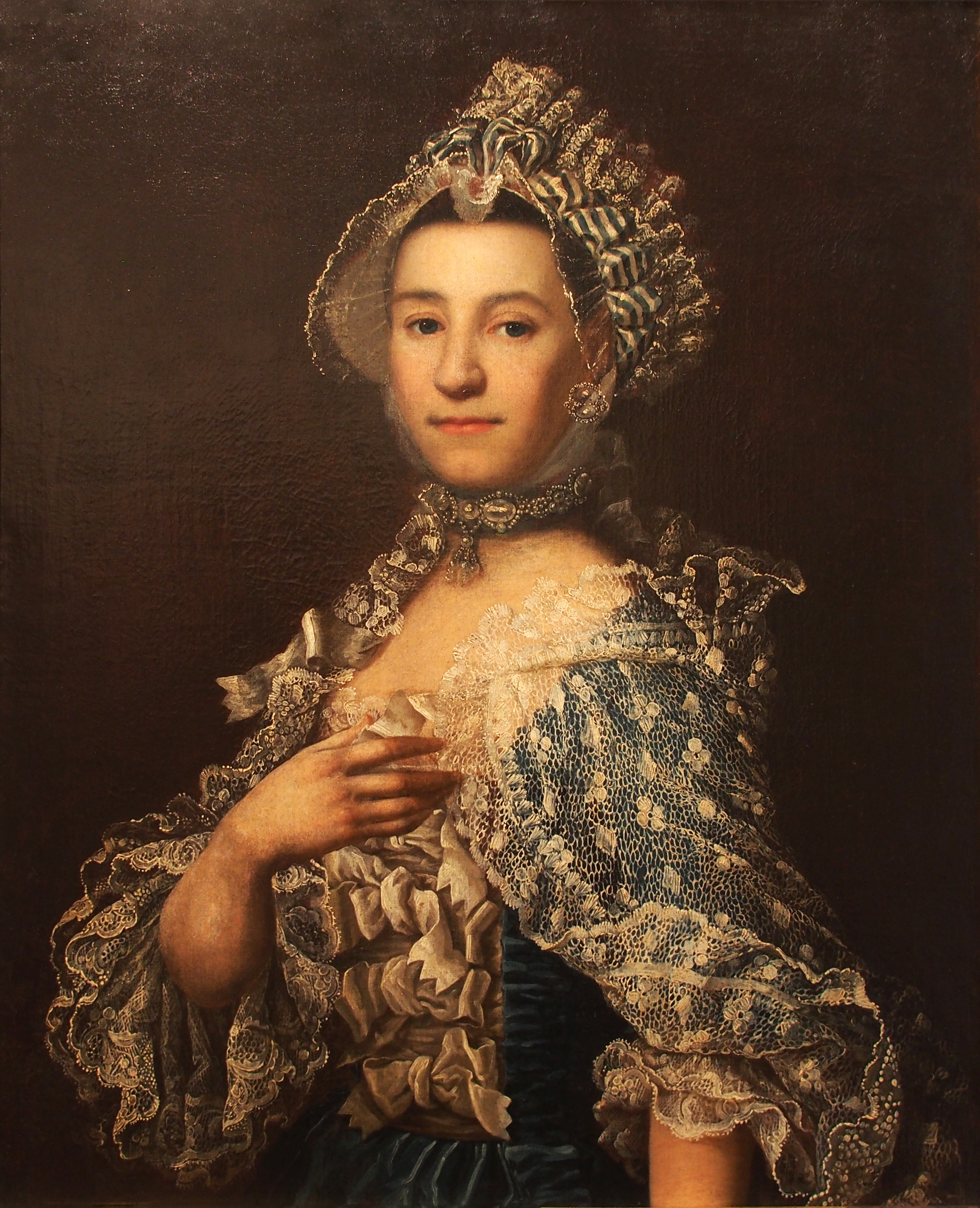
Portrait of his Wife, Maria; after his death she married the prince bishop's archivist, Johann Octavian Salver.

Georg Anton Urlaub (20 June 1713 – 20 February 1759) was a Baroque painter from Franconia. He was associated for part of his career with the court of the prince bishop of Würzburg and painted portraits and also many frescoes and altarpieces for churches in Lower Franconia.

== Early life and education ==
Georg Anton Urlaub was born in Thüngersheim, the first or second of nine children of Anna Maria Feser and Georg Sebastian Urlaub. His father and his grandfather Egidius were also painters, as were two of his brothers, Johann Georg and Georg Christian.

Beginning in 1735 he was working at the Würzburg Residence under Prince Bishop Friedrich Karl von Schönborn, probably as an assistant and student of the court painter Johann Rudolf Byss. Byss was 73 at the time and Urlaub knew that he was held in high esteem by von Schönborn, who was seeking a suitable successor for him. In 1735 Urlaub created a self-portrait in pastels, including two works in progress to display his work ethic as well as his abilities; around 1737 he painted two small allegories celebrating the prince bishop's virtues as a ruler and wishing him a long life, and also displaying his education. In autumn 1737, von Schönborn sent him to study at the Academy of Fine Arts in Vienna, apparently with an annual stipend of 200 guilders. Urlaub remained there until 1741. In 1739 he wrote to his patron complaining about the relative lack of professors for the large number of students, and asking for funds to study under the Italian painter Federico Bencovich; in February 1740 he again asked for more money, saying he wanted to hire one of the empty rooms in the Palais Schönborn on Laudongasse, and in March the prince bishop gave instructions for him to receive what he needed, but to spend the summer copying two large pictures for him. In December 1740 the architect Johann Lukas von Hildebrandt noted that Urlaub also had a gift for sculpture.

In August 1741 he was summoned back and the following year was appointed as a court painter and in September assigned an assistant. However, he chafed at having to execute reverse glass painting for the Residence that had been designed by the court sculptor, Johann Wolfgang van der Auwera, rather than perfecting his skills.

== Italy ==
In mid-1774 Urlaub resigned his post and went to Bologna to study at the Accademia Clementina, a renowned art school. In October 1745 he won the prize in the second sculpture class. However, in 1746 he was forced to interrupt his studies for lack of money. He wrote to von Schönborn requesting financial assistance and a commission, but without success; his is the only known case of an artist voluntarily leaving the security of von Schönborn's court. Nagia Knott, who wrote a doctoral dissertation on Urlaub, found a contract with the stucco artist Antonio Bossi and suggested that the prince bishop required all artists for whose education he paid to pledge in exchange to remain working for him. In January 1747 "Giovanni Antonio Urlao di Franconia" won the prizes for the first classes in figure drawing and sculpture, among the highest distinctions awarded at the institution.

In 1749 Urlaub was in Venice, the then centre of modern Italian painting, where his notebooks show that he studied work by both Giambattista Tiepolo and the Guardis. when Karl Philipp von Greifenclau zu Vollraths became prince bishop. However, he also ignored Urlaub's requests.

== Return to Würzburg ==
Urlaub returned to Franconia in 1751, the end of approximately ten years as a journeyman. He was commissioned by Langheim Abbey to create an altarpiece for the parish church in Merkershausen. The following year, he was commissioned to create another altarpiece for the Dominican Church in Würzburg (which was destroyed in the bombing attack on the city on 16 March 1945). Also in 1752, he was commissioned to create a fresco for the Ipthausen church, and the following year, another for the parish church of Eyershausen. The Dominicans and Carthusians gave him further commissions between 1753 and 1756; he had so much work in Würzburg that he requested citizenship, which he received on 9 October 1755. He was the first local artist to receive such prestige commissions in the city, and in 1860, in the first history of art in Würzburg, Andreas Niedermayer called him and his brothers some of the best painters who worked there.

When Adam Friedrich von Seinsheim became prince bishop, he gave Urlaub a position as Cabinets Inspector, with the title of Cammerdiener (chamber attendant), but did not pay him highly. During the Seven Years' War, Urlaub painted frescoes and decorative paintings in the region, for example in Königheim in 1756 and Sonderhofen in 1757; he also painted portraits at court. On 15 September 1757, he succeeded Franz Ignaz Roth as court painter.

== Private life and death ==
On 13 October 1755, Urlaub married Anna Maria, who was also from Thüngersheim and was a distant cousin of his, requiring a dispensation. Their first child, Georg Adam Anton Urlaub, was born the following year and died on 17 August 1756. Their second child, Georg Hermann Joseph, was born in 1758 but died at six months of age on 28 October. Urlaub himself died in Würzburg on 20 February the following year. He was buried in the cemetery of the Dominican Abbey. In 1762 his widow married Johann Octavian Salver, who became archivist to the prince bishop in 1773.

== Selected works ==
Georg Anton Urlaub's works

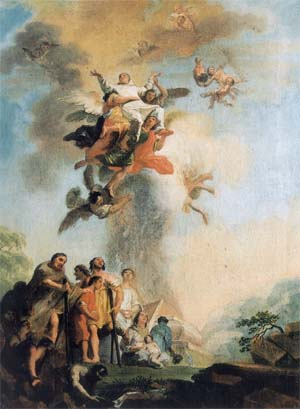
Assumption of St Bruno (c. 1753/54)

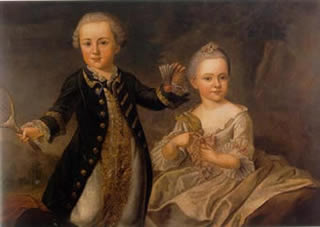
Portrait of a child (c. 1757/58)

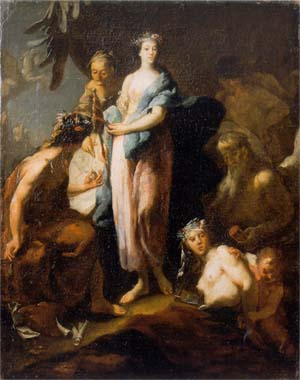
Allegory on the Life of Prince Bishop Karl von Schönborn (c. 1737)

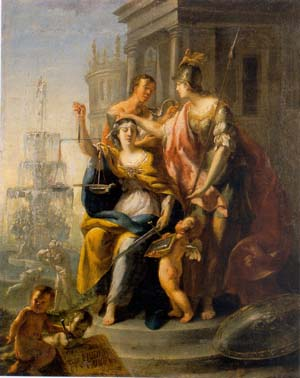
Allegory on the Virtues of Prince Bishop Friedrich Karl von Schönborn (c. 1737)

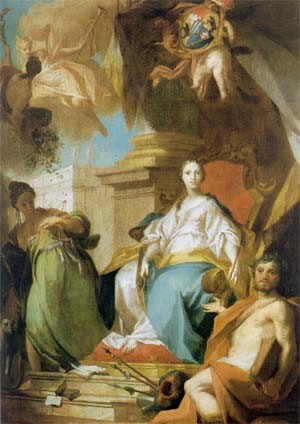
Allegory on the Rulership of Prince Bishop Adam Friedrich von Seinsheim (c. 1755/57)

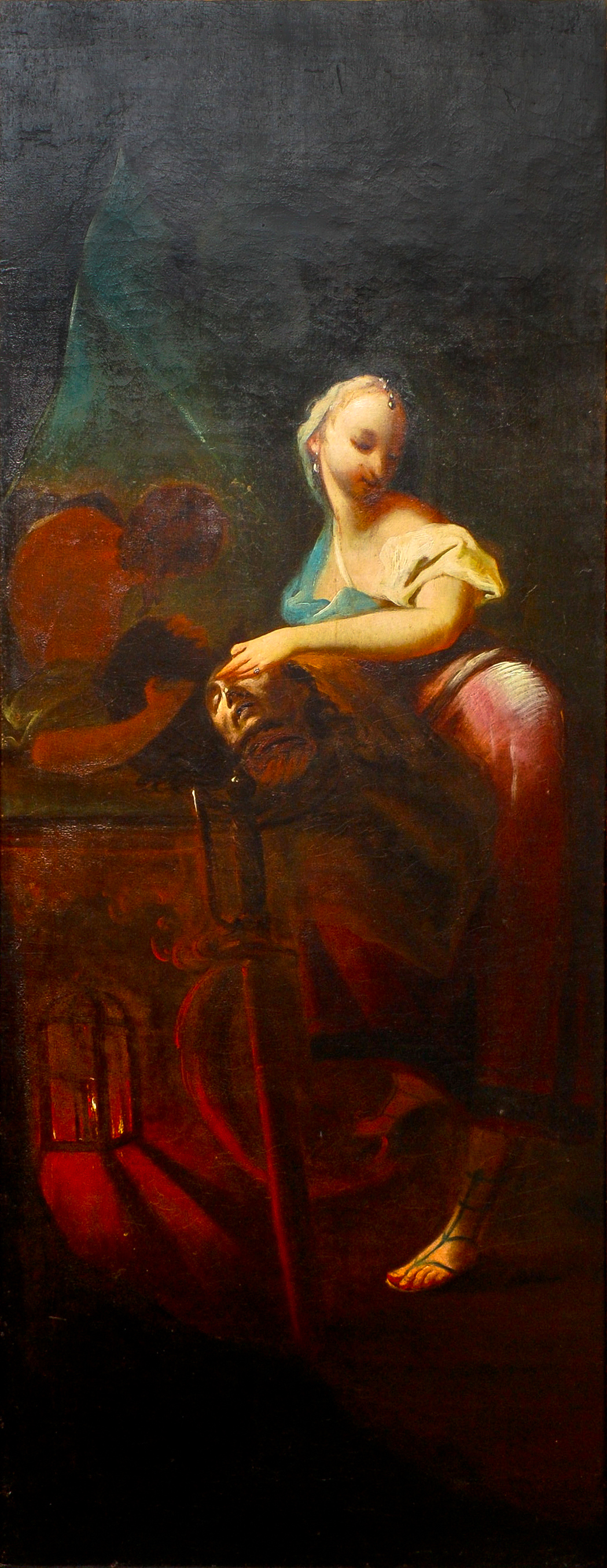
Judith with the Head of Holofernes (c. 1750/51)

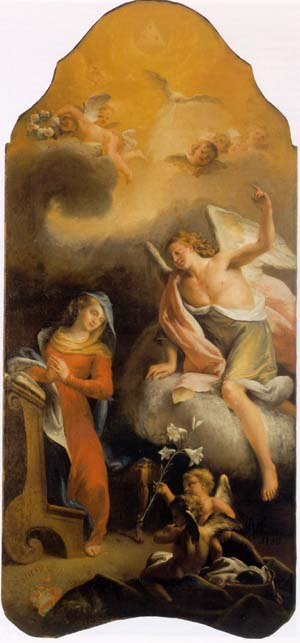
The Annunciation (c. 1756)

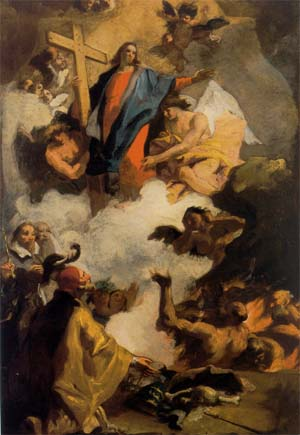
Glorification of the Name of Jesus (c. 1751/52)
