= Thüngersheim =

- Municipality
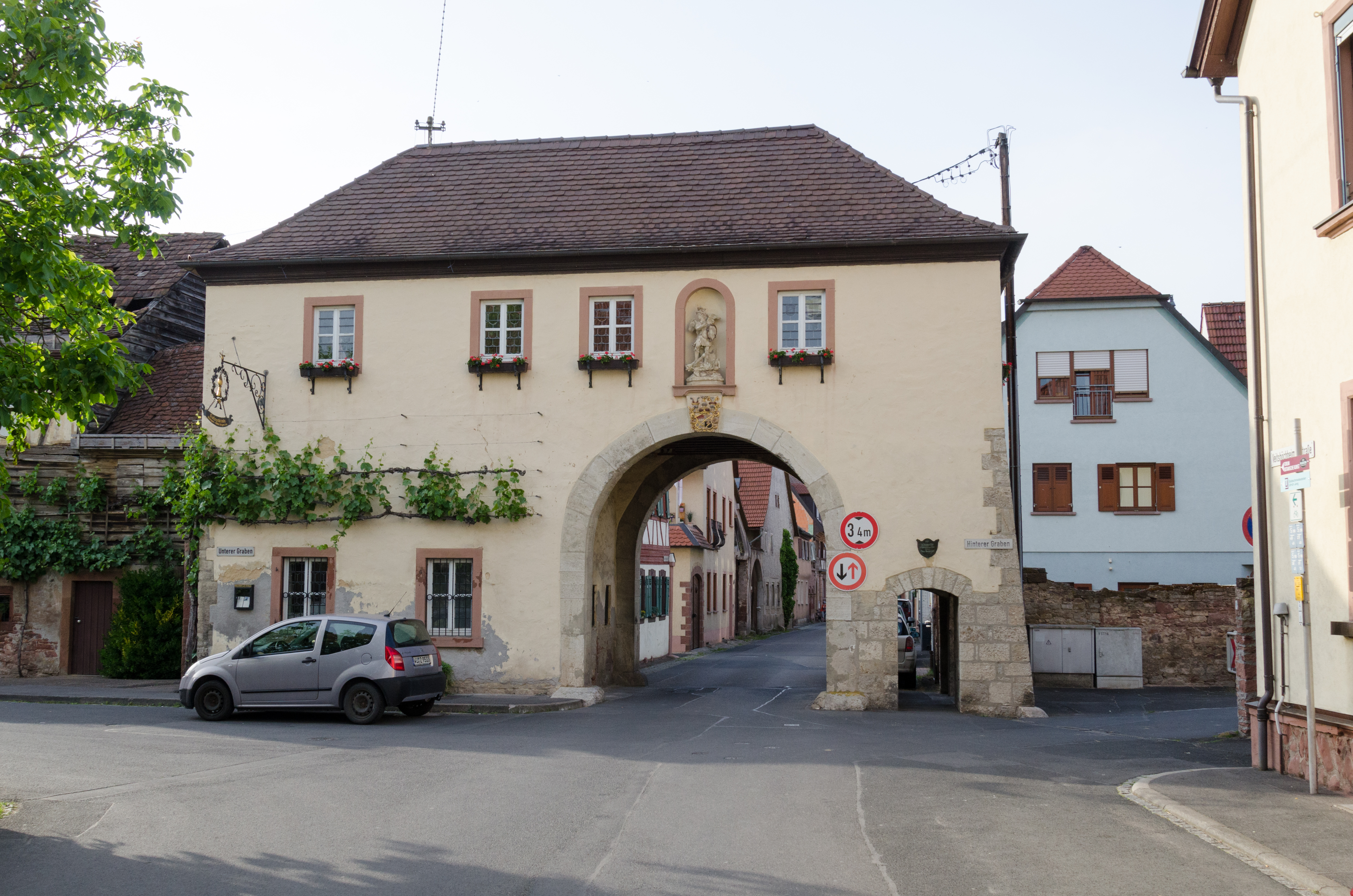
- Würzburg Gate, part of the town walls

- Coat of arms

- Location of Thüngersheim within Würzburg district
- Interactive map of Thüngersheim
- Location within Germany Location within Bavaria
- Coordinates: 49°52′N 09°50′E
- Country: Germany
- State: Bavaria
- Admin. region: Unterfranken
- District: Würzburg

Government
  - Mayor (2020–26): Michael Röhm

Area
  - Total: 11.06 km^{2} (4.27 sq mi)
- Elevation: 169 m (554 ft)

Population (2025-12-31)
  - Total: 2,645
  - Density: 239.2/km^{2} (619.4/sq mi)
- Time zone: UTC+01:00 (CET)
  - Summer (DST): UTC+02:00 (CEST)
- Postal codes: 97291
- Dialling codes: 09364
- Vehicle registration: WÜ
- Website: www.thuengersheim.de

Thüngersheim is a community located in Germany. The community is situated on the River Main. It is a community in the district of Würzburg (Bavaria, Administrative region Lower Franconia). The village is molded by the surrounding vineyards, more than 2 square kilometres (0.8 mi^{2}).

== Coat of arms ==
The coat of arms shows the local patron St. Michael. It was conferred on the village in 1581 by Julius Echter of Mespelbrunn, then Bishop of Würzburg.

== Geography ==
=== Geographic data ===
Located in the rain shadow of Rhön and Spessart, the average annual rainfall is 550 to 600 millimetres (22 to 24 in). This makes the Main valley one of the driest regions of Germany.

=== Neighbouring communities ===
Thüngersheim has common borders with Retzbach in the north, Retzstadt in the northeast, Güntersleben in the east, Veitshöchheim in the west and Zellingen and Erlabrunn (both separated from Thüngersheim by the river Main).

== History ==
- Formation of the village during the first phase of franconian settlement between 530 and 700 A.C.
- 1098: Thüngersheim is documented for the first time.
- 1154: The first vine is planted.
- 1614: Completion of the parish church St. Michael
- 1713: Georg Anton Urlaub is born in Thüngersheim.
- 1803: Thüngersheim belongs to the grand duchy of Ferdinand von Toskana (as part of the principality Würzburg).
- 1814: The grand duchy of Würzburg (to which Thüngersheim belongs) becomes part of Bavaria.
- 1870: A station and a railroad control center are built. Vine trade is shifted from the river Main to the railroad.
- 1930: Foundation of the vinegrowers co-operative by 55 local vinters.
- 1933: The barrage Erlabrunn is built.
- 1945: On March 16 the out-sourced municipal archive is destroyed during the bombing of Würzburg.
- 1966: The majority of the vinters agrees on the land consolidation, 2.2 square kilometres of vineyards.
- 1998: "900 years" celebration

== Religion ==
=== Denominations ===
Thüngersheim is predominantly Catholic (parish church St. Michael). In 2003 a parish community was formed with St. Maternus Güntersleben.

=== Pilgrimage to the Kreuzberg (Cross Mountain) ===
A prominent religious event is the pilgrimage to the Kreuzberg. It is undertaken once a year. The destination is the Kreuzberg in the Rhön, which is also called the holy mountain of the Franconians. It dates back to the 18th century.

== Politics ==
=== Municipal council ===
The municipal council consists of 14 members (plus the mayor). Seven members belong to the free voters community, five to the Christian Social Union (CSU), and two to the Social Democratic Party (SPD).

=== Town twinning ===
Thüngersheim is twinned to St. Aignan de Grand Lieu (France). More information (in German and French ) is available at .

=== Population development ===
- 1939: 1,753
- 1950: 2,345
- 1961: 2,270
- 1970: 2,432
- 1987: 2,453
- 1993: 2,505
- 1994: 2,567
- 1995: 2,596
- 1996: 2,615

1996: female 1,300, male 1,315

== Culture and sights ==
=== Buildings ===
The parish church St. Michael is worth seeing (literature - in German - is referenced below). Three of the once four gate lodges are still present. They were part of the fortification (a ring of walls surrounding the town centre).

=== Associations ===
(all the information is in German)
Gesangverein
Musikverein

=== Libraries ===
Municipal library located in the former town hall and Catholic public library.

== Businesses and infrastructure ==
Thüngersheim is the domicile of the Winzergenossenschaft Thüngersheim eG (vinters' co-operative) founded in 1930. With more than 2 square kilometres (0.77 sq mi), Thüngersheim is one of the largest vine villages in Franconia.

=== Transport ===
Thüngersheim is located at the Bundesstraße (federal road) 27 and on the railroad line Würzburg-Gemünden.

=== Education ===
The only school is the elementary school (first to fourth grade).

=== Recreation facilities ===
- Outdoor swimming pool
- Gymnasium
- Sports stadium (soccer, tennis, handball)

== Notable people ==
- Georg Anton Urlaub, Baroque painter, a staff member of Giovanni Battista Tiepolo
- Georg Sebastian Urlaub, Baroque painter

== Literature ==
(all the literature is in German)

- Johann Valentin Hart: Main, Wein, Thüngersheim. 1933.
- Richard Glaab: Thüngersheim - Gegenwart und Vergangenheit einer mainfränkischen Winzergemeinde. Thüngersheim, Gde. (Hrsg.), 1982.
- Adam Oechsner: Die Mundart von Thüngersheim. Würzburg, Univ., Diss., 1920.
- August Zeyer: Schöa worsch - Der Thüngersheimer August Zeyer erzählt in Mundart und Prosa aus seinem Leben. Selbstverlag, Thüngersheim, 1989.
- St. Michael Thüngersheim, Schnell Kunstführer Nr. 1565. Schnell und Steiner, München, ^{1}1986.
- Christine Brandl: Vom Härwest bis Foosenocht
- Wolfgang Brückner: Die Wallfahrt zum Kreuzberg in der Rhön. Echter, Würzburg, 1997.
- Gemeinde Thüngersheim (Hrsg.): Thüngersheim - Ein Winzerort in Mainfranken. Vorbereitende Untersuchungen zur Ortsanierung nach Baugesetzbuch, Bericht 1 (30. November 2000)
