= Aub (Verwaltungsgemeinschaft) =

- Verwaltungsgemeinschaft
- Location of Aub within Würzburg district
- Interactive map of Aub
- Location within Germany Location within Bavaria
- Coordinates: 49°33′N 10°04′E
- Country: Germany
- State: Bavaria
- Admin. region: Lower Franconia
- District: Würzburg
- Seat: Aub
- Subdivisions: 3 municipalities

Area
  - Total: 52.09 km^{2} (20.11 sq mi)

Population (2025-12-31)
  - Total: 3,035
  - Density: 58.26/km^{2} (150.9/sq mi)
- Time zone: UTC+01:00 (CET)
  - Summer (DST): UTC+02:00 (CEST)
- Website: www.vgem-aub.de

Aub is a Verwaltungsgemeinschaft (municipal association) in the district of Würzburg in Bavaria, Germany. Its seat is in Aub.

It consists of the following municipalities:

1. Aub
2. Gelchsheim
3. Sonderhofen
