= Gollach =

River in Germany

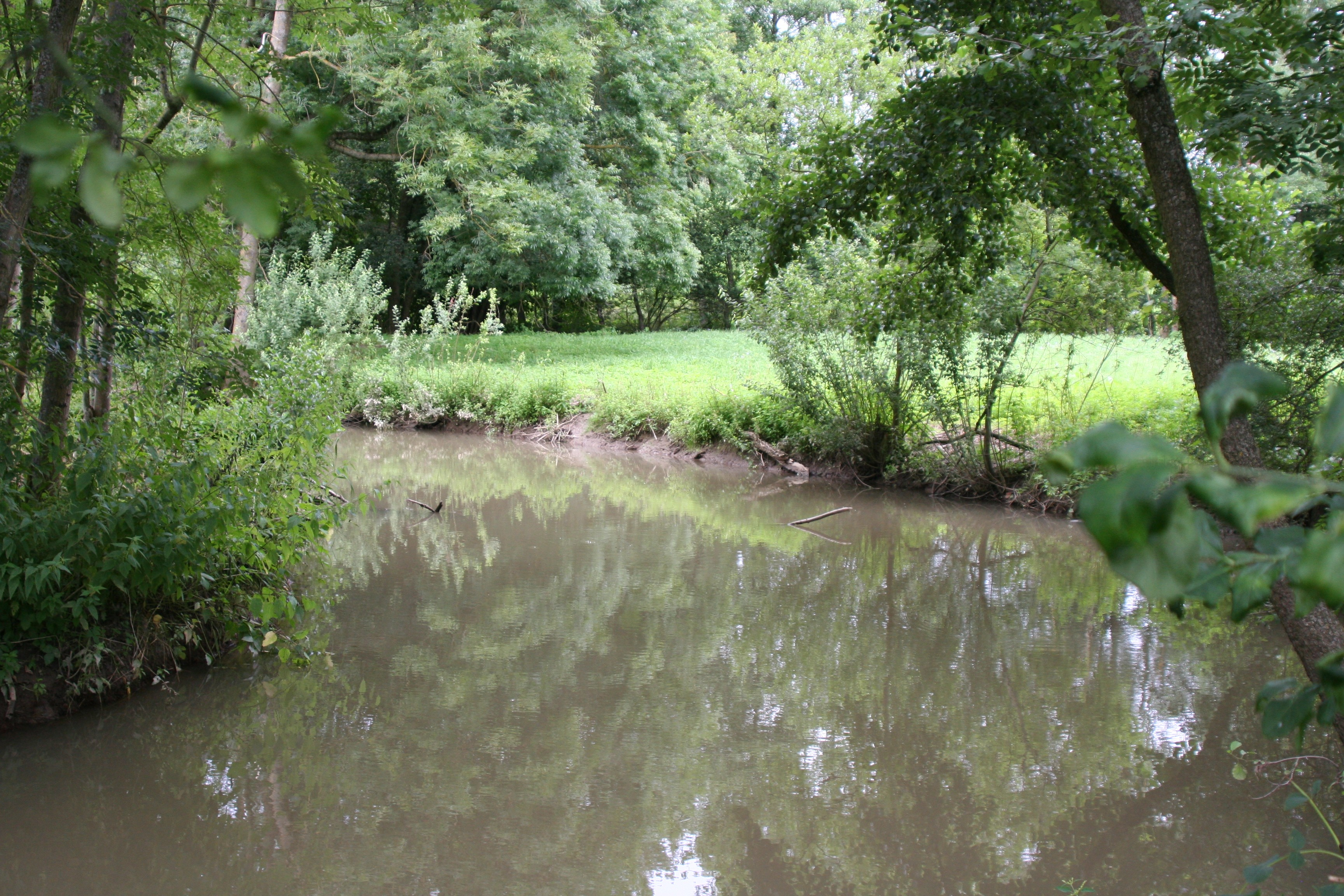
- The Gollach in Baldersheim (a parish of Aub)

Location
- Country: Germany
- State: Bavaria

Physical characteristics
- Mouth
  - location: Tauber
  - coordinates: 49.5196°N 10.0039°E
- Length: 33.6 km (20.9 mi)
- Basin size: 165 km^{2} (64 sq mi)

Basin features
- Progression: Tauber→ Main→ Rhine→ North Sea

Gollach is a river of Bavaria, Germany. It flows into the Tauber in Bieberehren.

== See also ==
- List of rivers of Bavaria
