= Gelchsheim =

- Municipality
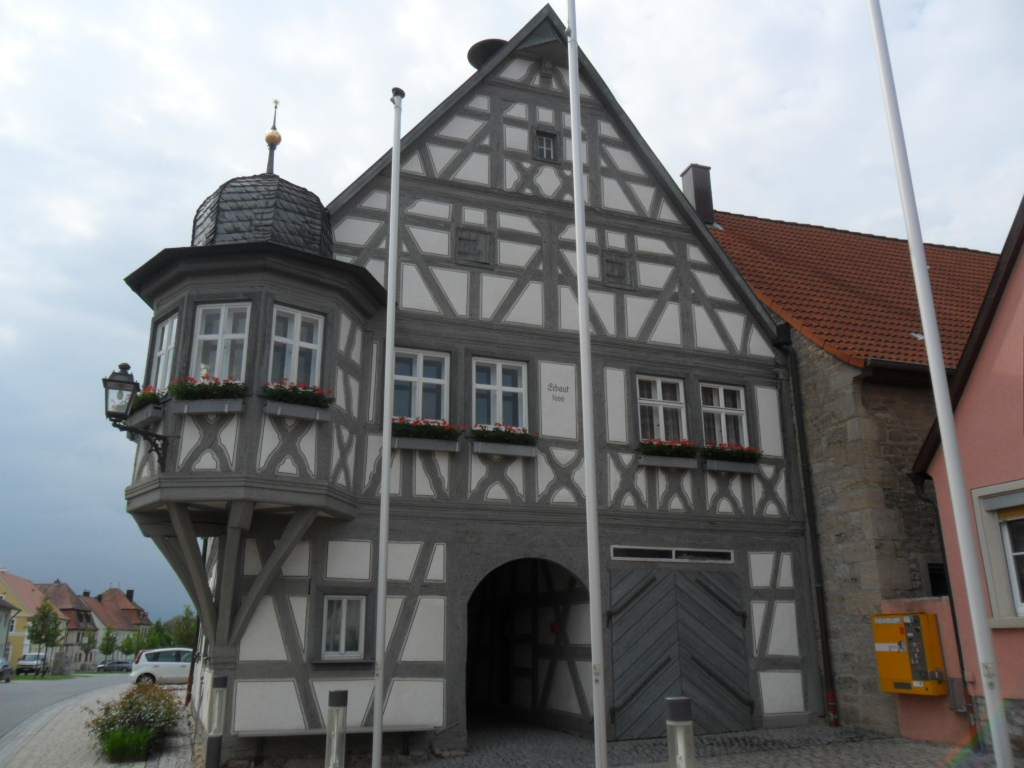
- Town hall

- Coat of arms

- Location of Gelchsheim within Würzburg district
- Interactive map of Gelchsheim
- Location within Germany Location within Bavaria
- Coordinates: 49°34′N 10°1′E
- Country: Germany
- State: Bavaria
- Admin. region: Unterfranken
- District: Würzburg
- Municipal assoc.: Aub

Government
  - Mayor (2020–26): Roland Nöth

Area
  - Total: 15.75 km^{2} (6.08 sq mi)
- Elevation: 304 m (997 ft)

Population (2025-12-31)
  - Total: 834
  - Density: 53.0/km^{2} (137/sq mi)
- Time zone: UTC+01:00 (CET)
  - Summer (DST): UTC+02:00 (CEST)
- Postal codes: 97255
- Dialling codes: 09335
- Vehicle registration: WÜ
- Website: www.gelchsheim.de

Gelchsheim is a market town and municipality in the district of Würzburg in Bavaria, Germany.
