= Güntersleben =

- Municipality
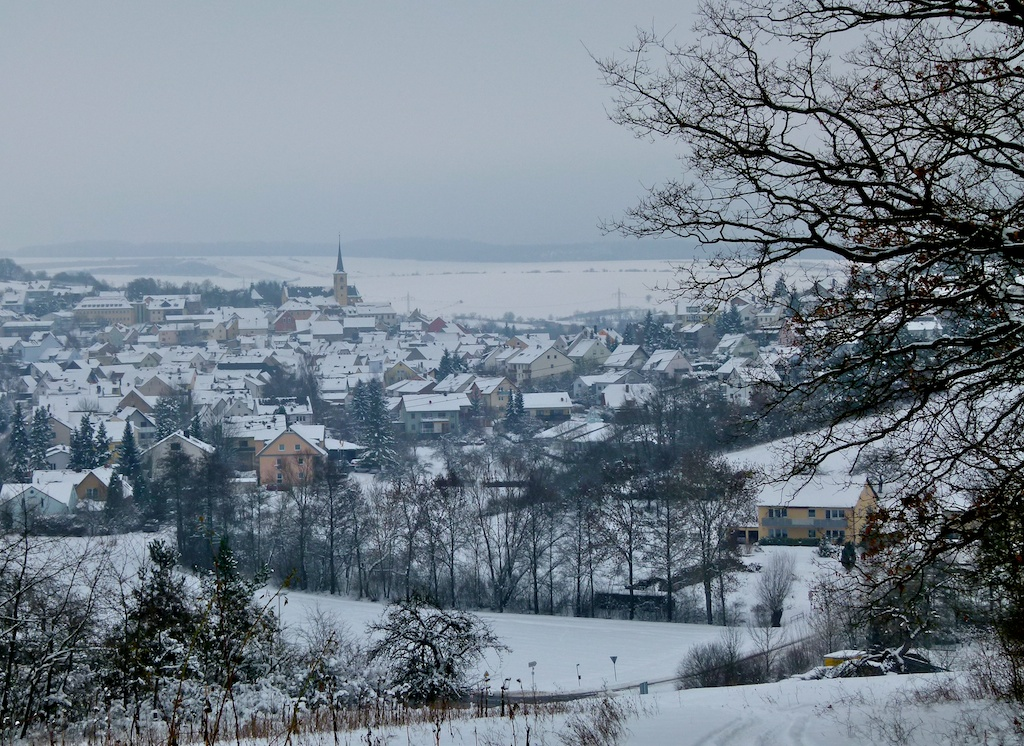
- Güntersleben in winter

- Coat of arms

- Location of Güntersleben within Würzburg district
- Interactive map of Güntersleben
- Location within Germany Location within Bavaria
- Coordinates: 49°52′N 9°54′E
- Country: Germany
- State: Bavaria
- Admin. region: Unterfranken
- District: Würzburg

Government
  - Mayor (2023–29): Michael Freudenberger (CSU)

Area
  - Total: 16.05 km^{2} (6.20 sq mi)
- Elevation: 273 m (896 ft)

Population (2025-12-31)
  - Total: 4,368
  - Density: 272.1/km^{2} (704.9/sq mi)
- Time zone: UTC+01:00 (CET)
  - Summer (DST): UTC+02:00 (CEST)
- Postal codes: 97261
- Dialling codes: 09365
- Vehicle registration: WÜ
- Website: www.guentersleben.de

Güntersleben is a municipality in the district of Würzburg in Bavaria in Germany.

== History ==
The earliest record of Güntersleben dates from 1113. Another local place name, now lost, is Thüngersleben. In 1510 the village was hit by a severe fire, and in 1611 the plague claimed 141 victims. Güntersleben was within the Prince-Bishopric of Würzburg, and the Benedictine monastery of St Stephan at Würzburg had the right to the tithes until 1802. As part of the Franconian Circle, Güntersleben was secularized in favor of Bavaria in 1803. At the Peace of Pressburg of 1805, the area was confirmed to Ferdinand III, Grand Duke of Tuscany, as part of the Grand Duchy of Würzburg, and in 1814 with the defeat of Napoleon this became part of the Kingdom of Bavaria. In 1818, a municipality was established.

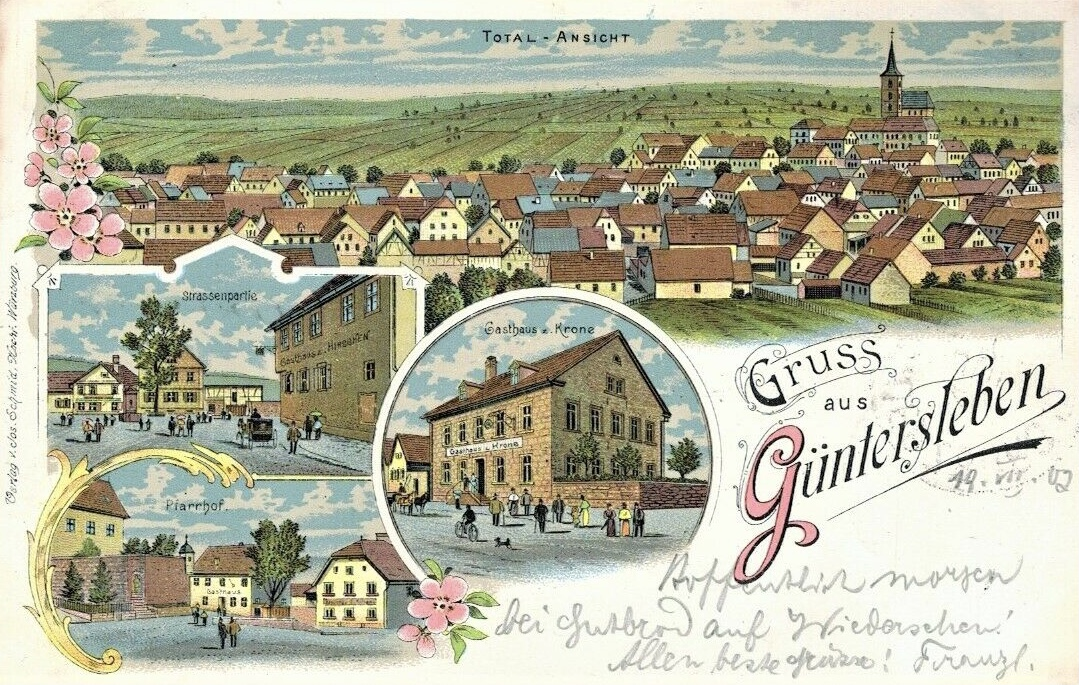
View of Güntersleben by Josef Schmid, c. 1902
