= Johann Octavian Salver =

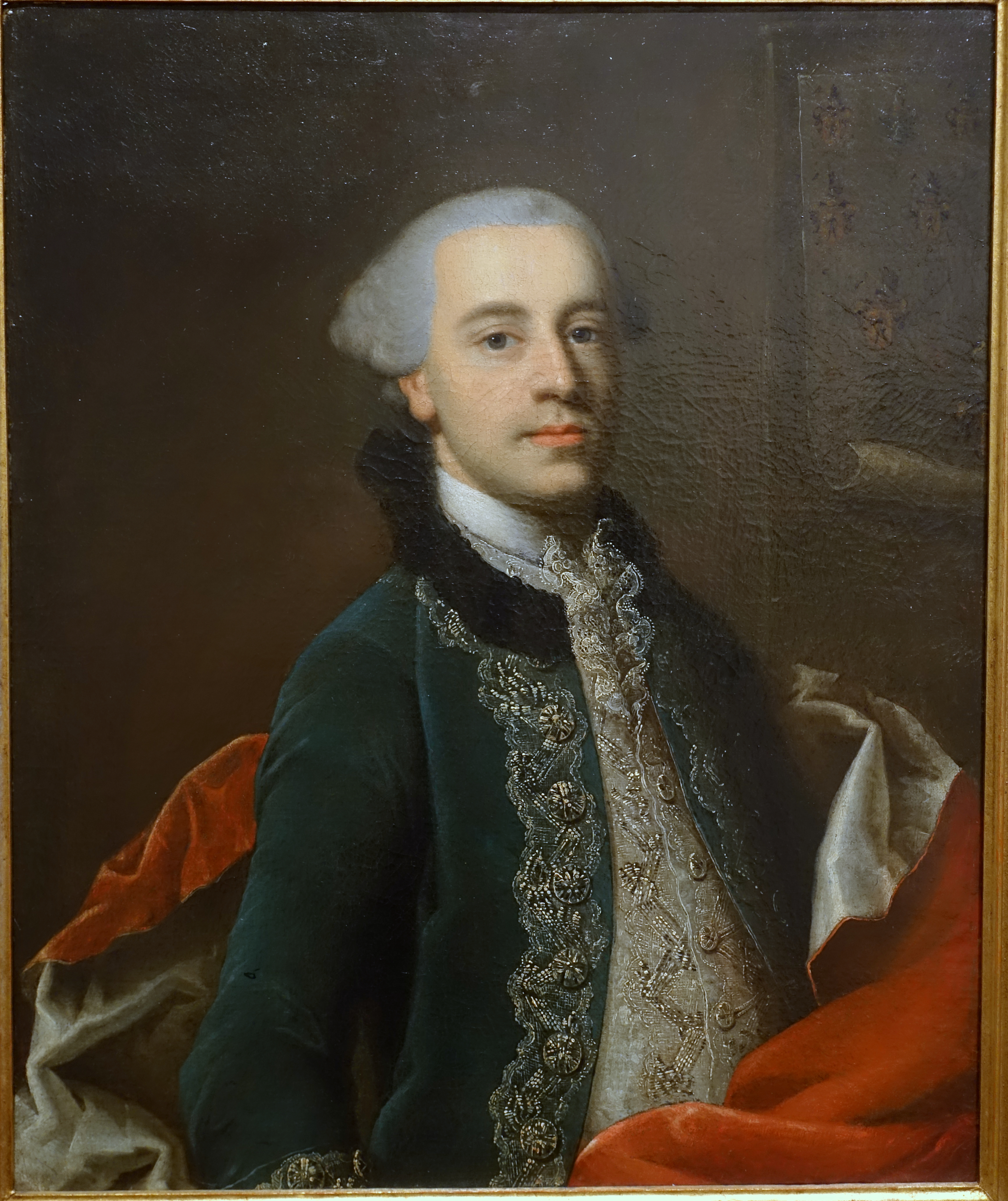
Johann Octavian Salver by Georg Karl Urlaub, 1765

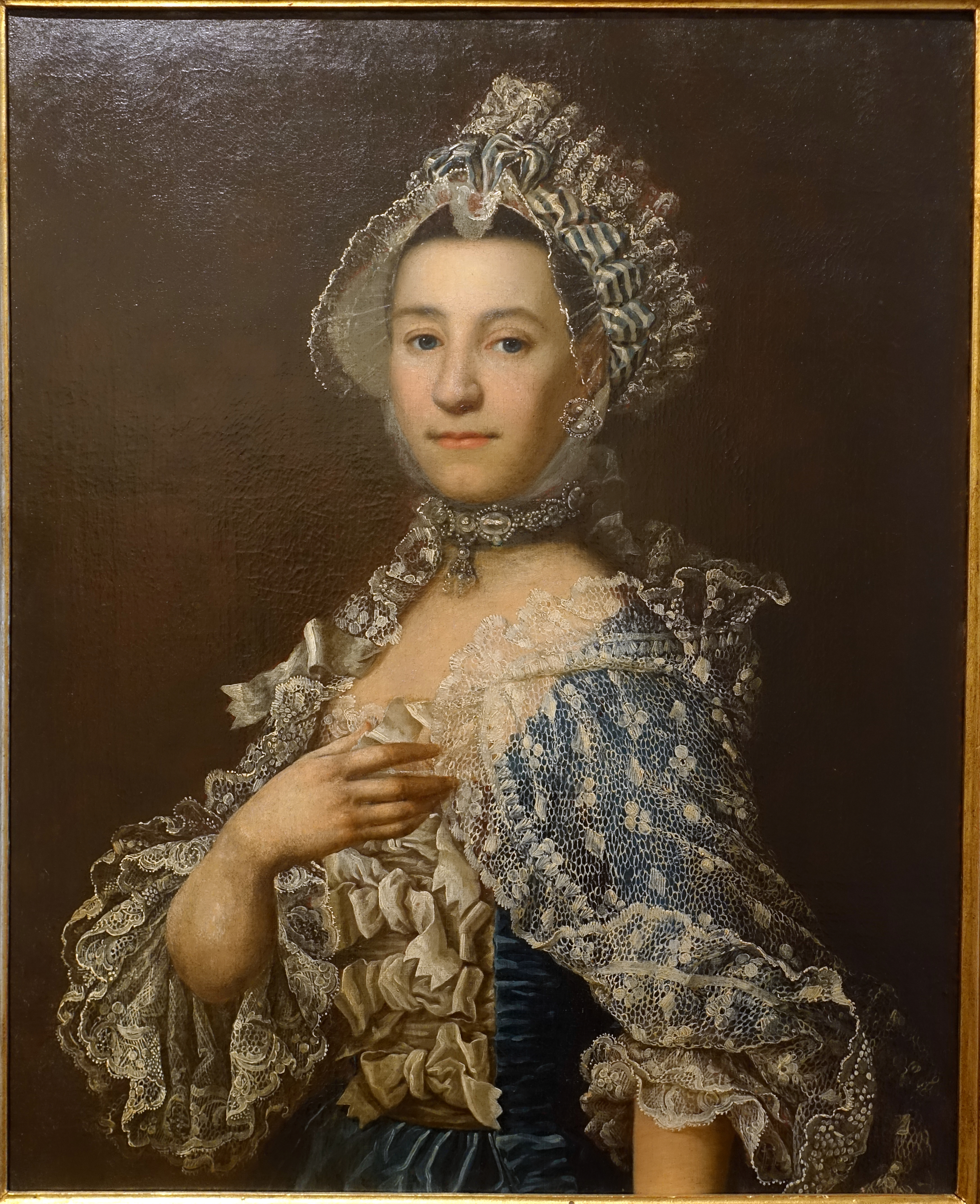
Maria Salver by Georg Karl Urlaub, 1765

Johann Octavian Salver (1732–1788) was a German diplomat, archivist, and engraver.

== Biography ==
Born on 19 May 1732 at Würzburg as a son of the engraver Johann Salver († 1738) from his third wife. He attended high school until 1749, then the University of Würzburg where he first studied the law, then history and heraldry. He showed talent for painting and practiced diligently in drawing. Because he lacked the means to further his art education and failed to secure support from wealthy benefactors, Salver returned to his legal studies although he also dealt in passing with the production of maps. Later he did historical research in Gotha, Weimar, Mainz, Speyer, etc.

In 1762 Salver was appointed Episcopal Lehnamtsregistrator. In addition, beginning in 1768, he worked as a diplomat for the Bishopric of Würzburg. In 1770 he was a Protocollist of the princely court chamber and head of the Jewish Office. In his spare time he made a description of the Erthal collection of coins and medallions. Due to the death of the princely archivist J. J. Dümler in 1773, he received Dümler's office.

After becoming archivist to the Prince-Bishop of Würzburg Adam Friedrich von Seinsheim, Salver completed the major work of his life, Proben des hohen Teütschen Reichs Adels oder Sammlungen alter Denkmäler, Grabsteine, Wappen, Inn- und Urschriften, u.d. Nach ihrem wahren Urbilde aufgenommen, unter offner Treü bewähret, und durch Ahnenbäume auch sonstige Nachrichten erkläret und erläutert (Samples of the high nobility Germans, a collection of all arms, tombstones and inscriptions, which refer to the Würzburg bishops and members of the cathedral chapter). It was released in 1775 with more than 300 folio engravings.

Salver died on 23 April 1788. His posthumous collections of manuscripts were scattered after his death, a portion of them came into the hands of the learned Kuustforschers Jos. Heller in Bamberg.

== Works ==
- Proben des hohen Teütschen Reichs Adels oder Sammlungen alter Denkmäler, Grabsteine, Wappen, Inn- und Urschriften, u.d. Nach ihrem wahren Urbilde aufgenommen, unter offner Treü bewähret, und durch Ahnenbäume auch sonstige Nachrichten erkläret und erläutert (Würzburg, 1775).
- Matrikel und Wappenbuch der florierenden, erloschenen und hinweggezogenen hohen Rittergliedern einer unmittelbaren freyen Reichs Ritterschaft Landes zu Franken löbl. Orts an der Baunach (Würzburg, 1785).

== Notes ==
- Johann H. Salver, referenced as engraver of 1750 Fulda print, may be Johann Octavian Salver.
