= Sonderhofen =

- Municipality
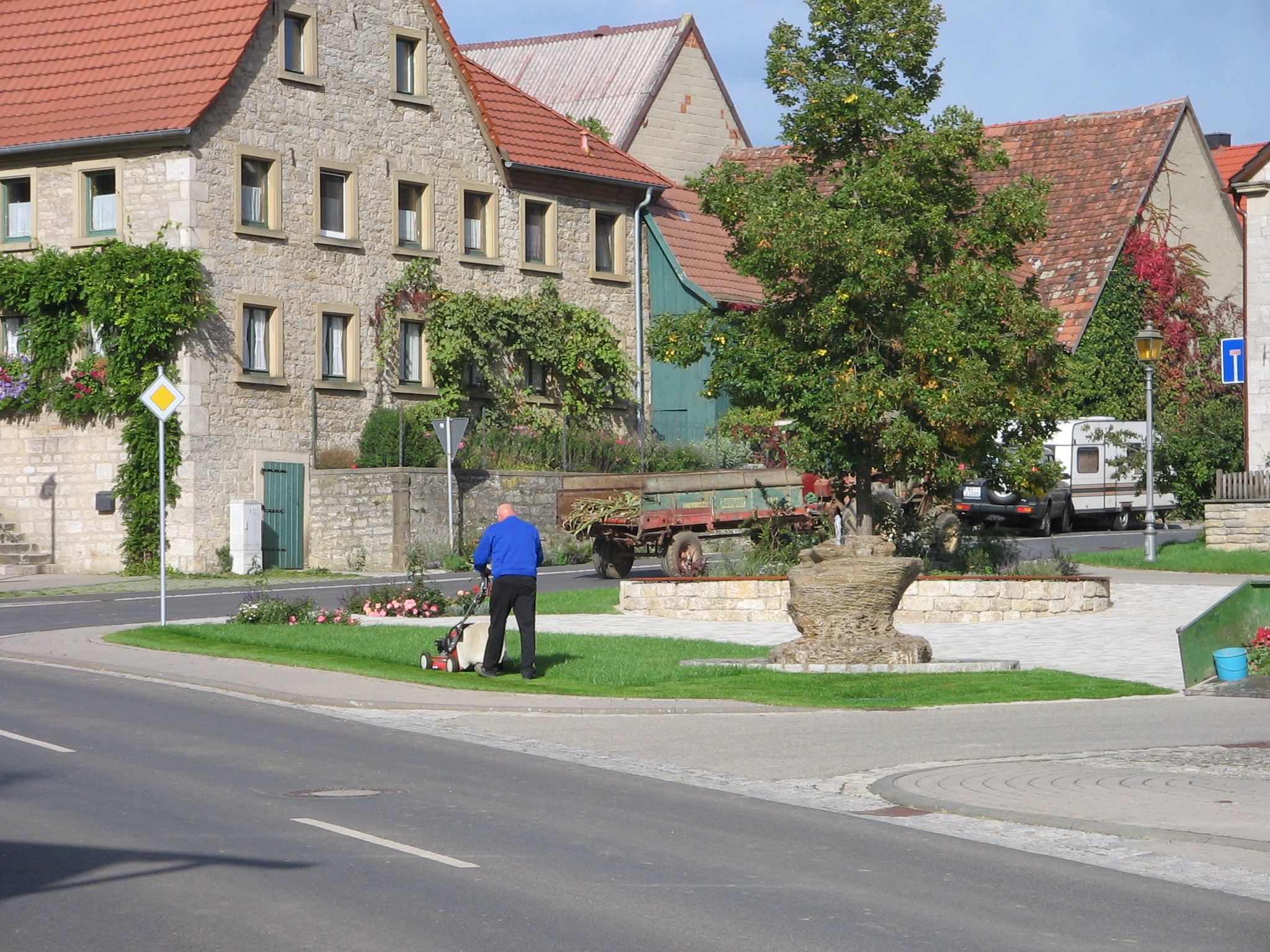
- Center of the village

- Coat of arms

- Location of Sonderhofen within Würzburg district
- Interactive map of Sonderhofen
- Location within Germany Location within Bavaria
- Coordinates: 49°36′N 10°0′E
- Country: Germany
- State: Bavaria
- Admin. region: Unterfranken
- District: Würzburg
- Municipal assoc.: Aub

Government
  - Mayor (2020–26): Heribert Neckermann (FW)

Area
  - Total: 18.80 km^{2} (7.26 sq mi)
- Elevation: 293 m (961 ft)

Population (2025-12-31)
  - Total: 876
  - Density: 46.6/km^{2} (121/sq mi)
- Time zone: UTC+01:00 (CET)
  - Summer (DST): UTC+02:00 (CEST)
- Postal codes: 97255
- Dialling codes: 09337
- Vehicle registration: WÜ
- Website: www.sonderhofen.de

Sonderhofen is a municipality in the district of Würzburg in Bavaria, Germany.
