= Tauber Valley Cycleway =

Bicycle path along the River Tauber, Germany

Coordinates: 49.5169181°N 9.7461164°E

Taubertalradweg
- Length: 101 km (63 mi)
- Location: Tauber (River), Franconia, Baden-Württemberg, Germany
- Trailheads: Rothenburg ob der Tauber, Bad Mergentheim, Tauberbischofsheim, Wertheim
- Use: Cycling, Walking, Nordic Walking, Jogging, Inline Skating
- Difficulty: Easy to Moderate

The Tauber Valley Cycleway (German: Taubertalradweg), official name in German: Liebliches Taubertal (der Klassiker), in English Lovely Tauber Valley (the Classic), also Charming Tauber Valley (the Classic), is a German bicycle path running about 101 km along the River Tauber in Franconia, Germany. The cycleway runs from Rothenburg ob der Tauber via Bad Mergentheim and Tauberbischofsheim to Wertheim at the confluence of the Tauber and the Main. The path runs along its whole length through the valley of the Tauber and has only gentle ascents. At both ends and along the route there are railway stations. The General German Bicycle Club (ADFC) rated the trail five stars in 2009, the second path in Germany to receive this award after Main Cycleway.

== Routes and variants ==
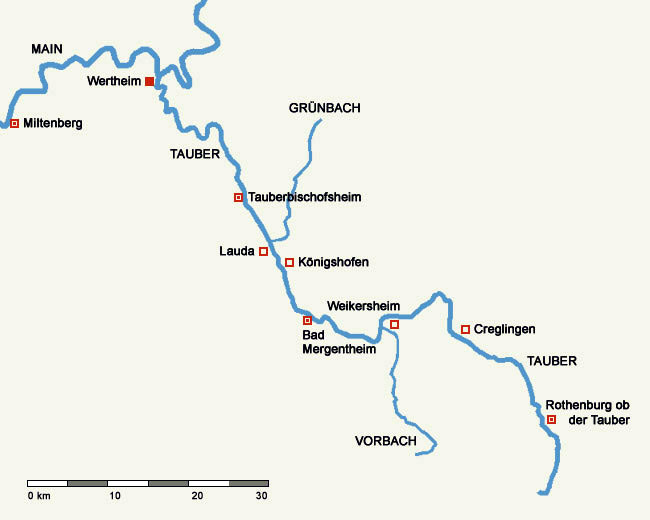
The route Charming Tauber Valley (Classic)

=== Charming Tauber valley (classic) ===
From Rothenburg ob der Tauber (or from Wertheim in the other direction) this popular bicycle tour runs along the "Lovely Tauber valley" (also "Charming Tauber valley"), to Weikersheim, Bad Mergentheim, Lauda, Tauberbischofsheim and finally Wertheim, just u reach just over 100 kilometres away. Th recommended daily stages of the "Charming Tauber Valley (Classic)" route are:

- 1st day's stage - Rothenburg ob der Tauber to Weikersheim (or Bad Mergentheim)
- 2nd day's stage - (Weikersheim via) Bad Mergentheim to Tauberbischofsheim
- 3rd day's stage - Tauberbischofsheim to Wertheim

=== Charming Tauber valley (sportive) ===
From Wertheim (or from Rothenburg ob der Tauber in the other direction), you can cycle back to the starting point in five recommended extra stages of the route "Charming Tauber Valley (Sportive)":

- 1st day's stage - Wertheim to Freudenberg
- 2nd day's stage - Freudenberg to Külsheim
- 3rd day's stage - Külsheim to Boxberg
- 4th day's stage - Boxberg to Niederstetten
- 5th day's stage - Niederstetten to Rothenburg ob der Tauber

== Connections with other cycling paths ==
- A connection with the Main Cycleway in Wertheim.
