= Main Cycleway =

Bicycle route in Germany

Coordinates: 50.0295°N 11.8238°E

Main-Radweg
- Main-Radweg Logo
- Length: 600 km (370 mi)
- Location: Main (river), Franconia, Hesse, Germany
- Trailheads: Creußen, Weidenberg, Bayreuth, Neuenmarkt, Kulmbach, Lichtenfels, Bad Staffelstein, Bamberg, Zeil am Main, Haßfurt, Schweinfurt, Volkach, Kitzingen, Ochsenfurt, Würzburg, Karlstadt am Main, Lohr am Main, Wertheim am Main, Miltenberg, Aschaffenburg, Seligenstadt, Frankfurt am Main, Mainz
- Use: Cycling, Walking, Nordic Walking, Jogging, Inline Skating
- Difficulty: Easy to Moderate

The Main Cycleway (German: Main-Radweg) is a major German bicycle path running for about 600 km along the River Main in Germany. It starts from either Creußen or Bischofsgrün and ends in Mainz. The General German Bicycle Club (ADFC) rated the trail five stars in 2008, the first path in Germany to receive this award. Approximately 90% of the path is paved and 77% of the route is at least 2.5 metres wide.

== Trail itinerary ==
From east to west (generally), the cycleway passes through the many notable places shown below (with UNESCO World Heritage Sites listed):

- Bischofsgrün (starting point on the White Main)
- Bad Berneck im Fichtelgebirge (From the former station west of Bischofsgrün to here, the trail follows the river on a former railway path)
- Himmelkron
- Trebgast
- Creußen (starting point on the Red Main)
- Weidenberg
- Bayreuth
  - Margravial Opera House
- Neuenmarkt
- Kulmbach (White and Red Main unite)
- Burgkunstadt/Altenkunstadt
- Michelau
- Lichtenfels
- Bad Staffelstein
- Bamberg
  - Bamberg Altstadt
- Zeil am Main
- Haßfurt
- Schweinfurt
- Volkach
- Kitzingen
- Ochsenfurt
- Würzburg
  - Würzburg Residence
- Karlstadt am Main
- Gemünden am Main
- Lohr am Main
- Rothenfels
- Marktheidenfeld
- Urphar
- Wertheim am Main
- Miltenberg
- Aschaffenburg
- Seligenstadt
- Frankfurt am Main
- Mainz

== Connections with other major cycling paths ==
- Rheinradweg between Mainz-Kostheim and Mainz-Kastel
- Hessischer Radfernweg R3 between Rheinmündung and Hanau
- Hessischer Radfernweg R4 in Maintal (Rumpenheim—Bischofsheim Ferry)
- Hessischer Radfernweg R6 in Mainz Kostheim (Mainbrücke)
- Hessischer Radfernweg R8 in Frankfurt-Höchst (Mainbrücke)
- Deutscher Limes-Radweg between Großkrotzenburg and Miltenberg
- Kahltal-Spessart-Radwanderweg
- Main-Werra-Radweg
- Taubertalradweg
- Wern-Radweg
- Saale-Radweg

== River and its culture ==
The route includes UNESCO World Heritage Sites in the cities of Würzburg, Bamberg and Bayreuth. In Würzburg, the honour goes to the Residenz Castle, the former residence of the city's prince-bishops. The castle was built and furnished between 1720 and 1780. The grand staircase with the single largest ceiling fresco in the world is the most unusual part of the castle. In Bamberg, the entire old town is a world heritage. Founded over 1,000 years ago, the city combines the magic of the Middle Ages and the Baroque era. Notable features include the Imperial Cathedral, the New Residence, the Town Hall, the Alte Hofhaltung Estate, and half-timbered architecture. In Bayreuth the world heritage site is the “Margravial Opera House”. Margravine Wilhelmine commissioned the Bolognese architect, Giuseppe Galli Bibiena and his son Carlo to design its interior. With a depth of 27 metres, the stage of this opera house was the largest one in Germany until 1871.

In 1749, the German poet Johann Wolfgang von Goethe was born in Frankfurt am Main. The city honours Goethe with the Goethe House and the Goethe Museum. In 1785, The Brothers Grimm Jacob Grimm and Wilhelm Grimm were born in the town of Hanau.

Castles in the region include the Isenburg Castle in Offenbach, the Johannisburg Castle in Aschaffenburg, the New Castle in Bayreuth, the Plassenburg Castle in Kulmbach, and the Marienberg Fortress in Würzburg. There are State Galleries in Aschaffenburg, Bamberg, Kulmbach, and Bayreuth. The Museum Georg Schäfer in Schweinfurt has a collection of 19th century German art.

== Publications ==
- bikeline-Radtourenbuch Main-Radweg, 1:75.000, Verlag Esterbauer, Rodingersdorf, 2000, ISBN 978-3-85000-023-9, in German.
- BVA Kompaktspiralo Main-Radweg, 1:75.000, Bielefelder Verlag, Bielefeld, 2011, ISBN 978-3-87073-498-5, in German.
- Radwanderkarte Main-Radweg 1 – Creußen/Ochsenkopf—Würzburg, 1:50,000, Publicpress-Verlag, Geseke, 2006, ISBN 978-3-89920-267-0, in German.
- Radwanderkarte Main-Radweg 2 – Würzburg—Mainz, 1:50.000, Publicpress-Verlag, Geseke, 2007, ISBN 978-3-89920-319-6, in German.
