= Main (river) =

River in Germany

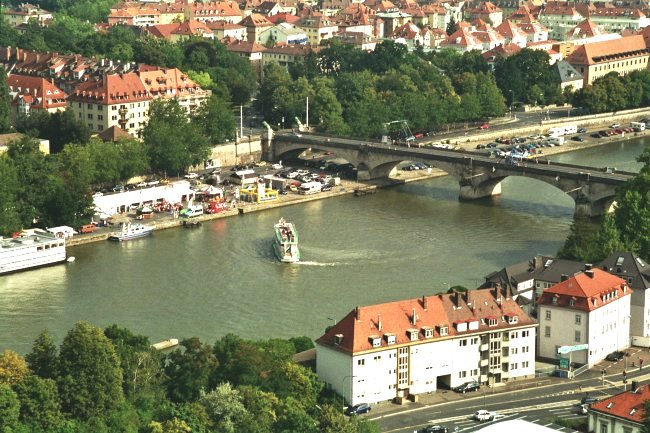
- The Main River in Würzburg

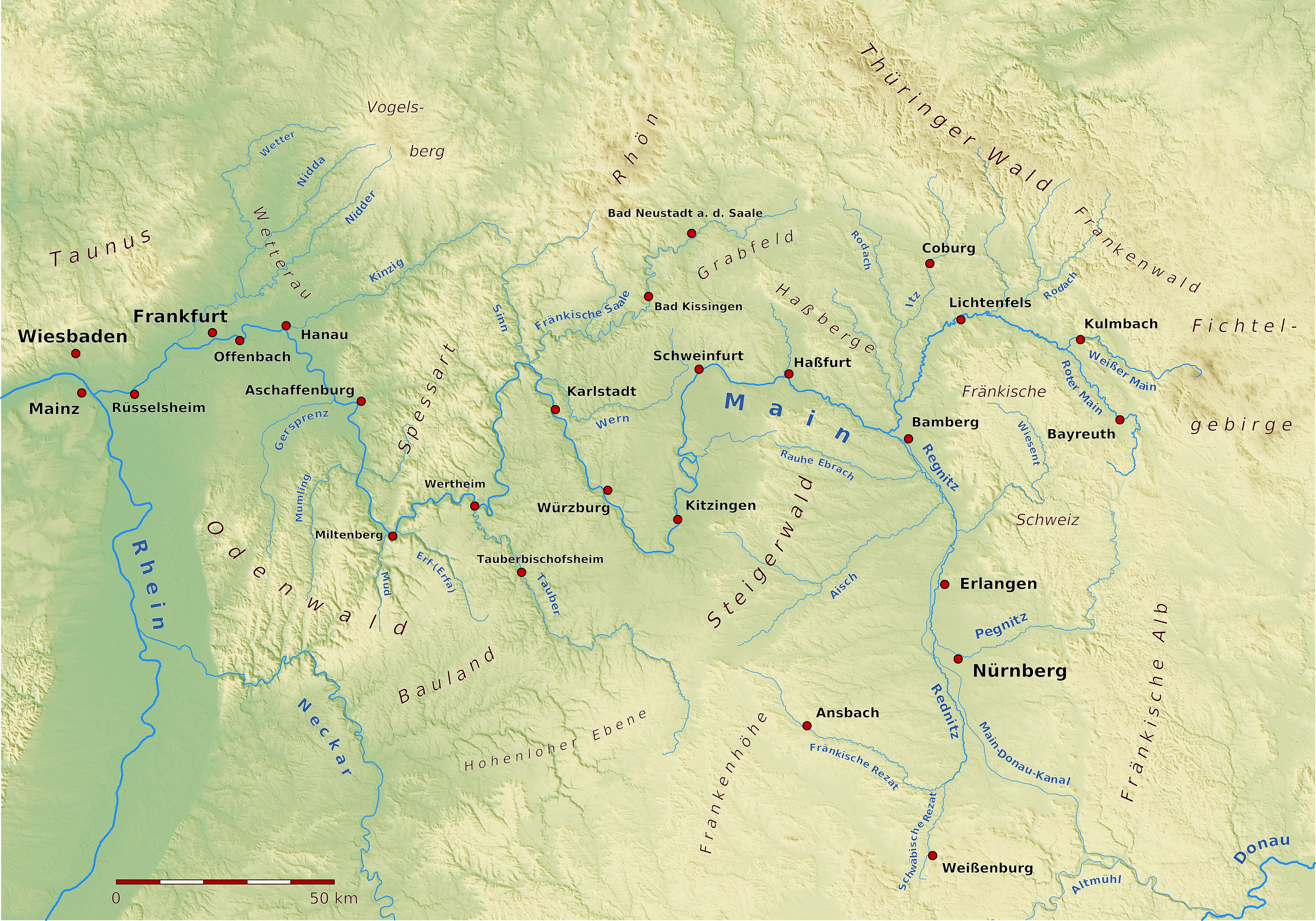
- Position of the Main in Germany

Location
- Country: Germany
- States: Hesse Bavaria Baden-Württemberg

Physical characteristics
- Source
  - location: Upper Franconia
  - coordinates: 50°5′11″N 11°23′54″E
  - elevation: 895 metres (at Weissmainquelle)
- Mouth
  - location: Rhine
  - coordinates: 49°59′40″N 8°17′36″E
  - elevation: 83 m (272 ft)
- Length: 524.9 km (326.2 mi)
- Basin size: 27,208 km^{2} (10,505 sq mi)
- Discharge
  - average: 200 m^{3}/s (7,100 cu ft/s)

Basin features
- Progression: Rhine→ North Sea

The Main (German pronunciation: [ˈmaɪn]) is a river in central Germany. It is the longest tributary of the Rhine, one of the major European rivers. It rises as the White Main in the Fichtel Mountains of northeastern Bavaria (Note: The Bavarian authorities define the source of the White Main as the source of the Main itself, although the sources of the Red Main and the Franconian Rezat are actually further from the Rhine.) and flows west for 525 kilometres (326 mi) to meet the Rhine below Rüsselsheim, Hesse. The cities of Mainz and Wiesbaden are close to the confluence.

The largest cities on the Main are Frankfurt am Main, Offenbach am Main and Würzburg. If the Weser-Werra are considered separate, it is the longest river lying entirely in Germany.

== Geography ==
The Main flows through the north and north-west of the state of Bavaria and then across southern Hesse; against the latter it demarcates a third state, Baden-Württemberg, east and west of Wertheim am Main, the northernmost town of that state.

The upper end of its basin opposes that of the Danube where the watershed is recognised by natural biologists, sea salinity studies (and hydrology science more broadly) as the European Watershed.

The Main begins near Kulmbach in Franconia at the joining of its two headstreams, the Red Main (Roter Main) and the White Main (Weißer Main). The Red Main originates in the Franconian Jura mountain range, 50 km (31 mi) in length, and runs through Creussen and Bayreuth. The White Main originates in the Fichtel Mountains; it is 41 km (25 mi) long. In its upper and middle section, the Main runs through the valleys of the German Highlands. Its lower section crosses the Lower Main Lowlands (Hanau-Seligenstadt Basin and northern Upper Rhine Plain) to Wiesbaden, where it discharges into the Rhine. Major tributaries of the Main are the Regnitz, the Franconian Saale, the Tauber, and the Nidda.

The name Main originates from Latin Moenis, Moenus or Menus. It is not related to the name of the city Mainz (Latin: Mogontiacum or Moguntiacum).

== Navigation ==
The Main is navigable for shipping from its mouth at the Rhine close to Mainz for 396 km (246 mi) to Bamberg. Since 1992, the Main has been connected to the Danube via the Rhine-Main-Danube Canal and the highly regulated Altmühl river. The Main has been canalized with 34 large locks (300 × 12 m or 984 × 39 ft) to allow CEMT class V vessels (110 × 11.45 m or 360.9 × 37.6 ft) to navigate the total length of the river. The 16 locks in the adjacent Rhine-Main-Danube Canal and the Danube itself are of the same dimensions.

=== Weirs and locks ===
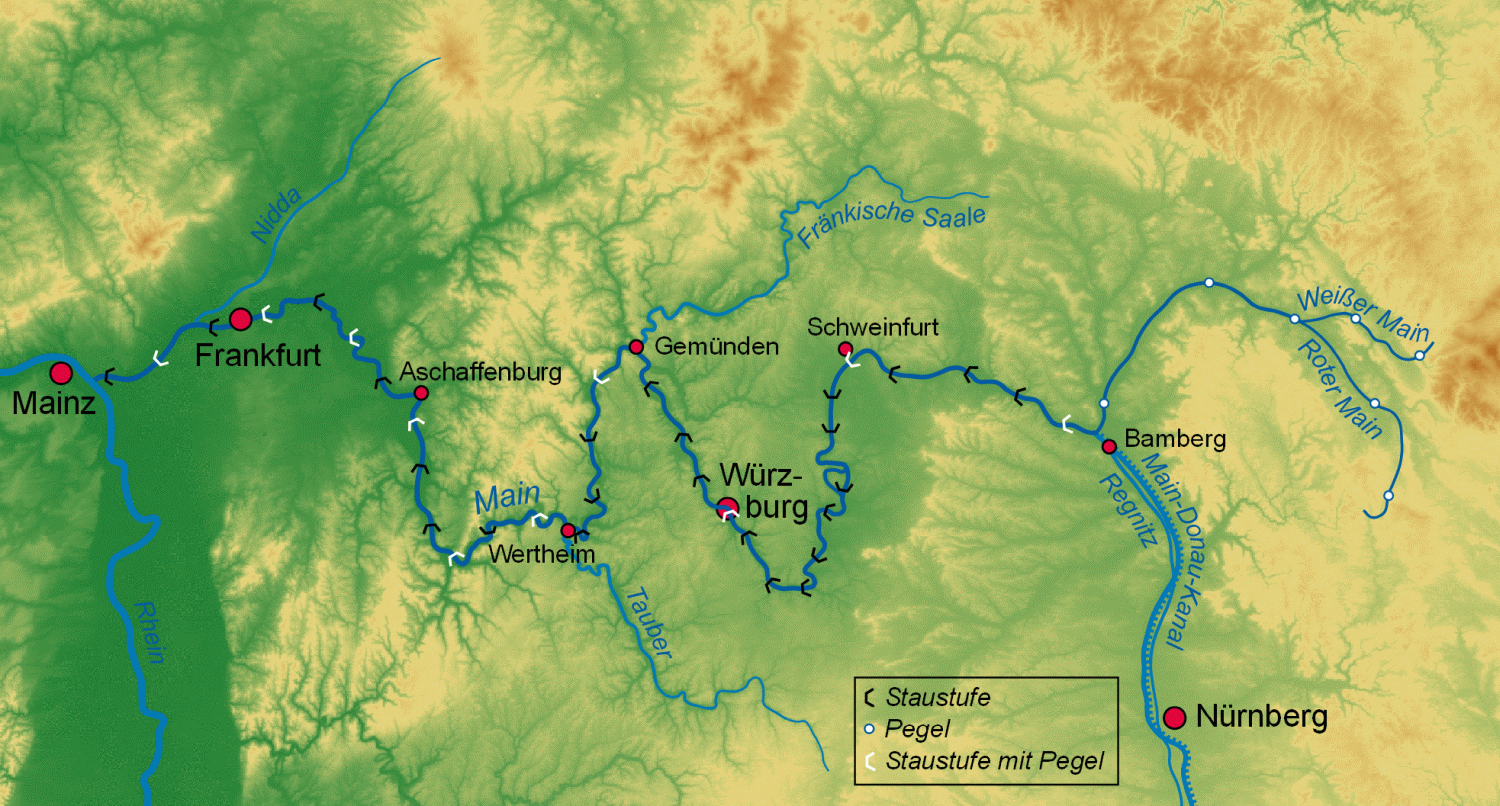
Dams along the Main

There are 34 weirs and locks along the 380 km navigable portion of the Main, from the confluence with the Regnitz near Bamberg, to the Rhine.

- No.: Number of the lock (from upstream to downstream).
- Name: Name of the lock.
- Location: City or town where the lock is located.
- Year built: Year when the lock was put into operation (replacement dates are also listed where applicable).
- Main-km: Location on the Main, measured from the 0 km stone in Mainz-Kostheim. The reference point is the center of the lock or lock group.
- Distance between locks: length in km of impoundment (between adjacent locks).
- Altitude: Height in meters above mean sea level of the upper water at normal levels.
- Height: Height of the dam in meters (the height of the Kostheim lock depends on the water level of the Rhine).
- Lock length: Usable length of the lock chamber in meters.
- Lock width: Usable width of the lock chamber in meters.

No.	Name	Location	Year built	Main-km	Distance between locks (km)	Altitude (m)	Height (m)	Lock length (m)	Lock width (m)
1	Viereth	Viereth-Trunstadt	1925	380.699		230.86	6.00	289.80	12.00
2	Limbach	Eltmann	1951	367.176	13.523	224.86	5.36	299.10	12.00
3	Knetzgau	Knetzgau (Haßfurt)	1958	359.781	7.395	219.50	4.24	298.85	12.00
4	Ottendorf	Gädheim	1962	345.263	14.518	215.26	7.59	301.60	12.00
5	Schweinfurt	Schweinfurt	1963	332.037	13.226	207.67	4.67	300.60	12.00
6	Garstadt	Bergrheinfeld	1956	323.503	8.534	203.00	4.69	299.75	12.00
7	Wipfeld	Wipfeld	1950	316.289	7.214	198.31	4.31	300.15	12.00
8	Gerlachshausen mit Volkach	Volkach (Schwarzach am Main)	1957	300.506	15.783	194.00	6.30	300.00	12.00
9	Dettelbach	Dettelbach	1959	295.398	5.108	187.70	5.50	299.35	12.00
10	Kitzingen	Kitzingen	1956	283.979	11.419	182.20	3.66	299.80	12.00
11	Marktbreit	Marktbreit (Frickenhausen am Main)	1955	275.681	8.298	178.54	3.31	296.40	12.00
12	Goßmannsdorf	Ochsenfurt	1952	269.028	6.653	175.23	3.40	296.90	12.00
13	Randersacker	Würzburg (Randersacker)	1950	258.885	10.143	171.83	3.30	299.60	12.00
14	Würzburg	Würzburg	1954	252.512	6.373	168.53	2.75	293.10	12.00
15	Erlabrunn	Erlabrunn (Thüngersheim)	1935	241.204	11.308	165.78	4.15	299.20	12.00
16	Himmelstadt	Himmelstadt	1939	232.290	8.914	161.63	4.30	299.50	12.00
17	Harrbach	Karlstadt (Gemünden am Main)	1939	219.466	12.824	157.33	4.90	299.45	12.00
18	Steinbach	Lohr am Main	1939	200.673	18.793	152.43	5.14	299.10	12.00
19	Rothenfels	Rothenfels (Marktheidenfeld)	1937	185.887	14.786	147.29	5.26	298.45	12.00
20	Lengfurt	Triefenstein	1937	174.508	11.379	142.03	3.99	300.08	11.98
21	Eichel	Wertheim	1937	160.467	14.041	138.04	4.50	299.92	12.00
22	Faulbach	Wertheim (Faulbach)	1935	147.065	13.402	133.54	4.51	299.80	12.10
23	Freudenberg	Collenberg (Freudenberg)	1934	133.948	13.117	129.03	4.51	300.00	12.00
24	Heubach	Großheubach (Miltenberg)	1932	122.360	11.588	124.52	4.00	300.00	12.00
25	Klingenberg	Klingenberg am Main	1930	113.050	9.310	120.52	4.00	300.71	12.05
26	Wallstadt	Kleinwallstadt (Großwallstadt)	1930	101.203	11.847	116.52	4.00	299.93	12.00
27	Obernau	Niedernberg (Aschaffenburg)	1930	92.909	8.294	112.52	4.01	299.18	12.00
28	Kleinostheim	Kleinostheim (Stockstadt am Main)	1920; 1972	77.905	15.004	108.51	6.80	298.36; 298.22	12.04; 12.02
29	Krotzenburg	Hainburg (Großkrotzenburg)	1920; 1983	63.850	14.055	101.71	2.74	302.30; 300.01	12.00; 12.00
30	Mühlheim (formerly Kesselstadt)	Maintal (Mühlheim am Main)	1920; 1980	53.185	10.385	98.97	3.77	299.90	12.04
31	Offenbach	Frankfurt am Main (Offenbach am Main)	1901; 1957	38.514	14.671	95.20	3.18	344.03; 230.07	12.09; 13.05
32	Griesheim	Frankfurt am Main	1934	28.687	9.827	92.02	4.49	344.05; 344.38	12.00; 15.00
33	Eddersheim	Hattersheim am Main (Kelsterbach)	1934	15.551	13.136	87.53	3.61	345.46; 344.26	12.05; 15.05
34	Kostheim	Hochheim am Main (Ginsheim-Gustavsburg)	1886; 1934	3.209	12.342	83.92	2.36 (MW Rhine)	341.90; 339.02	15.00; Door: 12.00; Chamber: 20.00

=== Hydroelectric power generation ===
Most of the weirs or dams along the Main also have turbines for power generation.

- No.: Number of the dam/weir (from upstream to downstream).
- Name: Name of the dam/weir.
- Height: Height of the dam/weir in meters (the height of the Kostheim dam depends on the water level of the Rhine).
- Power: Maximum power generation capacity in megawatts.
- Turbines: Type and number of turbines.
- Operator: Operator of the hydroelectric plant.

No.	Name	Height (m)	Power (MW)	Turbines	Operator
1	Viereth	6.00	6.20	Francis(3), Kaplan(1)	E.ON Wasserkraft
2	Limbach	5.36	3.70	Kaplan(2)	E.ON Wasserkraft
3	Knetzgau	4.24	2.90	Kaplan(2)	E.ON Wasserkraft
4	Ottendorf	7.59	6.30	Kaplan(2)	E.ON Wasserkraft
5	Schweinfurt	4.67	3.80	Kaplan(2)	E.ON Wasserkraft
6	Garstadt	4.69	3.90	Kaplan(2)	E.ON Wasserkraft
7	Wipfeld	4.31	2.90	Kaplan(2)	E.ON Wasserkraft
8	Gerlachshausen mit Volkach	6.30	3.90	Kaplan(2)	E.ON Wasserkraft
9	Dettelbach	5.50	4.20	Kaplan(2)	E.ON Wasserkraft
10	Kitzingen	3.66	3.00	Kaplan(2)	E.ON Wasserkraft
11	Marktbreit	3.31	2.10	Kaplan(2)	E.ON Wasserkraft
12	Goßmannsdorf	3.40	2.00	Kaplan(2)	E.ON Wasserkraft
13	Randersacker	3.30	2.00	Kaplan(2)	E.ON Wasserkraft
14	Würzburg	2.75	0.90	Kaplan(3)	E.ON Wasserkraft
15	Erlabrunn	4.15	2.70	Kaplan(1)	E.ON Wasserkraft
16	Himmelstadt	4.30	2.50	Kaplan(1)	E.ON Wasserkraft
17	Harrbach	4.90	3.00	Kaplan(2)	E.ON Wasserkraft
18	Steinbach	5.14	4.20	Kaplan(2)	E.ON Wasserkraft
19	Rothenfels	5.26	4.20	Kaplan(2)	E.ON Wasserkraft
20	Lengfurt	3.99	2.60		E.ON Wasserkraft
21	Eichel	4.50	3.10		E.ON Wasserkraft
22	Faulbach	4.51	4.10		E.ON Wasserkraft
23	Freudenberg	4.51	4.30		E.ON Wasserkraft
24	Heubach	4.00	3.40		E.ON Wasserkraft
25	Klingenberg	4.00	3.00		E.ON Wasserkraft
26	Wallstadt	4.00	3.40		E.ON Wasserkraft
27	Obernau	4.01	3.20		E.ON Wasserkraft
28	Kleinostheim	6.80	9.70		E.ON Wasserkraft
29	Krotzenburg	2.74	—		
30	Mühlheim	3.77	4.80		E.ON Wasserkraft
31	Offenbach	3.18	4.10		E.ON Wasserkraft
32	Griesheim	4.49	4.90	Kaplan(3)	Wasser- und Schifffahrtsamt Aschaffenburg
33	Eddersheim	3.61	3.84	Kaplan(3)	Wasser- und Schifffahrtsamt Aschaffenburg
34	Kostheim	2.36	4.9	Kaplan Pit-Rohrturbinen(2)	WKW Staustufe Kostheim/Main GmbH & Co. KG (Gebaut und Betrieben von Stadtwerke Ulm/Neu-Ulm)

== Tributaries ==
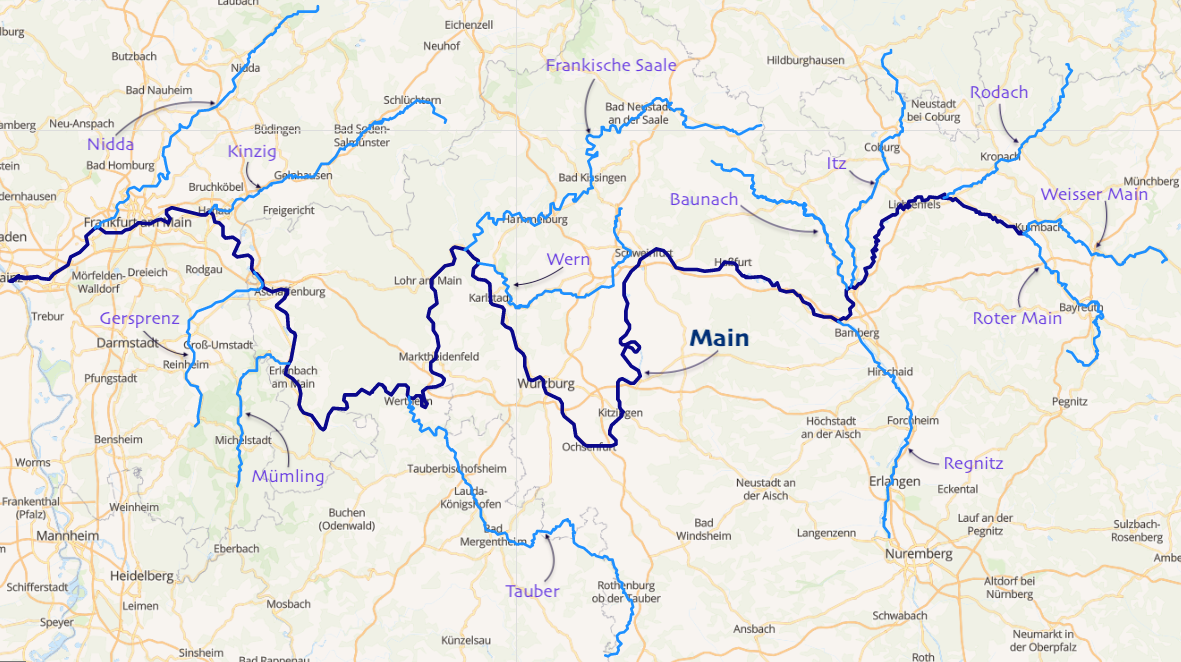
The Main and its main tributaries

Tributaries from source to mouth:

Left

- Regnitz
- Tauber
- Mümling

Right

- Rodach (Main)
- Itz
- Franconian Saale
- Aschaff
- Kahl
- Kinzig
- Nidda

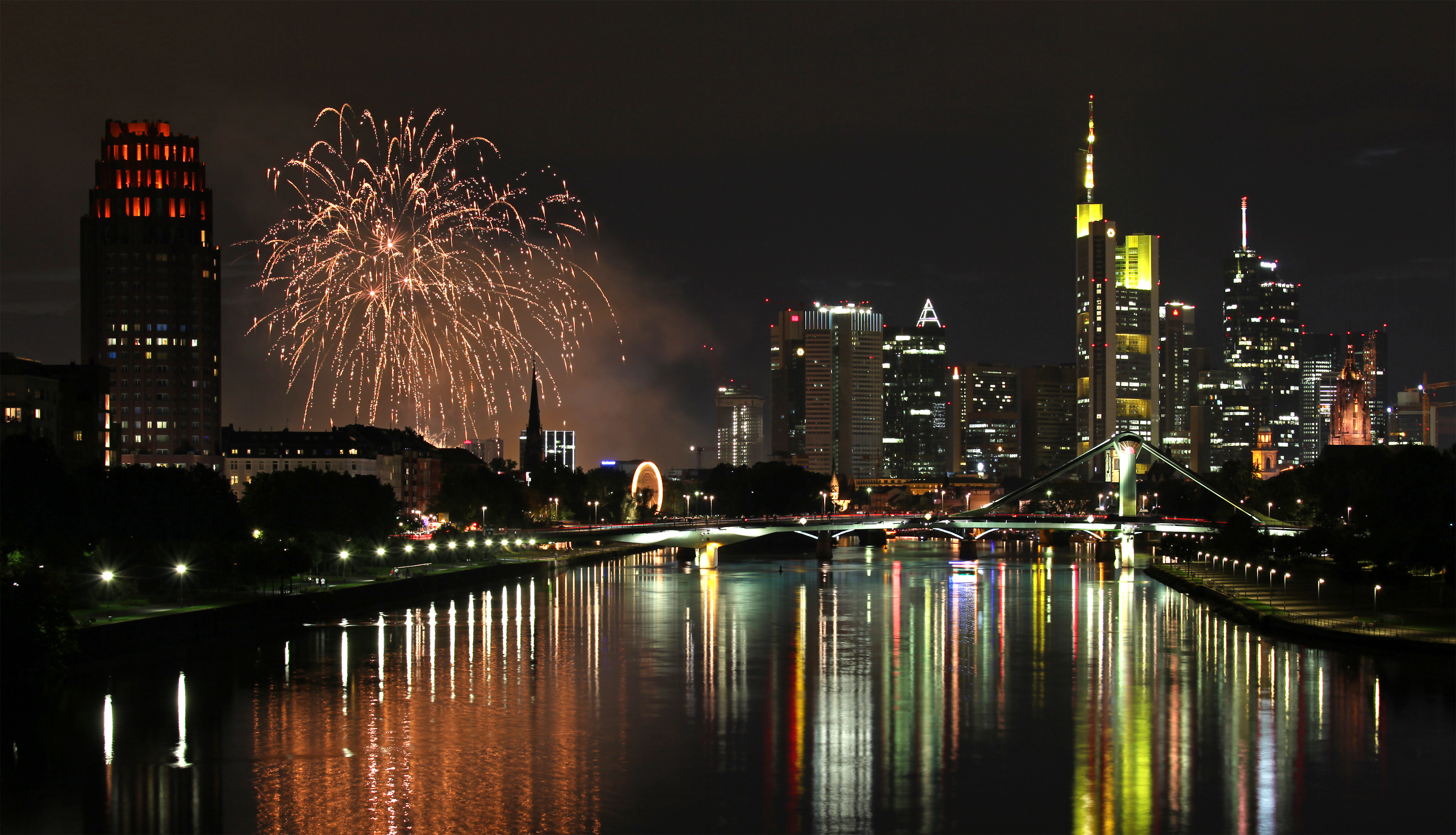
The Main in Frankfurt at night

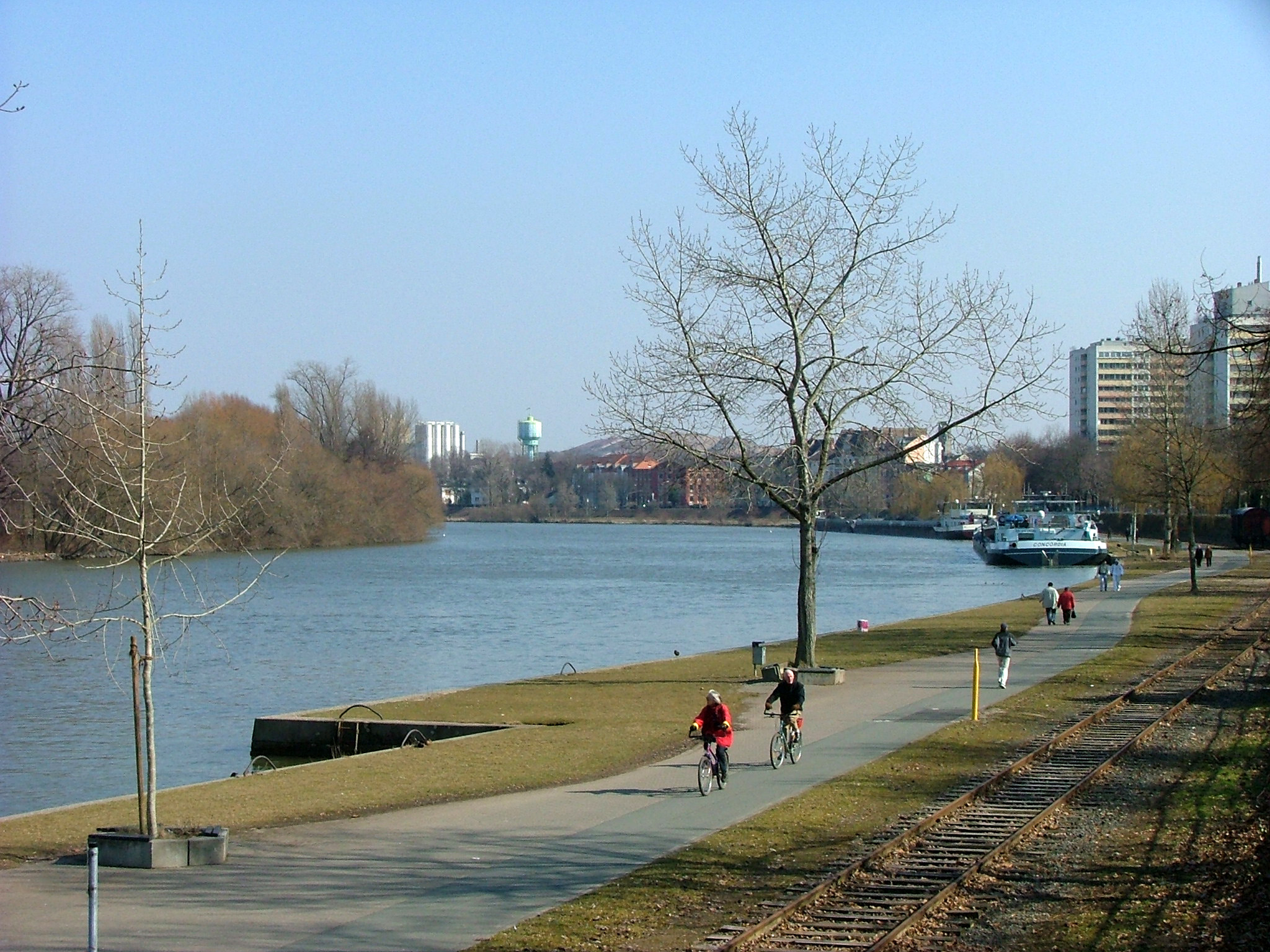
The Main in Offenbach am Main

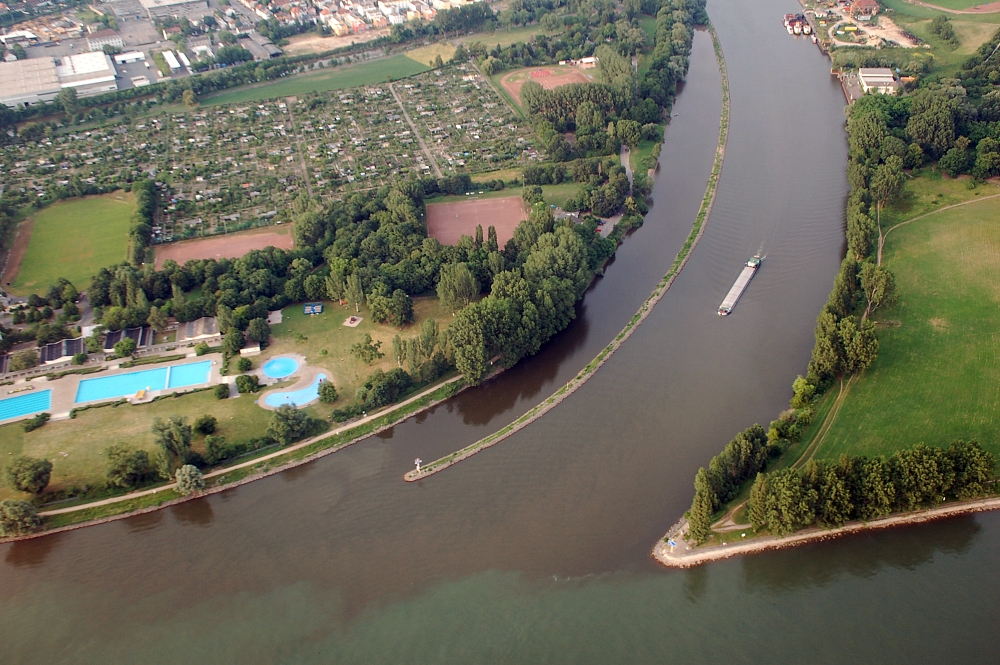
Confluence into the Rhine at Mainz-Kostheim

== Ports and municipalities ==
Around Frankfurt are several large inland ports. Because the river is rather narrow on many of the upper reaches, navigation with larger vessels and push convoys requires great skill.

The largest cities along the Main are Frankfurt am Main, Offenbach am Main and Würzburg. The Main also passes the following towns: Burgkunstadt, Lichtenfels, Bad Staffelstein, Eltmann, Haßfurt, Schweinfurt, Volkach, Kitzingen, Marktbreit, Ochsenfurt, Karlstadt, Gemünden, Lohr, Marktheidenfeld, Wertheim, Miltenberg, Obernburg, Erlenbach/Main, Aschaffenburg, Seligenstadt, Hainburg, Hanau, Hattersheim, Flörsheim, and Rüsselsheim.

The river has gained enormous importance as a vital part of European "Corridor VII", the inland waterway link from the North Sea to the Black Sea.

== Main line ==
In a historical and political sense, the Main line is referred to as the northern border of Southern Germany, with its predominantly Catholic population. The river roughly marked the southern border of the North German Federation, established in 1867 under Prussian leadership as the predecessor of the German Empire.

The river course also corresponds with the Speyer line isogloss between Central and Upper German dialects, sometimes mocked as Weißwurstäquator.

== Recreation ==
The Main-Radweg is a major German bicycle path alongside the river. Approximately 600 kilometres long (370 mi), it is the first long-distance instance awarded 5 stars by the General German Bicycle Club (ADFC) in 2008. It starts from Creußen or Bischofsgrün and ends in Mainz.

== Sights ==
- Roman camp at Marktbreit

== See also ==
- Chain boat navigation on the Main
- Krassach (River)

== Bibliography ==
- Haus der Bayerischen Geschichte (ed.). Main und Meer: Porträt eines Flusses (in German). Exhibition Catalogue to the Bayerische Landesausstellung 2013 (German). WBG. ISBN 978-3-534-00010-4.
