= Hanau-Seligenstadt Basin =

River Basin

- Basin
- Location: Frankfurt am Main, Germany
- Part of: Upper Rhine Graben
- Age: Cenozoic

The Hanau-Seligenstadt Basin is a subbasin of the Upper Rhine Graben southeast of Frankfurt am Main (Hesse, Bavaria, Germany).

== Location ==
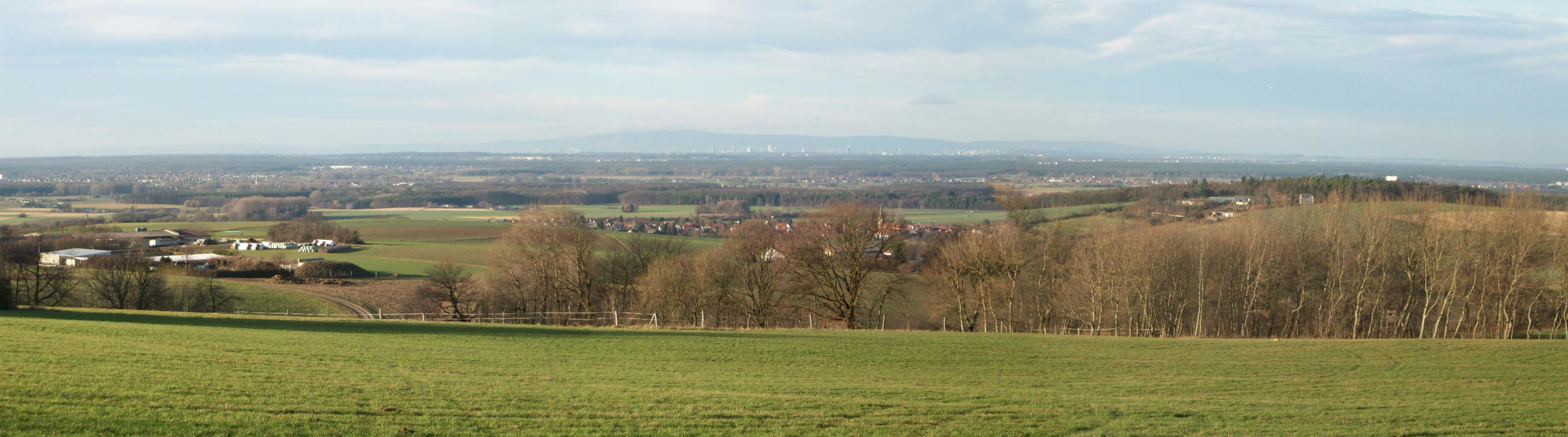
Panorama view of the basin

The Hanau-Seligenstadt Basin is located in the eastern part of the Lower Main lowlands. The river Main crosses the basin between Aschaffenburg and Offenbach am Main. The largest cities of the area are Hanau, Seligenstadt and Dieburg.

== Geologic setting ==
The Hanau-Seligenstadt Basin is a Cenozoic graben. As a subbasin of the Upper Rhine Graben it belongs to the European Cenozoic Rift System, a fracture zone crossing Europe from the North Sea to the Mediterranean.

The Hanau-Seligenstadt Basin is separated from the Upper Rhine Graben to the west by a horst block. The Spessart mountains form its eastern margin. To the south it is bounded by the Odenwald mountains. Towards the north the graben margins converge. The basin sediments rest on top of the Variscan basement and Permian to Triassic rocks. Oligocene to Quaternary basin sediments reach more than 280 m in thickness. Marine, limnic and finally terrestrial clays, marls, limestones and sands with interbedded basalt layers dominate within the Oligocene and Miocene. The Pliocene and Quaternary river deposits consist of sand, gravel and silt, in Pliocene also lignite. The recent landscape is formed by river terraces.

== Evolution ==
From the Triassic until the early Paleogene the later Hanau-Seligenstadt Basin was a non-depositional region. Subsidence started latest during the Oligocene (Rupelian) about 30 million years ago during the evolution of the Upper Rhine Graben. The Upper Rhine Graben Sea and Upper Rhine Graben Lake also covered the Hanau-Seligenstadt Basin. Debris from the local highlands caused silting up and development of a river plain during the Miocene. About 15 million years ago during the Langhian volcanoes poured basaltic lava flows over parts of the area. Still during the Langhian, rivers started to erode their former sediments. In the Pliocene about 5 million years ago the Lower Main river and its tributaries recommenced to deposit sand, gravel and silt. In lakes and swamps also clay layers and lignite developed. The still relatively short river Main tapped the Upper Main in the early Quaternary. The resulting large river transported much sand and gravel into the Hanau-Seligenstadt Basin. During the Middle Pleistocene rivers started once again to incise into their former sediments. The individual stages of the incision history are preserved as river terraces.

== Resources ==
In the Hanau-Seligenstadt Basin sand, gravel and clay are dug in many pits. Until the 1930s also lignite and until the 1980s Miocene basalts were mined. The sand and gravel deposits are yielding aquifers exploited for water supply.
