= Seligenstadt =

- Town
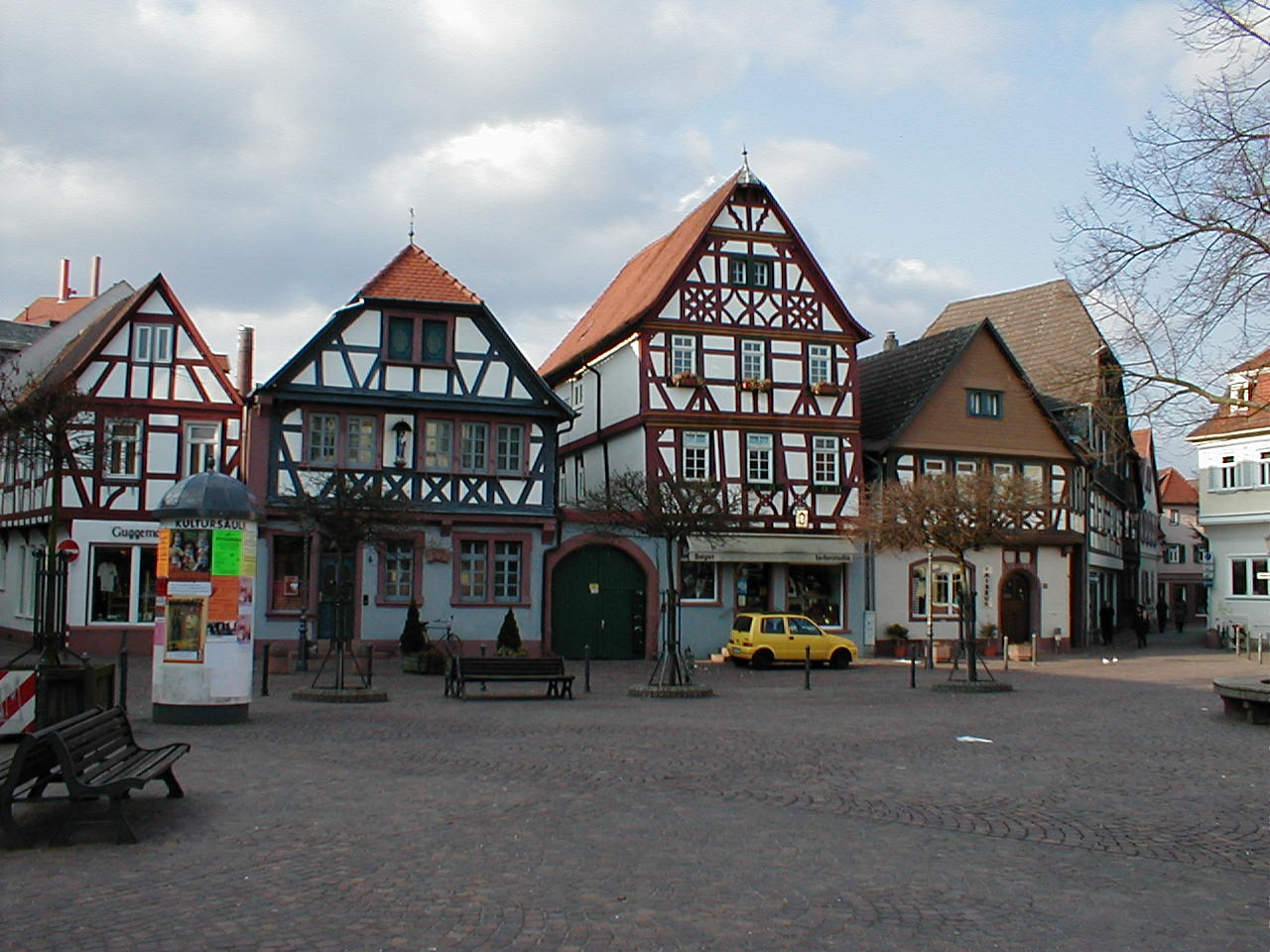
- Marketplace

- Coat of arms

- Location of Seligenstadt within Offenbach district
- Interactive map of Seligenstadt
- Location within Germany Location within Hesse
- Coordinates: 50°02′N 8°58′E
- Country: Germany
- State: Hesse
- Admin. region: Darmstadt
- District: Offenbach
- Subdivisions: 3 Stadtteile

Government
  - Mayor (2021–27): Daniell Bastian

Area
  - Total: 30.85 km^{2} (11.91 sq mi)
- Elevation: 109–118 m (358–387 ft)

Population (2025-12-31)
  - Total: 21,225
  - Density: 688.0/km^{2} (1,782/sq mi)
- Time zone: UTC+01:00 (CET)
  - Summer (DST): UTC+02:00 (CEST)
- Postal codes: 63500
- Dialling codes: 06182
- Vehicle registration: OF
- Website: www.seligenstadt.de

Seligenstadt (German pronunciation: [ˈzeːlɪɡn̩ˌʃtat]) is a town in the Offenbach district in the Regierungsbezirk of Darmstadt in Hesse, Germany. Seligenstadt is one of Germany's oldest towns and was already of great importance in Carolingian times.

== Geography ==
=== Location ===
Seligenstadt is one of 13 towns and communities in the Offenbach district. The town lies on the river Main’s left bank roughly 25 km southeast of Frankfurt am Main, directly neighbouring Bavaria.

=== Neighbouring communities ===
Seligenstadt borders in the north on the community of Hainburg, in the east on the community of Karlstein (Aschaffenburg district in Bavaria), in the southeast on the community of Mainhausen, in the south on the town of Babenhausen (Darmstadt-Dieburg) and in the west on the town of Rodgau.

=== Constituent communities ===
Seligenstadt's Stadtteile are Seligenstadt, Klein-Welzheim and Froschhausen.

=== Geology ===
Seligenstadt is located in the Hanau-Seligenstadt Basin, a Cenozoic subsidence basin between the local highlands of Spessart and Odenwald. Quaternary fluvial deposits of the river Main overlying Pliocene, lignite bearing sequences and Miocene sands and marls form the subsurface of the town.

== History ==
=== Antiquity ===
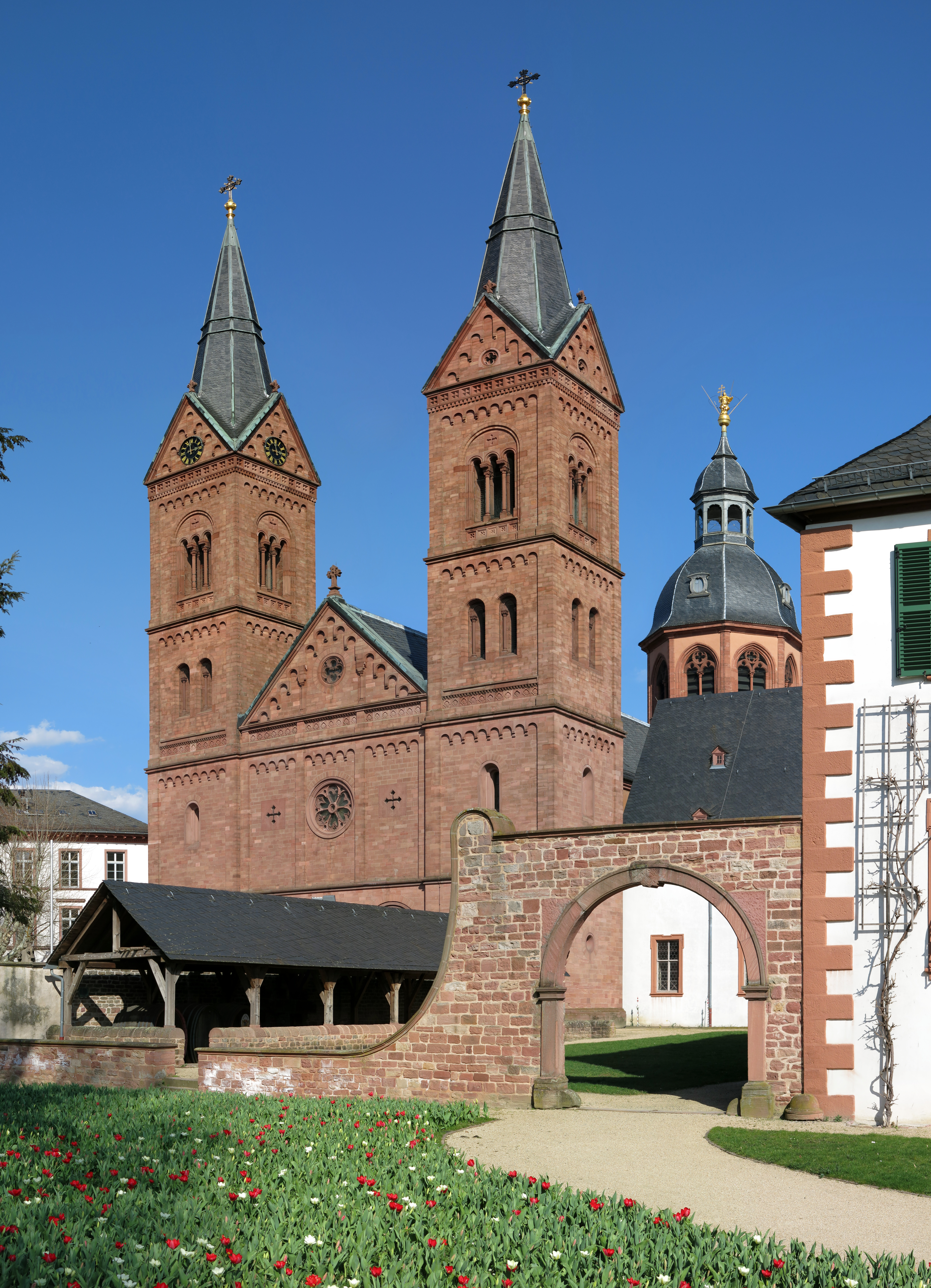
The Einhard-Basilika's façade as seen today

Sometime about AD 100, during the reign of Roman Emperor Trajan, a cohort castrum was built on what is now Seligenstadt's marketplace and parts of its old town. Since the 16th century, this castrum has been referred to by the name Selgum. The 500 legionaries and auxiliary forces stationed there belonged to the Legio XXII Primigenia (or Roman 22nd Legion), based in Mogontiacum (Mainz). The cohort was known by the name Cohors I Civium Romanorum equitata and was responsible for security along the stretch of the Limes Germanicus running along the Main. With the fall of the Limes as a result of raids by the Alamanni in about AD 260, the castrum was abandoned, and the Romans withdrew farther behind the Rhine line. On the former castrum's rubble and on what is now the monastery area in a section of the Breitenbach valley arose the early mediaeval settlement of Mulinheim superior, or Obermühlheim.

=== Middle Ages ===
Seligenstadt had its first documentary mention on 11 January 815 in a donation document, under its then current name of Obermühlheim. The town was founded by Charlemagne’s biographer Einhard. After he had acquired the Frankish settlement of Obermulinheim from Louis the Pious in 815 as a donation, he founded a Benedictine monastery here. Mentioned as an earlier owner is a Count Drogo. The bones of the martyrs Marcellinus and Peter, which had been stolen in Rome, were transferred from the basilica in Steinbach in the Odenwald to Obermühlheim, soon leading to a change in the community’s name from Obermühlheim to Seligenstadt ("town of the blessed ones" in German). About 830, building work began on the Einhard-Basilika, the current version of which is now the landmark of Seligenstadt. Einhard died in 840 and he and his partner, Imma, are buried in a chapel in the northern transept of the church.

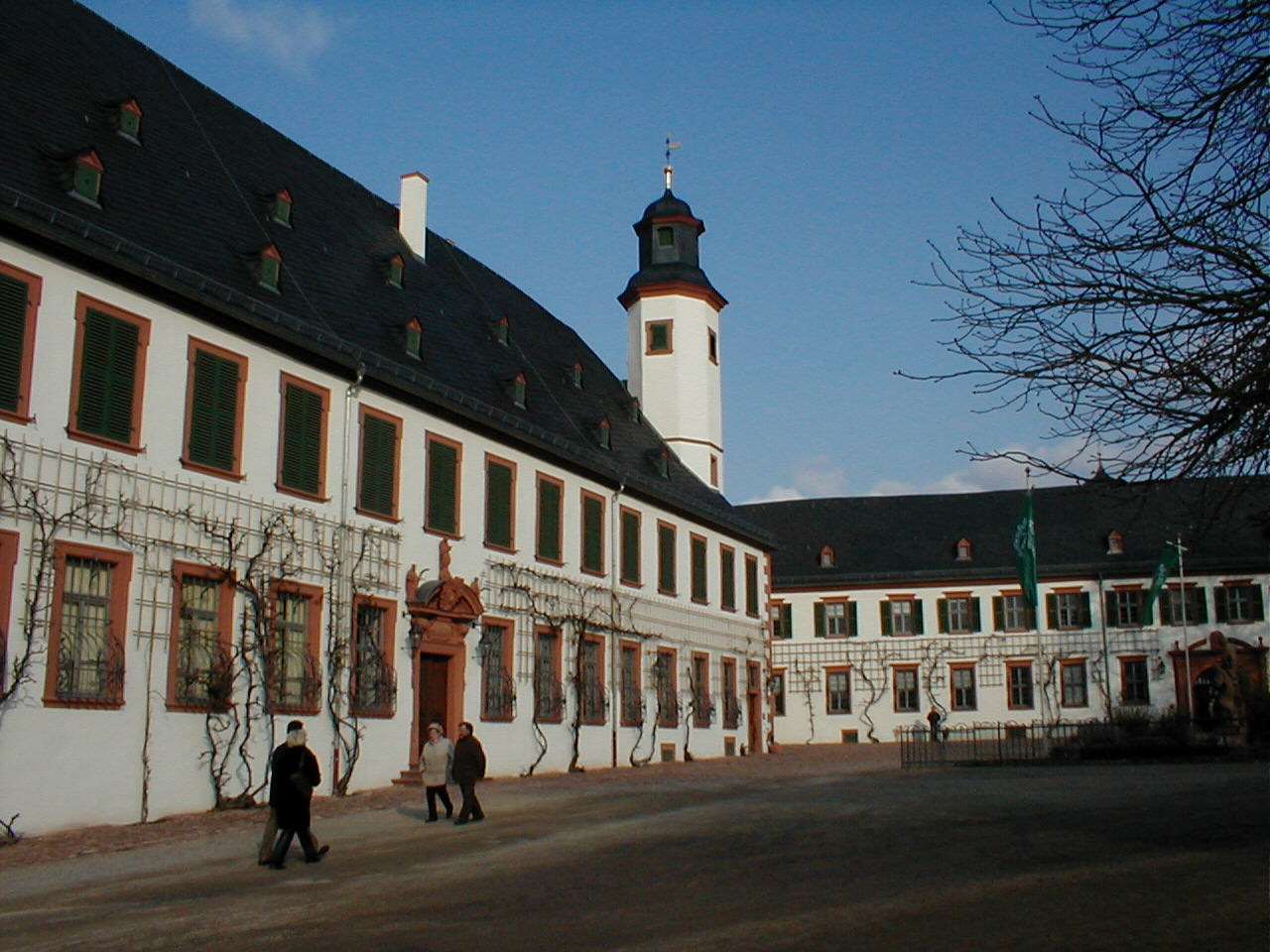
Former Benedictine abbey in Seligenstadt

In 1028, a Roman Catholic synod was held, whose most important result was the introduction of ember days with their strict rules for fasting. In 1063, Emperor Heinrich IV confirmed to the Archbishop of Mainz the lawfulness of his ownership of the abbey.

Emperor Friedrich Barbarossa held court in Seligenstadt in 1188. During his reign the community acquired town rights (around 1175). A royal court (or Kaiserpfalz) was built on the banks of the Main during the reign of the Staufer family, however it is not certain whether this occurred under Barbarossa or one of his successors, possibly Friedrich II. Until 1309, Seligenstadt was a freie Reichsstadt. At that point, it came to the Archbishop of Mainz who remained the town's ruler until 1803.

=== Reformation and Renaissance ===
In 1527, Archbishop Albert of Mainz brought in a new town order whereby the Seligenstadt townsmen's rights were sharply limited.

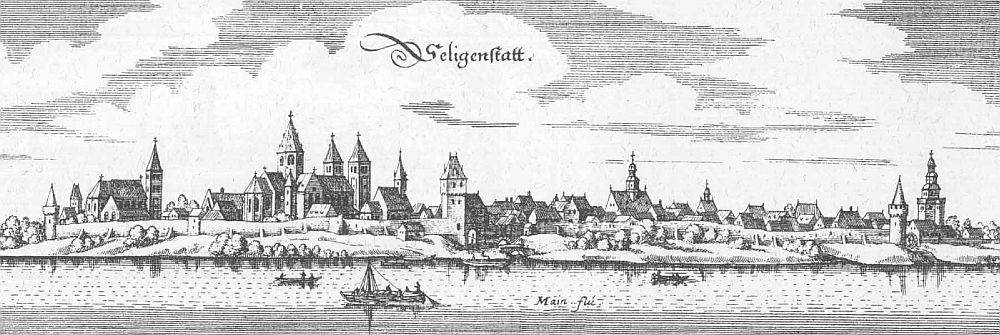
Seligenstadt – extract from Topographia Hassiae by Matthäus Merian the Younger, 1655

During the Thirty Years' War, a Swedish commissary administered the abbey on King Gustav II Adolf's behalf. The Swedish king had spared the town destruction and burning in return for the townsmen's tribute. As he went forth with his army, though, the occupation troops who had been left behind plundered the town and the abbey anyway. In 1685, the abbey and convent buildings were newly built.

=== Modern times ===
Through the secularization of Electoral Mainz in 1803, the Amt of Seligenstadt passed to the Grand Duchy of Hesse-Darmstadt and the abbey was dissolved. In 1832, the Landratsbezirk of Seligenstadt was merged into the Offenbach district and in 1882 the Hanau-Seligenstadt-Eberbach railway opened.

=== Recent times ===
In 1977 in the course of municipal reform in Hesse, the neighbouring communities of Froschhausen and Klein-Welzheim were merged into Seligenstadt.

== Government ==
=== Town council ===
The municipal election held on 26 March 2006 yielded the following results:

Parties and voter communities		% 2021	Seats; 2021	% 2006	Seats; 2006	% 2001	Seats; 2001
CDU	Christian Democratic Union of Germany	34.2	13	51.7	19	50.8	19
SPD	Social Democratic Party of Germany	13.5	5	24.1	9	32.9	12
GREENS	Bündnis 90/Die Grünen	17.6	6	6.5	2	5.9	2
FDP	Free Democratic Party	21.1	8	10.2	4	4.9	2
FWS	Freie Wähler Seligenstadt	10.1	4	7.5	3	5.5	2
LINKE	Die Linke	3.5	1				
Total		100.0	37	100.0	37	100.0	37
Voter turnout in %		56.6		47.6		56.0	

The town council has four boards:

1. Board for youth, social services, sport and culture
2. Board for building and planning
3. Board for environment and transport
4. Main, financial and economic promotion board

=== Town twinning ===
- Triel-sur-Seine, Yvelines, France since 1967
- Brookfield, Wisconsin, United States since 2 September 2008
- Piedimonte Matese, Italy since October September 2010

In March 2008, the partnership with the Dutch community of Heel, which had existed since 1972, was ended by the community of Maasgouw, into which the former communities of Heel, Maasbracht and Thorn were amalgamated on 1 January 2007. The partnership with Heel went back to the partnership between the formerly self-administering community of Klein-Welzheim, now part of Seligenstadt, and the Dutch community of Wessem, which belonged to Heel then.

== Main sights ==
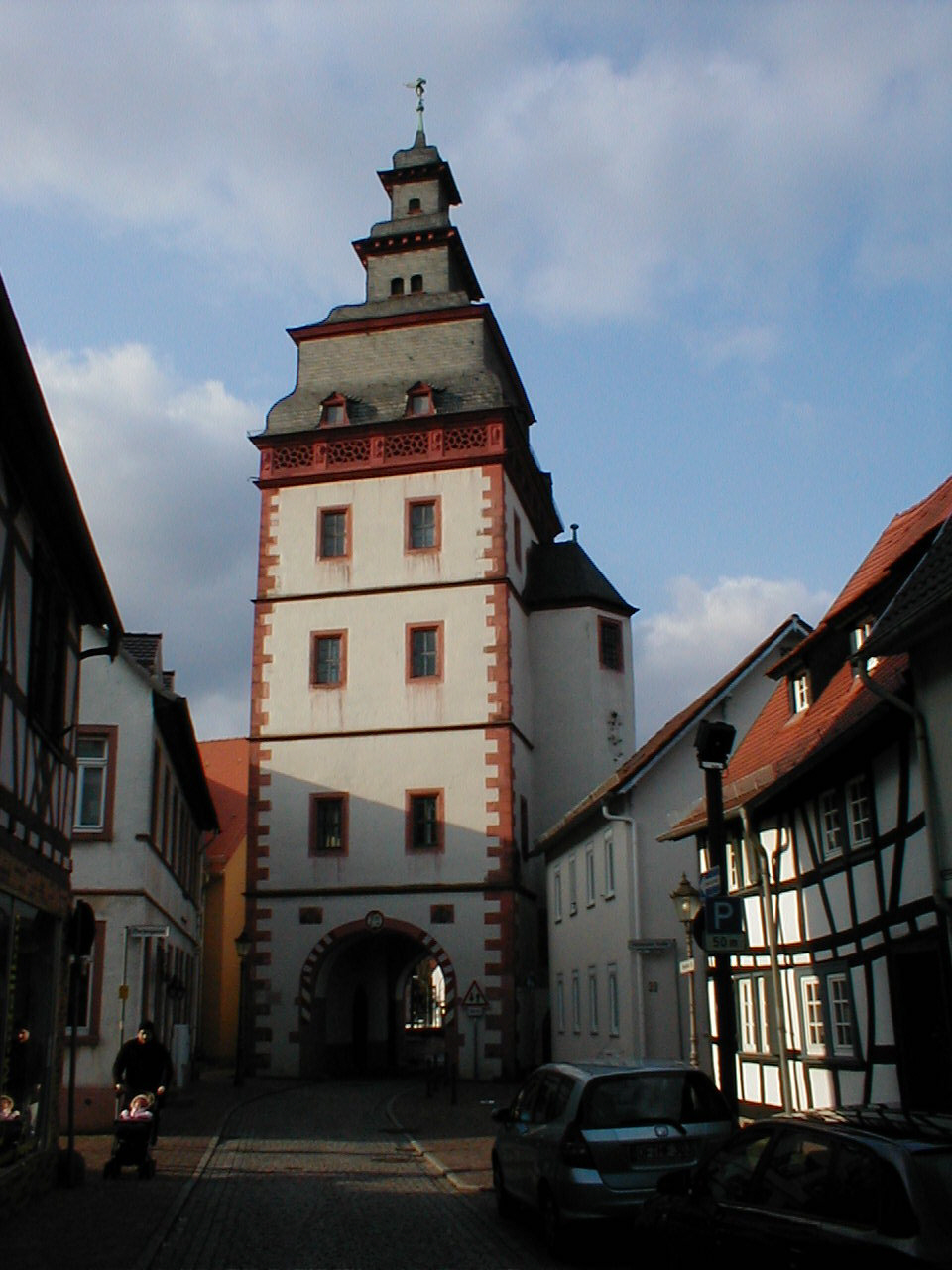
Steinheim gate tower in the town wall

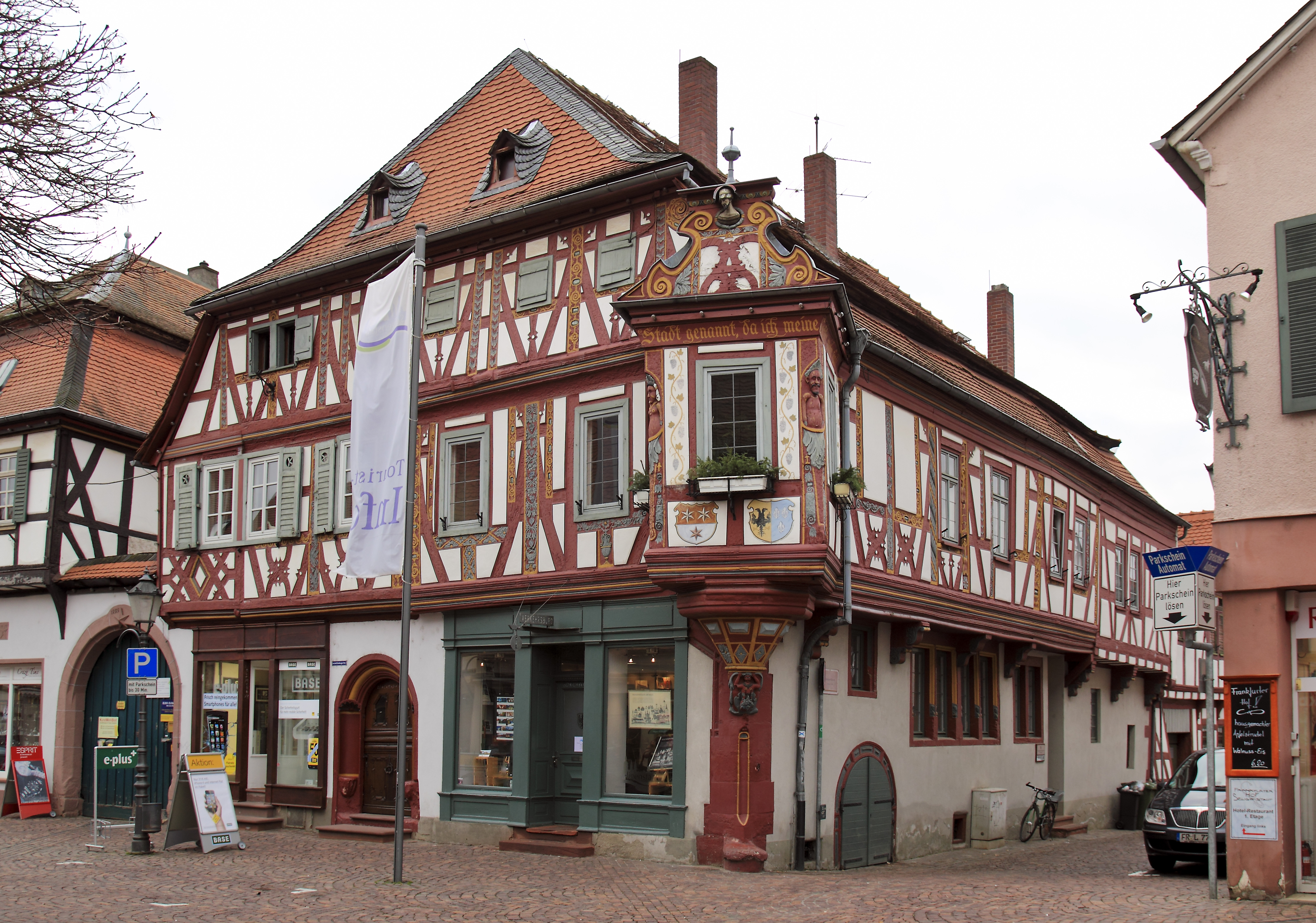
So-called Einhardhaus (1596)

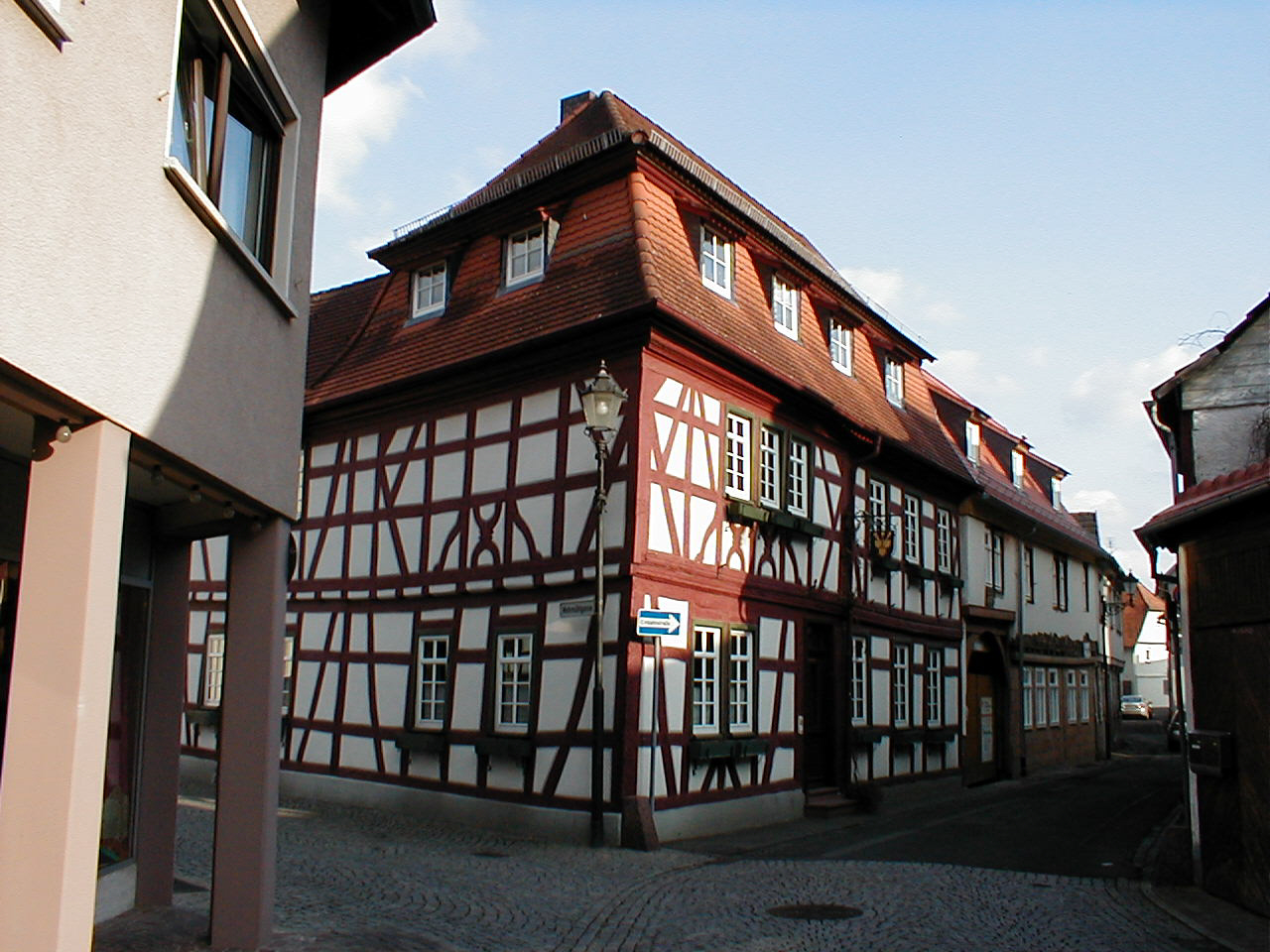
Row of houses in the old town

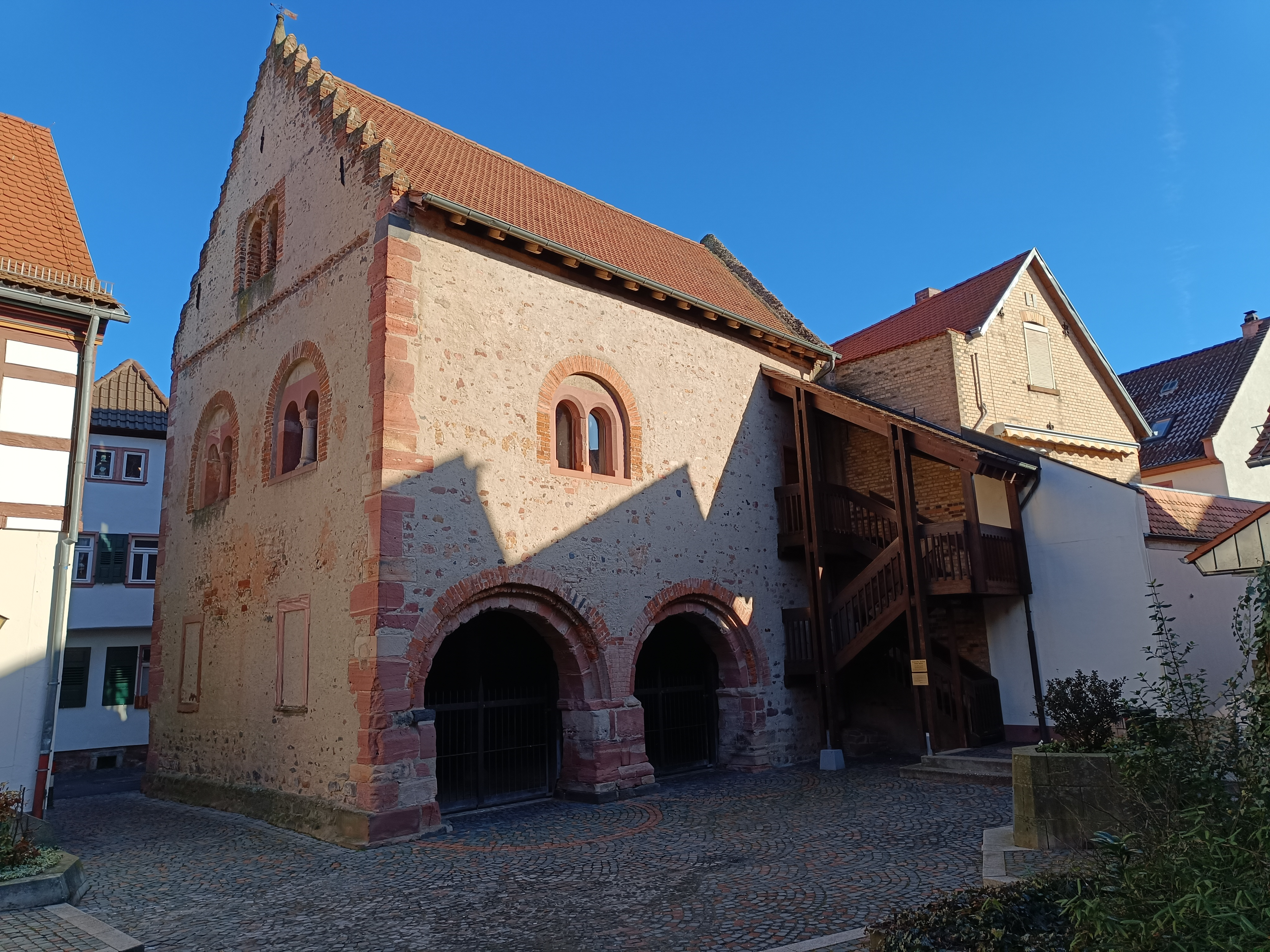
Romanisches Haus

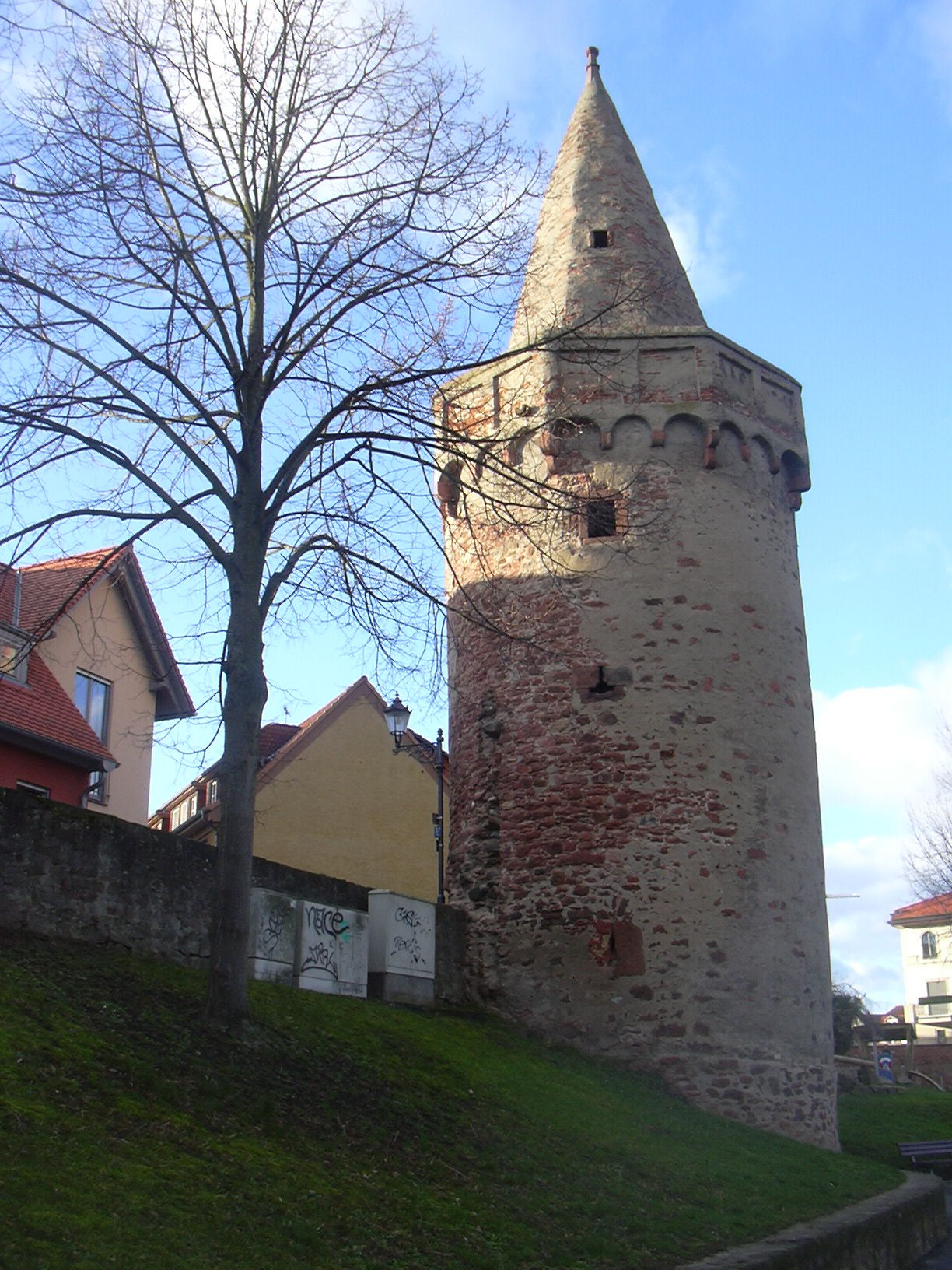
Town wall with Bollwerksturm

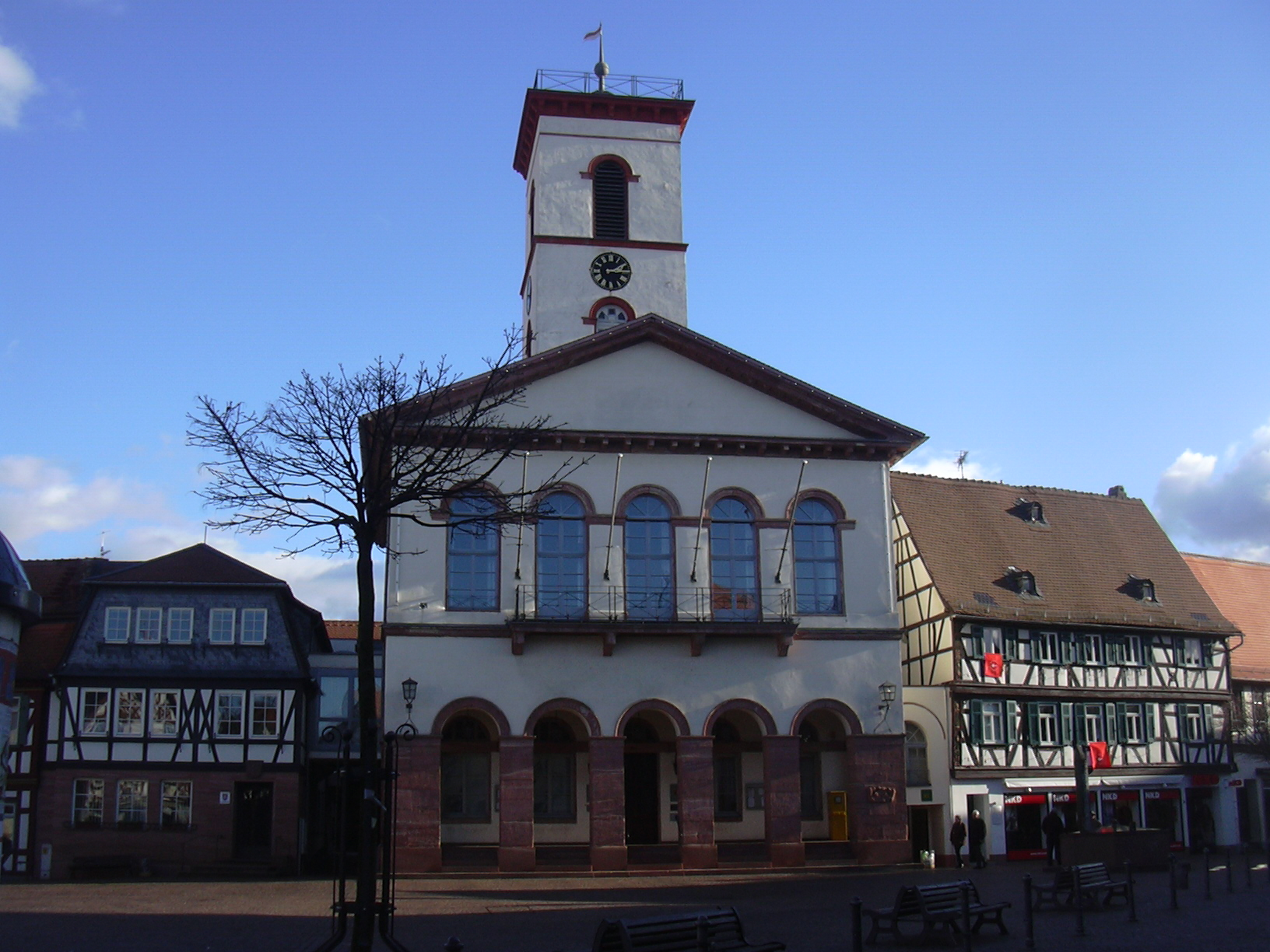
Town hall on market square

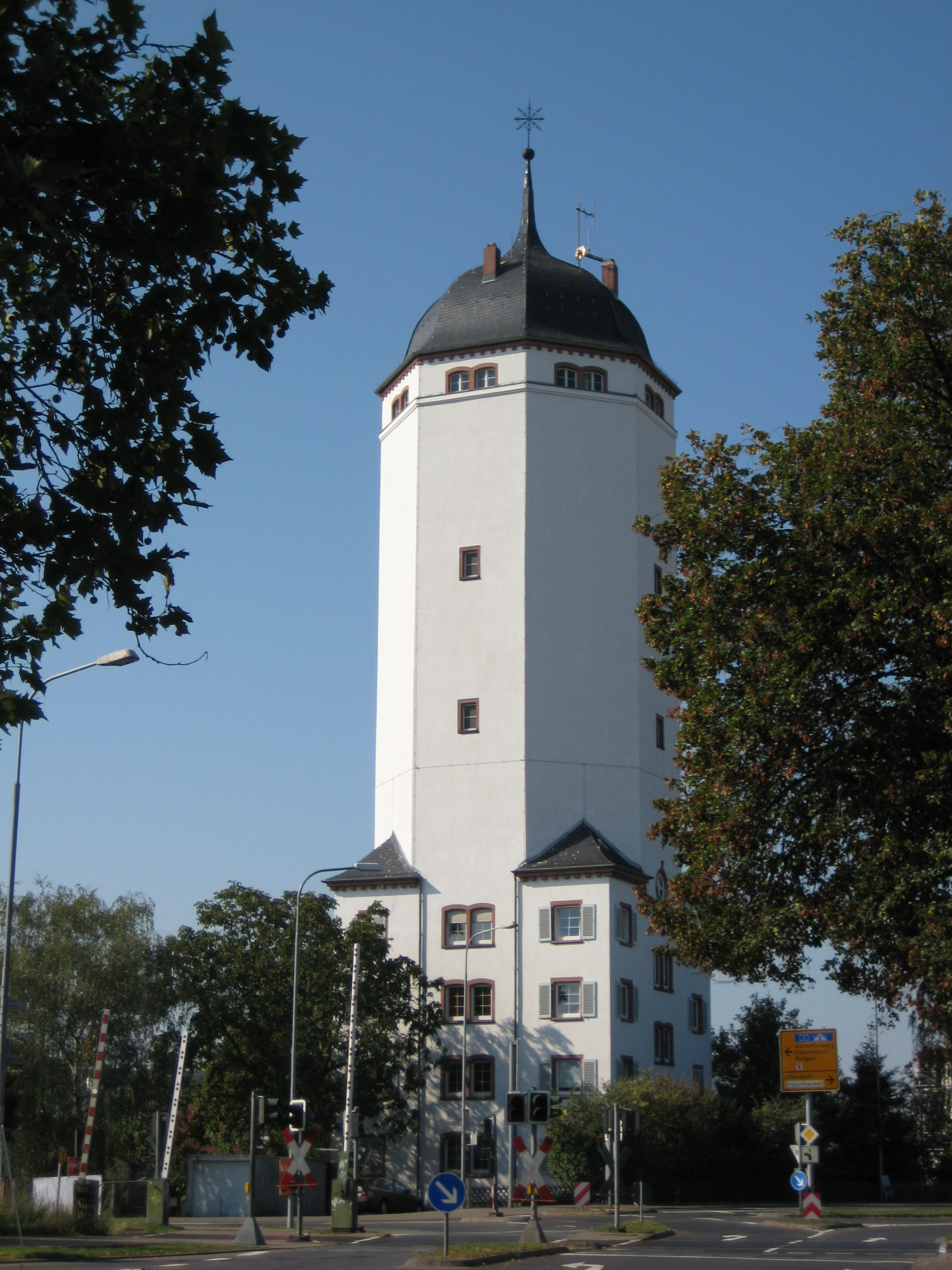
Water tower of Seligenstadt

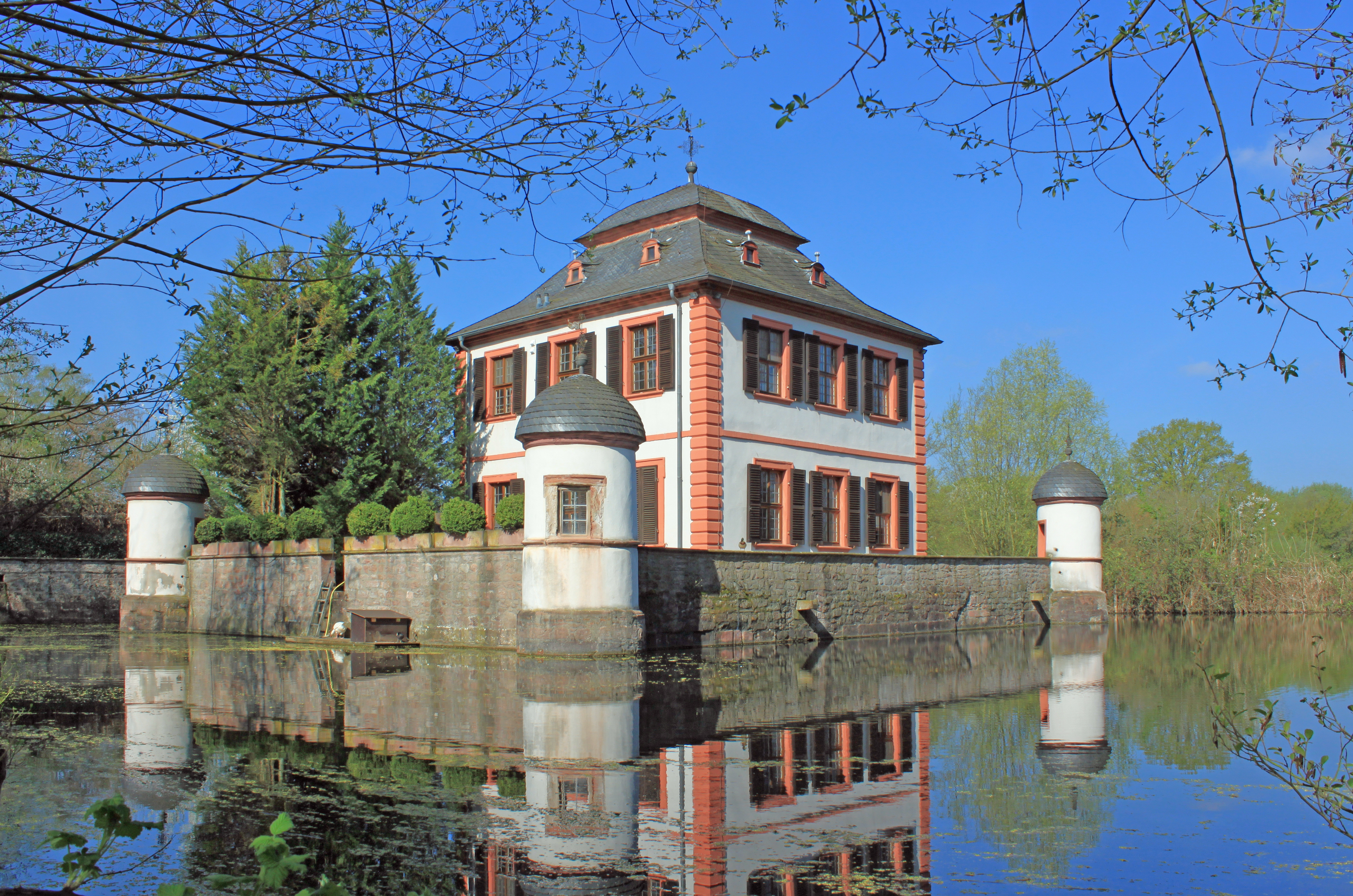
Wasserburg (former abbot's lodge) in quarter Klein-Welzheim

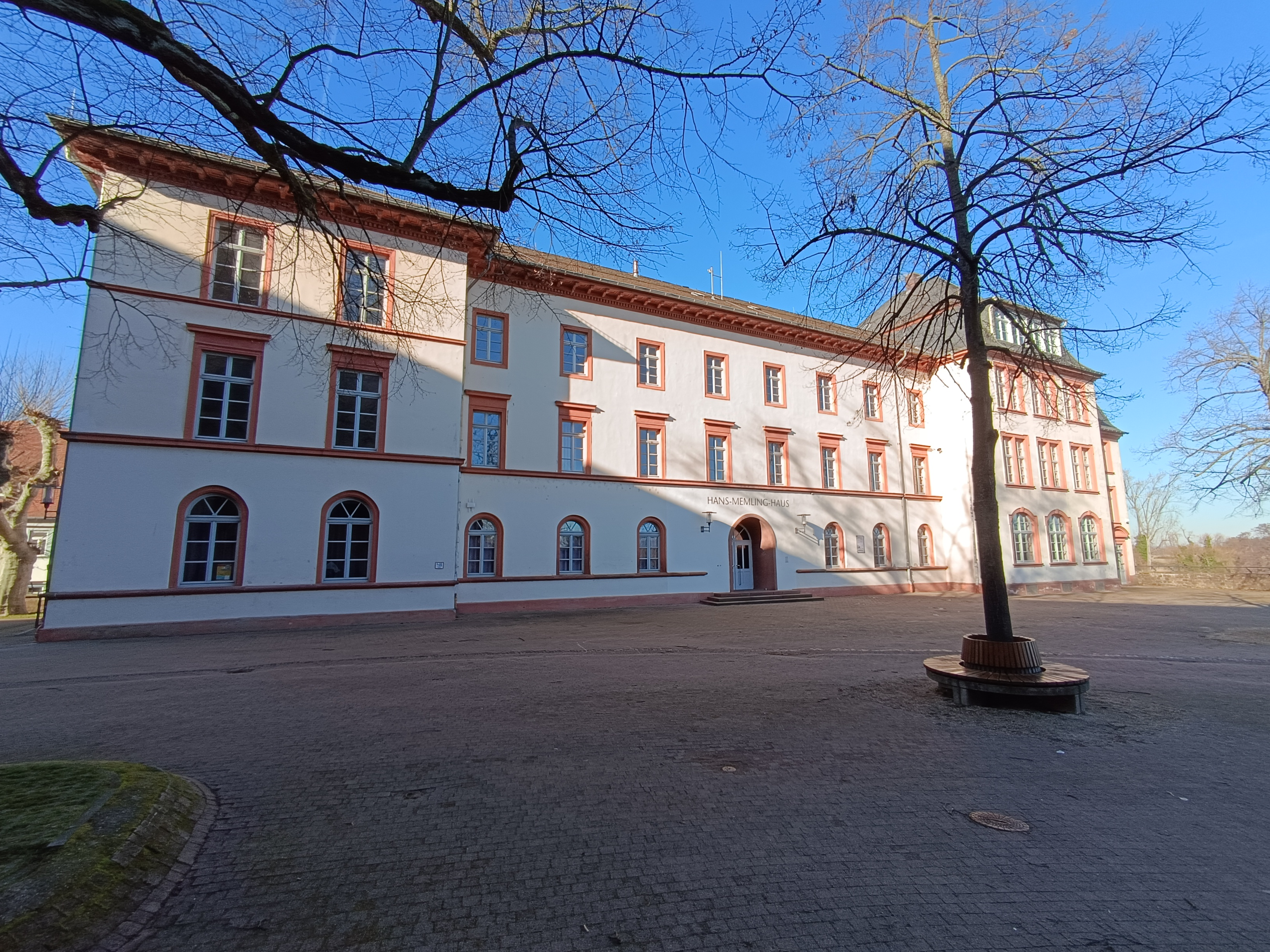
Hans Memling House

=== Einhard-Basilika ===
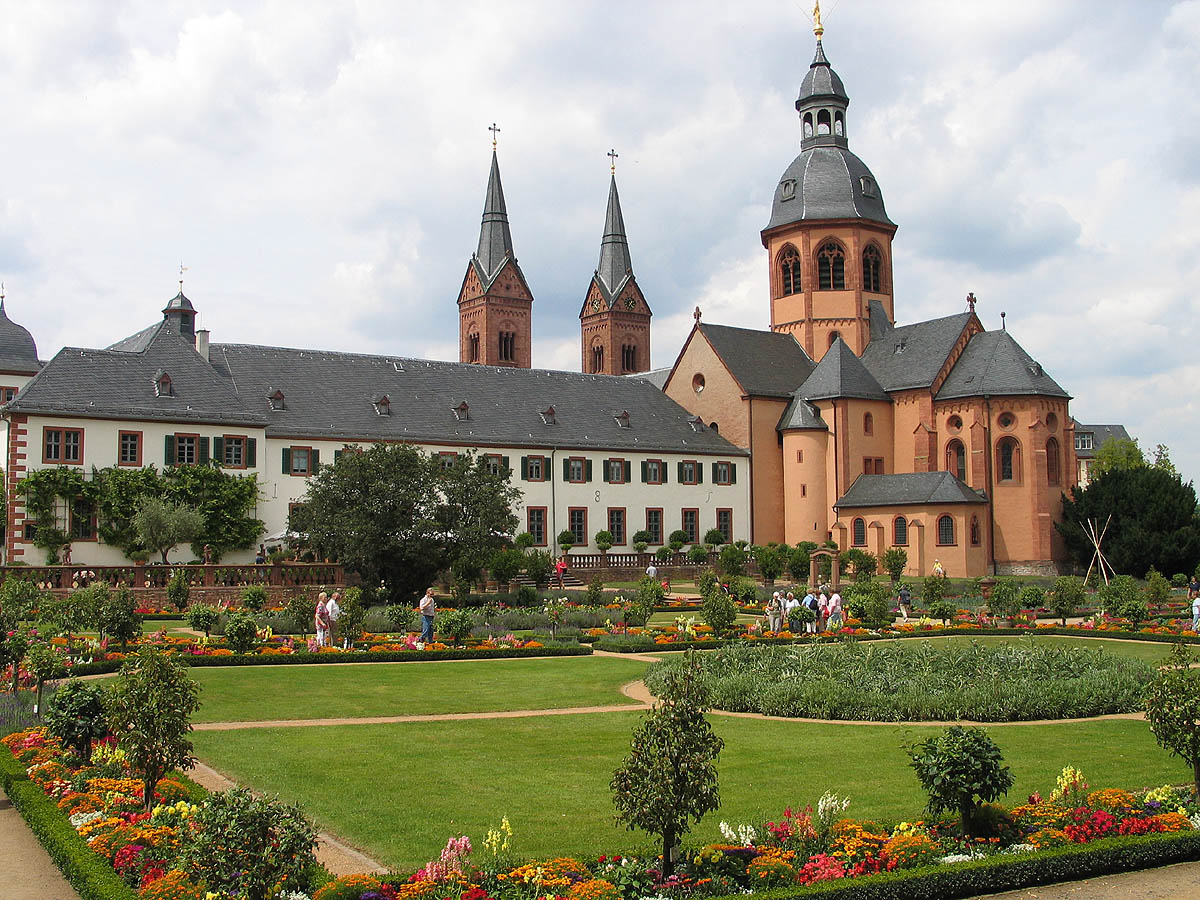
Einhard-Basilika with abbey building and garden

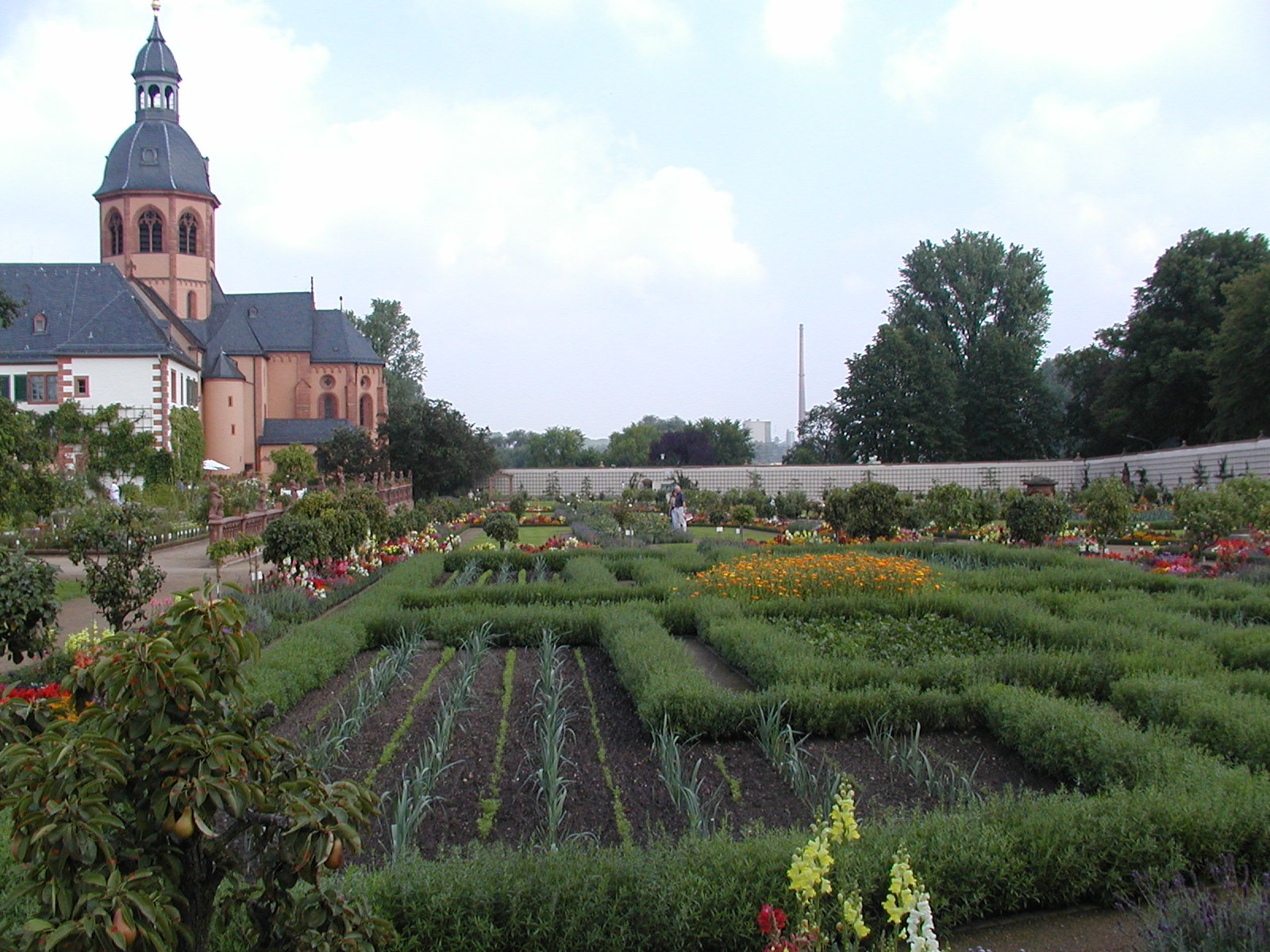
Abbey garden

Seligenstadt's most prominent landmark and historic building is the Basilika St. Marcellinus und Petrus (also known colloquially as Einhard-Basilika) with Saints Marcellinus's and Peter's relics. Today's structure is mostly Baroque, dating to a reconstruction on occasion of its 900th anniversary, but the nave of the original three-aisled church built by Einhard is still extant. The massive crossing tower is Baroque, but the two Romanesque Revival towers flanking the western main entry only date to 1868. The interior is also dominated by Baroque features, such as the main altar, several altars in the transepts, the pulpit and the wrought-iron choir screen which replaced the medieval rood screen. The silver shrine containing the relics is today exhibited behind the choir screen. Above hangs a Romanesque crucifix.

Since 1925 the church has borne the honorary title of minor basilica, bestowed by Pope Pius XI. Although the building was heavily modified over the centuries, this is nonetheless one of the largest basilicas with a basic Carolingean structure north of the Alps.

=== Kloster Seligenstadt ===
Nothing remains of the original Benedictine abbey built in the 9th century. The oldest extant buildings of Kloster Seligenstadt date from the 11th century. The most prominent are from the Baroque period, including the library and the Prälatur with its Kaisersaal (emperor's hall). The abbey was dissolved in 1803.

It has been fully restored, including the Baroque garden which combined a herb and vegetable garden with a formal park. A museum was opened in the abbey, showing exhibits on the history of the town and the abbey.

=== Kaiserpfalz ===
Dating to the reign of the Staufer emperors Friedrich Barbarossa or Friedrich II (12th-13th century), of the Palatium (Kaiserpfalz) on the Main's banks, also known as the Rotes Schloss ("Red Palace"), only the Main façade is still standing with double and triple arcades with arches of red sandstone. With a ground area of 47 m × 14 m, this rectangular Kaiserpfalz was among the smaller ones. Perhaps the Emperor used it as a weekend residence or a small hunting lodge. The first restoration work took place in 1938; restoration work on the south and west walls has been ongoing since 1996.

=== Other secular buildings ===
From around the same time comes the so-called Romanisches Haus built in massive stone with great arcades on the ground floor. On the first floor are double arcades with middle column and arch and a blind arcade under the crow-stepped gable. In 1187, the building was the Vogtei and in 1188 the showplace for Barbarossa's court, which he held there that year. It was restored in 1984, and in the 21st century, cultural events take place here.

The town fortification, built in the 12th century and strengthened in the 15th, originally had four gatetowers and six bulwark towers. Of the town gates, only the Steinheimer Tor from 1603-1605 is preserved; of the bulwark towers, three are still standing. The Kaiserpfalz’s Main façade was integrated into the town wall, to which also wall and ditch complexes belonged. The greater part of the town fortification was torn down in the 19th century.

The town hall at the marketplace was renovated in 1823 and stands out architecturally as the only Neoclassical building with great arcades in amongst many timber-frame houses. Two arms stones with dragon’s heads were integrated into the building from the predecessor building, itself documented in 1539. The square tower goes back to the old parish church, which was torn down once the town parish took over the Einhard-Basilika in 1812 after the dissolution of the Benedictine abbey.

=== Timber frame architecture ===
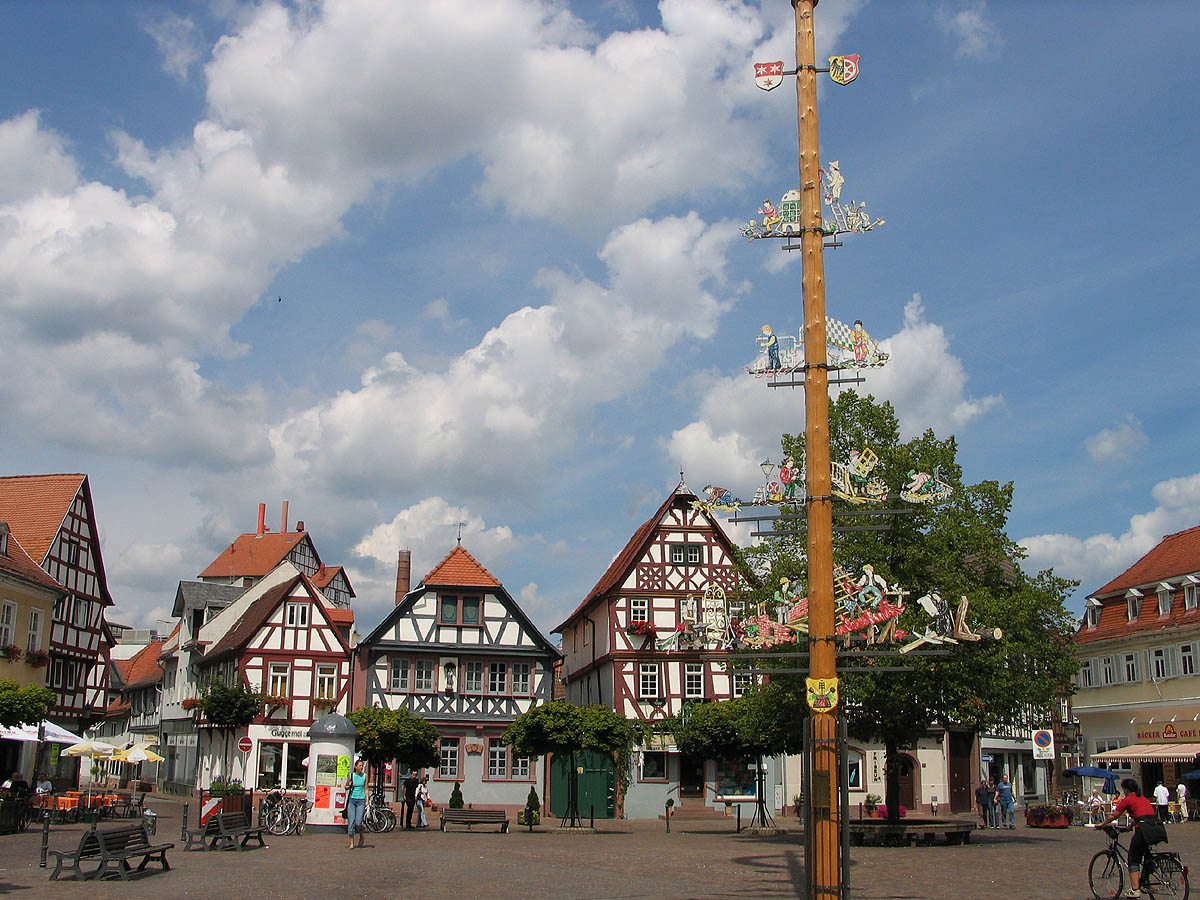
Marketplace

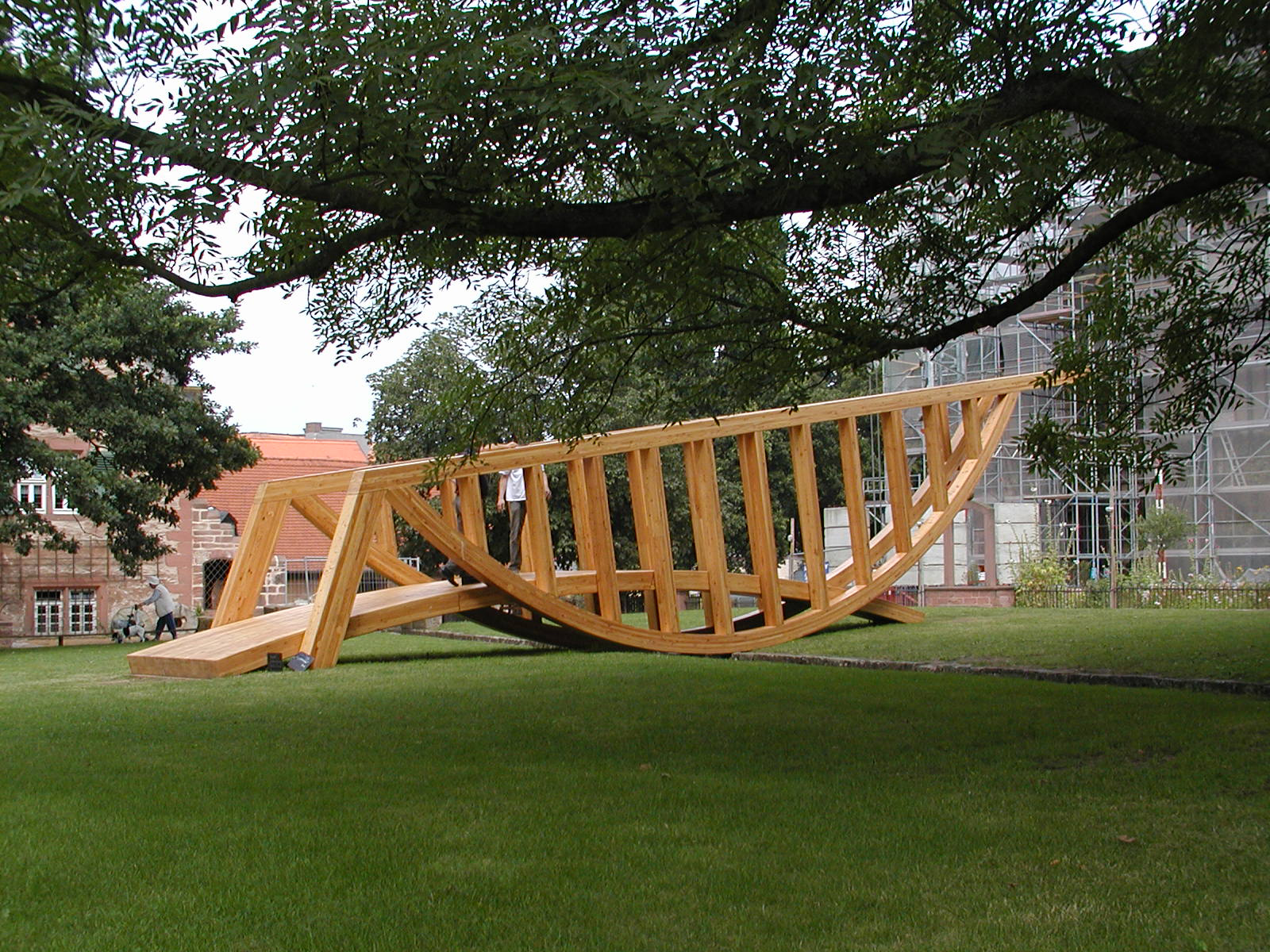
Bridge in the monastery garden (it was part of a temporary exhibition and stands now on the Main between Seligenstadt and Klein Welzheim)

Seligenstadt has a great number of historic buildings and timber-frame houses from the 17th and 18th centuries, some of which are listed buildings. This is why the town is also on one of the nine routes of the Deutsche Fachwerkstraße (German Timber Frame Road) (Rhine-Main-Odenwald route).

Most of these two- and three-floor timber-frame houses are to be found at the marketplace and in rows along the nearby streets (particularly Steinheimer Straße, Kleine Fischergasse, Große Fischergasse, Kleine Maingasse, Große Maingasse and Freihofstraße). Examples at the marketplace are the Alte Schmiede (“Old Smithy”, no. 13, now a restaurant), nos. 7 and 10, the historic apothecary with the apothecary's emblem with a mortar, the so-called Einhard-Haus from 1596 with a richly decorated oriel, the house on Steinheimer Straße at the corner of Stadtmühlengasse (1697), Freihofplatz 3 (1567), the little house at Freihofstraße 4 and many others.

The timber-frame neighbourhood along Rosengasse is called Klaa-Frankreich (Frankreich means “France” in German), for which there is a particular historical reason: After the Thirty Years' War, Abbot Leonhard Colchon settled people from a Wallonian homeland here after the local population had been decimated by warfare, famine and the Plague. Names like Beike, Massoth, Bonifer, Dutine, Oger and Assian still bear witness to the earlier francophone settlers.

=== Buildings outside the town centre ===
- In the constituent community of Klein-Welzheim near the historic abbey fishponds stands a moated palace in the style of a mediaeval castle, albeit with Baroque additions, which the abbot at Seligenstadt had built in 1707 as a summer seat.
- In the constituent community of Froschhausen, the former community's town hall has a special meaning. Before it was built in 1939, the former community church standing at the spot was torn down. The church tower, however, was integrated into the new town hall building. Froschhausen's old community core also offers a few other timber-frame buildings.

== Culture ==
=== Name ===
According to a legend, the town's name has nothing to do with the transfer of the martyrs’ bones as related above, but rather with the above-mentioned Einhard, one of Charlemagne's advisers, with whose daughter, Emma (or Imma), Einhard ran away. He lived with her in Obermulinheim. The Emperor was passing through the town one night and entered the inn, in which his daughter was working. She served him pancakes, and the Emperor recognized their incomparable flavour. Charlemagne, realizing that he had found his runaway daughter then supposedly said “Selig sei die Stadt genannt, da ich meine Tochter Emma wiederfand” (“Blessed be called the town, as I found my daughter Emma again.”), which, it is said, yielded the town's name, from the word selig (“blessed”) and the word Stadt (“town”). This “quote” is still to be seen on the oriel at the so-called Einhardhaus (renovated in 1596) in Seligenstadt.

=== Seligenstädter Geleit ===
The Seligenstädter Geleit (“Seligenstadt Escort”) is a custom that is unique in Germany from the Early Middle Ages, which has been preserved in altered form down to the present day. In the Middle Ages, bands of merchants with their wagons came from all points on the compass to the Frankfurt Trade Fair. Merchants from Augsburg and Nuremberg had to come through the Spessart or along the Main to their rest stop at Seligenstadt. The way was dangerous, as the rich merchants were very much a worthwhile target for highwaymen and robber knights. Therefore, the Staufer Emperor Friedrich II put the merchants under Imperial protection with a Geleitsbrief, a kind of safe-conduct, in 1240. Every affected fiefholder thereafter was obliged to afford those passing through their lands armed escort for a fee. Near Seligenstadt the escort troops were changed. Electoral Mainz escort troops handed their charges to Frankfurt troops. From this time comes the Hänselbrauch, a custom among salesmen that actually became a rule. Newly minted salesmen then had to drink a whole litre of wine from the Geleitslöffel (“escort spoon”) without stopping to rest to earn entrance into the salesmen's association. Anyone who could not pass the so-called Nagelprobe (“nail test”) had to “treat” the merchants’ guild, and this specifically meant paying for the catering. This custom is, in moderated form, still today in Seligenstadt the highlight of the Geleitsfest (“Escort Festival”), which is held every four years.

=== Carnival (Fastnacht) ===
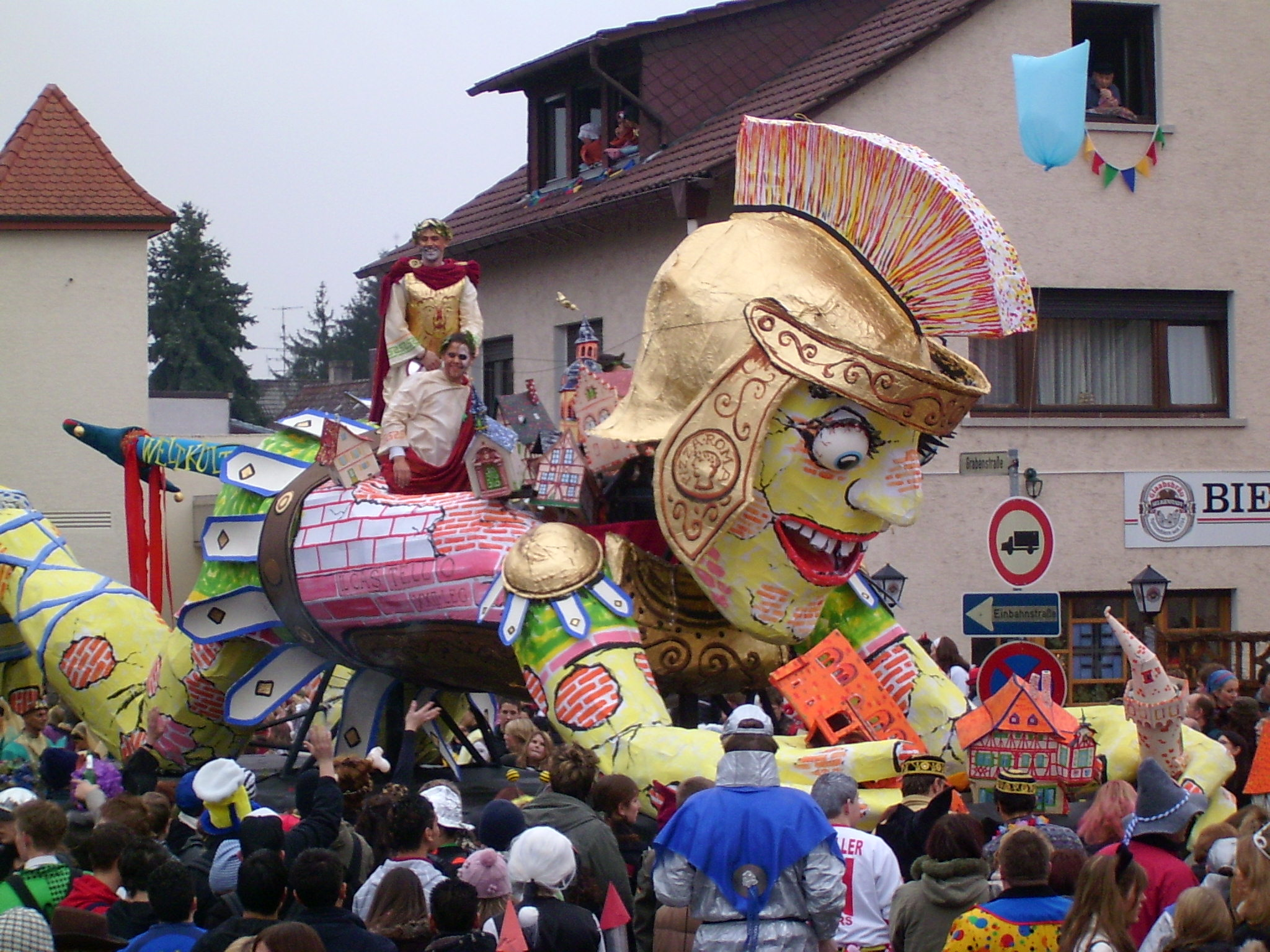
Float in the Rosenmontag parade 2006

The town of Seligenstadt is widely known for its Carnival parade, which snakes its way, traditionally on Rosenmontag (Shrove Monday), through the historic inner town and the neighbouring parts of town. There is proof that this Rosenmontag parade has existed since 1859. Nowadays the parade has more than a hundred elaborately built attractions, drawing an average of forty thousand interested visitors from near and far. At Carnival time, the Seligenstadt fools (Narren) call themselves “Schlumber” and their town “Schlumberland”. Each year, a Carnival Prince and Princess are chosen, as are two children to be the Child Prince and Princess. Besides the Rosenmontag parade, there is a Kinderfaschingsumzug (“Children’s Carnival Parade”) each year on the Sunday.

== Infrastructure ==
=== Transport ===
Seligenstadt has its own Autobahn interchange on the A 3.

Seligenstadt railway station lies on the Hanau-Groß-Umstadt Wiebelsbach (- Erbach) railway line (Odenwaldbahn).

==== Main ferry ====
Technical data
Overall length	28 m
Overall breadth	8.40 m
Vehicle deck breadth	5.25 m
Draught (unladen)	0.62 m
Draught (laden)	1 m
Tonnage	45 t
Drive	2 Iveco engines
Propellers	2 Schottel propellers SRP 30
Onboard voltage	24 V
Speed	5 knots (9.26 km/h)
Keel laying	February 1971
Beginning of service	May 1971
Hours in service thus far	over 75,000 hours

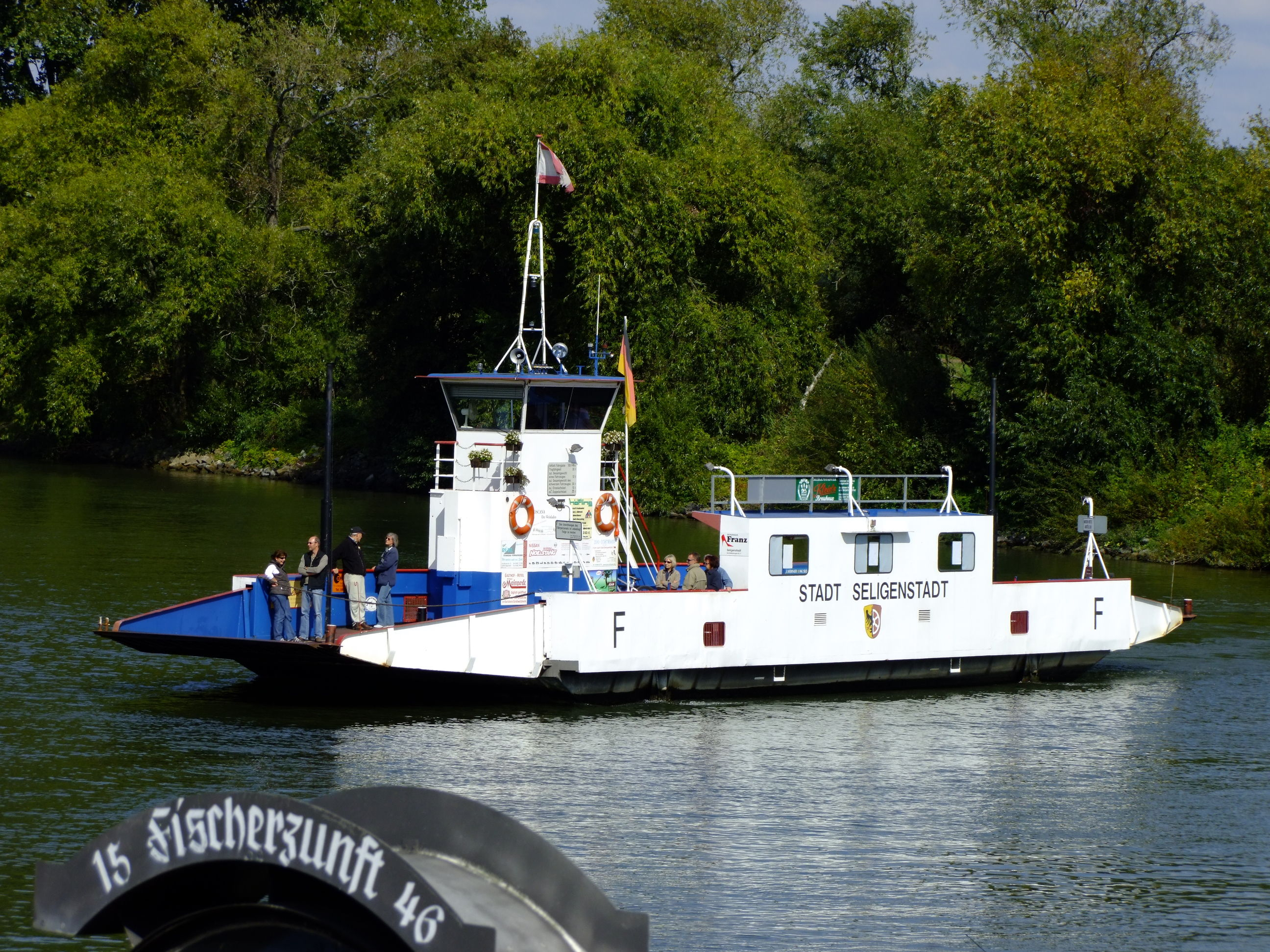
The ferry on tour

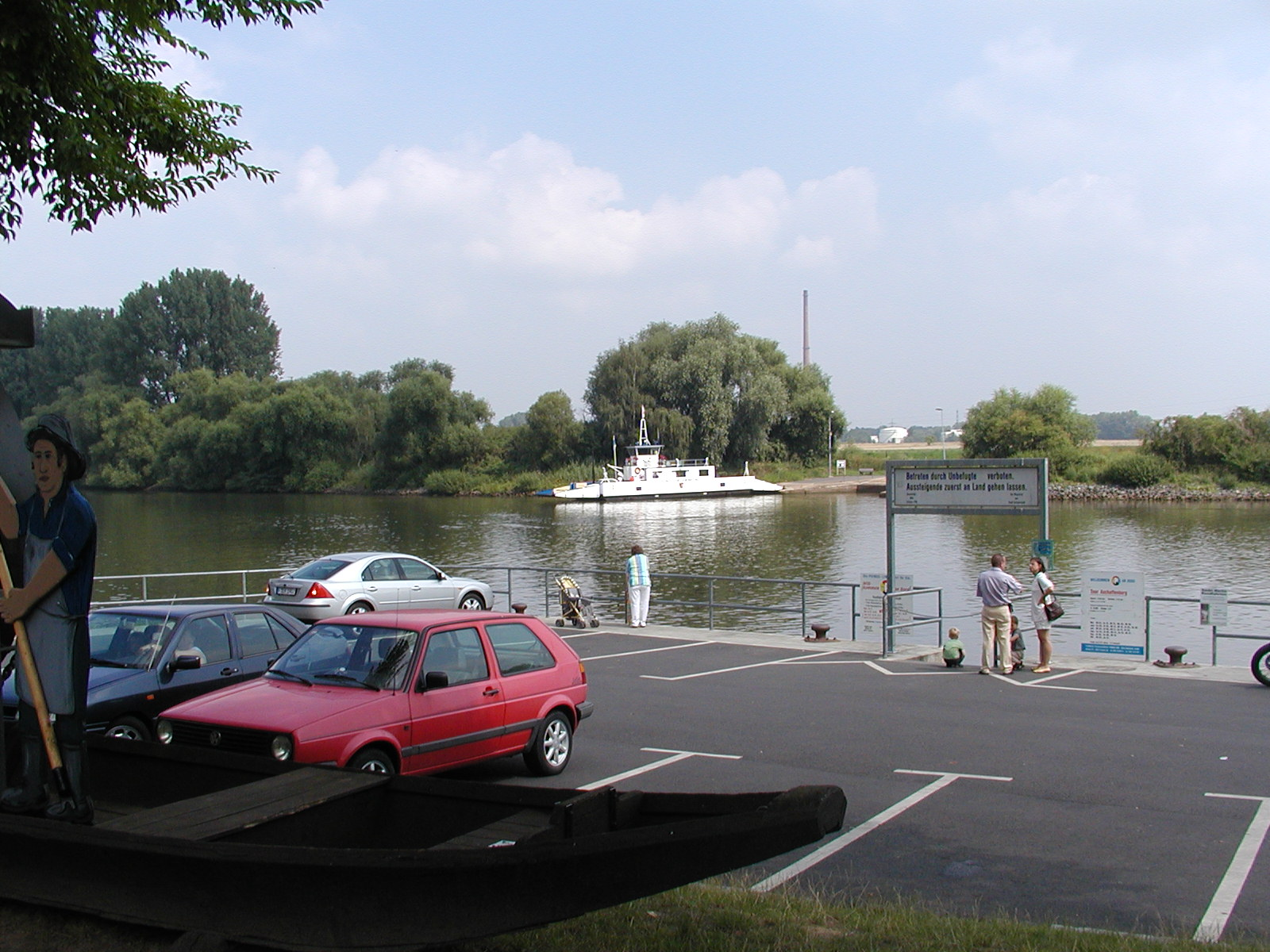
The Main ferry at the Bavarian dock

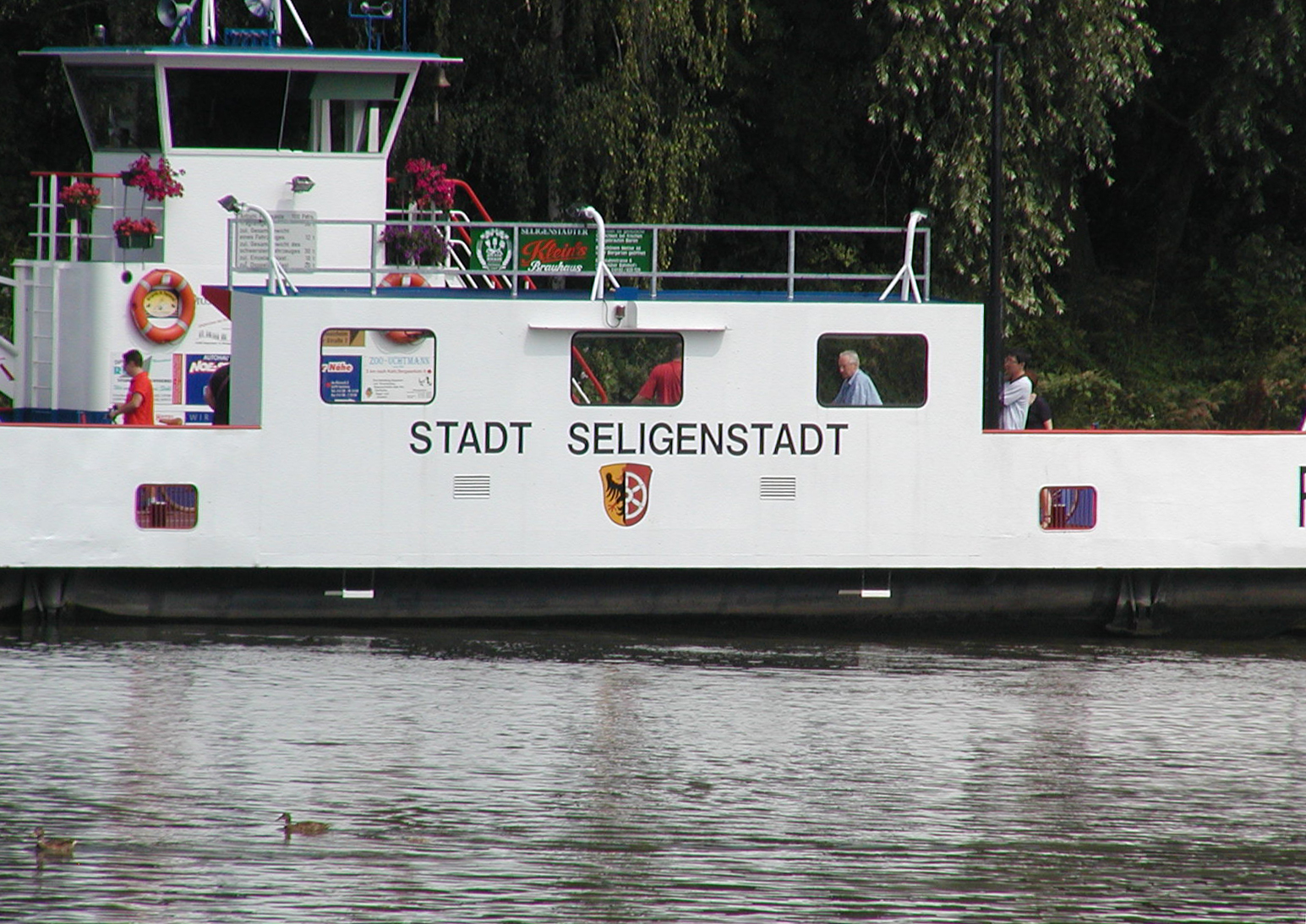
Closeup

Today's Mainfähre (“Main ferry”, formerly known as “Newe”) is an untethered car ferry and crosses the Main at Main kilometre 69.60. It has been running since 1971. Before this there had been two or three (the exact number cannot be confirmed) ferries linking the Hessian town of Seligenstadt with the Bavarian side of the Main – the communities of Kahl and Dettingen. It is run by the Seligenstadt Town Works and incurs great losses every year due to, among other things, the high administrative costs. It has therefore been discussed many times whether it might be a better idea to build a bridge across the Main (as was done at Mainflingen) or indeed to replace the car ferry with a pedestrian and cyclist ferry. There has also been talk of privatizing the ferry to reduce costs. It is one of twelve ferries still crossing the Main today.

As early as the 9th century there was a link in place across the Main, as the monastery at Seligenstadt held the rights to ferry persons and goods to the Main's far side. For money or kind, these rights were passed on, out of which arose something called Fährgerechtigkeit (“ferry justice”). This Fährgerechtigkeit remained mostly for many years in one family's ownership and could be further bequeathed. When the monastery was dissolved in 1803, the Fährgerechtigkeit passed to the Grand Duchy of Hesse. In 1868, the town of Seligenstadt took over all rights and privileges for the Main crossing from the ferrymen of the time. The town then leased the ferrying rights to the highest bidder. Only after the Second World War did the town take the ferry over again.

=== Courts ===
Seligenstadt has at its disposal an Amtsgericht, which belongs to the Landesgericht region of Darmstadt and the Oberlandesgericht region of Frankfurt am Main.

== Media ==
- Offenbach-Post – the publishing house has its headquarters in Offenbach am Main and reports regularly in the regional section about Seligenstadt. It has an editorial office in Seligenstadt.
- Seligenstädter Heimatblatt – has appeared weekly since 1949.
- Kurier am Marktplatz – reports about Seligenstadt and the neighbouring communities of Mainhausen and Hainburg.

== Education ==
- Alfred-Delp-Schule in Froschhausen
- Einhardschule Seligenstadt
- Gerhart-Hauptmann-Schule in Klein-Welzheim
- Konrad-Adenauer-Schule
- Matthias-Grünewald-Schule
- Merianschule Seligenstadt
- Walinusschule in Klein-Welzheim

== Notable people ==
=== Honorary citizens ===
- Franz Boeres, b. 4 September 1872, d. 24 May 1956, sculptor and painter
- Fritz Bruder, b. 30 May 1907, d. 1975; politician

=== Sons and daughters of the town ===
- Hans Memling, b. ca. 1433, d. 11 August 1494 in Brügge, German painter of the Flemish school.
- Heinrich Galm, b. 23 October 1895 in Seligenstadt, d. 30 October 1984, socialist politician.
- Franz Singer, b. 8 September 1898 in Seligenstadt, d. 22 July 1953 in Saarbrücken, journalist and politician in the Saarland.
- Frank Lortz, b. 5 June 1953 in Seligenstadt, member and former vice-president of the Hessian Landtag.

=== Others with links to Seligenstadt ===
- Elisabeth Langgässer, poet and writer, taught intermittently from 1920 to 1928 at the boys’ elementary school in Seligenstadt. Into this time also fell the beginning of her relationship with the constitutional lawyer Hermann Heller.
