= Creußen =

- Town
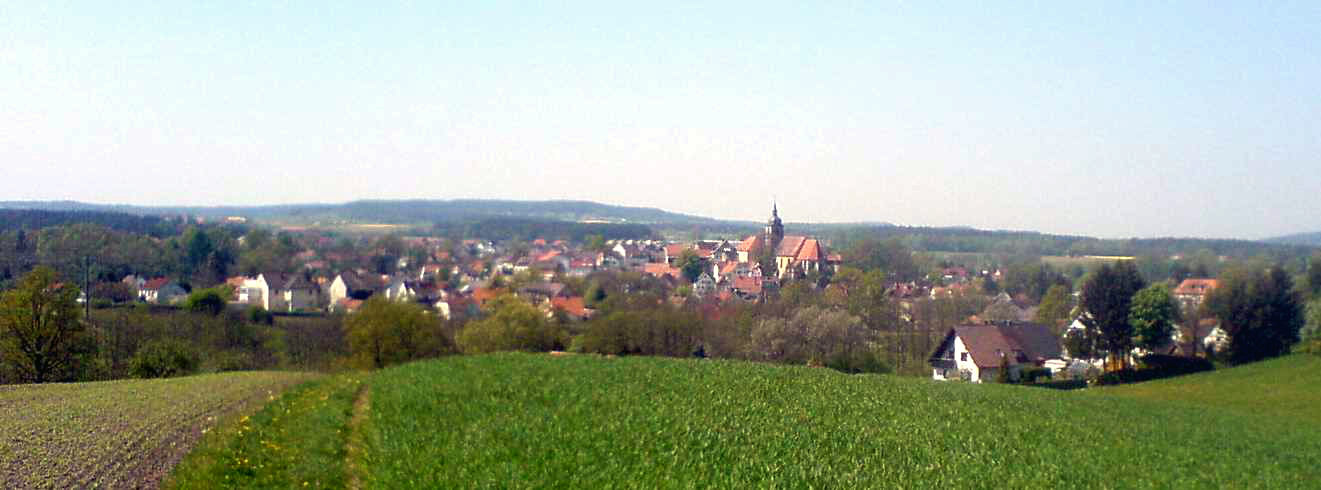
- Panorama view of Creußen

- Coat of arms

- Location of Creußen within Bayreuth district
- Interactive map of Creußen
- Location within Germany Location within Bavaria
- Coordinates: 49°50′38.35″N 11°37′21.63″E
- Country: Germany
- State: Bavaria
- Admin. region: Oberfranken
- District: Bayreuth
- Municipal assoc.: Creußen

Government
  - Mayor (2020–26): Martin Dannhäußer

Area
  - Total: 64.89 km^{2} (25.05 sq mi)
- Elevation: 426–640 m (1,398–2,100 ft)

Population (2025-12-31)
  - Total: 4,925
  - Density: 75.90/km^{2} (196.6/sq mi)
- Time zone: UTC+01:00 (CET)
  - Summer (DST): UTC+02:00 (CEST)
- Postal codes: 95473
- Dialling codes: 09270
- Vehicle registration: BT
- Website: www.stadt-creussen.de

Creußen (German pronunciation: [ˈkʁɔʏsn̩]) is a small town in the district of Bayreuth in Bavaria, Germany. It is situated on the Red Main river, 13 km southeast of Bayreuth.

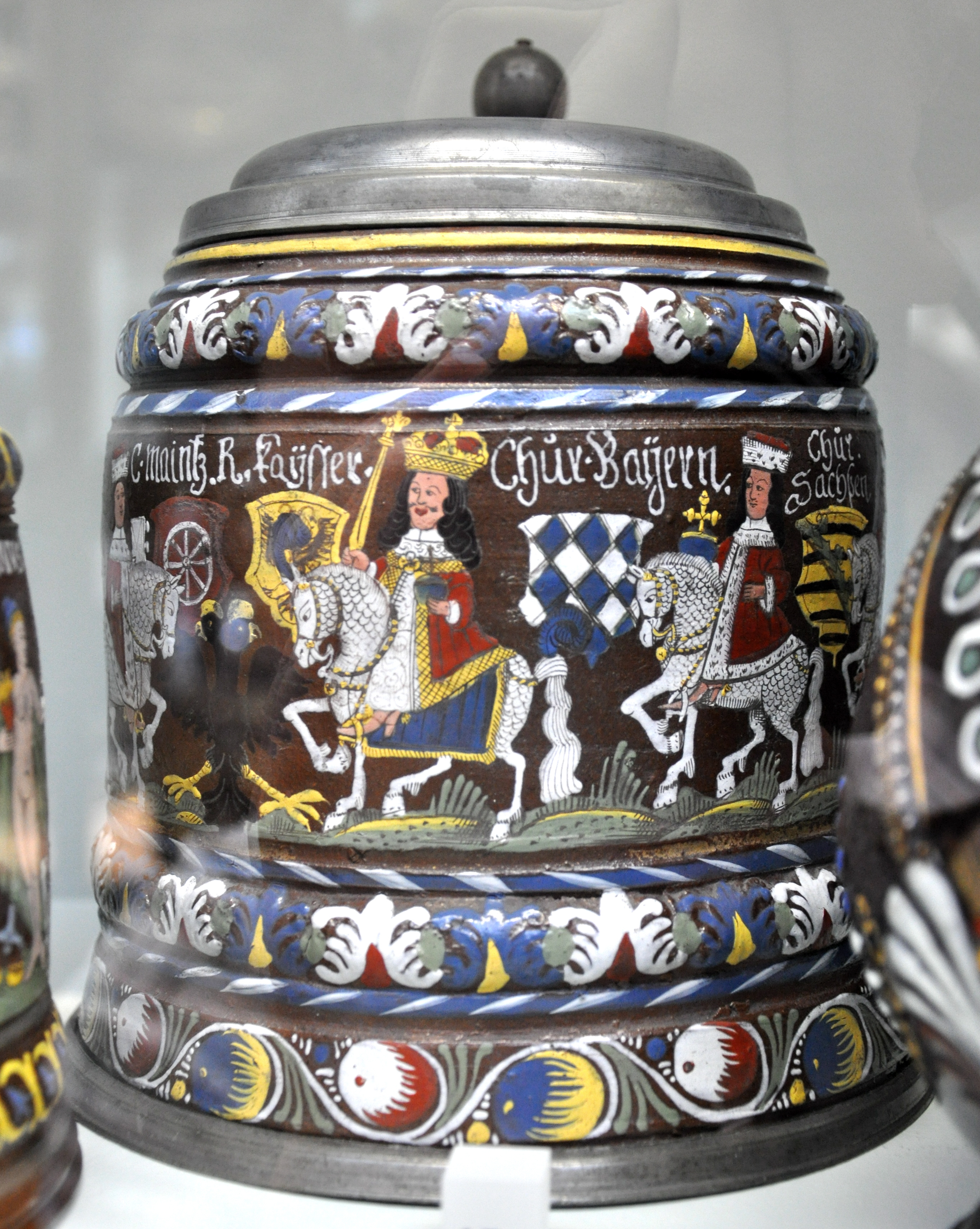
Creußen painted stoneware beer stein of 1696 from the Victoria and Albert Museum

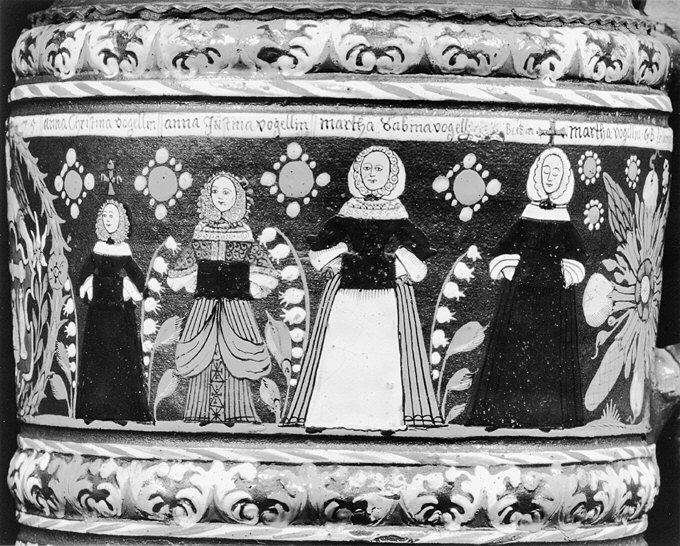
Creußen painted stoneware beer stein of 1675 from the Metropolitan Museum of Art

The municipality of Creußen comprises Creußen itself, the former market town of Lindenhardt, the villages of Althaidhof, Bühl, Gottsfeld, Großweiglareuth, Neuhaidhof, Neuhof, Schwürz, Seidwitz, Tiefenthal and Unterschwarzach, and a number of hamlets, including Boden, Hörlasreuth, Kotzmannsreuth, Letten, Neuenreuth, Ottmannsreuth and Wasserkraut.

Creußen is famous for its stoneware beer steins.

Creußen is the starting point of the Red Main branch of the Main-Radweg bicycle path which stretches about 600 km along the Main until the mouth into the Rhine.

== Notable people ==
- Christoph Wirth (1870–1950), German physicist and inventor
