= List of Franconian wine towns =

This list includes every town in the German wine-growing region of Franconia where wine is grown with at least one Qualitätslage (appellation).

The Franconian wine region is east of Frankfurt, along the river Main and its tributaries, where it has been cultivated for over 1200 years. As of 2025, there are 23 collective vineyard sites and 216 single vineyards.

== Bereich Mainviereck ==
=== Großlage Reuschberg ===
- Hörstein (Alzenau): Abtsberg

=== Großlage Heiligenthal ===
- Großostheim: Reischklingenberg, Harstell

=== Großlagenfrei ===
- Aschaffenburg: Pompejaner, Godelsberg, Badberg
- Bürgstadt: Mainhölle, Centgrafenberg
- Dorfprozelten: Predigtstuhl
- Eichenbühl: Hoher Berg
- Engelberg (Großheubach): Klostergarten
- Erlenbach am Main: Hochberg
- Großheubach: Bischofsberg
- Großwallstadt: Lützeltaler Berg
- Klingenberg am Main: Einsiedel, Schlossberg
- Kreuzwertheim: Kaffelstein
- Michelbach (Alzenau): Goldberg, Steinberg, Aloisengarten, Apostelgarten
- Miltenberg: Steingrübler
- Obernau: Sanderberg
- Rottenberg: Gräfenstein
- Rück (Elsenfeld): Johannisberg, Jesuitenberg, Schalk
- Wasserlos (Alzenau): Schloßberg, Luhmännchen

== Bereich Maindreieck ==
=== Großlagenfrei ===
- Adelsberg: Wernleite
- Bergtheim: Harfenspiel
- Böttigheim: Wurmberg
- Erlenbach bei Marktheidenfeld: Krähenschnabel
- Frankenwinheim: Rosenberg
- Gaibach: Schloßpark
- Gemünden: Scherenberg
- Greßenheim: Geisberg
- Hallburg: Schloßberg
- Homburg: Kallmuth, Edelfrau
- Kitzingen: Eheriedener Berg
- Kleinochsenfurt: Herrenberg
- Lengfurt: Alter Berg, Oberrot
- Marktheidenfeld: Kreuzberg
- Mainberg: Schloßberg
- Remlingen: Krähenschnabel, Sonnenhain
- Rimpar: Kobersberg
- Rottendorf: Kehlberg
- Röttingen: Feuerstein
- Schweinfurt: Peterstirn, Mainleite
- Tauberzell: Hasennestle
- Tauberrettersheim: Königin
- Uettingen: Kirchberg
- Veitshöchheim: Sonnenschein
- Vogelsburg: Pforte
- Wiesenfeld: Herbstthal

=== Großlage Marienberg (Würzburg) ===
- Würzburg: Pfaffenberg, Stein, Stein/Harfe, Schloßberg, Innere Leiste, Abtsleite, Kirchberg

=== Großlage Burg (Hammelburg) ===
- Engenthal: Schloßberg
- Feuerthal: Altenberg, Kreuz
- Fuchsstadt: Rubenhöll
- Hammelburg: Heroldsberg, Trautlestal
- Machtilshausen: Sommerleite
- Ramsthal: St. Klausen
- Saaleck: Schloßberg
- Sulzthal: Schlangenberg
- Trimberg: Schloßberg
- Westheim: Altenberg, Längberg
- Wirmsthal: Scheinberg

=== Großlage Roßtal (Karlstadt) ===
- Arnstein: Bischofsberg
- Eußenheim: First
- Gambach: Kalbenstein
- Gössenheim: Arnberg
- Himmelstadt: Kelter
- Karlstadt: Im Stein
- Laudenbach (Karlstadt): Schloß
- Mühlbach: Fronberg
- Retzstadt: Langenberg
- Stetten: Stein

=== Großlage Ravensburg (Thüngersheim) ===
- Erlabrunn: Weinsteig
- Güntersleben: Sommerstuhl
- Leinach: Himmelberg
- Margetshöchheim: Bärental
- Retzbach: Benediktusberg
- Rimpar: Koberberg
- Thüngersheim: Johannisberg, Scharlachberg
- Veitshöchheim: Wölflein, Sonnenschein
- Zellingen: Sonnenleite

=== Großlage Ewig Leben (Randersacker) ===
- Randersacker: Teufelskeller, Pfülben, Lämmerberg, Marsberg, Sonnenstuhl, Dabug
- Theilheim: Altenberg

=== Großlage Ölspiel ===
- Sommerhausen: Steinbach, Reifenstein
- Eibelstadt: Steinbach
- Winterhausen: Kaiser Wilhelm

=== Großlage Markgraf Babenberg ===
- Frickenhausen: Fischer, Markgraf, Kapellenberg, Babenberg

=== Großlage Teufelstor ===
- Eibelstadt: Kapelleberg, Mönchsleite
- Randersacker: Dabug

=== Großlage Hofrat (Kitzingen) ===
- Albertshofen: Herrgottsweg
- Buchbrunn: Heißer Stein
- Kitzingen: Wilhelmsberg, Eselsberg, Kaiser Karl
- Mainstockheim: Hofstück
- Marktbreit: Sonnenberg
- Marktsteft: Sonnenberg
- Obernbreit: Kanzel
- Repperndorf: Kaiser Karl
- Segnitz: Zobelsberg, Pfaffensteig
- Sulzfeld: Maustal, Cyriakusberg

=== Großlage Honigberg ===
- Dettelbach: Berg Rondell, Sonnenleite
- Mainstockheim: Hofstück

=== Großlage Kirchberg (Volkach) ===
- Astheim (Volkach): Karthäuser
- Escherndorf (Volkach): Fürstenberg, Lump, Berg
- Frankenwinheim: Rosenberg
- Gaibach (Volkach): Kapellenberg
- Köhler (Volkach): Fürstenberg
- Hallburg (Volkach): Rosenberg, Kreuzberg
- Hergolshausen (Waigolshausen): Mainleite
- Krautheim (Volkach): Sonnenleite
- Lindach (Kolitzheim): Kreuzpfad
- Neuses am Berg (Dettelbach): Glatzen
- Neusetz (Dettelbach): Fürstenberg
- Nordheim: Vögelein, Kreuzberg
- Obereisenheim (Eisenheim): Höll
- Obervolkach (Volkach): Landsknecht
- Rimbach (Volkach): Landsknecht
- Schwanfeld: Mühlberg
- Sommerach: Katzenkopf, Rosenberg
- Stammheim (Kolitzheim): Eselsberg
- Theilheim: Mainleite
- Untereisenheim (Eisenheim): Sonnenberg, Berg
- Volkach: Ratsherr
- Wipfeld: Zehntgraf
- Zeilitzheim (Kolitzheim): Heiligenberg

== Bereich Steigerwald ==
=== Großlagenfrei ===
- Bamberg: Alter Graben
- Eltmann: Schloßleite
- Iphofen: Domherr
- Gerolzhofen: Arlesgarten
- Krum: Himmelreich
- Martinsheim: Langenstein
- Prappach: Henneberg
- Prichsenstadt: Krone
- Sand: Himmelsbühl
- Staffelbach: Spitzelberg
- Tiefenstockheim: Stiefel
- Unfinden: Kinnleitenberg
- Unterhaid: Röthla
- Weiher: Weinberge
- Zeil: Mönchshang
- Zell: Schlossberg
- Zell am Ebersberg: Zeller Schloßberg

=== Großlage Steige ===
- Handthal (Ortsteil von Oberschwarzach): Stollberg
- Kammerforst (Ortsteil von Oberschwarzach): Teufel
- Oberschwarzach: Herrenberg
- Wiebelsberg (Ortsteil von Oberschwarzach): Dachs

=== Großlage Zabelstein ===
- Gerolzhofen: Köhler
- Sulzheim: Köhler, Mönchberg
- Dingolshausen: Köhler
- Altmannsdorf: Sonnenwinkel
- Michelau: Vollburg

=== Großlage Burgweg (Iphofen) ===
- Iphofen: Julius-Echter-Berg, Kalb, Kronsberg
- Markt Einersheim: Vogelsang, Stüblein
- Possenheim: Vogelsang

=== Großlage Herrenberg ===
- Castell: Bausch, Kirchberg, Trautberg, Hohnart, Feuerbach, Reitsteig, Kugelspiel, Schloßberg
- Neuendorf: Hüßberg, Mönchsbuck, Sonneberg, Wonne

=== Großlage Kapellenberg ===
- Oberschwappach: Sommertal
- Sand: Kronberg
- Schmachtenberg (Zeil am Main): Eulengrund
- Steinbach Nonnenberg
- Zeil: Pfarrerspflöckn
- Ziegelanger: Ölschnabel

=== Großlage Schild (Abtswind) ===
- Abtswind: Altenberg
- Greuth: Bastel
- Kirchschönbach: Mariengarten

=== Großlage Schloßberg (Rödelsee) ===
- Großlangheim: Kiliansberg, Schwanleite
- Kleinlangheim: Wutschenberg
- Rödelsee: Schwanleite, Küchenmeister
- Sickershausen: Storchenbrünnle
- Wiesenbronn: Wachhügel

=== Großlage Schloßstück (Frankenberg) ===
- Bullenheim: Paradies
- Ergersheim: Altenberg
- Hüttenheim: Tannenberg
- Ippesheim: Herrschaftsberg
- Ingolstadt (Sugenheim): Rotenberg
- Krassolzheim (Sugenheim): Pfannberg
- Markt Nordheim: Hohenkottenheim
- Weigenheim: Hohenlandsberg
- Seinsheim: Hohenbühl
- Ulsenheim: Huttenberg
- Wiebelsheim: Altenberg

=== Großlage Burgberg (Ipsheim) ===
- Dietersheim: Burg Hoheneck
- Dottenheim: Burg Hoheneck
- Ickelheim: Schloßberg
- Ipsheim: Burg Hoheneck
- Kaubenheim: Burg Hoheneck
- Oberntief: Rosenberg
- Weimersheim: Roter Berg

Vergleiche dazu auch die Seite zum Weinbaugebiet Franken
