= Weingut Schmitt's Kinder =

German winery

Weingut Schmitt’s Kinder
- Location: Randersacker am Main, Franconia, Germany
- Appellation: Franconia
- Founded: 1712
- First vintage: 1712
- Key people: Martin Schmitt
- Varietals: Silvaner, Riesling, Müller-Thurgau, Scheurebe, Weißburgunder, Rieslaner, Bacchus, Spätburgunder, Domina
- Distribution: national
- Tasting: open to public
- Website: schmitts-kinder.de

Weingut Schmitt's Kinder

Weingut Schmitt's Kinder (English: Schmitt's Children Winery) is one of the most traditional family wineries in Franconia. Viticulture in the family dates back to 1712, while the name ″Schmitt's Kinder″ dates back to the division of the estate in 1910. Located in Randersacker, Schmitt's Kinder is noted for their Silvaner (37%), Riesling (14%) and pinot noir (10%). Its 35-acre (140,000 m^{2}) estate in the Maindreieck district ("Main triangle") is the middle portion of Franconia and comprising the sites Pfülben, Marsberg, Sonnenstuhl and Teufelskeller. Weingut Schmitt’s Kinder is a member of the Verband Deutscher Prädikatsweingüter (VDP).

== History ==
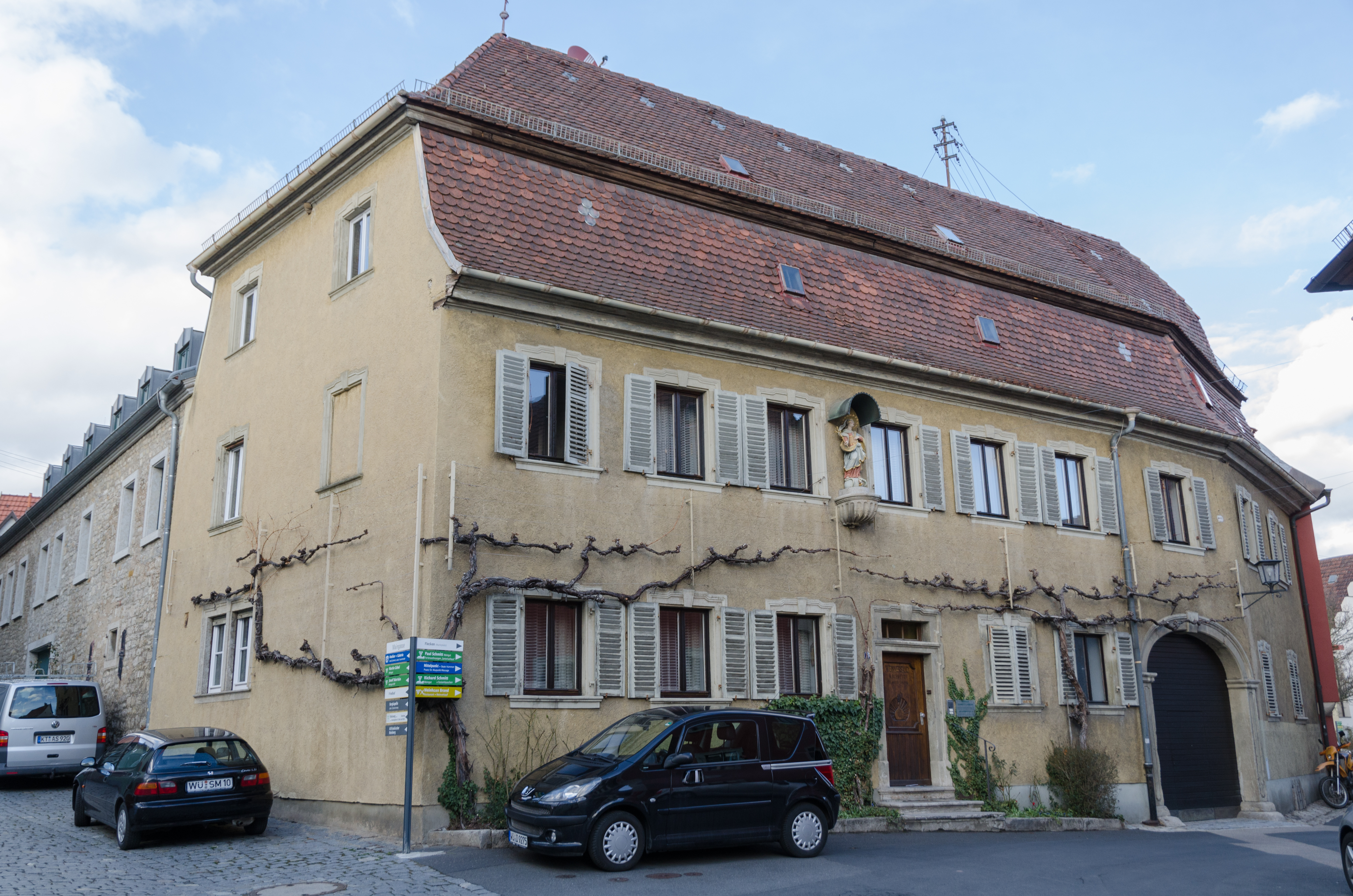
The heritage-protected ancestral home in the Maingasse

Tradition and progress are the two pillars of the winery. This is reflected not only in the wine production, but also in the architecture. The newly constructed winery building at the foot of the Sonnenstuhl site in 1984 was awarded the "Landscape-Oriented Building" prize by the Bavarian Ministry for Food, Agriculture and Forestry for its design and good integration into the wine landscape of the Main valley.

The heritage-protected baroque ancestral home from 1712 is located in the heart of Randersacker and today serves as a bridge between wine and culture. It houses the studio and gallery of a local landscape painter.

== Vineyards and wine ==
Weingut Schmitt’s Kinder owns a total of 14 hectares of vines around Randersacker, including vines in Randersacker Pfülben and Hohenroth. These are selected sites, capable to produce ″Grosses Gewächs″, top-level dry wines. The grapes growing in the Große Gewächslage Randersackerer Sonnenstuhl-Hohenroth are located in a southwest-facing steep slope collecting the sun's energy particularly intensively and – like the Randersackerer Pfülben – is considered one of the best vineyards in Franconia. Tulipa sylvestris can be found during springtime in the site. The loamy shell limestone soil gives the wine a pronounced minerality and density. Due to the low yields and a selective hand harvest, the wines present themselves full-bodied and with great density.

The leading grape variety cultivated is Silvaner 37%, Riesling 14%, Pinot noir 10%, completed by Bacchus, Scheurebe, Sauvignon Blanc, Pinot blanc and the leading red variety of Franconia Domina. The shell-bearing limestone Muschelkalk is the characteristic sedimentary rock of the estate.

== Reception ==
Weingut Schmitt’s Kinder was awarded four stars in Eichelmann Deutschlands Weine 2021 and four stars in the Falstaff Weinguide Deutschland 2021. The VINUM Weinguide Deutschland 2021 lists Schmitt's Kinder with 3.5 stars among the best producers in Franken 2021.

The VINUM magazine lists Randersackerer Silvaner trocken „Große Reserve“ vintage 2018 among Top 10 Deutschland 2021 as second best german wine in his december 2021 edition.
