= Franconia (wine region) =

German wine-producing region

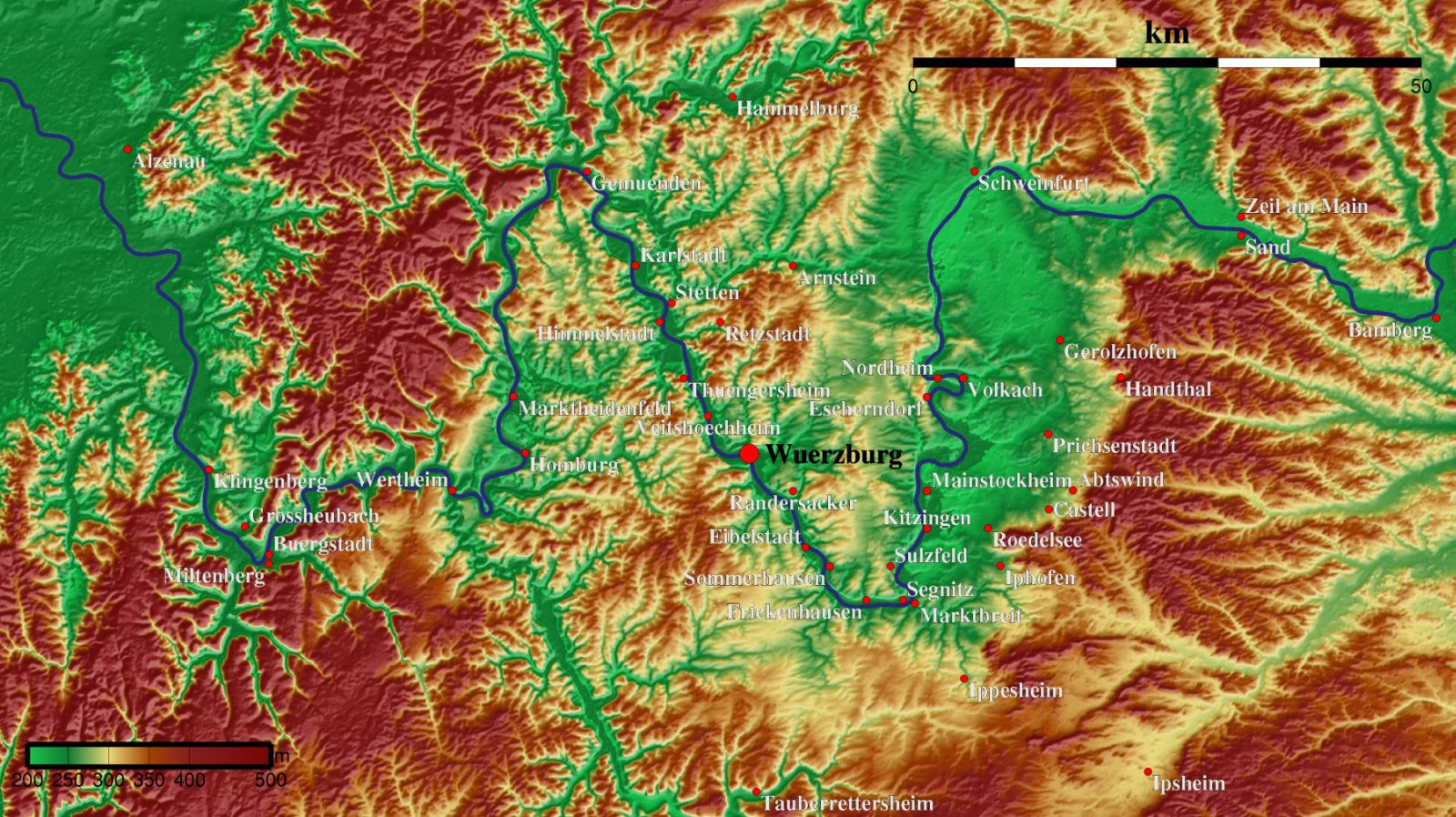
Map of the Franconia region. In the centre of the map, around Würzburg, the river Main makes a sharp turn which defines a V-shaped triangle often referred to as the "Main triangle", Maindreieck. Further to the west, Main makes two almost 90 degree turns, which give rise to an almost square U shape known as the "Main square", Mainviereck. To the southeast of the region lies Steigerwald.

Franconia (German: Franken) is a German wine region, mostly in north west Franconia. It is the only wine region in the federal state of Bavaria. In 2024, vines were grown on 6,128 hectares (15,140 acres) of land in the region.

== Geography ==
The greater part of the wine region is in Lower Franconia around its capital Würzburg along the Main River. There are a few areas in Middle Franconia, mainly in the Steigerwald; and a very small part in the area of Upper Franconia around Bamberg. The bends of the River Main have been used to define the region's three districts, two of which take their names from their respective geometric shape.

=== Mainviereck District ===
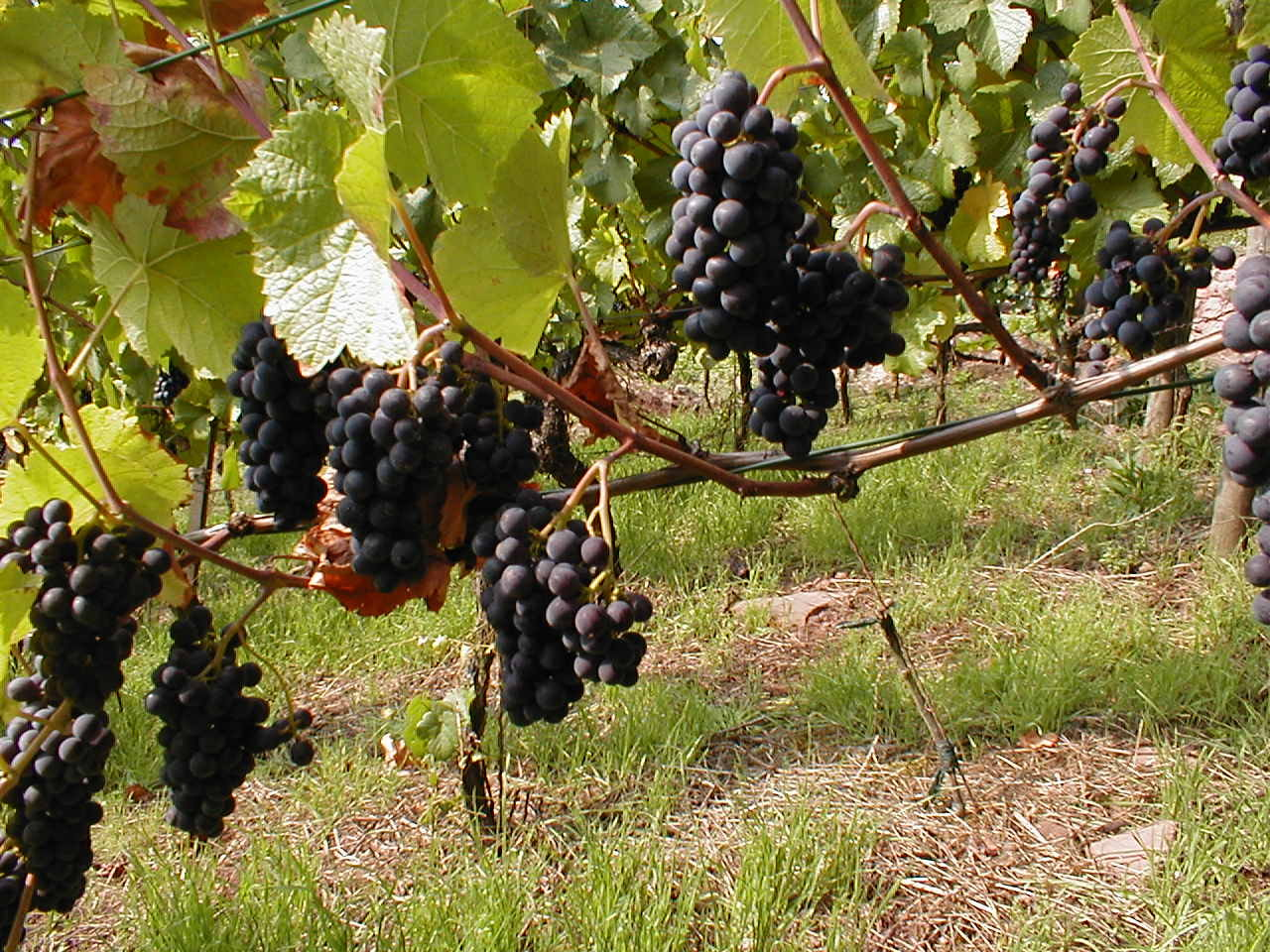
Red grapes along the "Franconian red wine footpath", a long-distance hiking trail

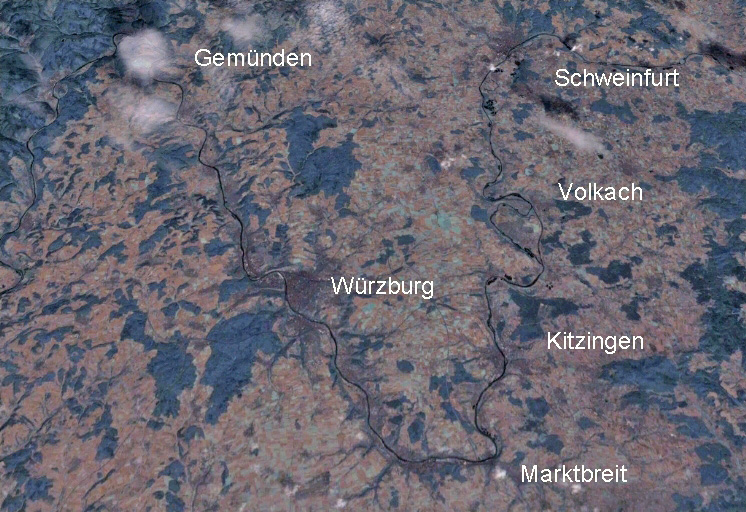
The Maindreieck in bird's-eye view

The Mainviereck ("Main square") is the westernmost district of Franconia, on the lower slopes of the Spessart hills and is one of the warmest spots in Bavaria. The special soil is mainly red sandstone which is especially suitable for growing grape vines for red wine. Franconian vine plantings for red wine started to expand in the 1970s.

The Pinot noirs and the high quality grape Frühburgunder are grown. The "Bürgstadter Centgrafenberg" and the "Schlossberg" in Klingenberg am Main are said to be the best vineyards. Some of the wines made from vines grown there have won national and international wine trophies. The main villages are Bürgstadt, Großheubach and Klingenberg am Main.

The primary red wine areas of Franconia have been connected by the long-distance hiking trail Fränkischer Rotweinwanderweg (Franconian red wine footpath) since 1990.

=== Maindreieck District ===
The Maindreieck ("Main triangle") is the middle portion of Franconia. On the sometimes very steep hills alongside the Main river, the soil mainly consists of Muschelkalk. Mostly Silvaner and Müller-Thurgau grapes are grown. As in many wine regions in Germany, a wide variety of grapes are cultivated. Riesling, Bacchus, Pinot noir, Domina, and Dornfelder are the most important grapes besides Silvaner and Müller-Thurgau. Some wine journalists say that Franconia is the only place in the world where the wines made from Silvaner can be better than those made there from Riesling.

The best-known vineyard site is the Würzburger Stein, a hill north of central Würzburg. The wines from there are known as Steinwein. Along the Maindreieck, nearly every town produces some wine. The earliest evidence of the Silvaner grape is found in the archive of Castell in a document from 10 April 1659.

The most important cities and towns are Würzburg, Randersacker, Thüngersheim, Sommerhausen, Frickenhausen am Main, Sulzfeld am Main, Sommerach, Escherndorf, Nordheim, and Volkach.

=== Steigerwald District ===
The soil of the Mittelgebirge Steigerwald consists mainly of gypsum. The wines of this region often have a very strong mineral taste. The most important villages are Iphofen, Rödelsee and Castell

== History ==
There is evidence that wine has been produced in Franconia for over 1,000 years. In an old document from the year 777 there is a note of a winery in the town of Hammelburg being given by Charlemagne to Fulda Abbey. In medieval times the area under cultivation grew strongly, up to 40,000 ha. In the 20th century it decreased at one stage to just over 2,000 ha.

Today about 6,100 ha of land is used for growing wine. The area stretches from Bamberg to Aschaffenburg. The climate is called continental with Mediterranean influence. Quite often there are strong winters and temperatures under 0 degrees Celsius in the spring. Therefore, wine is grown mainly in especially protected places usually along the hills of the River Main and the Steigerwald.

== Description of Franconian wine ==
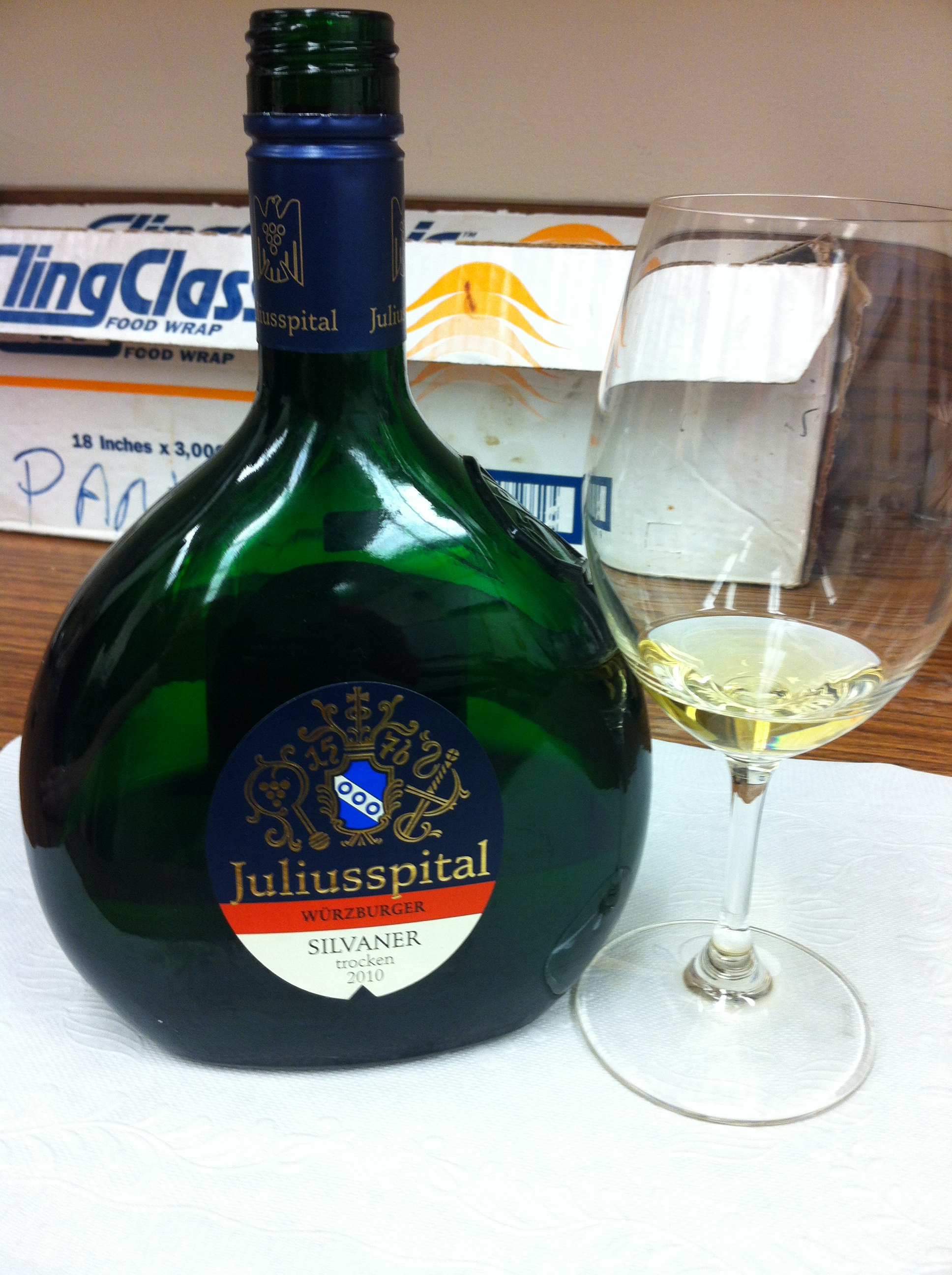
A Silvaner wine from Franconia

Because of the special soil and the mild climate along the Main river, wines with a very high mineralisation can be harvested. The amount of minerals in the wine is a factor in the quality testing every Franconian wine is subjected to. This is unique in Germany. The majority of the wines are made from one grape variety at a time. Cuvées – special blends or selected vats of higher quality – are rare. It is said that the wines of the typical Silvaner are the best wines from this grape in the world.

Most Franconian wines are dry. Although in German law dry wines are allowed 9 grams of residual sugar, many German wineries are still using the term Fränkisch trocken (Franconian dry) for wines with 5 grams of residual sugar or less. About 12,000 to 14,000 wines from Franconia pass the official testing.

As in most German wine regions, the exact vineyard site (Lage) where the wine comes from is nearly as important as the winery. Apart from the Steinwein, very few people outside Franconia – and nearly no one outside Germany – is familiar with the site names, mainly because the German Lagen are tiny compared to some of the well-known appellations of France, Italy, and Spain. Today many wineries have tried to introduce their own brands without the vineyard designation, and with cuvées a brand name rather than a single grape varietal.

Franconian wines vary in how long they can be kept. The basic wines, which are called Qualitätswein or Kabinett are made to be drunk one to three years after production. If they are kept too long, the wines lose their typical fruitiness and freshness. The best wines are mainly the dry Spätlesen which are full-bodied and can mature for up to six, sometimes ten years. The rare sweet wines often with noble rot, and Eisweins, can sometimes mature for 50 years or more. Oak matured red wines should be drunk three to ten years after production if kept in a good wine cellar.

== Grape varieties ==
Originally the Silvaner was the most important grape. In the 20th century the Müller-Thurgau, a simple grape, has been planted in large areas. Although the amount of Müller Thurgau has been decreasing for the last ten years, it is still the most widely cultivated grape in Franconia.

Red grape varieties cover 17% of the region's vineyard area.

The most cultivated grape varieties, by area in 2022, were:

white	area (share)	red	area (share)
Silvaner	1,560 ha (24.9%)	Domina	299 ha (4.8%)
Müller-Thurgau	1,414 ha (22.5%)	Spätburgunder	293 ha (4.7%)
Bacchus	744 ha (11.9%)	Dornfelder	131 ha (2.1%)
Riesling	346 ha (5.5%)	Regent	125 ha (2.0%)
Weißer Burgunder	230 ha (3.7%)	Schwarzriesling	63 ha (1.0%)
Scheurebe	203 ha (3.2%)	Schwarzriesling	79 ha (1.3%)
Kerner	157 ha (2.5%)	Acolon	47 ha (0.7%)
Pinot gris	106 ha (1.7%)	Portugieser	44 ha (0.7%)

== The Bocksbeutel ==
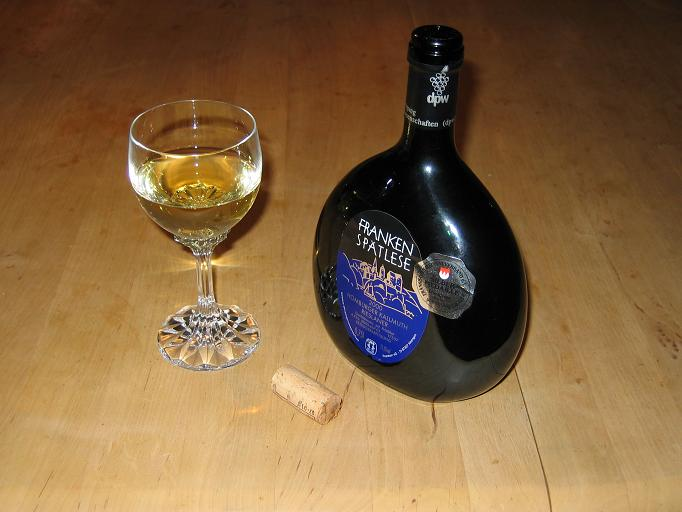
Bocksbeutel containing Franconian wine

The rounded and flattened Bocksbeutel is the typical and well known bottle originally used only for the best Franconian wines. Since 1989 the use of the Bocksbeutel has been protected by European Union regulations, but some other regions beside Franconia are also allowed to use this bottle shape.

== Wine and lifestyle ==
Unlike many other German wine regions, a large amount of Franconian wine is drunk in the area where it is produced. Nearly every town has its own Weinfest, a festival that lasts a weekend, or sometimes just one day, where wine is drunk instead of beer. The so-called Heckenwirtschaften are very popular small outlets where wineries sell their own wine, usually at reasonable prices.

== See also ==
- Franconian Wine Queen
- List of Franconian wine towns

== External links (German) ==
- Weinbaugebiet Franken
- Winzergemeinschaft Franken (GWF)
