= Wiesenfeld =

Wiesenfeld may refer to:

== Place name ==
- Wiesenfeld, Eichsfeld, a municipality in the Eichsfeld district, Thuringia, Germany
- Wiesenfeld, part of Geisa in the Wartburg district, Thuringia, Germany
- Wiesenfeld (Karlstadt), a Franconian wine town in Germany

== Other uses ==
- Kurt Wiesenfeld, American physicist and academic
- Weinberger v. Wiesenfeld, a 1976 United States Supreme Court case dealing with equal protection

== See also ==
- Wiesenfelden
- Wiedenfeld (disambiguation)
