= Weidenfeld =

Weidenfeld may refer to:

== People with the surname ==
- Dov Berish Weidenfeld (1881–1965), the Chief Rabbi of Tshebin (Trzebinia), Poland
- Edward Weidenfeld (fl. 1971–1991), American lawyer
- George Weidenfeld, Baron Weidenfeld (1919–2016), British publisher, philanthropist and newspaper columnist
- Nick Weidenfeld (born c. 1979), American television producer and executive
- Sandra Payson Weidenfeld (1926–2004), American arts patron, socialite
- Annabelle Whitestone, Lady Weidenfeld, (born c. 1946), English former concert manager

== Other ==
- Weidenfeld & Nicolson, a British publisher

== See also ==
- Wiedenfeld (disambiguation)
- Wiesenfeld (disambiguation)
