= Würzburg (disambiguation) =

Würzburg is a city in Bavaria, Germany.

Würzburg may also refer to:

== People ==
- Adalbero of Würzburg (or Saint Adalbero) (c. 1010–1090), Bishop of Würzburg and Count of Lambach-Wels
- Burchard of Würzburg (in German Burkard or Burkhard; died c. 750), Anglo-Saxon missionary
- John of Würzburg (Latin Johannes Herbipolensis), German priest who made a pilgrimage to the Holy Land in the 1160s
- Veit von Würzburg (1519–1577), Prince-Bishop of Bamberg

== Other uses ==
- Würzburg (district), a Landkreis in Bavaria, Germany
- Würzburg radar, a German radar system during World War II
- Wurzburg: Soviet-American Combat in the '70's, a 1975 Cold War board wargame simulating a hypothetical Soviet invasion of West Germany

== See also ==
- Würzburg Abbey (disambiguation)
- Wurzburger (disambiguation)
- Marienkirche, Würzburg, a chapel in Marienberg Fortress, Würzburg, Bavaria
- Hochschule für Musik Würzburg (University of Music, Würzburg)
- Mainfranken Theater Würzburg, a theatre in Würzburg, Germany
- Museum im Kulturspeicher Würzburg, a municipal art museum
