= Wurzburger (disambiguation) =

Wurzburger is a variety of white grape.

Wurzburger (or Würzburger) may also refer to:

== People ==
- Debby Wurzburger (born 1969), Canadian competitive swimmer
- Walter Wurzburger (1920–2002), rabbi and leader of Modern Orthodox Judaism

== Buildings ==
- Würzburger Hofbräu, a brewery in Würzburg, Germany
- Würzburger Residenz, a palace in Würzburg, Germany

== Other uses ==
- Würzburger Trap, a chess opening trap in the Vienna Gambit
- Würzburger FV, a German association football club from the city of Würzburg
- Würzburger Kickers, a German association football club playing in Würzburg, Bavaria
- Würzburger Stein, a vineyard in the German wine region of Franconia
