= Rohrgraben =

Rohrgraben may refer to:

- Rohrgraben (Werra), a river of Thuringia, Germany, tributary of the Werra
- Rohrgraben (Aisch), a river of Bavaria, Germany, tributary of the Aisch
