= Prosselsheim =

- Municipality
- Municipal part of Püssensheim

- Coat of arms

- Location of Prosselsheim within Würzburg district
- Interactive map of Prosselsheim
- Location within Germany Location within Bavaria
- Coordinates: 49°52′N 10°8′E
- Country: Germany
- State: Bavaria
- Admin. region: Unterfranken
- District: Würzburg
- Municipal assoc.: Estenfeld

Government
  - Mayor (2020–26): Birgit Börger (CSU)

Area
  - Total: 20.03 km^{2} (7.73 sq mi)
- Elevation: 269 m (883 ft)

Population (2025-12-31)
  - Total: 1,152
  - Density: 57.51/km^{2} (149.0/sq mi)
- Time zone: UTC+01:00 (CET)
  - Summer (DST): UTC+02:00 (CEST)
- Postal codes: 97279
- Dialling codes: 09386
- Vehicle registration: WÜ
- Website: www.prosselsheim.de

Prosselsheim is a municipality in the district of Würzburg in Bavaria, Germany.
