= St. Michael, Kaubenheim =

Catholic pilgrimage church

Coordinates: 49.5403°N 10.4600°E

St. Michael
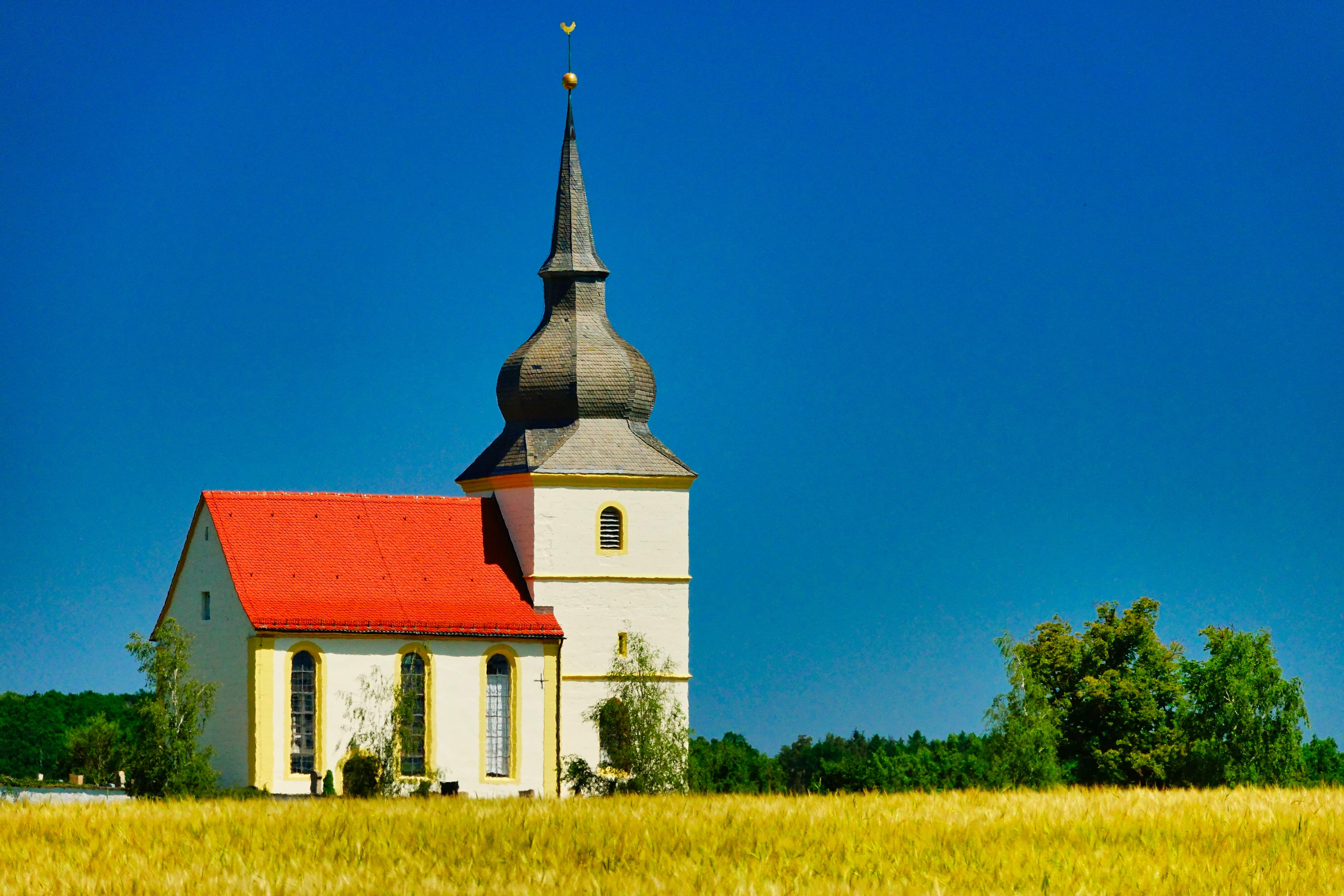
- Exterior

Religion
- Affiliation: Lutheran
- Ecclesiastical or organizational status: Chapel; Listed monument
- Leadership: Deanery of Bad Windsheim

Location
- Location: Kaubenheim, Bavaria, Germany
- Interactive map of St. Michael

Architecture
- Completed: 1717

St. Michael is a Lutheran chapel on a hill near Kaubenheim, part of Ipsheim, Bavaria, Germany. The building is named after Michael the Archangel. The building is also called Bergkirche (Mountain church) for its prominent location. The chapel had to be rebuilt after a fire in 1687. It is a listed monument, where services are held in summer and for Christmas.

== History ==
The chapel probably began as a cemetery chapel in the 11th or 12th century on a hill near Kaubenheim, because swampy grounds in the valley did not permit burials. The building is named after Michael the Archangel, who is considered to be the guardian of the Christian church.

The chapel is documented first by Lutheran church records (Kirchenbücher) in 1533. In the present building, only interior features in the tower date back to the medieval chapel, which was damaged by fire caused by lightning on 21 March 1687. The building was restored from 1695 to 1702, with the nave completed in 1696.

Interior features were installed until 1717. The pulpit was bought around 1699, probably from the parish in Ipsheim. Christoph Rösler created 18 paintings on canvas in 1701 and 1702. They depict Biblical topics and were installed at the balustrade of the balcony. A third bell was acquired with a donation from Martin Dennler, the school master, in 1745. At the same time, a new organ was built. The interior was remodelled in 1862.

The chapel was equipped with electricity around 1980. The interior was restored between 1986 and 1988, and the exterior from 2014 to 2016. The building is a listed monument. Services are usually held from Easter to Kirchweihe in October, and for Christmas and New Year's Eve.
