= Bukettraube =

Variety of grape

- Grape (Vitis)
- Color of berry skin: Blanc
- Species: Vitis vinifera
- Also called: Bouquettraube, Bouquet Blanc, Sylvaner Musqué or Bukettrebe,
- Origin: Randersacker, Germany
- Original pedigree: Silvaner × Schiava Grossa
- Notable regions: France, Germany, South Africa
- VIVC number: 1611

Bukettraube (/bu-ket-trau-be/), also called Bouquet Blanc, Bouquettraube, Sylvaner Musqué or Bukettrebe, is a variety of white grape of German origin. Sebastian Englerth is supposed to have created it in Randersacker in the 19th century, although an Alsatian origin has also been claimed. Bukettraube is a cross of Silvaner and Schiava Grossa.

== Appearance ==
Conical bunches, with round bronze or yellow-green firm grapes with a tough skin.

== Smell and taste ==
Wines from Bukettraube is often described as having a Muscat-like bouquet. Tastes include: peaches, apricot, and pear. When oaked, the wines may also have slight buttery or spicy undertones.

== Growing locations ==
Due to the limited shelf life of Bukettraube wine (less than a year), the varietal wine is rarely traded over any distance and the variety is grown only in a few locations. While not a common variety anywhere, the most prominent plantations are those of South Africa, and there are some very small plantations in Germany, France (Alsace), Spain and Zimbabwe. In recent years the most notable of crops have been coming out of South Africa.

== Synonyms ==
Bukettraube is also known under the synonyms Bocksbeutel, Bouquet Blanc, Bouquet Traube, Bouquettraube, Boxer, Buket, Bukettrebe, Bukettriesling, Sylvaner Musqué, Würzburger.
