= Eisenheim =

- Municipality
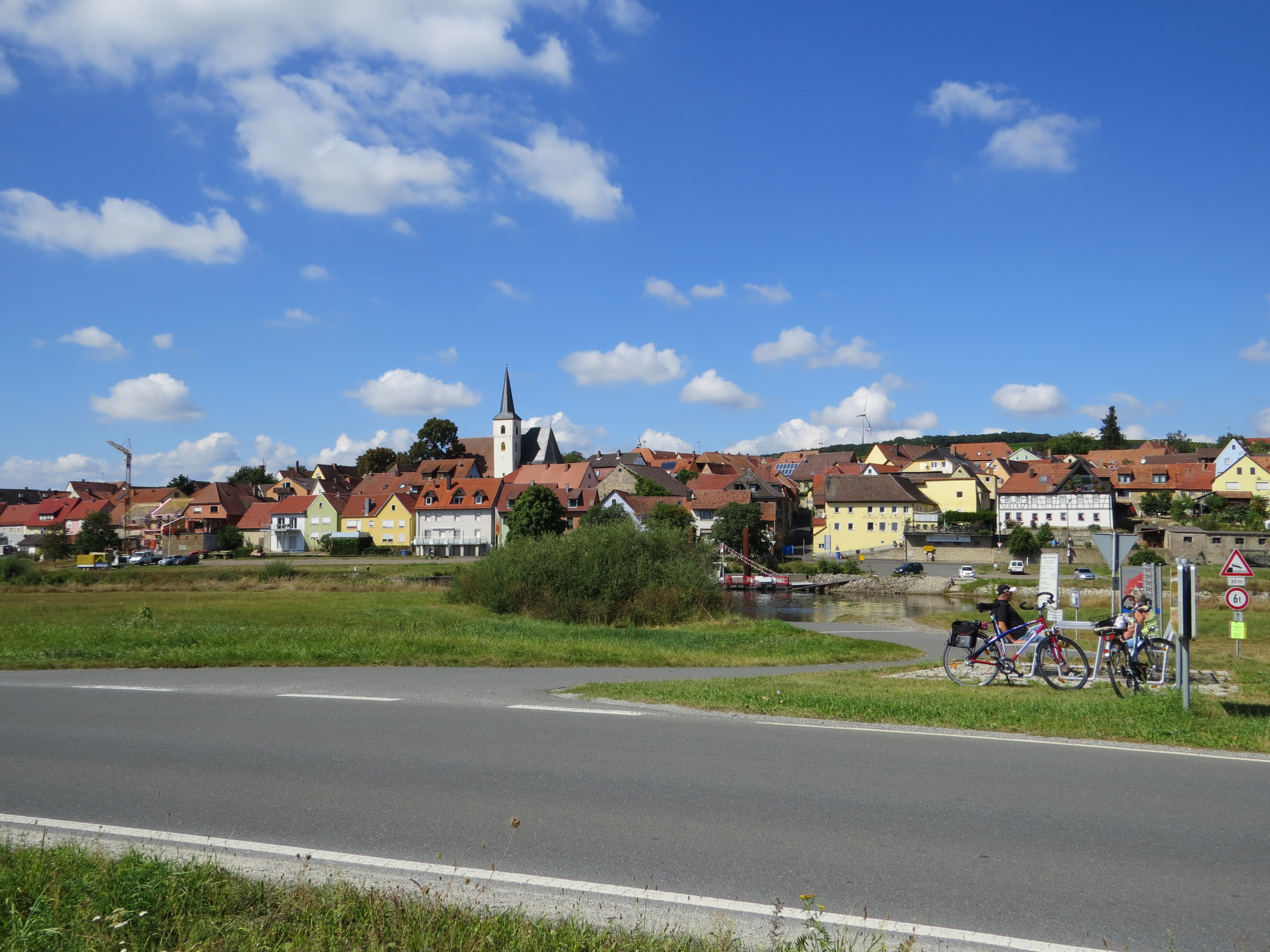
- Obereisenheim

- Coat of arms

- Location of Eisenheim within Würzburg district
- Interactive map of Eisenheim
- Location within Germany Location within Bavaria
- Coordinates: 49°53′N 10°10′E
- Country: Germany
- State: Bavaria
- Admin. region: Unterfranken
- District: Würzburg
- Municipal assoc.: Estenfeld
- Subdivisions: 4 Ortsteile

Government
  - Mayor (2020–26): Christian Holzinger (SPD)

Area
  - Total: 11.56 km^{2} (4.46 sq mi)
- Elevation: 200 m (660 ft)

Population (2025-12-31)
  - Total: 1,314
  - Density: 113.7/km^{2} (294.4/sq mi)
- Time zone: UTC+01:00 (CET)
  - Summer (DST): UTC+02:00 (CEST)
- Postal codes: 97247
- Dialling codes: 09386
- Vehicle registration: WÜ, OCH
- Website: www.eisenheim.info

Eisenheim is a market town and municipality in the district of Würzburg in Bavaria, Germany. It lies on the river Main.

== Notable people ==
- Karl Friedrich Cerf, German theatre manager

== See also ==
- List of Franconian wine towns
