= Eibelstadt (Verwaltungsgemeinschaft) =

- Verwaltungsgemeinschaft
- Location of Eibelstadt within Würzburg district
- Interactive map of Eibelstadt
- Location within Germany Location within Bavaria
- Coordinates: 49°44′N 10°00′E
- Country: Germany
- State: Bavaria
- Admin. region: Lower Franconia
- District: Würzburg
- Seat: Eibelstadt
- Subdivisions: 4 municipalities

Area
  - Total: 33.56 km^{2} (12.96 sq mi)

Population (2025-12-31)
  - Total: 7,558
  - Density: 225.2/km^{2} (583.3/sq mi)
- Time zone: UTC+01:00 (CET)
  - Summer (DST): UTC+02:00 (CEST)
- Website: www.vgem-eibelstadt.de

Eibelstadt is a Verwaltungsgemeinschaft (municipal association) in the district of Würzburg in Bavaria, Germany. Its seat is in Eibelstadt.

It consists of the following municipalities:

1. Eibelstadt
2. Frickenhausen am Main
3. Sommerhausen
4. Winterhausen
