= Kaubenheim =

- Village of Ipsheim
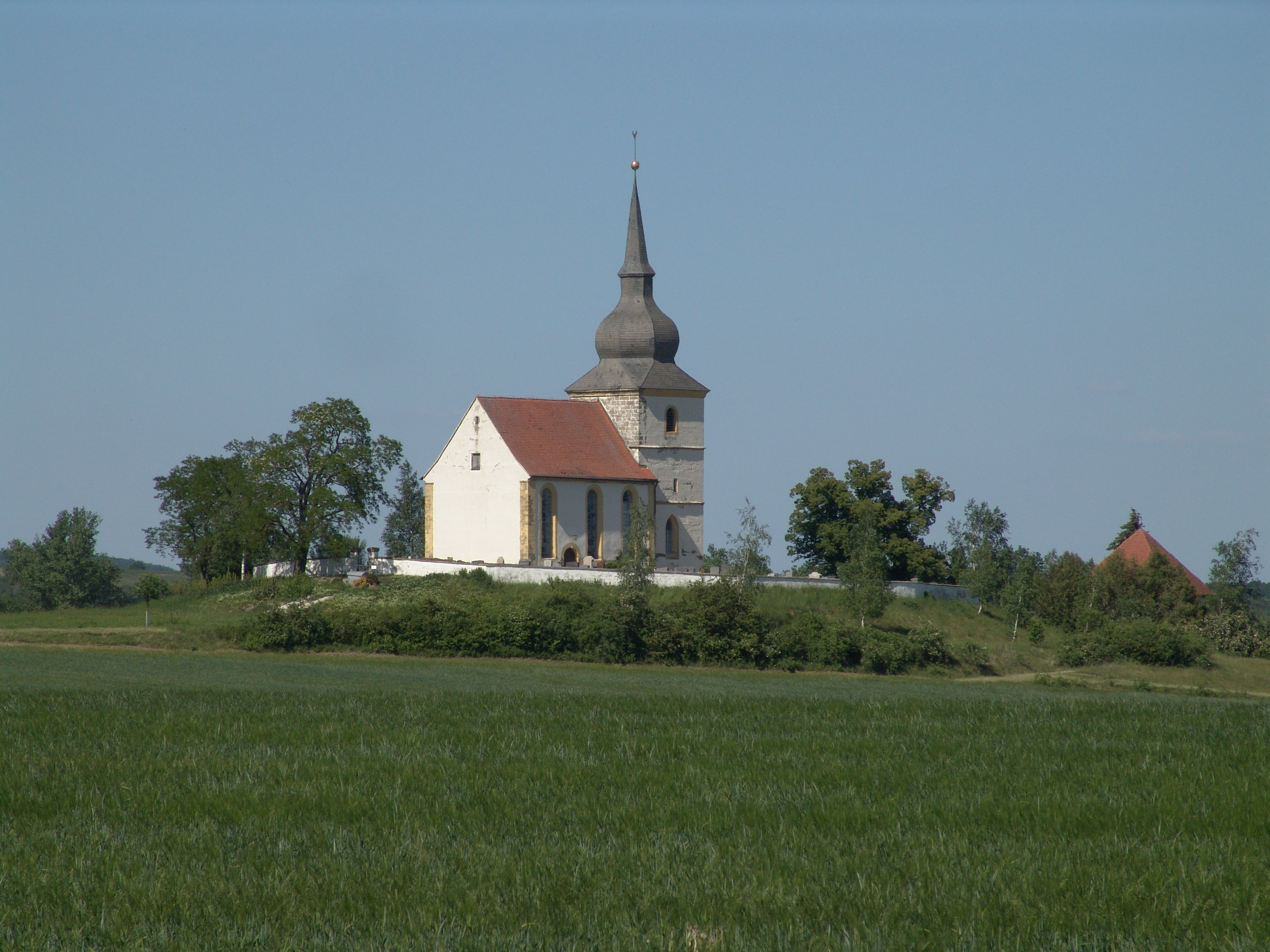
- St. Michael
- Interactive map of Kaubenheim
- Location within Germany Location within Bavaria
- Coordinates: 49°32′32″N 10°28′08″E
- Country: Germany
- State: Bavaria
- Admin. region: Mittelfranken
- District: Neustadt a.d.Aisch-Bad Windsheim
- Municipality: Ipsheim
- Time zone: UTC+01:00 (CET)
  - Summer (DST): UTC+02:00 (CEST)

Kaubenheim is a village in Germany, and is part of the municipality of Ipsheim, Bavaria.

The village is home to the Lutheran chapel St. Michael, which was completed in 1717.
