= Rohrgraben (Aisch) =

River in Germany

Location
- Country: Germany
- State: Bavaria

Physical characteristics
- Source
  - location: South of Mailheim, a district of Ipsheim
  - coordinates: 49.5009°N 10.4982°E
- Mouth
  - location: near Lenkersheim, a district of Bad Windsheim, into the Aisch
  - coordinates: 49.5097°N 10.4604°E

Basin features
- Progression: Aisch→ Regnitz→ Main→ Rhine→ North Sea

Rohrgraben is a river of Bavaria, Germany.

The Rohrgraben springs south of Mailheim, a district of the municipality Ipsheim. It is a right tributary of the Aisch after Lenkersheim, a district of Bad Windsheim.

== See also ==
- List of rivers of Bavaria
