= Estenfeld (Verwaltungsgemeinschaft) =

- Verwaltungsgemeinschaft
- Location of Estenfeld within Würzburg district
- Interactive map of Estenfeld
- Location within Germany Location within Bavaria
- Coordinates: 49°50′N 10°01′E
- Country: Germany
- State: Bavaria
- Admin. region: Lower Franconia
- District: Würzburg
- Seat: Estenfeld
- Subdivisions: 3 municipalities

Area
  - Total: 49.72 km^{2} (19.20 sq mi)

Population (2025-12-31)
  - Total: 7,757
  - Density: 156.0/km^{2} (404.1/sq mi)
- Time zone: UTC+01:00 (CET)
  - Summer (DST): UTC+02:00 (CEST)
- Website: www.vg-estenfeld.de

Estenfeld is a Verwaltungsgemeinschaft (municipal association) in the district of Würzburg in Bavaria, Germany. Its seat is in Estenfeld.

It consists of the following municipalities:

1. Eisenheim
2. Estenfeld
3. Prosselsheim
