= Unterleinach =

Coordinates: 49°52′N 9°48′E

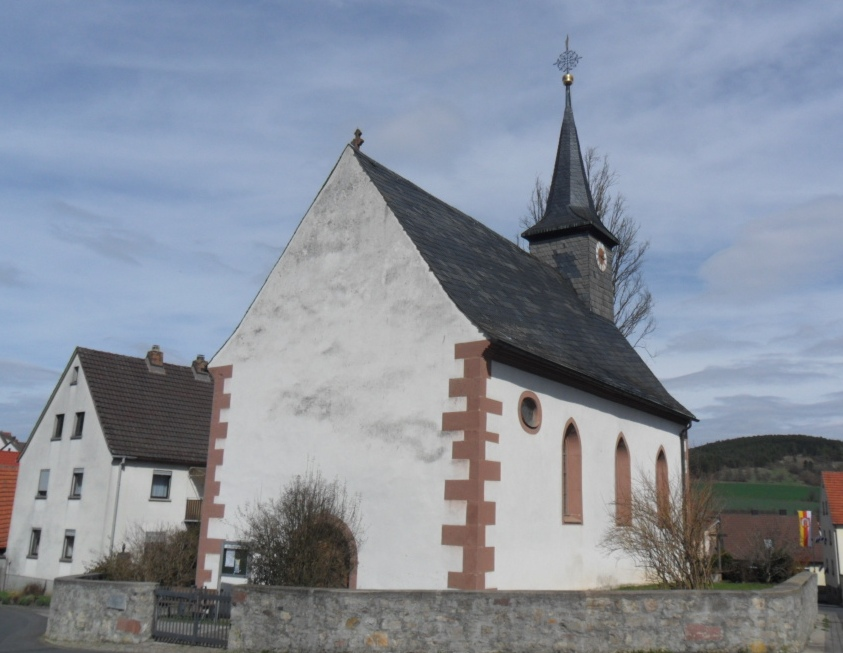
Church of Saint Peter

Unterleinach is a village situated outside of Würzburg, Germany. It is part of the municipality of Leinach. It is located south of Oberleinach. In 1976 Unterleinach celebrated its 1200th anniversary.

Unterleinach and Oberleinach have rival soccer teams.

Some mound graves have been discovered in the forest surrounding the town and a tower attributed to the huns is still intact.
