= Estenfeld =

- Municipality
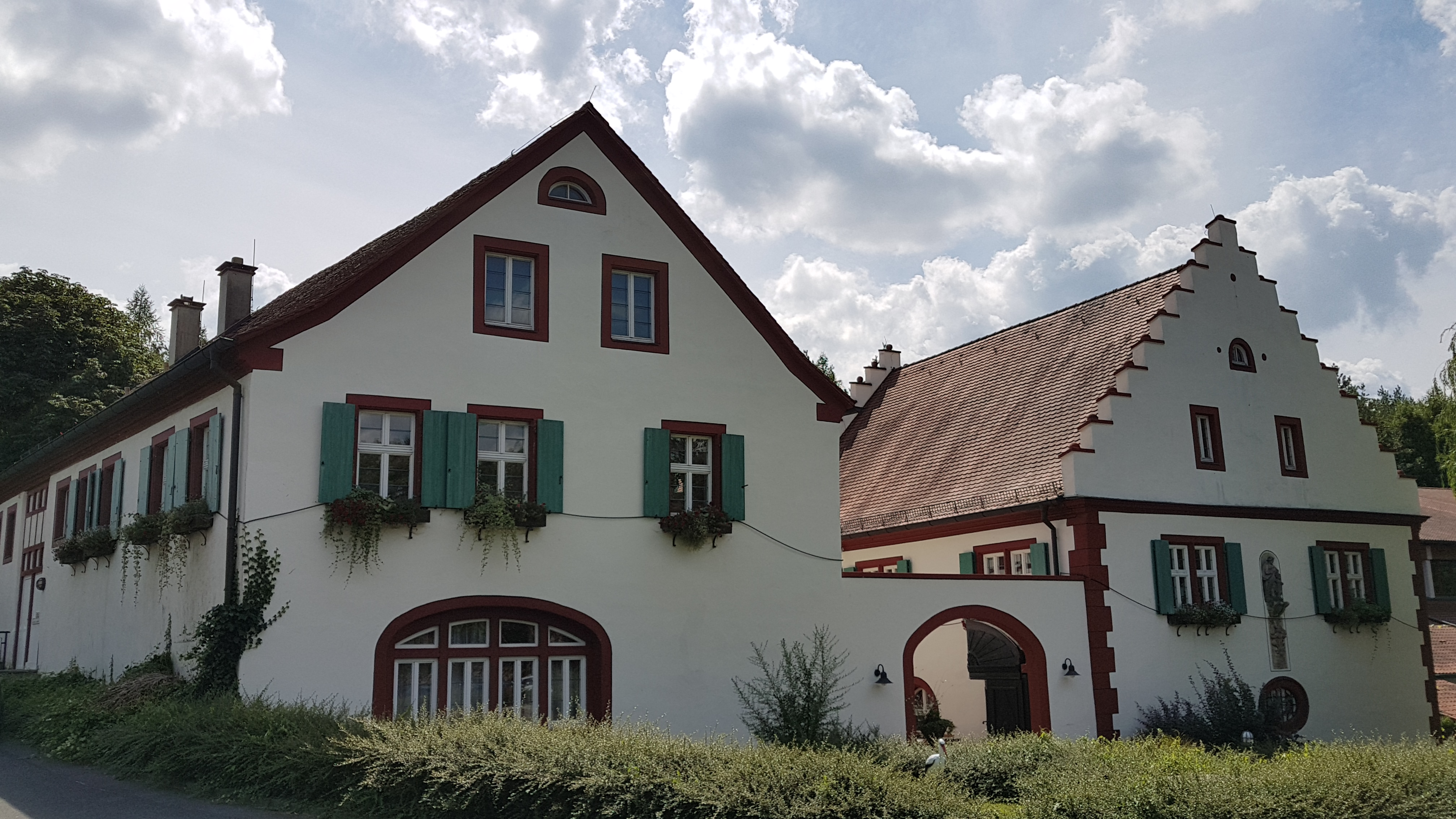
- White Mills in the village

- Coat of arms

- Location of Estenfeld within Würzburg district
- Interactive map of Estenfeld
- Location within Germany Location within Bavaria
- Coordinates: 49°49′41.02″N 10°00′26.92″E
- Country: Germany
- State: Bavaria
- Admin. region: Unterfranken
- District: Würzburg
- Municipal assoc.: Estenfeld
- Subdivisions: 2 Ortsteile

Government
  - Mayor (2020–26): Rosalinde Schraud (CSU)

Area
  - Total: 18.12 km^{2} (7.00 sq mi)
- Elevation: 246 m (807 ft)

Population (2025-12-31)
  - Total: 5,291
  - Density: 292.0/km^{2} (756.3/sq mi)
- Time zone: UTC+01:00 (CET)
  - Summer (DST): UTC+02:00 (CEST)
- Postal codes: 97230
- Dialling codes: 09305
- Vehicle registration: WÜ
- Website: www.estenfeld.net

Estenfeld is a municipality in the district of Würzburg in Bavaria in Germany.
