= Karl Friedrich Cerf =

German theatrical manager

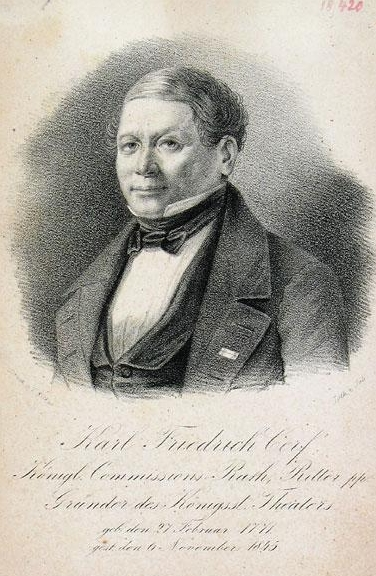
Karl Friedrich Cerf

Karl Friedrich Cerf (27 February 1771, Unter-Eisenheim-on-the-Main, Landkreis Würzburg, Germany - 6 November 1845, Berlin) was a German theatrical manager.

Cerf was born Jewish but embraced Christianity when very young. He had to support his father's family when only 17 years old. After having been engaged for many years in the horse trade at Dessau, he rose to the post of chief military agent, and in this capacity took part in the campaign of 1813–15, under Count Peter Wittgenstein, general of the Imperial Russian army. The courage and fidelity displayed by Cerf won for him the favor of Emperor Alexander I, who conferred on him a gold medal.

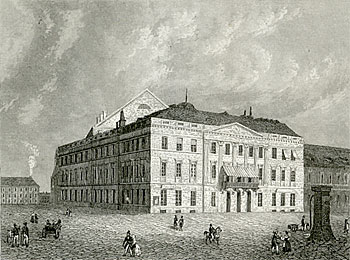
The Königsstädtisches Theater Berlin 1824-1851

Cerf then settled at Berlin, and in 1822 obtained from Friedrich Wilhelm III a perpetual grant for the erection of the Königsstädtisches Theater. The theater opened on 4 August 1824 in the street Alexanderstraße. It was devoted to French comedy and Italian opera. Cerf managed it until his death.

His son Rudolf Cerf was also a Berlin theater owner and manager, inheriting the theater concession from his father. On 12 October 1852 he opened the Neues Königstädtisches Theater. In 1855 he also opened the Königstädtisches Vaudeville-Theater.

== Bibliography ==
- Allgemeine Deutsche Biographie, iv. 89
- J. F. A. de Le Roi, Geschichte der Evangelischen Juden-Mission, p. 249
