= Domina (grape) =

Variety of grape

- Grape (Vitis)
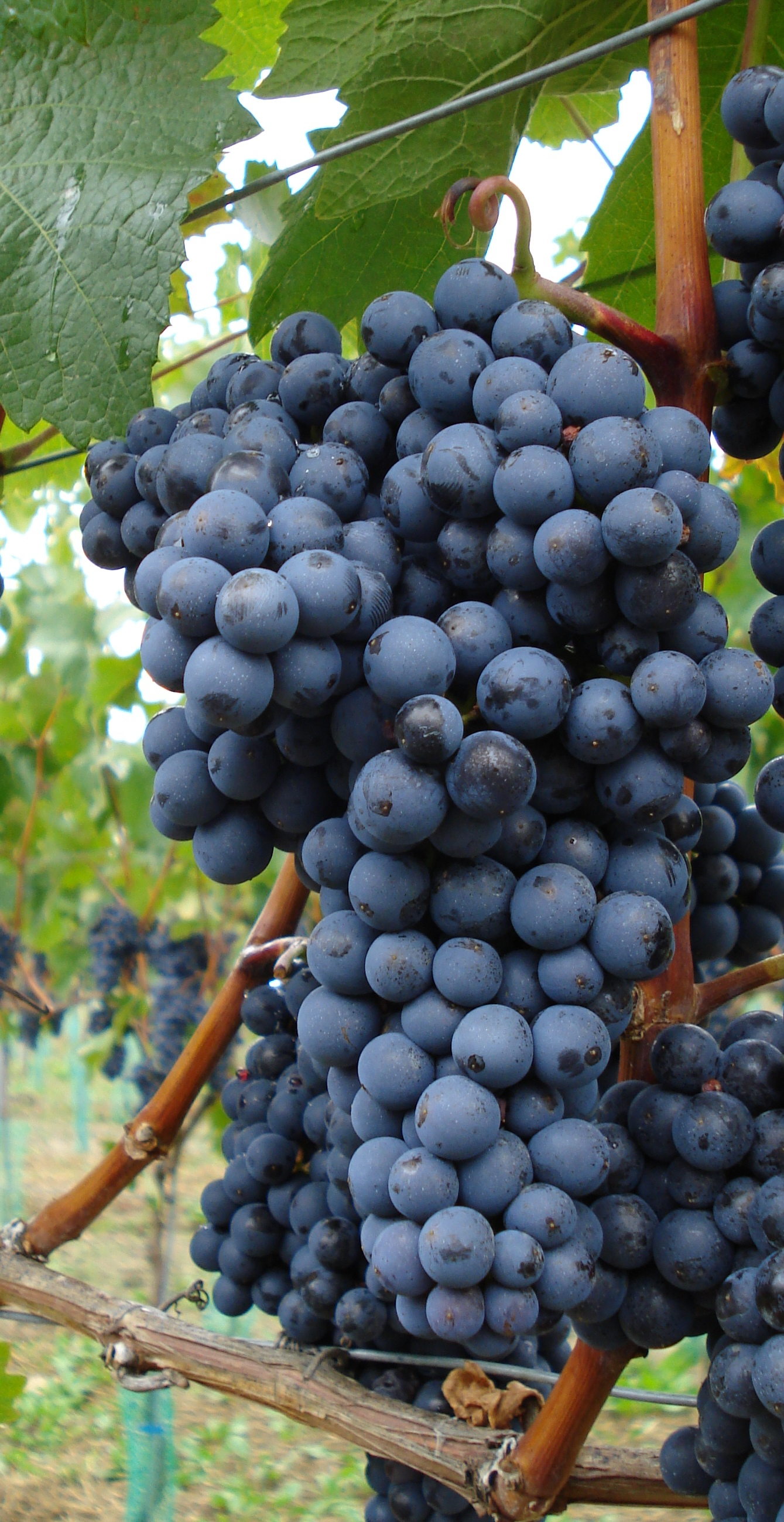
- Species: Vitis vinifera
- Also called: Geilweilerhof 4- 25- 7
- Origin: Siebeldingen, Palatinate, Germany
- VIVC number: 3632

Domina is a dark-skinned variety of grape used for red wine. It was created by German viticulturalist Peter Morio at the Geilweilerhof Institute for Grape Breeding in the Palatinate in 1927 by crossing the varieties Blauer Portugieser and Pinot noir (known in Germany as Spätburgunder).

Work on the variety was the continued by Bernhard Husfeld at the same institute in the 1950s. The variety received protection and was released for general cultivation in 1974.

In 2006, there were 395 hectares (980 acres) of Domina in Germany, with an increasing trend. Domina plantings are primarily found in Franconia. Domina wines are dark red and rich in tannin. In Belgium, it is authorised for AOCs : Hageland and Haspengouw.

Domina gives high yields and is not very demanding with respect to vineyard conditions. It ripens later than its parent Blauer Portugieser but earlier than its parent Pinot noir. Domina wines are full-bodied and have a deep colour, but are not considered as elegant as German-grown Spätburgunder.

== Synonyms ==
The only synonym to Domina is the variety's breeding code Geilweilerhof 4-25-7 or Gf. IV-25-7 N.
