= Eibelstadt =

- Town
- Coat of arms

- Location of Eibelstadt within Würzburg district
- Interactive map of Eibelstadt
- Location within Germany Location within Bavaria
- Coordinates: 49°43′25.97″N 10°0′3.35″E
- Country: Germany
- State: Bavaria
- Admin. region: Unterfranken
- District: Würzburg
- Municipal assoc.: Eibelstadt

Government
  - Mayor (2020–26): Markus Schenk (CSU)

Area
  - Total: 7.07 km^{2} (2.73 sq mi)
- Elevation: 180 m (590 ft)

Population (2025-12-31)
  - Total: 3,089
  - Density: 437/km^{2} (1,130/sq mi)
- Time zone: UTC+01:00 (CET)
  - Summer (DST): UTC+02:00 (CEST)
- Postal codes: 97246
- Dialling codes: 09303
- Vehicle registration: WÜ
- Website: www.eibelstadt.de

Eibelstadt (German pronunciation: [ˈaɪbl̩ˌʃtat]) is a town in the district of Würzburg, in Bavaria, Germany.

== Geography ==
Eibelstadt is situated among vineyards on the right bank of the Main, 10 km southeast of Würzburg.

== History ==
The city was founded in 787 in the time of Charles the Great. In 1434 German Emperor Sigismund bestowed municipal rights after the civilians had supported his war against the Hussites. In the course of an administrative reform in Bavaria today's municipality was built in 1818.

=== Population dynamics ===
- 1970: 2.023
- 1987: 2.279
- 2000: 2.838
- 2005: 2.886
- 2010: 2.813
- 2015: 3.022

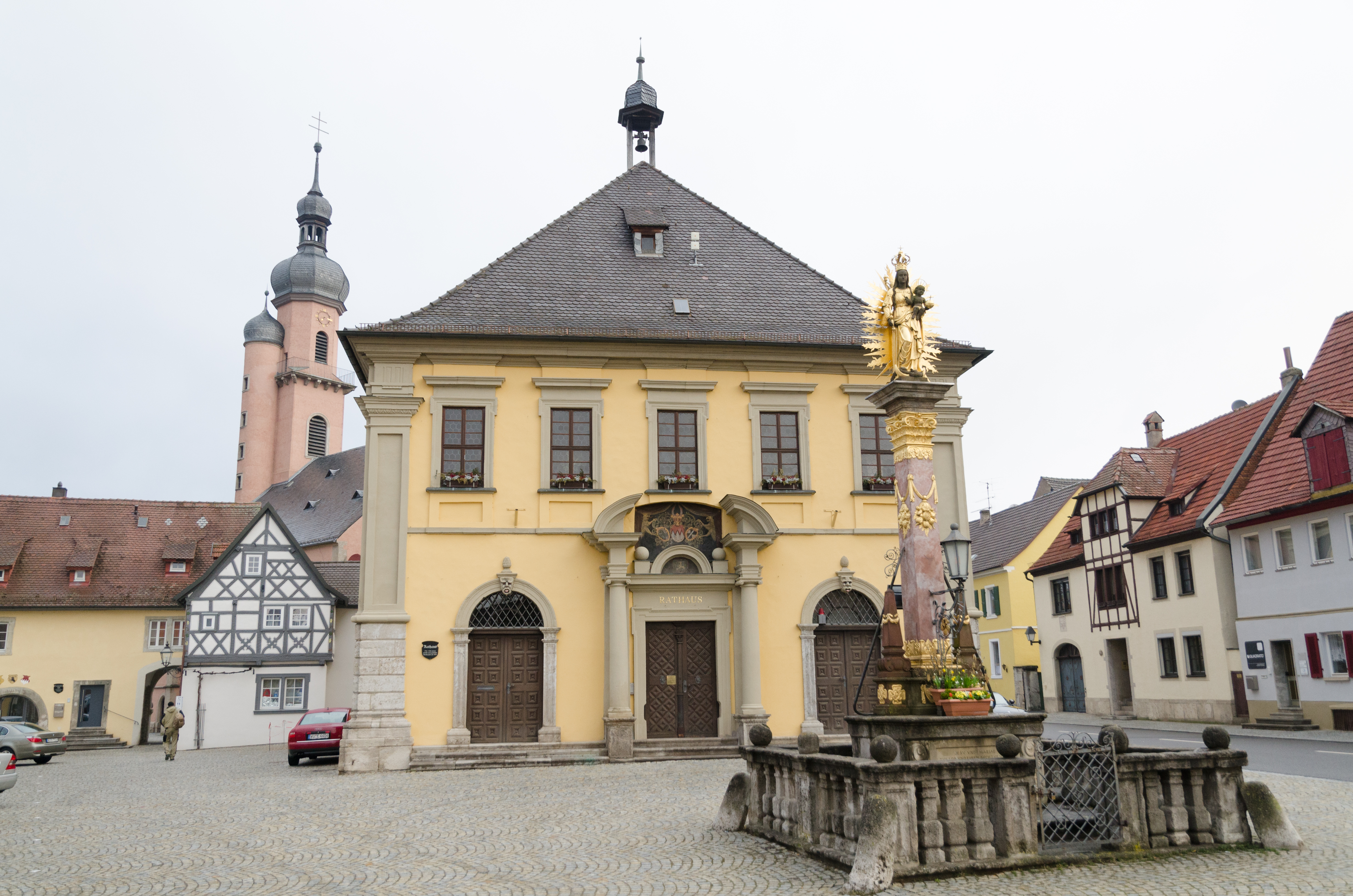
Eibelstadt Town hall

== Politics ==
Heinz Koch (SPD) has been the mayor of Eibelstadt 1990–2014. Since 2014 Markus Schenk (CSU) is the mayor.

=== City council ===
The 14 seats of the city council are distributed among the parties as follows:

- CSU 7 seats
- SPD 4 seats
- Alliance 90/The Greens 4 seats
- FDP 1 seat

(as of March 2020)

=== Coat of arms ===
The coat of arms consists of a half of a black lion with a golden crown. He grasps a rounded grape-vine with leaves and blue grapes in his pawns.

== Sights and culture ==
=== Sights ===
- completely preserved city wall (including the "Kereturm" (tower) from 1573)
- city square with a golden Marian column
- baroque building which used to be the location of the "Würzburger Domkapitel" (Würzburg Cathedral chapter)
- Church St. Nikolaus

=== Museums ===
- Museum of local history
- City archive

=== Music ===
Two male choirs (ATGV and Liederkranz), one female choir (Allgemeiner Turn- und Gesangverein Eibelstadt), two mixed choirs (Heart and Soul; Sound of Downtown) as well as a two traditional bands.

== Economy & Public transport ==
=== Economy ===
In 1998 927 people were subject to social contribution, out of which 23 people were working in agriculture, 169 in industry, 274 in commerce and 153 people in other areas. There are six businesses in the building sector and 62 in agriculture. For agriculture, 140 hectares (350 acres) were in use, including 120 hectares (300 acres) for vineyards.

=== Public transport ===
The city is located at the Bundesstraße B 13, approximately 2 km from the highway exit "Würzburg-Randersacker" of the Autobahn A3. The closest train station can be found in Winterhausen, about 4 kilometres (2.5 mi) from Eibelstadt.

== Education ==
- Kindergarten including a nursery school
- Elementary school: 11 teachers and 274 students
- Library

Higher education available in Ochsenfurt and Würzburg.

== Notable citizens ==
- Maximilian Englert - Crown Prince of Eibelstadt
