= Sand am Main =

- Municipality
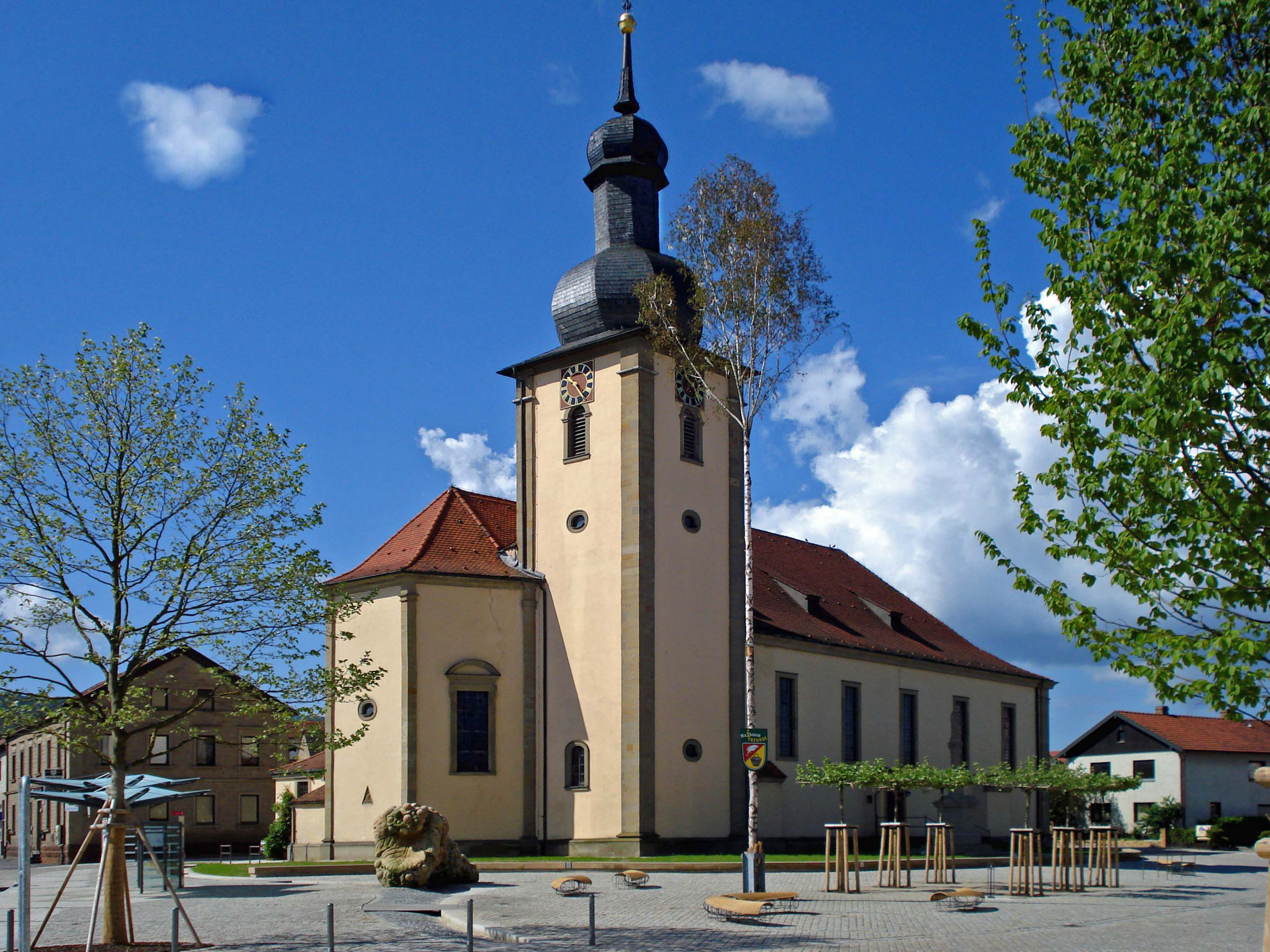
- Church of Saint Nicholas

- Coat of arms

- Location of Sand am Main within Haßberge district
- Interactive map of Sand am Main
- Location within Germany Location within Bavaria
- Coordinates: 49°59′N 10°36′E
- Country: Germany
- State: Bavaria
- Admin. region: Unterfranken
- District: Haßberge

Government
  - Mayor (2023–29): Jörg Kümmel

Area
  - Total: 7.44 km^{2} (2.87 sq mi)
- Elevation: 227 m (745 ft)

Population (2025-12-31)
  - Total: 3,033
  - Density: 408/km^{2} (1,060/sq mi)
- Time zone: UTC+01:00 (CET)
  - Summer (DST): UTC+02:00 (CEST)
- Postal codes: 97522
- Dialling codes: 09524
- Vehicle registration: HAS
- Website: www.sand-am-main.de

Sand is a municipality in the district of Haßberge in Bavaria in Germany. It lies on the river Main.
