= Repperndorf =

Coordinates: 49°45′03″N 10°07′22″E

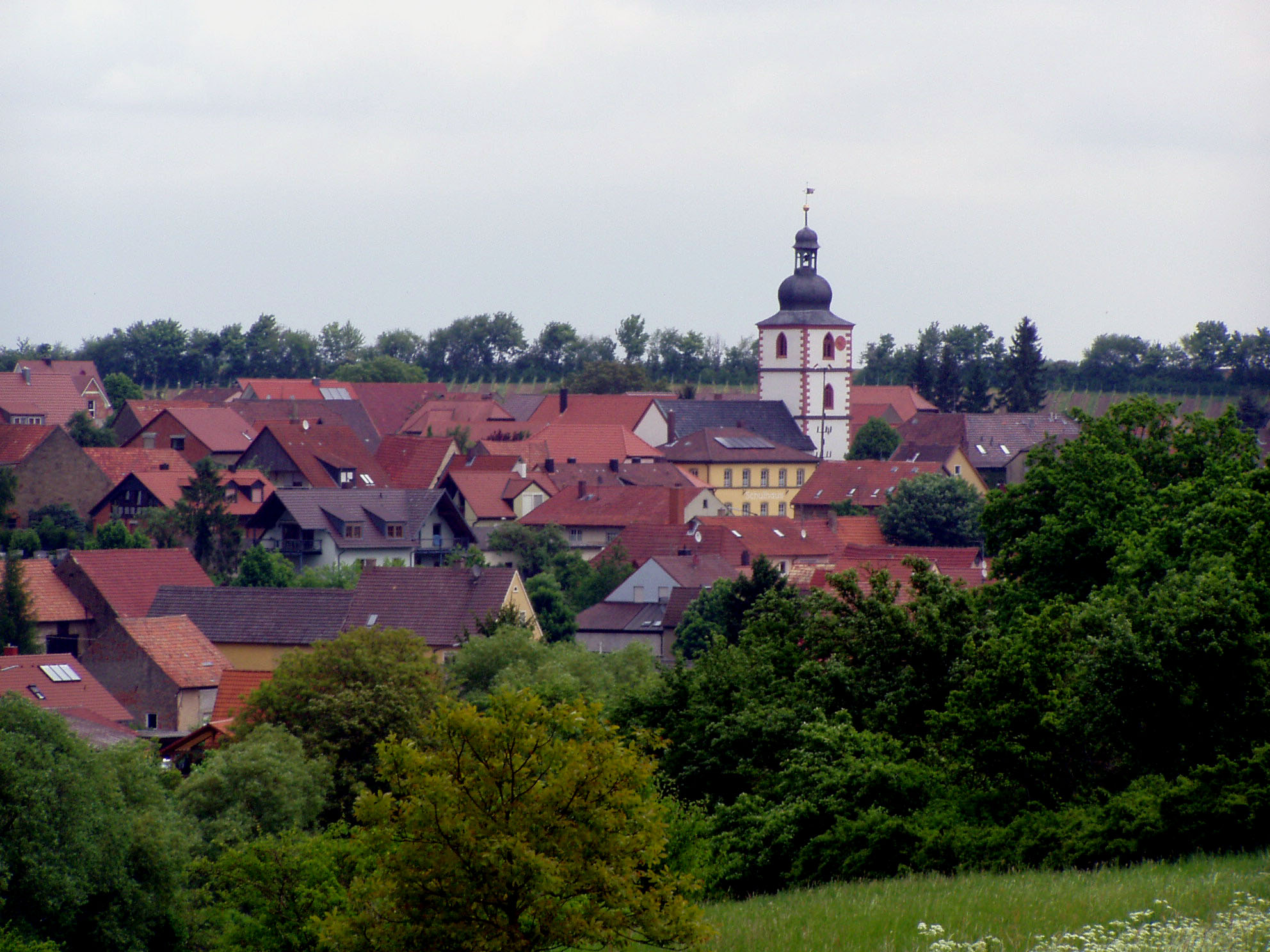
Repperndorf

Repperndorf is a village in the district of Kitzingen, Regierungsbezirk Lower Franconia, Bavaria, Germany. Formerly an independent municipality, it became part of the town of Kitzingen in January 1978.
