= Wiedenfeld =

Wiedenfeld or Weidenfeld may refer to:

- Boris Wiedenfeld, a jazz pianist and producer who has worked with Matthias Lupri
- Hugo von Wiedenfeld, an Austrian Jewish architect; see Türkischer Tempel

== See also ==
- Weidenfeld (disambiguation)
