= Leinach =

- Municipality
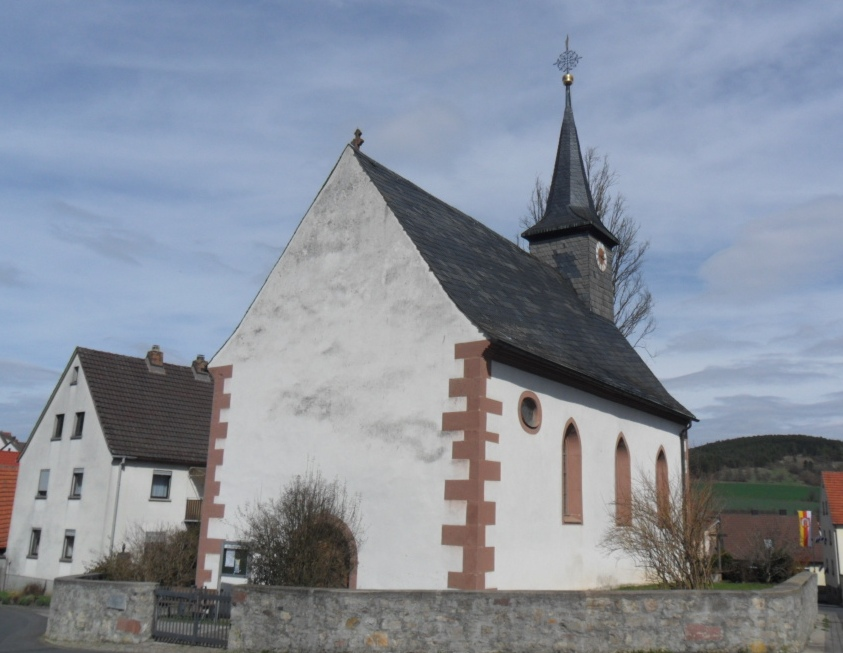
- Church of Saint Peter in Unterleinach

- Coat of arms

- Location of Leinach within Würzburg district
- Interactive map of Leinach
- Location within Germany Location within Bavaria
- Coordinates: 49°52′N 9°48′E
- Country: Germany
- State: Bavaria
- Admin. region: Unterfranken
- District: Würzburg

Government
  - Mayor (2020–26): Arno Mager

Area
  - Total: 28.01 km^{2} (10.81 sq mi)
- Elevation: 280 m (920 ft)

Population (2025-12-31)
  - Total: 3,245
  - Density: 115.9/km^{2} (300.1/sq mi)
- Time zone: UTC+01:00 (CET)
  - Summer (DST): UTC+02:00 (CEST)
- Postal codes: 97274
- Dialling codes: 09364
- Vehicle registration: WÜ
- Website: www.leinach.de

Leinach (German pronunciation: [ˈlaɪnax]) is a municipality in the district of Würzburg in Bavaria in Germany. It includes the villages of Unterleinach and Oberleinach.
