= Winterhausen =

- Municipality
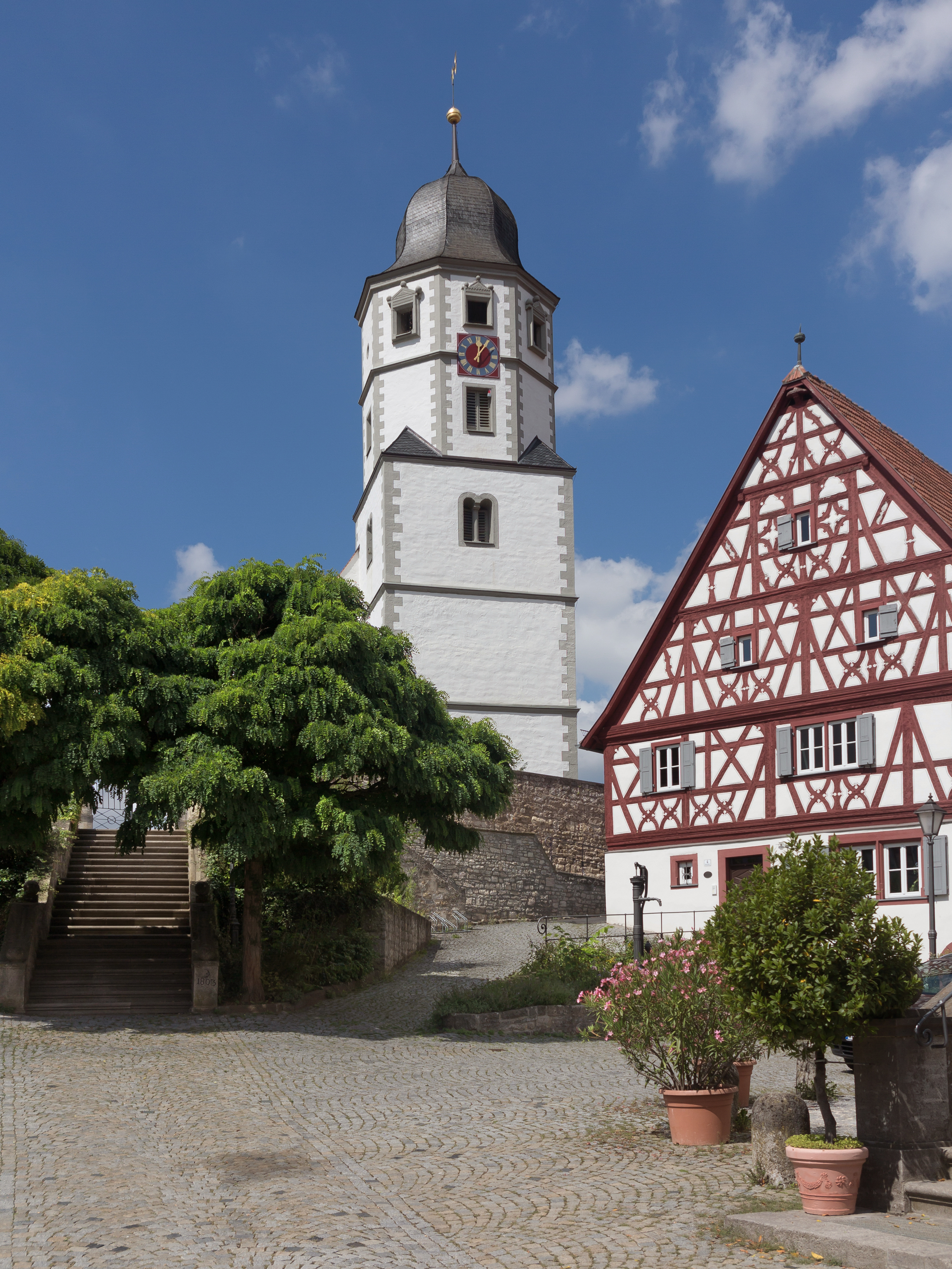
- Former Chapel of Saint Nicholas

- Coat of arms

- Location of Winterhausen within Würzburg district
- Interactive map of Winterhausen
- Location within Germany Location within Bavaria
- Coordinates: 49°42′N 10°1′E
- Country: Germany
- State: Bavaria
- Admin. region: Unterfranken
- District: Würzburg
- Municipal assoc.: Eibelstadt

Government
  - Mayor (2018–24): Christian Luksch

Area
  - Total: 8.72 km^{2} (3.37 sq mi)
- Elevation: 188 m (617 ft)

Population (2025-12-31)
  - Total: 1,386
  - Density: 159/km^{2} (412/sq mi)
- Time zone: UTC+01:00 (CET)
  - Summer (DST): UTC+02:00 (CEST)
- Postal codes: 97286
- Dialling codes: 09333
- Vehicle registration: WÜ
- Website: www.winterhausen.de

Winterhausen (German pronunciation: [vɪntɐˈhaʊ̯zn̩]) is a municipality in the district of Würzburg in Bavaria, Germany.
