= Theilheim =

- Municipality
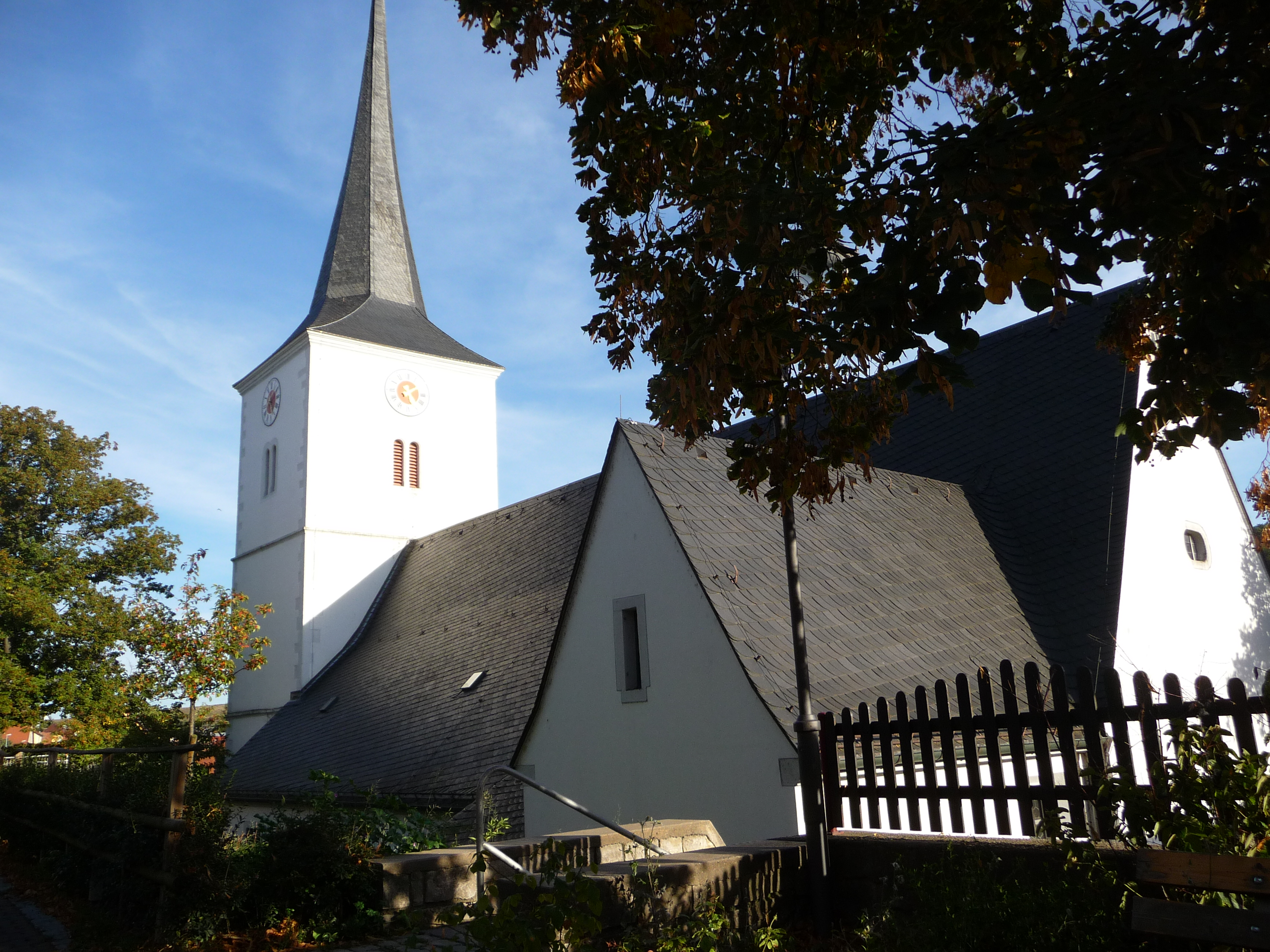
- Church of Saint John the Baptist

- Coat of arms

- Location of Theilheim within Würzburg district
- Interactive map of Theilheim
- Location within Germany Location within Bavaria
- Coordinates: 49°45′N 10°2′E
- Country: Germany
- State: Bavaria
- Admin. region: Unterfranken
- District: Würzburg

Government
  - Mayor (2020–26): Thomas Herpich

Area
  - Total: 9.69 km^{2} (3.74 sq mi)
- Elevation: 231 m (758 ft)

Population (2025-12-31)
  - Total: 2,310
  - Density: 238/km^{2} (617/sq mi)
- Time zone: UTC+01:00 (CET)
  - Summer (DST): UTC+02:00 (CEST)
- Postal codes: 97288
- Dialling codes: 09303
- Vehicle registration: WÜ
- Website: www.theilheim.de

Theilheim (German pronunciation: [ˈtaɪlhaɪm]) is a municipality in the district of Würzburg in Bavaria in Germany.
