= Würzburger Stein =

Vineyard

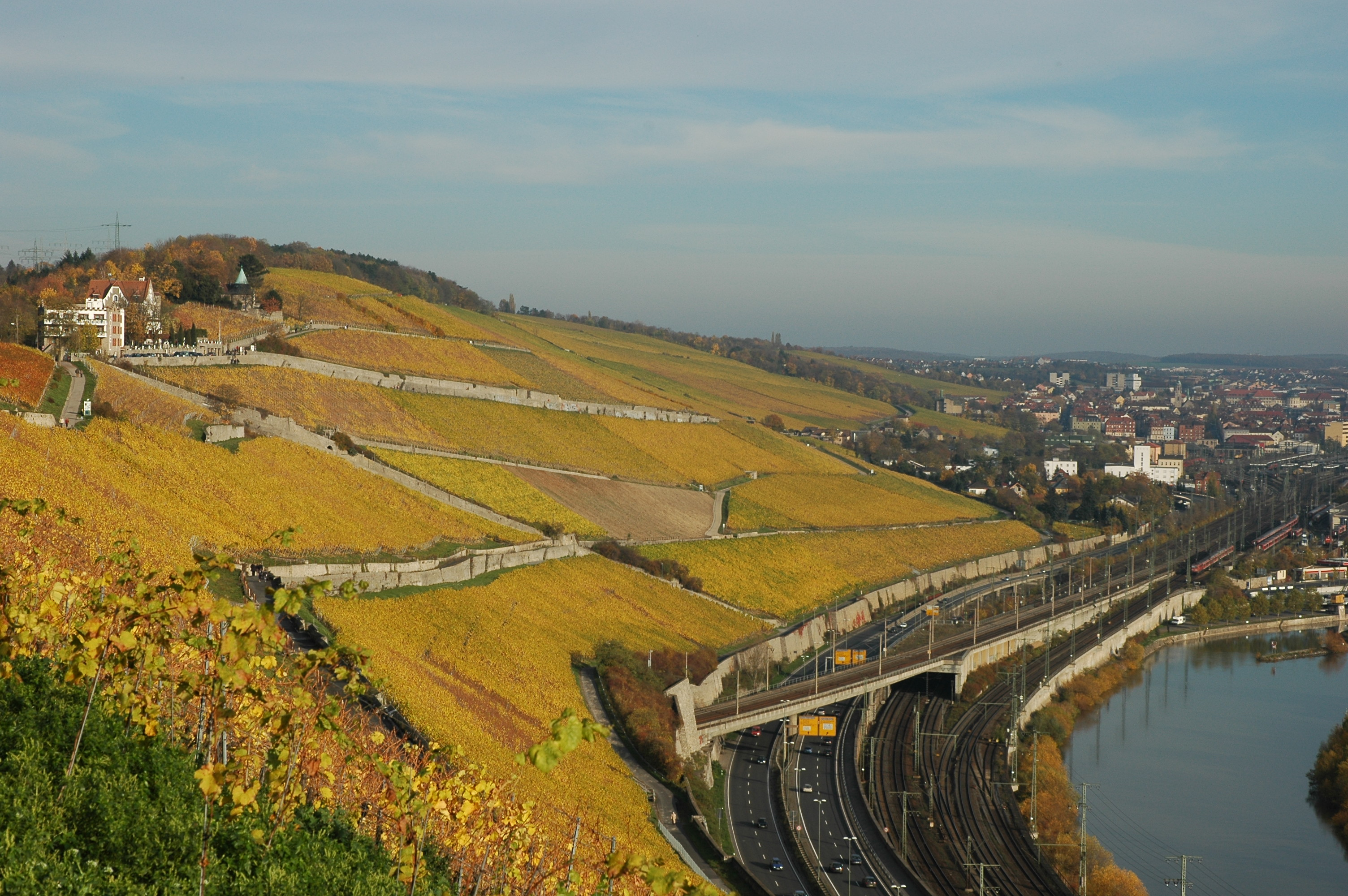
The Würzburger Stein vineyard overlooking the Main

Würzburger Stein

Würzburger Stein is a vineyard in the German wine region of Franconia that has been producing a style of wine, known as Steinwein since at least the 8th century. Located on a hill overlooking the Main river outside the city of Würzburg, the vineyard is responsible for what may have been the oldest wine ever tasted. In addition to being one of Germany's oldest winemaking sites, at 85 hectares (210 acres), the vineyard is also one of Germany's largest individual plots.

Today the vineyard is one of the warmest sites in the Franconia wine region and is planted primarily to Riesling and Silvaner.

== History ==
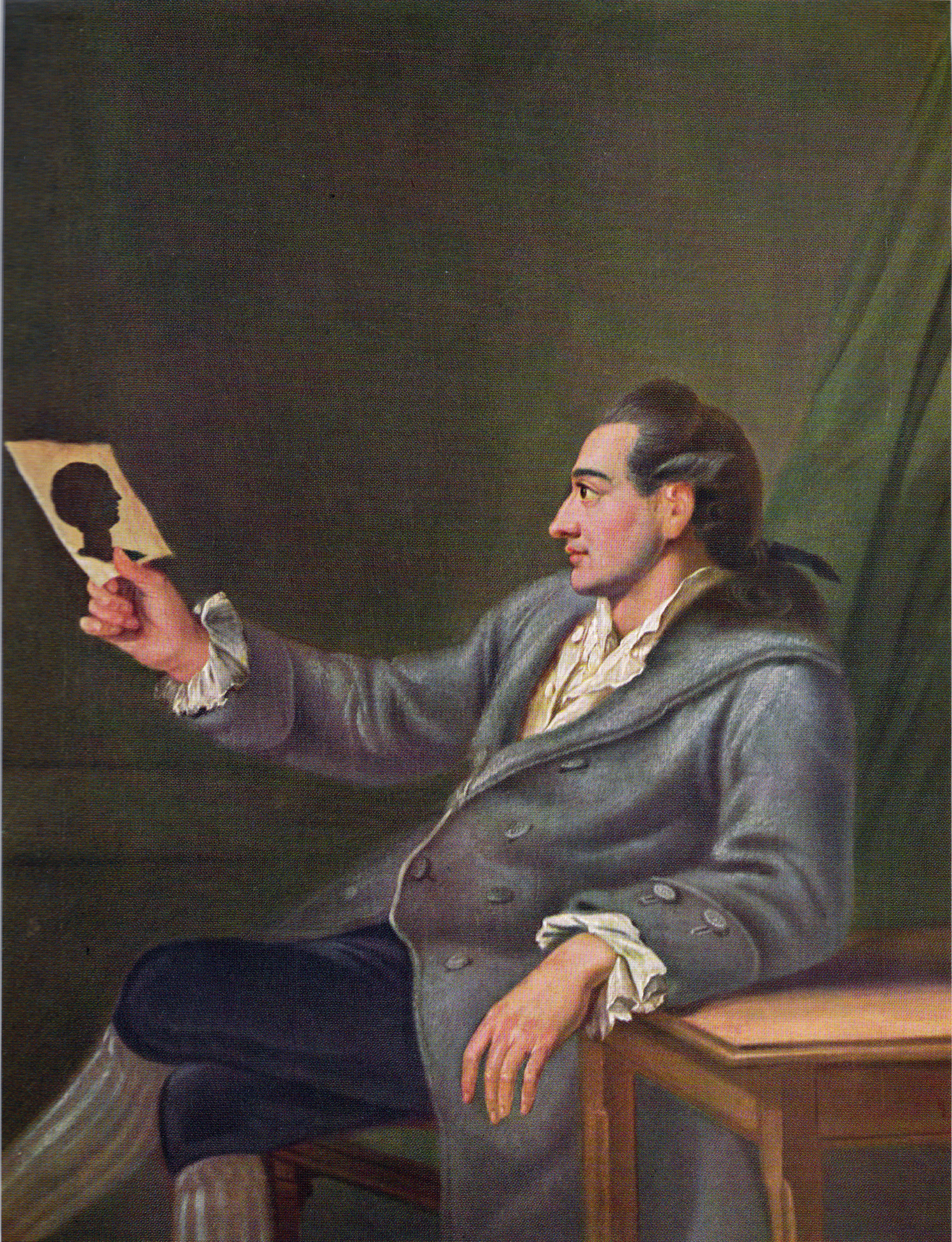
The German writer Johann Wolfgang von Goethe praised the quality of the Steinwein from Würzburger Stein and considered it one of his favorites.

The history of viticulture at Würzburger Stein dates back to at least 779 making it one of Germany's oldest vineyard sites. It is possible that viticulture was taking place earlier here as the Irish missionary Saint Kilian in the 7th century was believed to have helped spread wine growing in the Franconia region and is today considered to be the patron saint of wine growers in the area. Records from 1665 indicate that a Cistercian abbot planted the first Silvaner vines at the site, making it one of the oldest such planting of the grape variety in Germany.

While some production still took place, viticulture on Würzburger Stein declined—as it did in most of Franconia—from the 16th to 19th century as a combination of frequent wars, vineyard pests (such as the phylloxera epidemic) and growing public taste for tea and coffee took its toll on the wine market.

Throughout history, the vineyard and the Steinwein produced here have been noted in various texts and literary work. The German poet Johann Wolfgang von Goethe, in particular, described the wine as one of his favorites and wrote many lines praising its quality. In the 1840s the vineyard was visited by French wine writer André Jullien who described the sweet Steinwein from Würzburger Stein as being very potent and liable to cause violent headaches if too much was consumed. Jullien went on to describe that the strength and sweetness of the wines from Würzburger weren't necessarily the result of late harvest picking but rather from the post-harvest practice of drying the grapes out on mats prior to fermentation—making them essentially vins de paille or straw wines.

Steinwein also featured prominently in writer/journalist Kurt Tucholsky's description of a trip to the Spessart published in 1927 under the title Das Wirtshaus im Spessart.

== 1540 vintage ==
Surviving records from contemporary writers notes that the 1540 vintage in Germany was unusually hot. According to some reports, an extensive drought plagued the region and coupled with the heat became so hot that the Rhine river dried up and people could cross the river bed by foot. The heat contributed to an abundant harvest with grapes of exceedingly high ripeness levels and even some reports of the vines not going dormant in the late fall and producing a secondary harvest.

As was tradition in many German wine regions to celebrate notable vintages, several large ceremonial casks were filled with wines from the 1540 vintage. A cask of Steinwein from the Würzburger Stein vineyard was kept by the Prince-Bishop of Würzburg, being regularly "topped" up with newer wine of a similar quality in order to avoid oxidation from the evaporation of what is known as the "angel's share". The wine was then bottled in the late 17th century. After bottling several bottles were kept in the cellar of King Ludwig I of Bavaria before eventually finding their way to a London wine merchant in the 20th century.

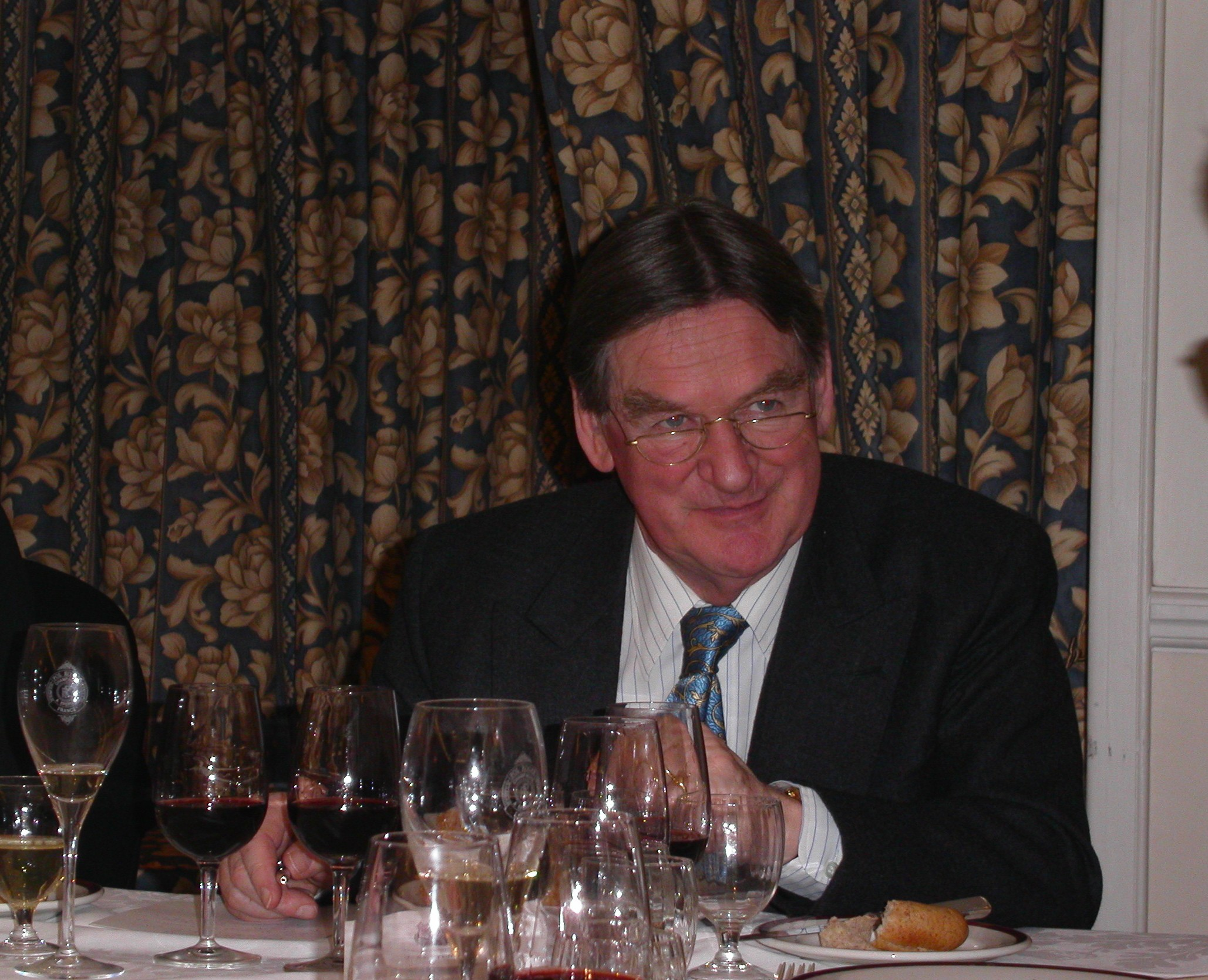
Wine writer Hugh Johnson

A bottle from this 1540 vintage was tried by several wine experts, including wine writer Hugh Johnson, at a 1961 tasting in London when it was 421 years of age, making it one of the oldest wines to have ever been tasted. In his book, Vintage: The Story of Wine (1989), Johnson recounts that the Steinwein was "Madeira-like" with deep brown coloring and was almost like a "living organism" in how it survived so long and still gave evidence of the German terroir of the vineyard. The wine apparently lasted only a few moments after opening before it was quickly oxidized, noted Johnson, "It gave up the ghost and became vinegar in our glasses."

An unopened bottle from the 1540 vintage, making it at least 485 years old, is still kept today in the cellars of the Bürgerspital zum Heiligen Geist wine estate, a charitable foundation based in Würzburg.

=== Claim of being the "oldest wine" ever tasted ===
Despite the authentication of the wine originating with the 1540 vintage, some experts dispute the claims that this was oldest wine ever tasted due to more than a century of having "newer" wine being used to top up the barrel—making it almost similar to a solera style wine that contains partial amounts of several vintages. Other contenders for the title of "oldest wine ever tasted" include a 1646 bottle of Tokay that Australian wine expert James Halliday tasted with fellow writer Len Evans in the early 1970s when it was over 324 years old. Another bottle of wine from the 1646 vintage was sold for $700 in a 1984 wine auction in Geneva to a collector from Princeton, New Jersey when the wine was at least 338 years old though there are no details on when that bottle was consumed.

Several other contender whose dates of consumption are difficult to prove are 328 bottles of Tokay from the 1606 vintage that a Warsaw wine merchant had cataloged in his inventory before the start of World War II when the wine was 333 years old. From the 1939 Invasion of Poland by the Nazi Army to the subsequent Soviet invasion of Poland and Warsaw Uprising in 1944, all 328 bottles that were first catalogued had disappeared—either drunk, broken or looted.

== Vineyard ==
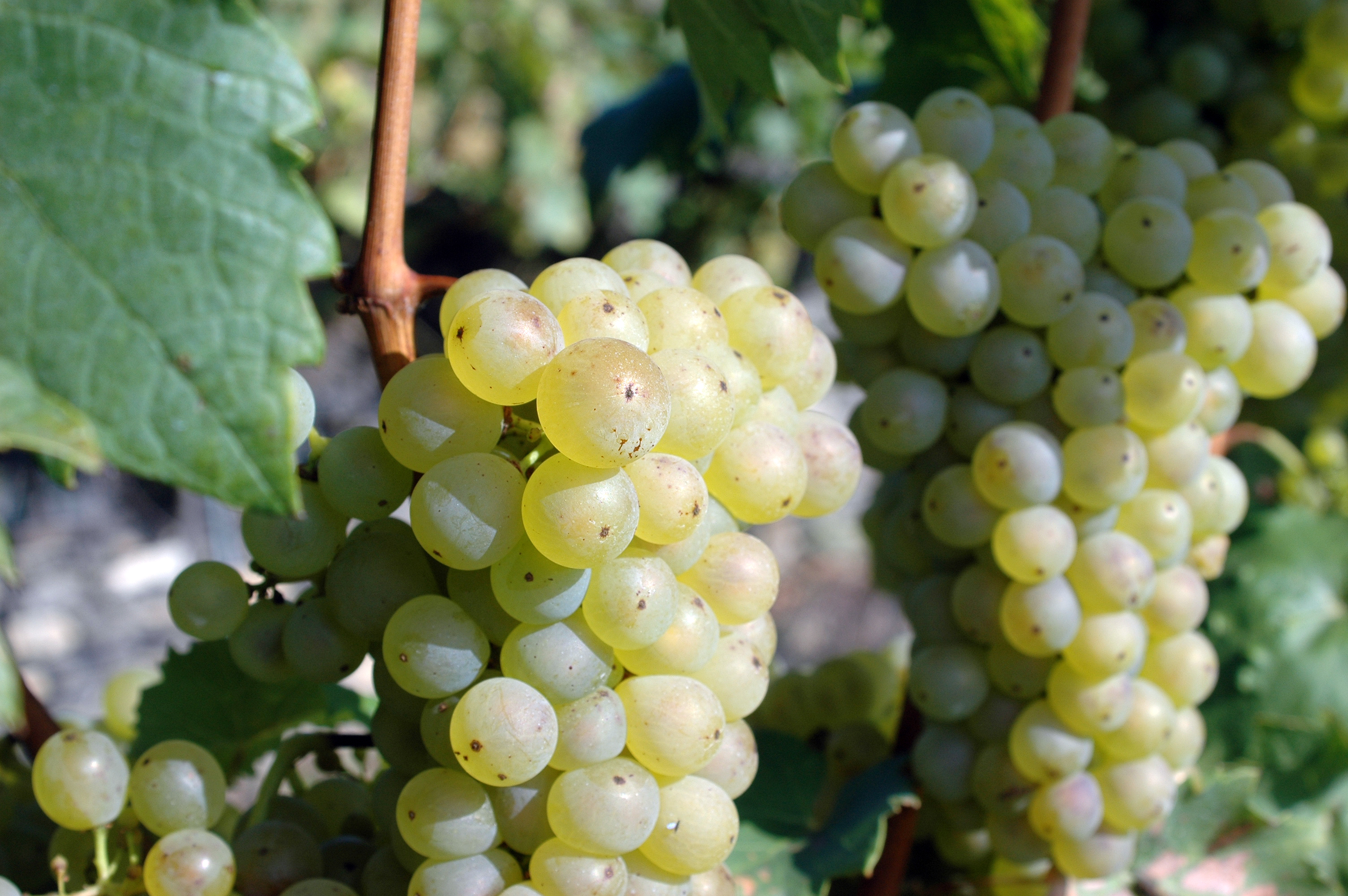
Riesling grapes

The word "stein" in German means "stone" and refers to the rocky limestone soil of the vineyard located on a hillside outside of the city of Würzburg that overlooks the Main river. The concave shape of the hill and steep incline of the slope give the vines ideal exposure that, coupled with the tempering influence of the nearby river, helps the grapes to fully ripen yet maintain the acidity levels needed to balance the sugars. This offers the site some advantages in the continental climate of the Franconia region that is often more prone to frost damage than vineyards in other German wine regions like Rheingau and Mosel.

== Grapes and wines ==
The two primary grapes of Würzburger Stein are Riesling and Silvaner. As one of the warmest vineyards sites in Franconia, Würzburger Stein is one of the few vineyards in the region where Riesling is widely grown. The Rieslings from the vineyard are described as having "piquant" acidity that balances the fruitiness of the grape and helps contribute to a characteristic long finish that wines from this vineyard tend to exhibit. The Silvaners tend to be full-bodied and highly aromatic.
