= Frickenhausen am Main =

- Municipality
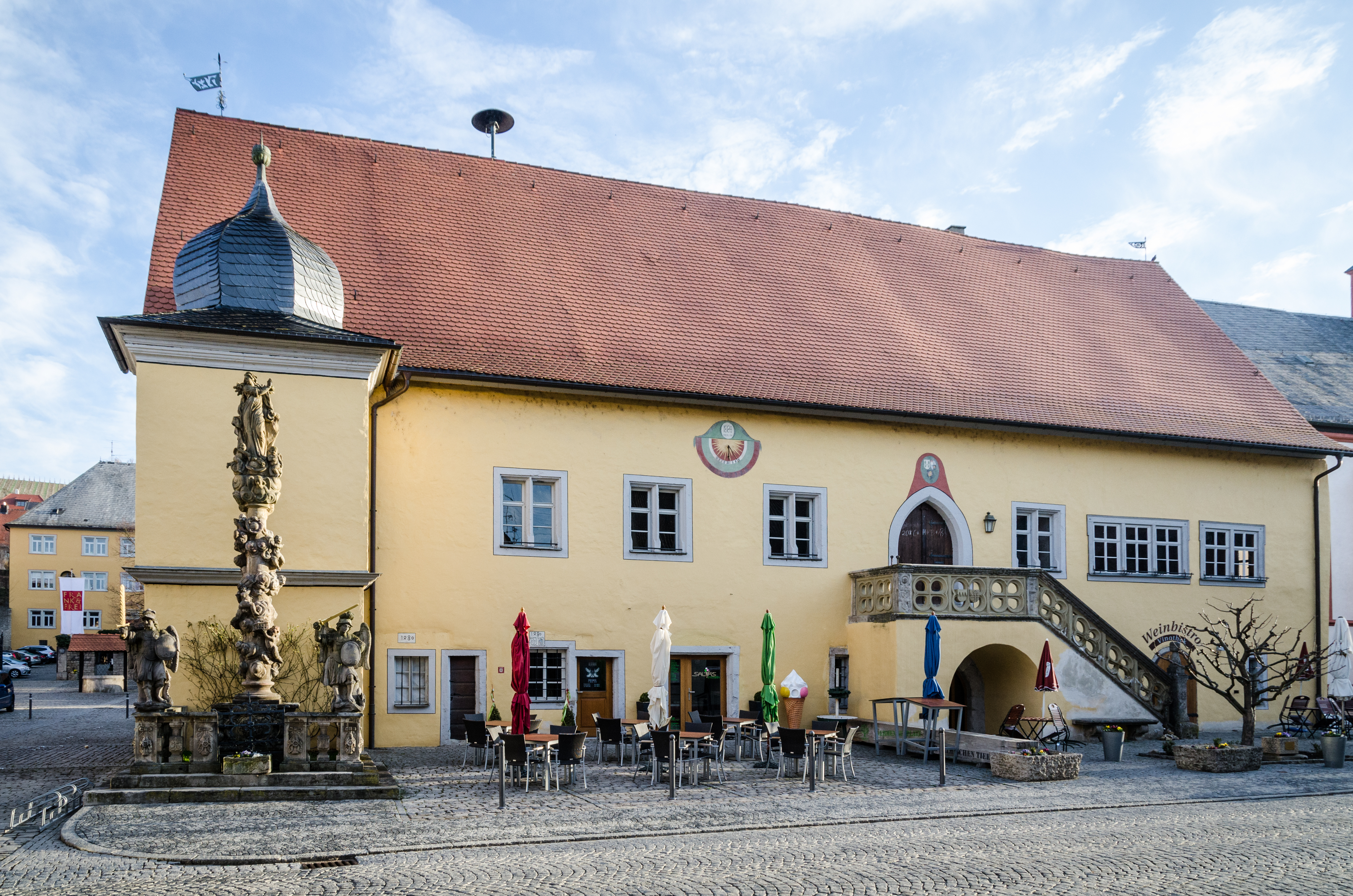
- Town hall

- Coat of arms

- Location of Frickenhausen am Main within Würzburg district
- Interactive map of Frickenhausen am Main
- Location within Germany Location within Bavaria
- Coordinates: 49°40′N 10°5′E
- Country: Germany
- State: Bavaria
- Admin. region: Unterfranken
- District: Würzburg
- Municipal assoc.: Eibelstadt

Government
  - Mayor (2020–26): Günther Hofmann

Area
  - Total: 10.54 km^{2} (4.07 sq mi)
- Elevation: 180 m (590 ft)

Population (2025-12-31)
  - Total: 1,194
  - Density: 113.3/km^{2} (293.4/sq mi)
- Time zone: UTC+01:00 (CET)
  - Summer (DST): UTC+02:00 (CEST)
- Postal codes: 97252
- Dialling codes: 09331
- Vehicle registration: WÜ
- Website: www.frickenhausen-main.de

Frickenhausen am Main is a municipality in the district of Würzburg in Bavaria, Germany. It lies on the river Main. Frickenhausen is one of the oldest towns of Mainfranken.

== Notable residents ==
- Adam Grünewald (1902–1945), German SS officer and Nazi concentration camp commandant
