= Sommerhausen =

- Municipality
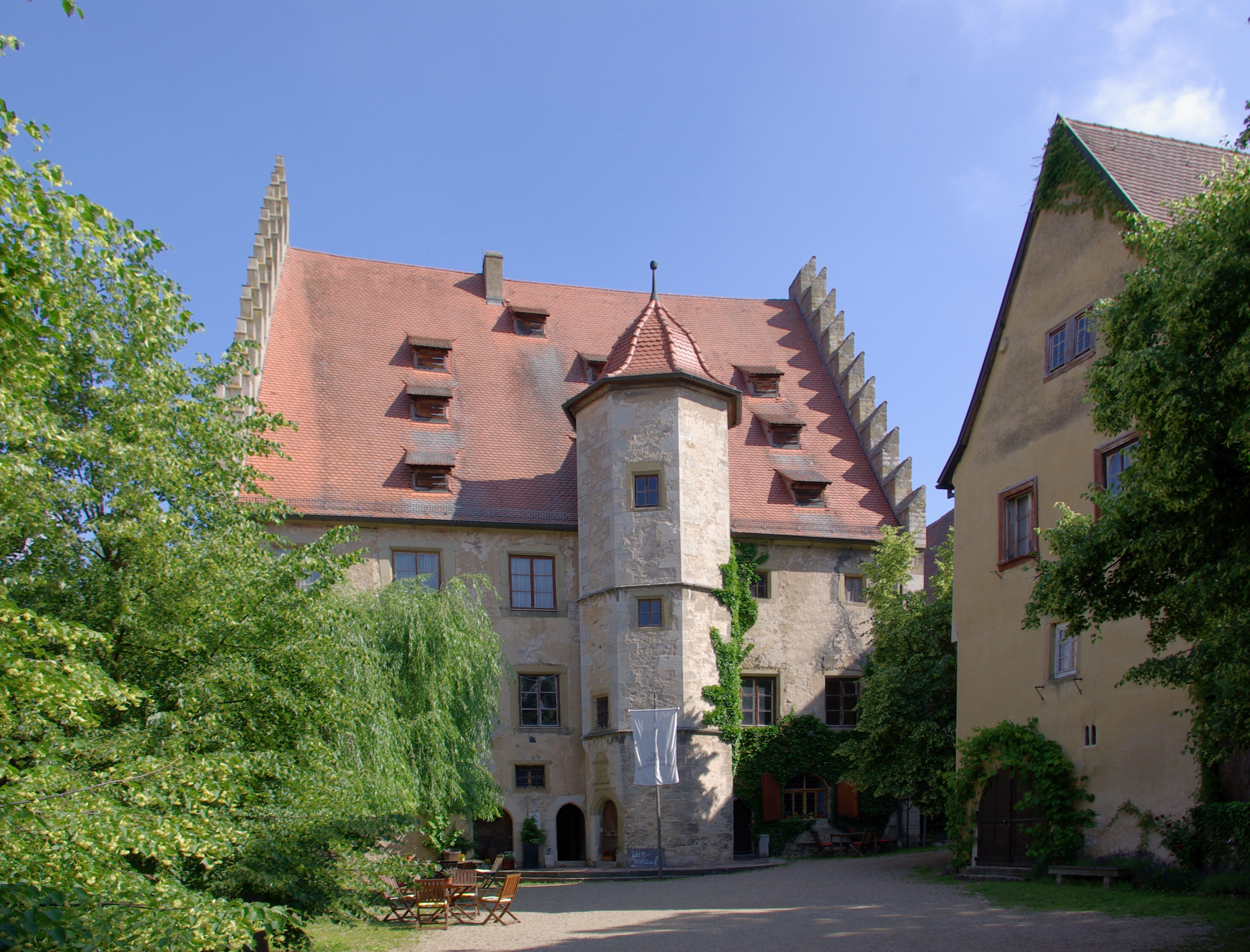
- Castle in Sommerhausen

- Coat of arms

- Location of Sommerhausen within Würzburg district
- Interactive map of Sommerhausen
- Location within Germany Location within Bavaria
- Coordinates: 49°42′N 10°02′E
- Country: Germany
- State: Bavaria
- Admin. region: Unterfranken
- District: Würzburg
- Municipal assoc.: Eibelstadt

Government
  - Mayor (2020–26): Wilfried Saak

Area
  - Total: 7.22 km^{2} (2.79 sq mi)
- Elevation: 181 m (594 ft)

Population (2025-12-31)
  - Total: 1,889
  - Density: 262/km^{2} (678/sq mi)
- Time zone: UTC+01:00 (CET)
  - Summer (DST): UTC+02:00 (CEST)
- Postal codes: 97286
- Dialling codes: 09333
- Vehicle registration: WÜ
- Website: www.sommerhausen.de

Sommerhausen is a municipality and market town in the district of Würzburg in Bavaria, Germany.

== History ==
Sommerhausen has been an important town on the Main since the Middle Ages. It did not belong to the prince-bishop of Würzburg; as part of the lordship of Speckfeld, it belonged to the Counts Schenk of Limpurg from 1413 onward. In 1500 Sommerhausen became part of the Frankish Imperial Circle. The inhabitants became Lutheran Protestants when the Reformation was introduced in all Limpurgish possessions in 1540. As result, even today, Sommerhausen is a Protestant enclave in the predominantly Catholic Mainfranken region. The lordship was mediated into the new Grand Duchy of Würzburg in 1810, the whole of which was incorporated into Bavaria soon after, in 1814. In the course of the administrative reforms in Bavaria, the municipal edict of 1818 created the present municipality.

The town, nestled among the vineyards of the Main valley, is a flagship example of the romanticism associated with Franconia. The medieval city wall has been preserved. The historic buildings lining the narrow, contorted streets and alleys of the town center look back on several hundred years of history. The town hall dates from the 16th century.
