= Ipsheim =

- Municipality
- Coat of arms

- Location of Ipsheim within Neustadt a.d.Aisch-Bad Windsheim district
- Interactive map of Ipsheim
- Location within Germany Location within Bavaria
- Coordinates: 49°31′N 10°28′E
- Country: Germany
- State: Bavaria
- Admin. region: Mittelfranken
- District: Neustadt a.d.Aisch-Bad Windsheim

Government
  - Mayor (2020–26): Stefan Schmidt

Area
  - Total: 42.27 km^{2} (16.32 sq mi)
- Elevation: 304 m (997 ft)

Population (2025-12-31)
  - Total: 2,159
  - Density: 51.08/km^{2} (132.3/sq mi)
- Time zone: UTC+01:00 (CET)
  - Summer (DST): UTC+02:00 (CEST)
- Postal codes: 91472
- Dialling codes: 09846
- Vehicle registration: NEA
- Website: www.ipsheim.de

Ipsheim is a municipality in the district of Neustadt (Aisch)-Bad Windsheim in Bavaria in Germany.

St. Michael is a chapel on a hill near Kaubenheim which is part of it.

Elia Levita, author of the Bovo-Bukh (written 1507–1508), the most popular chivalric romance written in Yiddish, was born here.

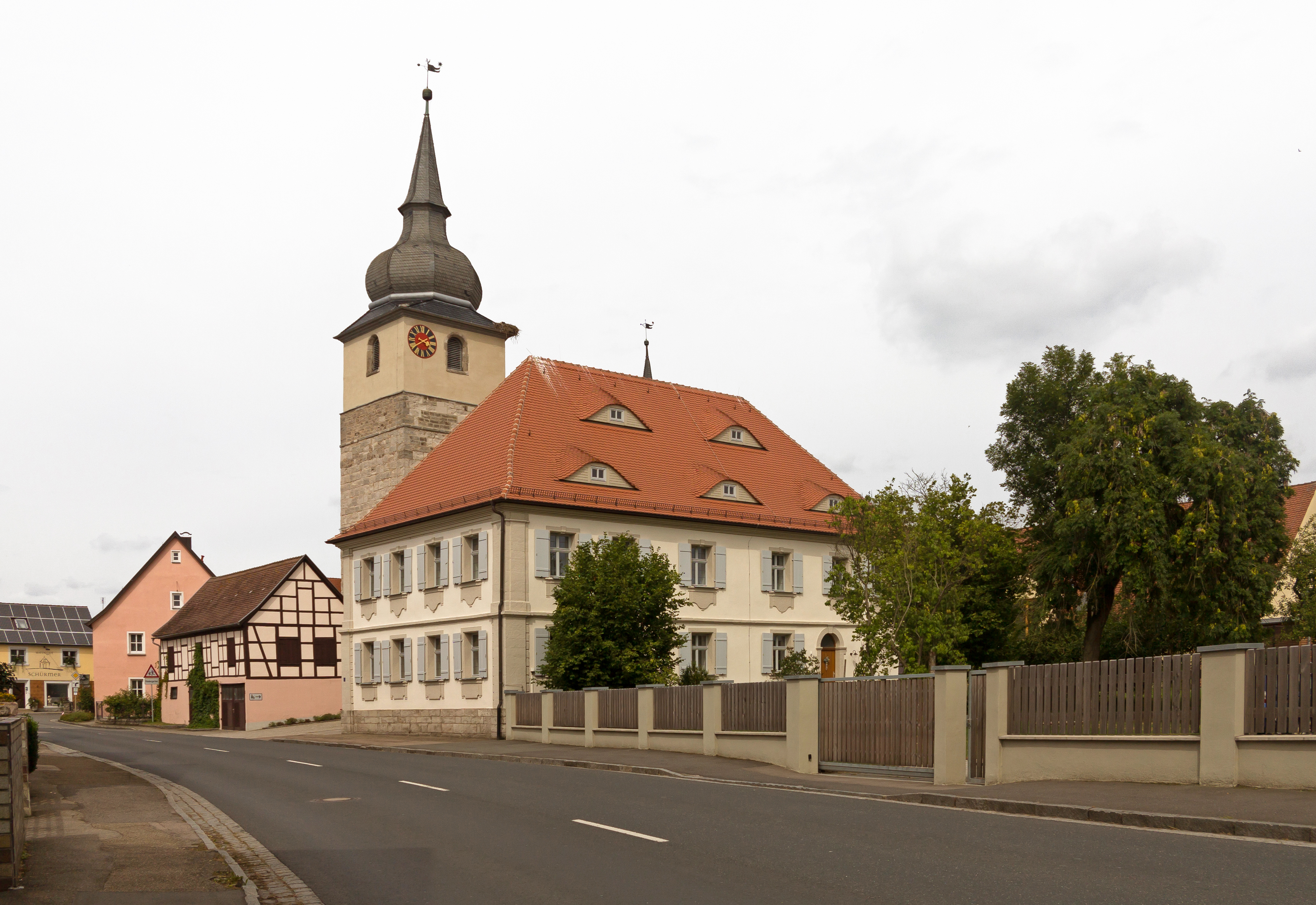
Ipsheim, pastor house

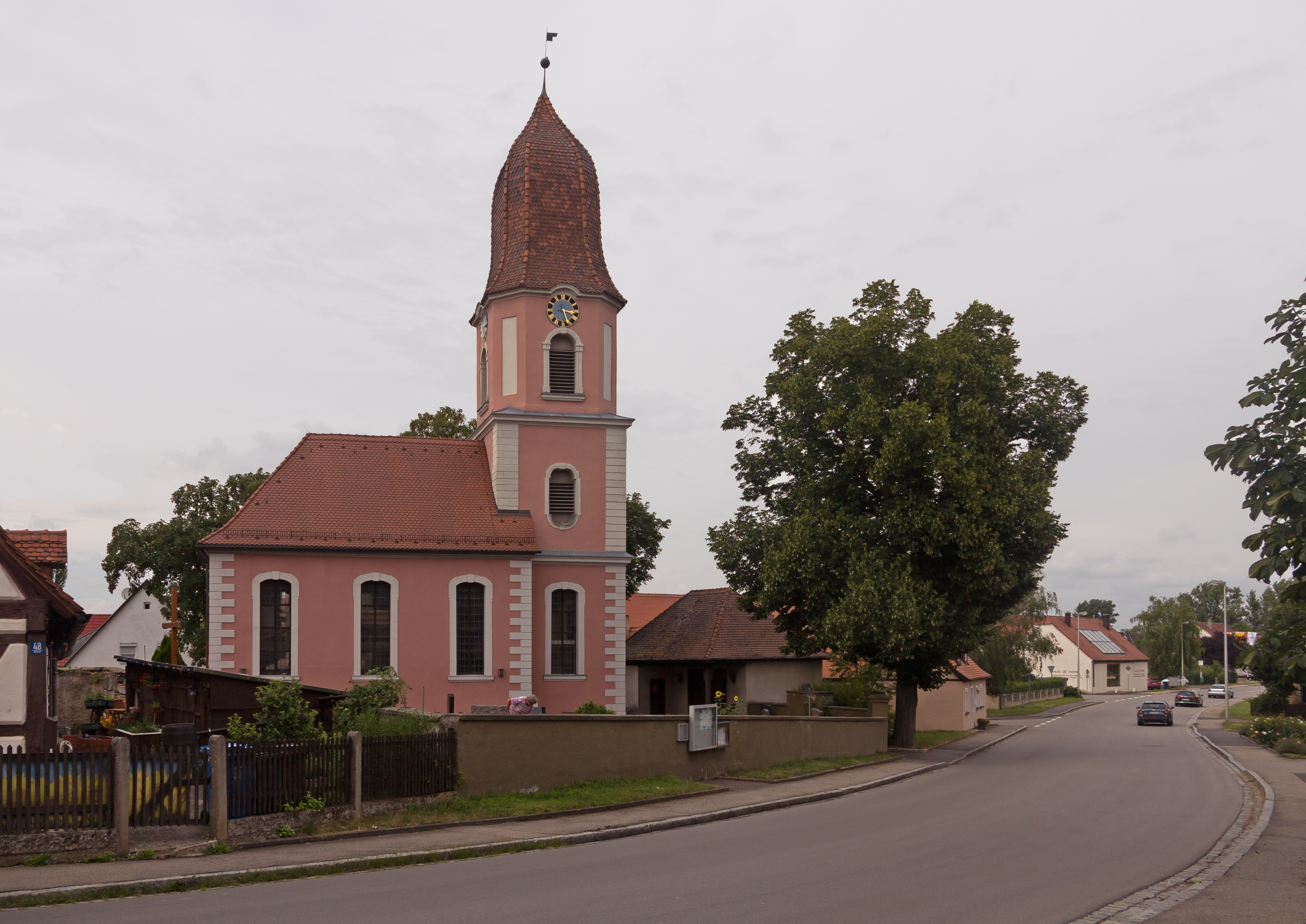
Oberndorf, reformed church: Kirche Sankt Kilian
