= Randersacker =

- Municipality
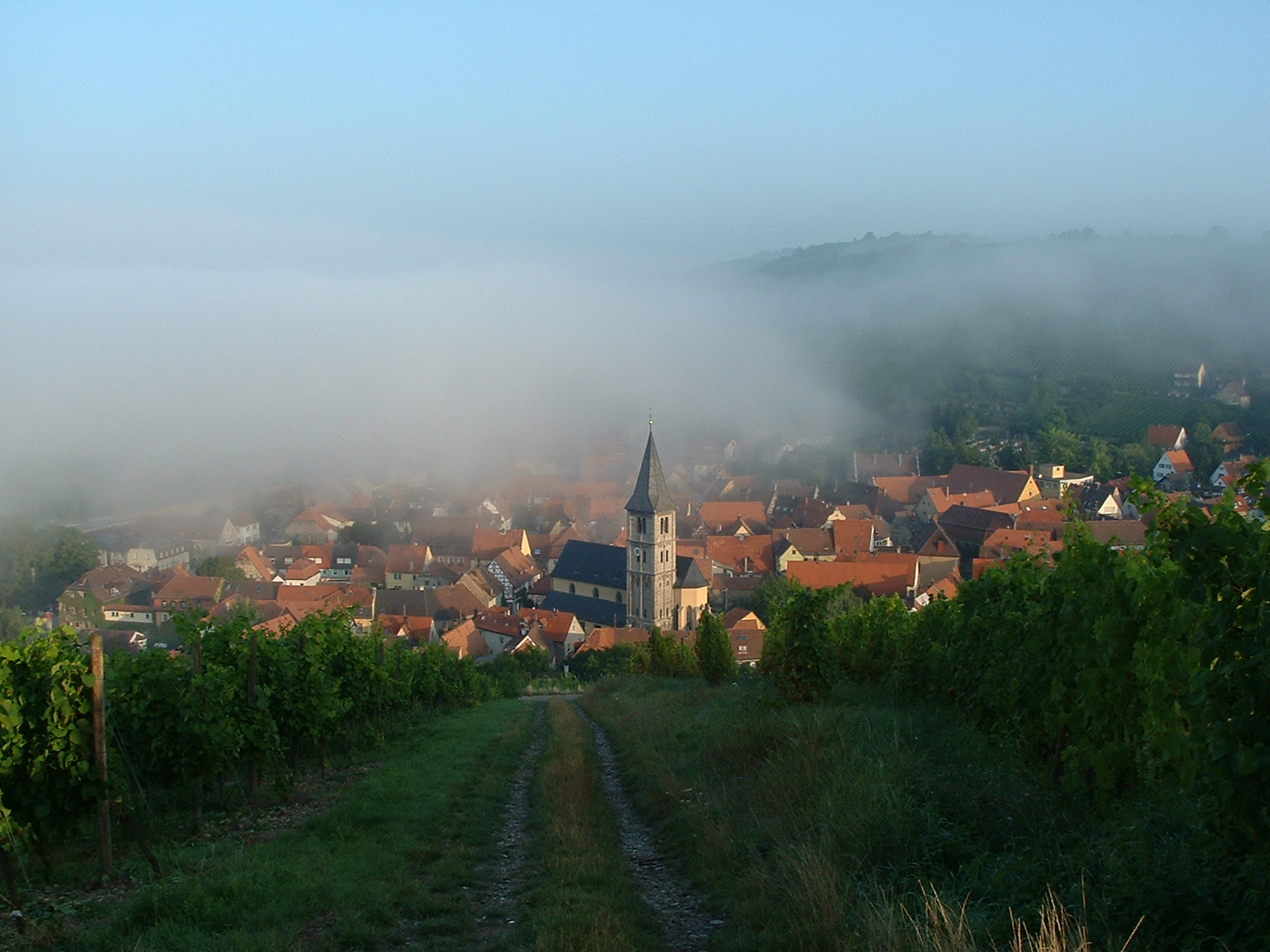
- Randersacker on a foggy summer morning

- Coat of arms

- Location of Randersacker within Würzburg district
- Interactive map of Randersacker
- Location within Germany Location within Bavaria
- Coordinates: 49°45′32″N 09°58′58″E
- Country: Germany
- State: Bavaria
- Admin. region: Lower Franconia
- District: Würzburg

Government
  - Mayor (2023–29): Michael Sedelmayer

Area
  - Total: 16.20 km^{2} (6.25 sq mi)
- Elevation: 172–280 m (564–919 ft)

Population (2025-12-31)
  - Total: 3,356
  - Density: 207.2/km^{2} (536.5/sq mi)
- Time zone: UTC+01:00 (CET)
  - Summer (DST): UTC+02:00 (CEST)
- Postal codes: 97236
- Dialling codes: 0931
- Vehicle registration: WÜ
- Website: www.randersacker.de

Randersacker is a market town and municipality in Lower Franconia, a part of Bavaria, Germany. With its long tradition in wine making, Randersacker is a well-known wine places of Germany. It lies in the Würzburg district, and adjoins to Würzburg boroughs Heidingsfeld, Rottenbauer, Sanderau and Frauenland and to the municipalities of Gerbrunn, Theilheim and Eibelstadt.

== Geography ==
Randersacker is located south of Würzburg. This part of the Main is called Maindreieck. The term refers to the course of the river; it looks similar to a triangle. The city of Würzburg is about three miles from the village center of Randersacker.

There are two subdistricts: Lindelbach and the main part, Randersacker.

== Geology ==
The ground of Randersacker consists of shell-bearing limestone. Until the middle of the 20th century, the region was a centre of the quarry industry. There are still remains on top of some hills. An important historic monument is the museum quarry near Lindelbach with a well-preserved crane.

== History ==
The first written mention of a settlement at the location of Randersacker was in 779. It was the Würzburger Markbeschreibung (report of the Würzburg area). It reports that there were some vineyards on this land.

The first mention of Randersacker was in 1123.

=== Population ===
- 1970 – 3,378
- 1987 – 3,507
- 2000 – 3,513
- 2009 – 3,435

== Economy ==
The most important industries in Randersacker are viticulture and tourism. There are about 17 winemakers and several restaurants and hotels. Weingut Schmitt’s Kinder is a member of the Verband Deutscher Prädikatsweingüter (VDP).

== Traffic ==
The Autobahn A3 passes Randersacker 2 kilometres south of the village centre. Also the river Main is a transport route of national importance.

== Main sights ==
The Balthasar Neumann Pavilion is a pavilion designed and built by the famous architect Johann Balthasar Neumann about 1750. It is his smallest building and is completely preserved. Today the pavilion serves for representation purposes, weddings etc.

The church Sankt Stephanus is one of the most beautiful romanesque churches in Franconia. The steeple is about 30 metres (98 ft) high and was built in the 13th and 14th century.

The Zehnthof is an old manor in Randersacker.
