= Franconian Wine Queen =

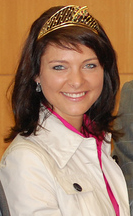
Marlies Dumbsky, 2008/09 Franconian Wine Queen

The Franconian Wine Queen (German: Fränkische Weinkönigin) is the annually-elected representative of the German wine region of Franconia. At the end of her time in office, she is eligible to participate in the competition for the German Wine Queen. Until 1963, the Franconian Wine Queen reigned for two years.

== Selection process ==
The candidates should come from a vintner's family and be at least 18 years old. The Franconian Wine Queen is chosen by a panel of judges. She represents Franconian wine for a period of twelve months, both at home and abroad. The 57th Franconian Wine Queen (2012/13) was nominated in January 2012 as Melanie Dietrich from Fahr.

After a year in office, the Franconian Wine Queen, together with the other twelve regional wine queens in Germany, takes part in the competition for the German Wine Queen. In 2008, the Franconian Wine Queen, Marlies Dumbsky from Volkach, was chosen as the 60th German Wine Queen for one year (until 2009).

== Franconian Wine Queens ==
(incomplete list)

- 1950/1951 Tilly Lurz, Randersacker
- 1951-1953 Marianne Spenkuch, Wiesenbronn
- 1953-1955 Doris Bausenwein, Iphofen
- 1955-1957 Hedwig Raps, Volkach
- 1957 Karoline Baumgärtner, Rödelsee (German Wine Queen)
- 1957-1959 Rosemarie Stolzenberger, Klingenberg am Main (German Wine Queen)
- 1959-1961 Maria Brombierstäudl, Iphofen
- 1961-1963 Irene Krauss, Obereisenheim
- 1963/1964 Marita Bäuerlein, Volkach (Deutsche Weinkönigin)
- 1964/1965 Christa Navratil, Nordheim am Main
- 1965/1966 Christa Karl, Volkach
- 1966/1967 Christa Boll, Escherndorf
- 1967/1968 Brigitte Fleder, Veitshöchheim (German Wine Queen)
- 1969/1970 Christa Horn, Iphofen
- 1970/1971 Heide-Marie Greiner-Römmert, Volkach
- 1971/1972 Marlene Schäffer, Thüngersheim
- 1972/1973 Christl Finger, Randersacker
- 1973/1974 Renate Loichinger, Großheubach
- 1974/1975 Gertraud Schubert, Obereisenheim
- 1975/1976 Carmen Stumpf, Frickenhausen am Main
- 1976/1977 Irmtraud Zimmermann, Retzstadt
- 1977/1978 Monika Lindner, Volkach-Escherndorf
- 1978/1979 Helga Sauer, Obereisenheim
- 1979/1980 Barbara Schiebel, Untereisenheim
- 1980/1981 Irmgard Gündert, Sommerach
- 1981/1982 Anita Krämer-Gerhard, Astheim (German Wine Queen)
- 1982/1983 Karin Molitor-Hartmann, Sommerach (German Wine Queen 1982/1983)
- 1983/1984 Andrea Wägerle, Obereisenheim
- 1984/1985 Irene Säger, Zeilitzheim
- 1985/1986 Monika Kirch, Nordheim am Main
- 1986/1987 Christl Büttner, Thüngersheim
- 1987/1988 Petra Ungemach, Nordheim am Main
- 1988/1989 Doris Paul, Wiesenbronn
- 1989/1990 Renate Schäfer, Volkach-Astheim (German Wine Queen 1989/1990)
- 1990/1991 Karin Rickel, Großlangheim
- 1991/1992 Heidrun Kaufmann, Erlenbach bei Marktheidenfeld
- 1992/1993 Andrea Schröder geb. Hütten, Randersacker
- 1993/1994 Victoria Hessdörfer, Retzbach
- 1994/1995 Tanja Elflein, Obereisenheim
- 1995/1996 Daniela Soth, Erlenbach bei Marktheidenfeld
- 1996/1997 Claudia Schmachtenberger, Eibelstadt
- 1997/1998 Martina Reiss, Ipsheim
- 1998/1999 Michaela Heusinger, Sommerach
- 1999/2000 Sandra Sauer, Volkach-Escherndorf
- 2000/2001 Silvia Gaul, Stetten
- 2001/2002 Iris Stumpf, Erlenbach bei Marktheidenfeld
- 2002/2003 Julia Stühler, Untereisenheim
- 2003/2004 Nicole Then, Sommerach (German Wine Queen)
- 2004/2005 Lisa Schmitt, Großlangheim
- 2005/2006 Eva Steindorf, Volkach-Escherndorf
- 2006/2007 Jennifer Herbert, Zeilitzheim
- 2007/2008 Eva Barthelme, Volkach-Gaibach
- 2008/2009 Marlies Dumbsky, Volkach (German Wine Queen 2008/2009)
- 2009/2010 Anna Saum, Großlangheim
- 2010/2011 Melanie Unsleber, Ramsthal (German Wine Princess)
- 2011/2012 Sabine Ziegler, Güntersleben
- 2012/2013 Melanie Dietrich, Fahr
- 2013/2014 Marion Wunderlich, Tauberrettersheim
- 2014/2015 Christin Ungemach, Nordheim am Main
- 2015/2016 Kristin Langmann, Bullenheim
- 2016/2017 Christina Schneider, Nordheim am Main (German Wine Princess 2016/2017)
- 2017/2018 Silena Werner, Stammheim
- 2018/2019 Klara Zehnder, Randersacker
- 2019/2020 Carolin Meyer, Castell-Greuth
- 2019–2022 Carolin Meyer, Greuth (pandemiebedingt fielen die Wahlen 2020 und 2021 aus)
- 2022–2024 Eva Brockmann, Großwallstadt (German Wine Queen 2023/2024)
- 2024/2025 Lisa Lehritter, Frickenhausen am Main

== Number of winners by place ==
(incomplete list)

Town or village	Year	Number
Astheim	1981, 1989	2
Eibelstadt	1996	1
Erlenbach bei Marktheidenfeld	1991, 1995, 2001	3
Escherndorf	1966, 1977, 1999, 2005	4
Fahr (Volkach)	2012	1
Frickenhausen	1975	1
Volkach - Gaibach	2007	1
Großheubach	1973	1
Großlangheim	1990, 2004, 2009	3
Güntersleben	2011	1
Iphofen	1953, 1959, 1969	3
Ipsheim	1997	1
Klingenberg am Main	1957	1
Nordheim	1964, 1985, 1987, 2014	4
Obereisenheim	1961, 1974, 1978, 1983, 1994	5
Ramsthal	2010	1
Randersacker	1950, 1972, 1992	3
Retzbach	1993	1
Retzstadt	1976	1
Rödelsee	1957	1
Sommerach	1980, 1982, 1998, 2003	4
Stetten	2000	1
Tauberrettersheim	2013	1
Thüngersheim	1971, 1986	2
Untereisenheim	1979, 2002	2
Veitshöchheim	1967	1
Volkach	1955, 1963, 1965, 1968, 1970, 2008	6
Wiesenbronn	1951, 1988	2
Zeilitzheim	1984, 2006	2
