= Marktbreit =

- Town
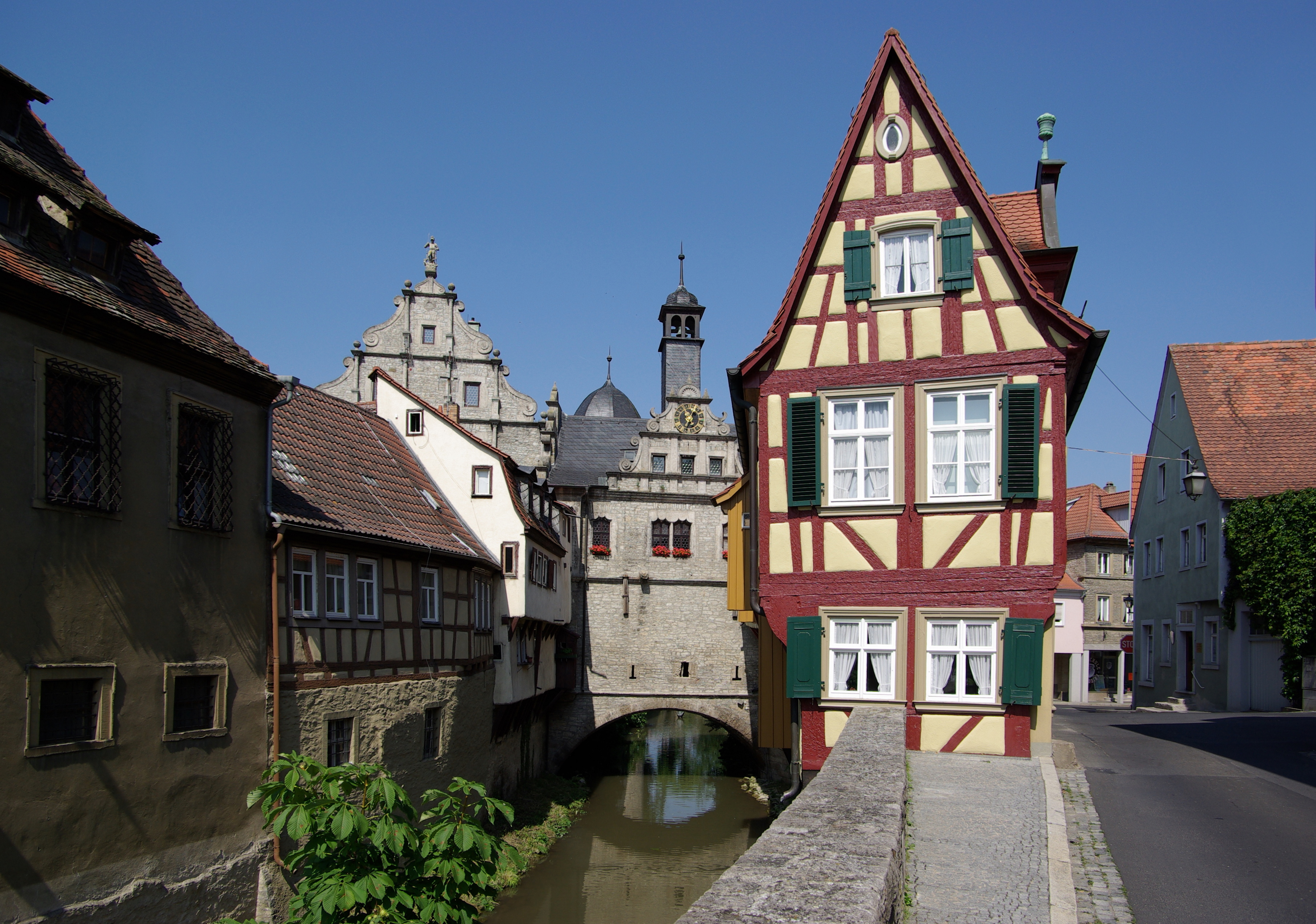
- The Malerwinkel in Marktbreit

- Coat of arms

- Location of Marktbreit within Kitzingen district
- Interactive map of Marktbreit
- Location within Germany Location within Bavaria
- Coordinates: 49°40′1″N 10°8′37″E
- Country: Germany
- State: Bavaria
- Admin. region: Unterfranken
- District: Kitzingen
- Municipal assoc.: Marktbreit

Government
  - Mayor (2020–26): Harald Kopp (SPD)

Area
  - Total: 20.16 km^{2} (7.78 sq mi)
- Elevation: 191 m (627 ft)

Population (2025-12-31)
  - Total: 3,764
  - Density: 186.7/km^{2} (483.6/sq mi)
- Time zone: UTC+01:00 (CET)
  - Summer (DST): UTC+02:00 (CEST)
- Postal codes: 97338–97340
- Dialling codes: 09332
- Vehicle registration: KT
- Website: www.marktbreit.de

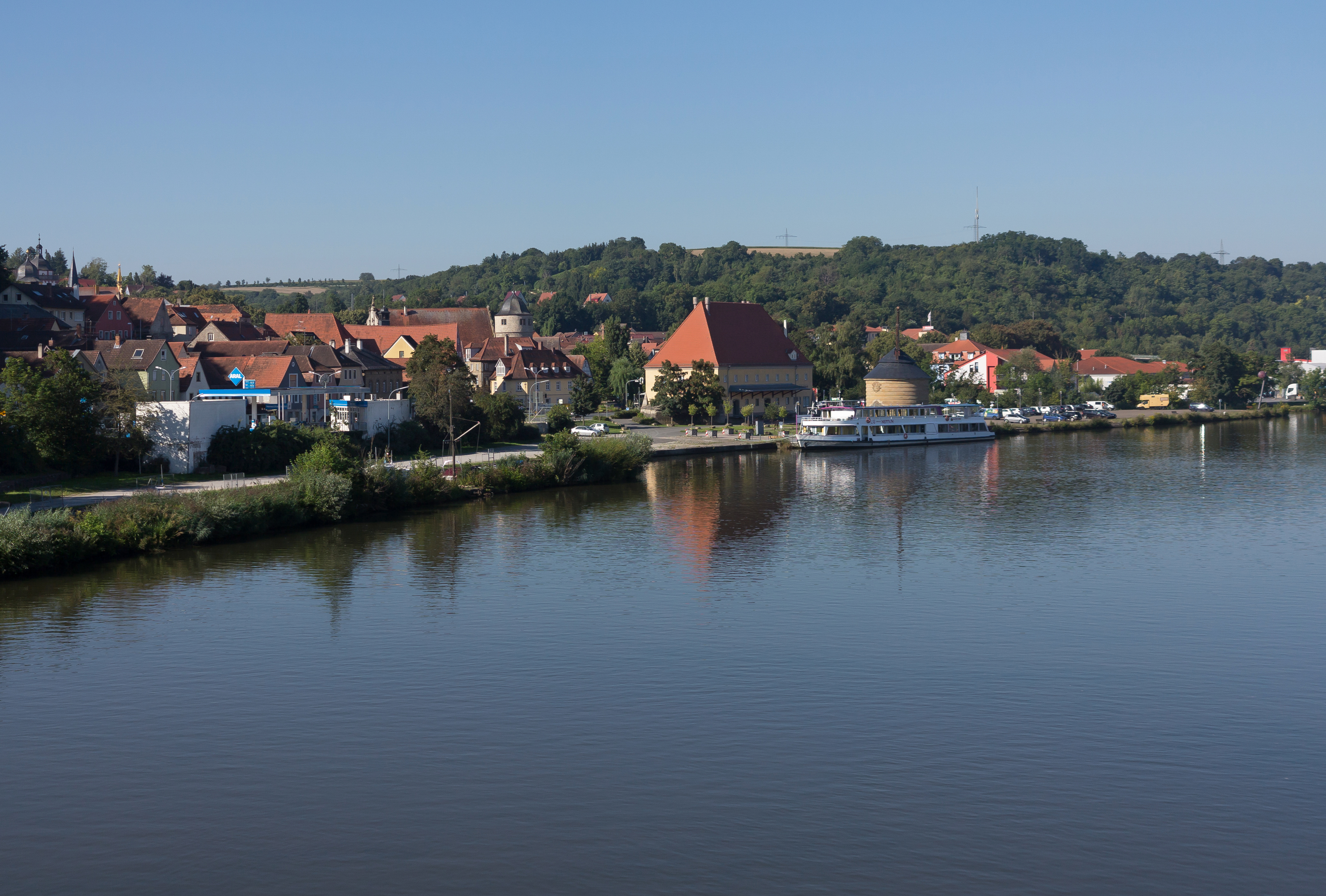
Marktbreit, view to the town from Segnitz

Marktbreit am Main (German pronunciation: [maʁktˈbʁaɪt]) is a town in the district of Kitzingen in the Regierungsbezirk Unterfranken in Bavaria, Germany. It is situated at the most southern point of the Main river. Marktbreit is the birthplace of Alois Alzheimer who first identified the symptoms of what is now known as Alzheimer's disease. With its suburb Gnodstadt, Marktbreit has around 3,700 inhabitants.

== Geography ==
=== Location ===
The town of Marktbreit is located in the district of Kitzingen, in the Lower Franconia region of Bavaria. Its territory lies on the left bank of the Main river, at the river's southernmost bend. The town of Kitzingen lies upriver, while downriver are Ochsenfurt and Würzburg.

Marktbreit is located on the southwestern edge of the district, where it borders on the districts of Neustadt (Aisch)-Bad Windsheim and Würzburg.

=== Subdivisions ===
The town has two Stadtteile: Marktbreit and Gnodstadt.

=== Neighbouring municipalities ===
The municipality borders on (from the north clockwise): Marktsteft, Obernbreit, Martinsheim, Oberickelsheim, Ochsenfurt, Frickenhausen am Main and Segnitz.

== History ==
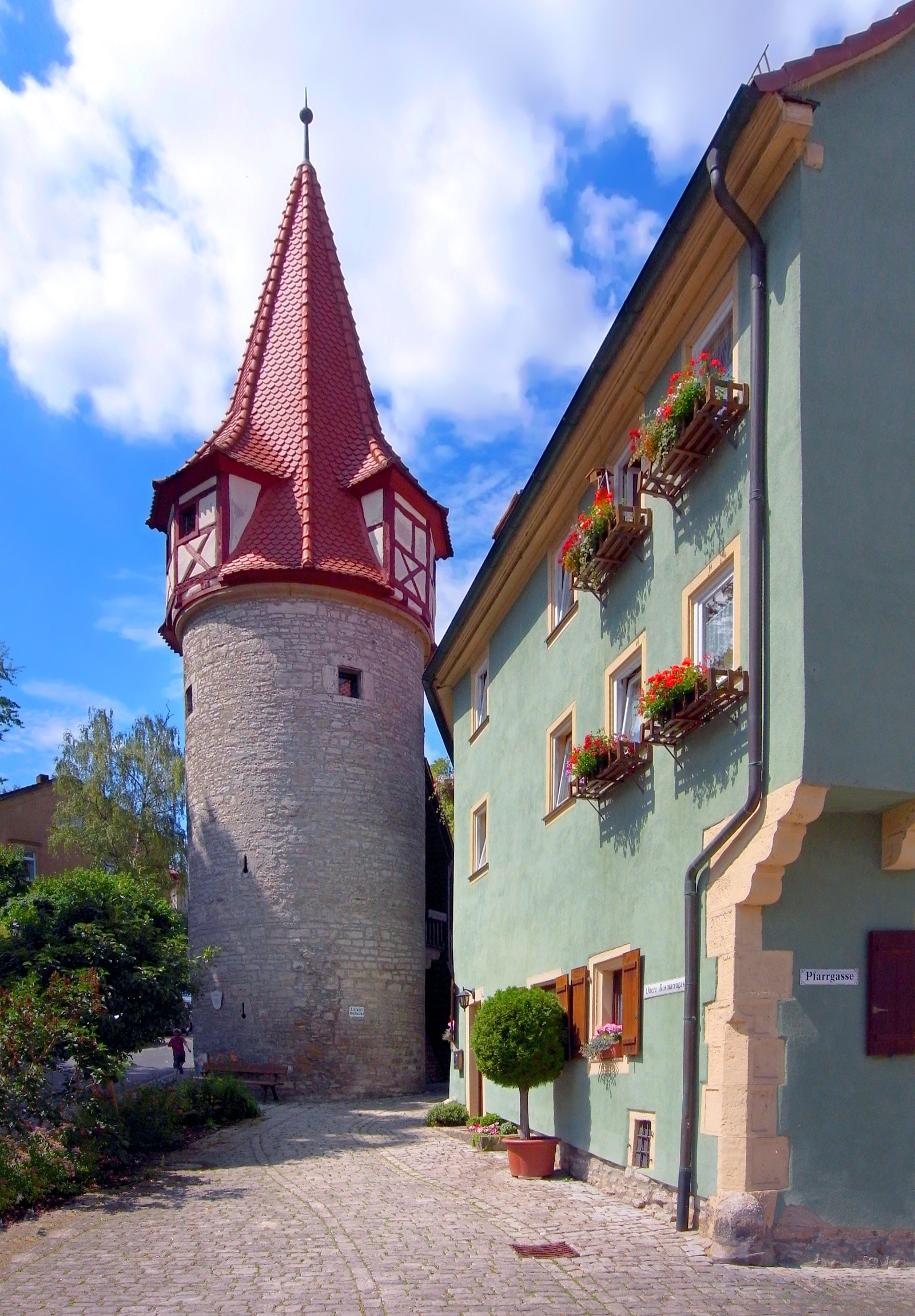
The town wall tower Flurersturm

=== Roman settlement ===
Near Markbreit, the site of a large Roman legionary fortress (or castrum legionarium) known locally as the Römerlager Marktbreit, was discovered in 1985 and celebrated as a minor scientific sensation because it was never suspected that a legionary fortress was built so far northeast in enemy territory. It was built in Augustan times in enemy territory beyond the "Limes" frontier in preparation for an invasion of the rest of Germany.

It was identified on aerial photos in 1985, and archaeologists were active in 1986-1992. The palisade (2¼ km long, using 21,000 trees) appeared to be finished and several buildings were complete. The surface area of 37 ha suggested that the base was built for two legions or one legion and many auxiliary troops. There were no traces of actual occupation and it took some time to conclude that this was not the result of erosion, but from the fact that the base had been prepared but was never used.

The headquarters (praetorium), the residences of three centurions, store rooms (horrea), and kilns had already been finished before the settlement was abandoned. There are no traces of violence, and precious objects appear to have been taken away, which suggests that the Marktbreit castrum was evacuated when strategic realities had changed and made it unnecessary.

However, a rebellion in Pannonia delayed the execution of the invasion plan, and the defeat of Varus in the Teutoburg Forest put an end to all Roman ambitions east of the Rhine, and the base was never used.

=== Later history ===
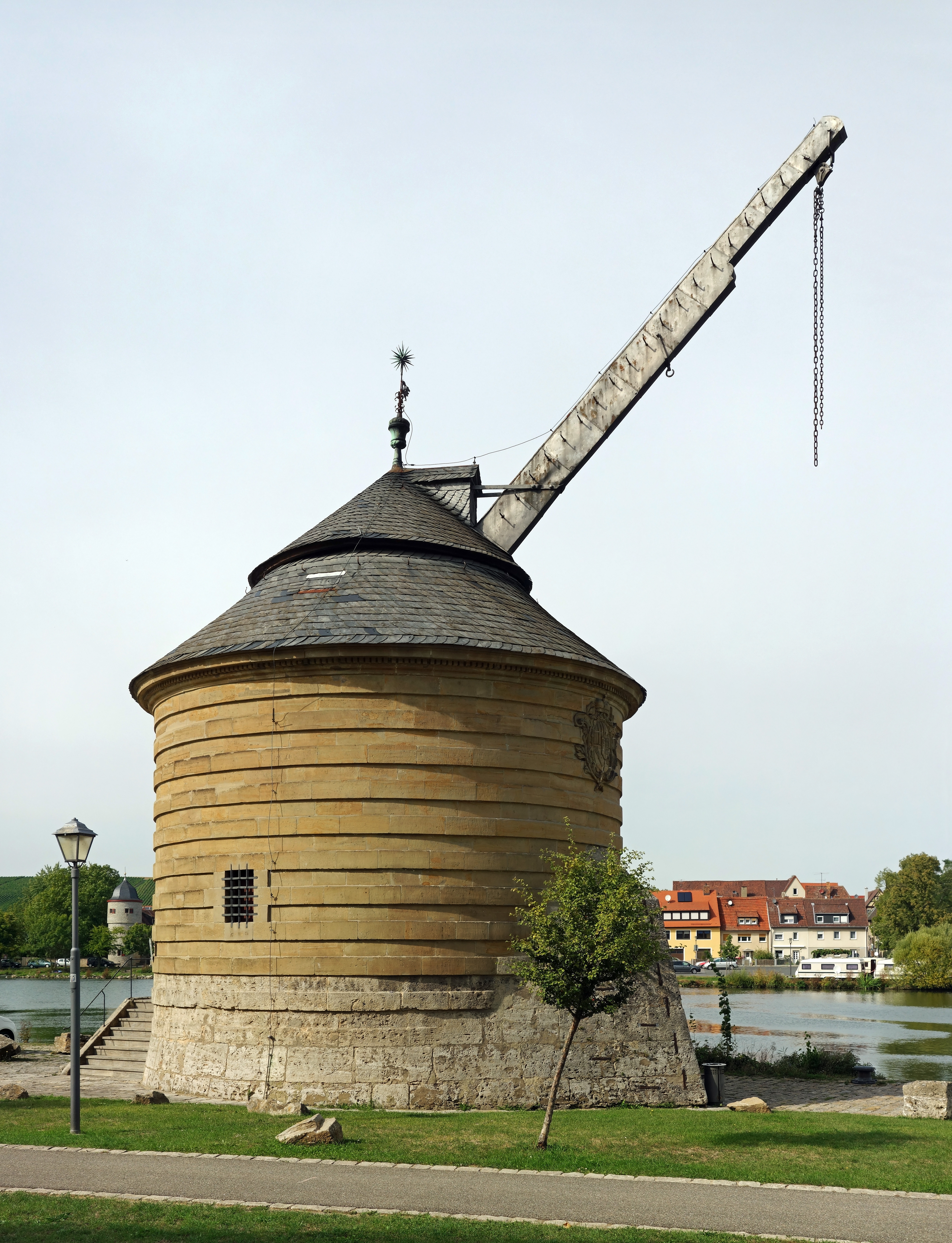
Alter Kranen

Gnodstadt was first mentioned in a document in 1124. Marktbreit was first mentioned as "broite inferior" in a document of the Count of Castell in 1258. From 1351 Gnodstadt was ruled by Hohenlohe-Brauneck. In 1557, King Ferdinand granted Marktbreit the right to hold markets, thus the name "Markt"breit that has since been used.

In the 17th and 18th century Marktbreit was an important marketplace because the shortest way to the Danube from the Main (which flows into the Rhine) starts in Marktbreit.

In 1806, Marktbreit came to the Kingdom of Bavaria.

Gnodstadt became a part of Marktbreit on 1 May 1978.

== Government ==
The town is a member of and the seat of the municipal association Marktbreit.

The town's mayor is Harald Kopp (SPD), elected in March 2020.

== Attractions ==
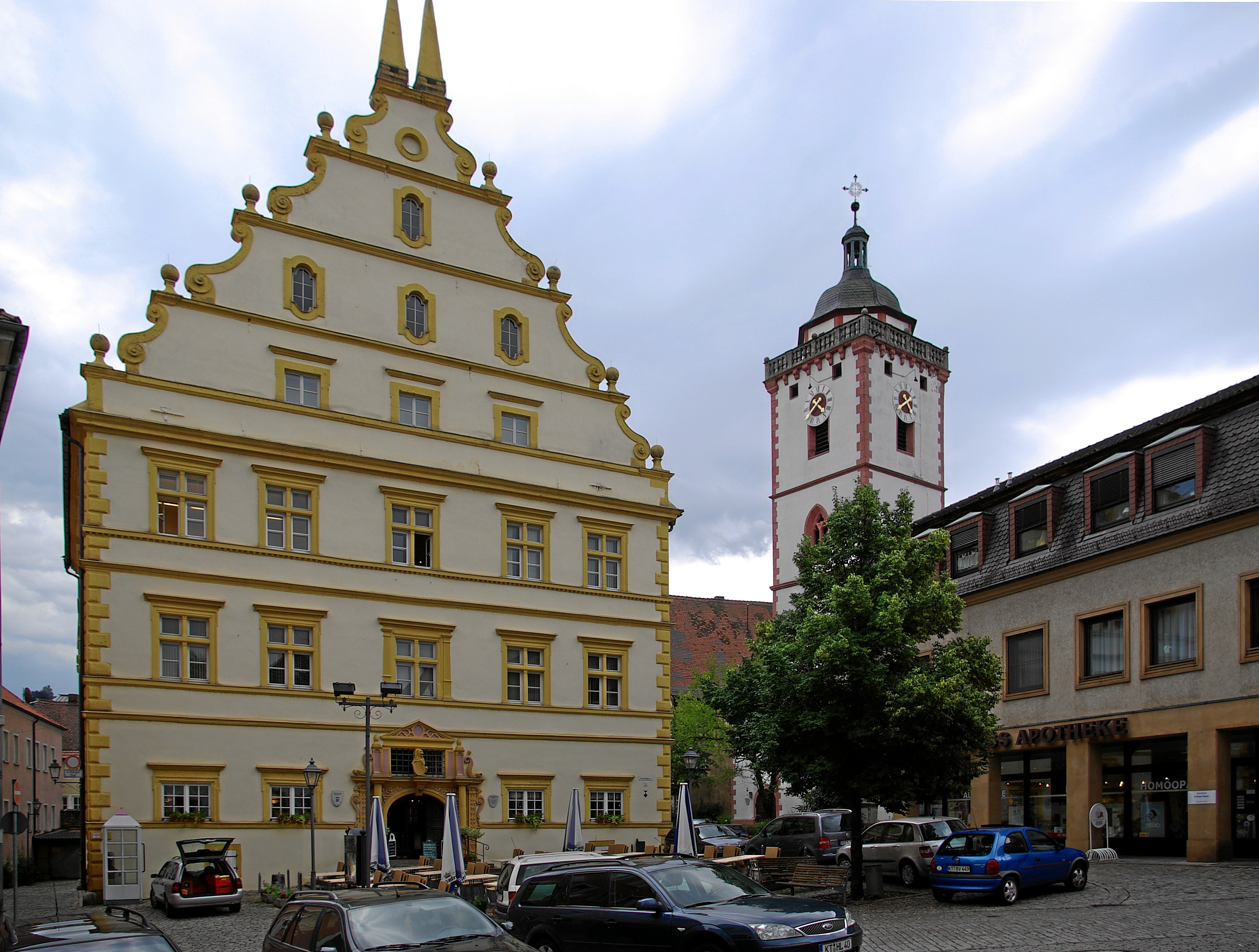
Schloss Marktbreit with St. Nicolai on the right

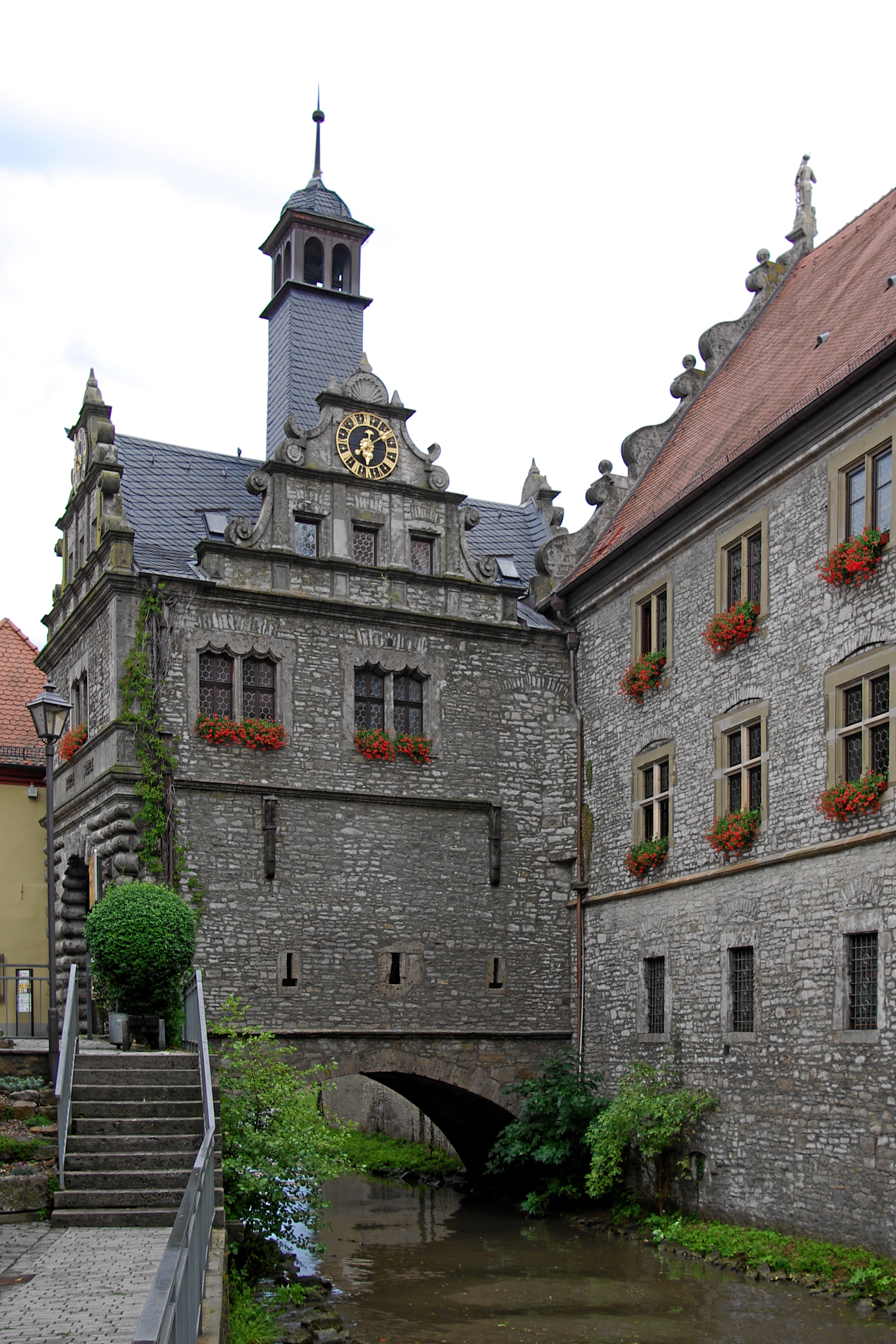
Maintor and town hall

See also List of Marktbreit monuments (German)

- Town hall, built after 1579 in Renaissance style
- Schloss Marktbreit, castle built after 1581
- St. Nicolai, Protestant church, originally from the 14th century
- St. Ludwig, Catholic church, 19th century
- Moritzkapelle, Gothic chapel that today serves as a memorial to the fallen soldiers from Kitzingen district
- Alter Kranen, historic crane on the Main river built in 1750
- Historic town wall with towers and one extant gate (Maintor)
- Historic half-timbered and Baroque buildings
- Museum Malerwinkelhaus
- Alois-Alzheimer-Gedenk- und Tagungsstätte, memorial to Alois Alzheimer with exhibition
- Mautpyramide von Gnodstadt, obelisk
- Synagogue, memorial to the Jewish soldiers from Marktbreit killed in World War I and to the 90 members of the Marktbreit synagogue murdered in the Holocaust

== Infrastructure ==
=== Transport ===
The Bundesautobahn 7 passes through the municipal territory, as does Bundesstraße 13.

Marktbreit has a station on the railway line Treuchtlingen–Würzburg. In the summer, it is also a stop for tourist ships travelling on the Main.

== Education ==
Marktbreit has three kindergartens, a Grundschule, Mittelschule, Realschule and a Gymnasium.

== Notable people ==
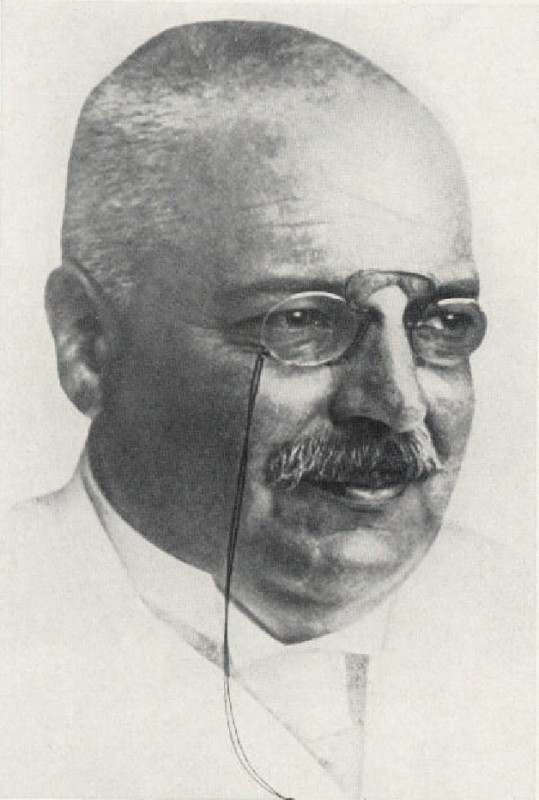
Alois Alzheimer

- Alois Alzheimer (1864–1915), neurologist and psychiatrist
- Rudolf Buttmann (1885–1947), jurist, librarian, NSDAP politician
- Ludwig Friedrich Barthel (1898–1962), Germanist, archivist, poet, narrator and essayist
