= Schwanberg =

Coordinates: 49°43′18″N 10°16′29″E

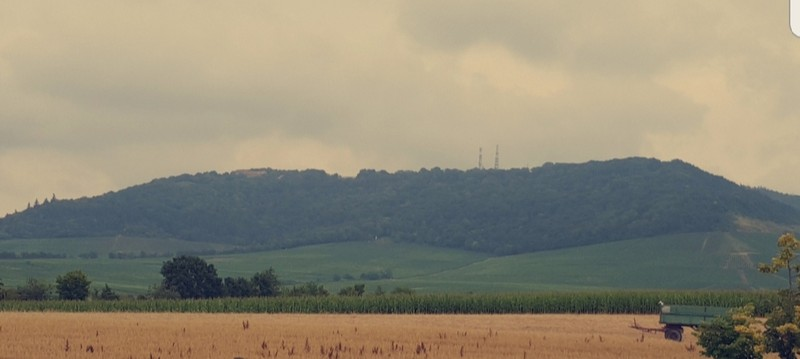
Schwanberg

Schwanberg is a mountain, or hill of higher elevation (474 m), in the rural district of Kitzingen, Regierungsbezirk Lower Franconia, Bavaria, Germany.

It is part of the Steigerwald. In ancient times the mountain was used by the Celts as a refuge. It is probably safe to assume that the mountain has been considered sacred ground since. Later, the counts of Castell build a castle that still exists today. The southern slopes are used for viniculture; the top of the mountain is covered by forest.

The schwartze Sulm ("Black Sulm") rises from the Schwanberg, eventually joining the weise Sulm ("White Sulm") to form the Sulm, a tributary of the Mur.

There are two burial sites on the Schwanberg, the vault of the princes of Castell, as well as the cemetery of the Protestant order Communität Casteller Ring. The latter emerged shortly after the 2nd World War from the Bavarian Girl Scout Movement "Bund Christlicher Pfadfinderinnen" (BCP). Members are still living on the mountain, where they maintain a retreat, the "Geistliches Zentrum Schwanberg" (Spiritual Center Schwanberg).

According to legend, Adeloga, a daughter of Charles Martel, set her veil flying from the top. An abbey should be built wherever it landed. A shepherd named Kitz found the veil near the river Main, which allegedly was the origin of the abbey and the town of Kitzingen. A play written for children retells the story; it is occasionally performed by school children of the region.

Parts of the region belonged to the county of Castell.

One road leads from the Rödelsee to the top of the mountain.

Towns and villages around the mountain are Castell, Rödelsee, Wiesenbronn, Iphofen, Birklingen and Greuth.
