= Breitbach (Main) =

River in Germany

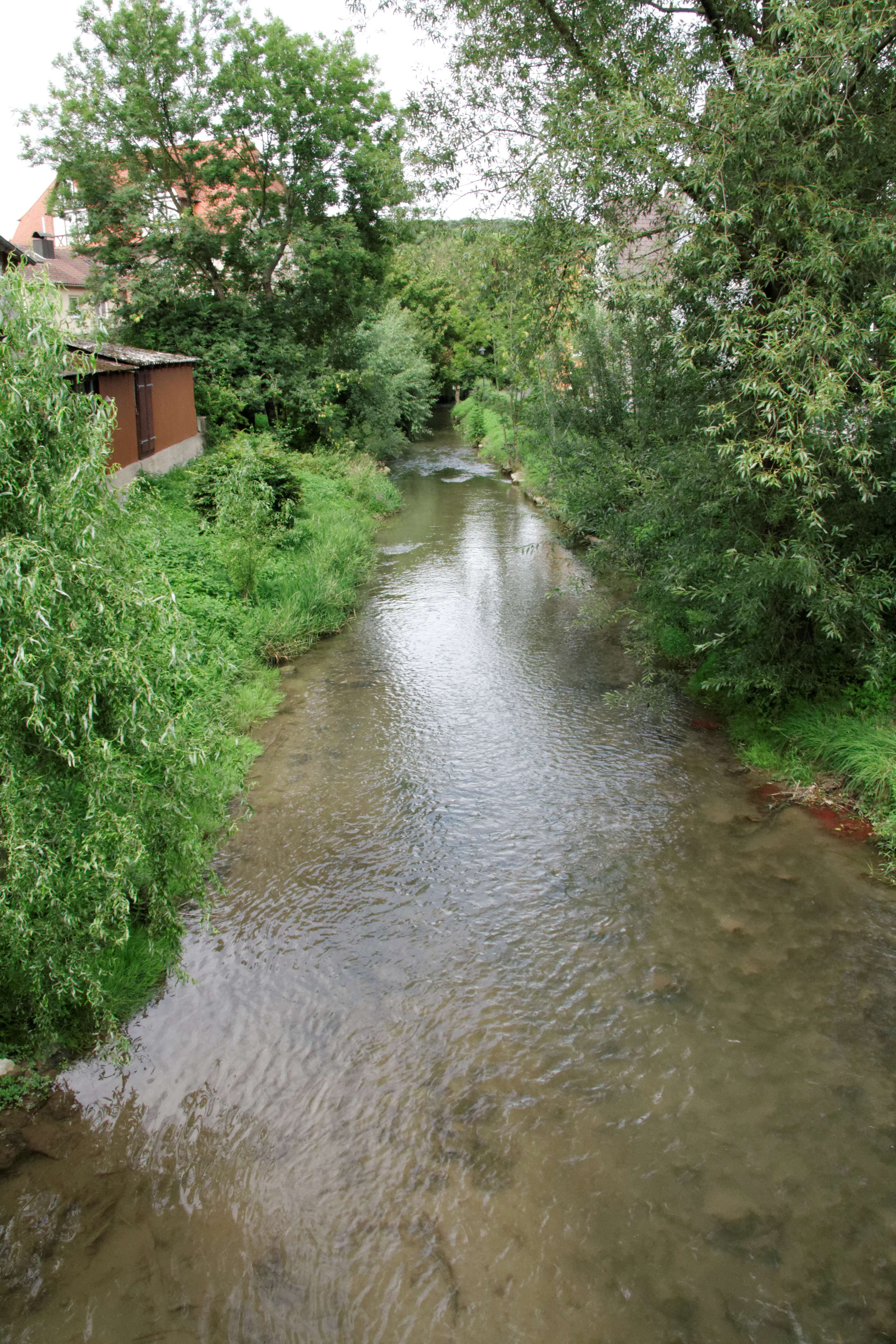
- The Breitbach near the town hall of Obernbreit

Location
- Country: Germany
- State: Bavaria

Physical characteristics
- Mouth
  - location: Main
  - coordinates: 49.6689°N 10.1419°E
- Length: 21.0 km (13.0 mi)

Basin features
- Progression: Main→ Rhine→ North Sea

Breitbach is a river of Bavaria, Germany. It is a left tributary of the Main in Marktbreit.

== See also ==
- List of rivers of Bavaria
