= Peter Rainer =

German violinist

Peter Rainer is a German violinist, known by his activity as a concert master and performance of chamber music. He has performed at major music venues such as Berliner Philharmonie, Carnegie Hall in New York City, and Walt Disney Concert Hall in Los Angeles.

== Career ==
Since 1994, Rainer has been concert master of the international chamber string orchestra I Palpiti conducted by Eduard Schmieder. In 2005 Peter Rainer was honoured by the city of Los Angeles.

During the period 1996 to 2000 Peter Rainer was the first concert master of the Brandenburg Philharmonic Orchestra Potsdam, and currently is concert master of the Kammerakademie Potsdam. Together with eight further soloists, in 1998 he founded the Persius Ensemble, a chamber music ensemble dedicated in particular to the classical nonet. In 2007 their CD with pieces of Louis Spohr, Muzio Clementi and Wolfgang Amadeus Mozart was elected "CD of the week" by Rundfunk Berlin Brandenburg (RBB).

In his performances as a soloist, Rainer concentrates on contemporary and rarely performed pieces of the violin repertoire. In 2003, the composer Gerhard Rosenfeld wrote his third violin concerto for Peter Rainer.

On the occasion of an homage for Volker Schlöndorff, Rainer founded the Merlino string quartet, distinguished by deep analysis of performance practice. His performances with baroque violin have been inspired also by concerts with Andrea Marcon, Giuliano Carmignola, John Holloway, Kristian Bezuidenhout and Bernhard Forck.

Apart from concert performances, Peter Rainer is a violin teacher. Since 2007 he has worked as an assistant to Uwe-Martin Haiberg at Universität der Künste Berlin. He has also conceptualized and executed particularly successful concerts for children.

== Education ==
Peter Rainer grew up in Rödelsee in Bavaria. He started playing violin at the age of 8 years. He was studying until 1992 with Max Speermann at the Hermann Zilcher Konservatorium in Würzburg. He completed his studies in the US with Professor Eduard Schmieder at the Meadows School of the Arts, where he received his Artist Certificate in 1994 and his Master of Violin Performance degree in 1995. Musical encounters with Hermann Krebbers, Amsterdam, and Andre Gertler, Brüssel, at master classes have also shaped his early development.
