= Kleinlangheim =

- Municipality
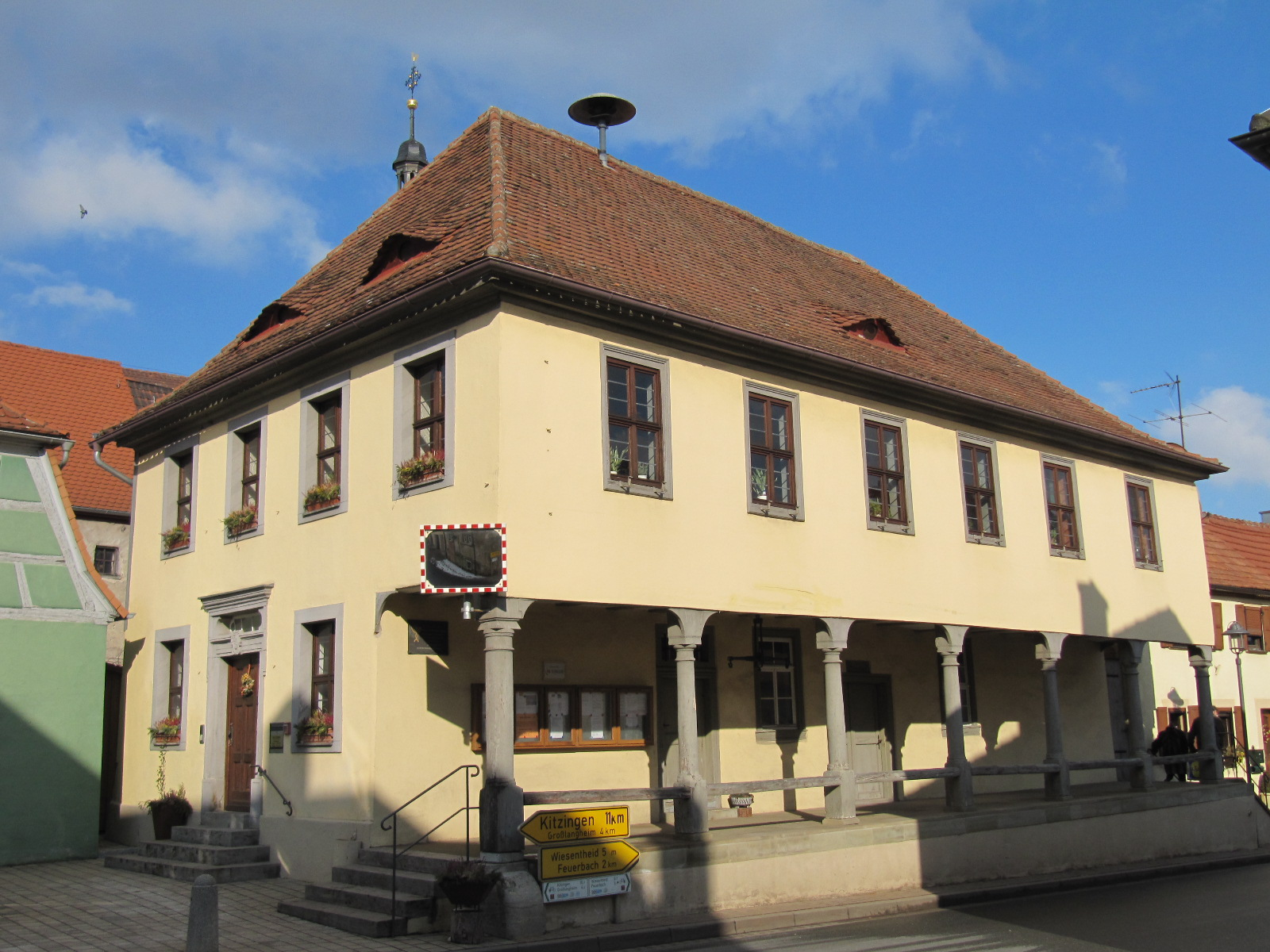
- Town hall

- Coat of arms

- Location of Kleinlangheim within Kitzingen district
- Interactive map of Kleinlangheim
- Location within Germany Location within Bavaria
- Coordinates: 49°46′N 10°16′E
- Country: Germany
- State: Bavaria
- Admin. region: Unterfranken
- District: Kitzingen
- Municipal assoc.: Großlangheim
- Subdivisions: 3 Ortsteile

Government
  - Mayor (2020–26): Gerlinde Stier

Area
  - Total: 19.09 km^{2} (7.37 sq mi)
- Elevation: 224 m (735 ft)

Population (2025-12-31)
  - Total: 1,664
  - Density: 87.17/km^{2} (225.8/sq mi)
- Time zone: UTC+01:00 (CET)
  - Summer (DST): UTC+02:00 (CEST)
- Postal codes: 97355
- Dialling codes: 09325
- Vehicle registration: KT
- Website: www.kleinlangheim.de

Kleinlangheim is a municipality in the district of Kitzingen in Lower Franconia, Bavaria in Germany.
