= Marktbreit (Verwaltungsgemeinschaft) =

- Verwaltungsgemeinschaft
- Location of Marktbreit within Kitzingen district
- Interactive map of Marktbreit
- Location within Germany Location within Bavaria
- Coordinates: 49°40′N 10°09′E
- Country: Germany
- State: Bavaria
- Admin. region: Lower Franconia
- District: Kitzingen
- Seat: Marktbreit
- Subdivisions: 6 municipalities

Area
  - Total: 83.96 km^{2} (32.42 sq mi)

Population (2025-12-31)
  - Total: 10,063
  - Density: 119.9/km^{2} (310.4/sq mi)
- Time zone: UTC+01:00 (CET)
  - Summer (DST): UTC+02:00 (CEST)
- Website: www.marktbreit.info

Marktbreit is a Verwaltungsgemeinschaft (municipal association) in the district of Kitzingen in Bavaria, Germany. Its seat is in Marktbreit.

It consists of the following municipalities:

1. Marktbreit
2. Marktsteft
3. Martinsheim
4. Obernbreit
5. Segnitz
6. Seinsheim
