= Paulus Aemilius (Hebrew scholar) =

Paulus Aemilius (ca. 1510 – 9 June 1575) was a Hebrew bibliographer, publisher, and teacher associated with the University of Ingolstadt

He was born in Rödelsee, Germany. He embraced Christianity in Rome. He was employed in copying Hebrew manuscripts, and for this purpose visited the libraries of Paris, Louvain, and Rome. In 1544 he edited and printed at Augsburg a Judaeo-German translation of the Pentateuch and the Haftarot, dedicating it to Johann Albrecht Widmannstetter, custodian of the Hebrew department of the Munich Library. Grünbaum (Jüdisch-Deutsche Chrestomathie, p. 14) thinks that Æmilius copied from the Cremona edition of 1540. The translation is, on the whole, the same which was used in 1901 in Poland. Perles supposes that Æmilius, together with Isaac of Günzburg, was the editor of the Judaeo-German Sefer midot (Book of Virtues), published at Isny in 1542. In 1547 Æmilius was appointed professor of Hebrew at Ingolstadt; and in the following year he published an anti-Jewish pamphlet. In 1562 he edited a Judaeo-German translation (in German characters) of the Books of Samuel, without, however, making known that it was a copy of a similar translation—though in Hebrew letters—published in Augsburg, 1543, by Chayyim Schwarz. In 1574 he was engaged for forty-six weeks at the Munich Library in making and revising the catalogue of Hebrew manuscripts and books. Thus Paulus Æmilius was the first Jewish bibliographer.

== Bibliography ==
Steinschneider, Sitzungsberichte der Bayrischen Akademie der Wissenschaften, Philosophisch-Philologische Classe, ii, 1875; Grünbaum, Jüdisch-Deutsche Chrestomathie, pp. 14 et seq.; Perles, in Monatsschrift, 1876, pp. 363–368; idem, Beiträge zur Gesch. der Hebräischen und Aramäischen Studien, pp. 155, 165, 170, Munich, 1884.
