= Sulzfeld am Main =

Sulzfeld a.Main
- Municipality
- Coat of arms

- Location of Sulzfeld a.Main within Kitzingen district
- Interactive map of Sulzfeld a.Main
- Location within Germany Location within Bavaria
- Coordinates: 49°42′N 10°7′E
- Country: Germany
- State: Bavaria
- Admin. region: Unterfranken
- District: Kitzingen
- Municipal assoc.: Kitzingen

Government
  - Mayor (2020–26): Matthias Dusel

Area
  - Total: 7.68 km^{2} (2.97 sq mi)
- Elevation: 202 m (663 ft)

Population (2025-12-31)
  - Total: 1,240
  - Density: 161/km^{2} (418/sq mi)
- Time zone: UTC+01:00 (CET)
  - Summer (DST): UTC+02:00 (CEST)
- Postal codes: 97320
- Dialling codes: 09321
- Vehicle registration: KT
- Website: www.sulzfeld-main.de

Sulzfeld am Main is a municipality in the district of Kitzingen in Bavaria in Germany.

== Mayor ==
- 1984–2020: Gerhard Schenkel (born 1955), he was reelected in 1990, 1996, 2002, 2008 and 2014.
- since 2020: Matthias Dusel (born 1968)

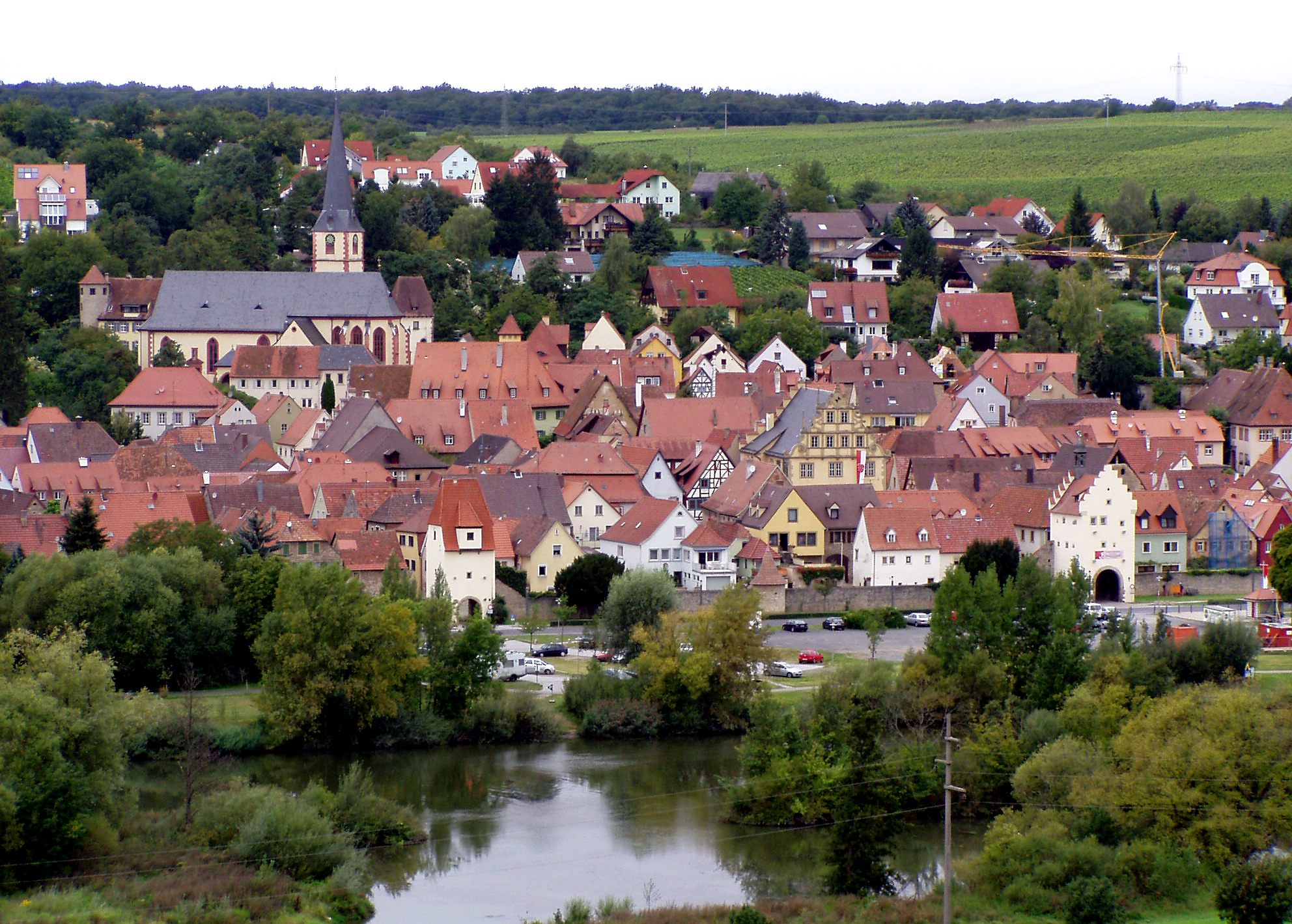
Sulzfeld am Main
