= Mainstockheim =

- Municipality
- Coat of arms

- Location of Mainstockheim within Kitzingen district
- Interactive map of Mainstockheim
- Location within Germany Location within Bavaria
- Coordinates: 49°46′N 10°10′E
- Country: Germany
- State: Bavaria
- Admin. region: Unterfranken
- District: Kitzingen
- Municipal assoc.: Kitzingen

Government
  - Mayor (2020–26): Karl-Dieter Fuchs

Area
  - Total: 8.52 km^{2} (3.29 sq mi)
- Elevation: 185–314 m (607–1,030 ft)

Population (2025-12-31)
  - Total: 1,939
  - Density: 228/km^{2} (589/sq mi)
- Time zone: UTC+01:00 (CET)
  - Summer (DST): UTC+02:00 (CEST)
- Postal codes: 97320
- Dialling codes: 09321
- Vehicle registration: KT

Mainstockheim is a municipality in the district of Kitzingen in Bavaria in Germany. It is famous for its choir, the Choir of Mainstockheim.

== Notable people ==
- Marie J. Mergler (1851–1901), physician
