= Kitzingen (Verwaltungsgemeinschaft) =

- Verwaltungsgemeinschaft
- Location of Kitzingen within Kitzingen district
- Interactive map of Kitzingen
- Location within Germany Location within Bavaria
- Coordinates: 49°44′N 10°10′E
- Country: Germany
- State: Bavaria
- Admin. region: Lower Franconia
- District: Kitzingen
- Seat: Kitzingen
- Subdivisions: 5 municipalities

Area
  - Total: 47.3 km^{2} (18.3 sq mi)

Population (2025-12-31)
  - Total: 7,657
  - Density: 162/km^{2} (419/sq mi)
- Time zone: UTC+01:00 (CET)
  - Summer (DST): UTC+02:00 (CEST)
- Website: www.vgem-kitzingen.de

Kitzingen is a Verwaltungsgemeinschaft (municipal association) in the district of Kitzingen in Bavaria, Germany. Its seat is in Kitzingen, itself not part of the Verwaltungsgemeinschaft.

It consists of the following municipalities:

1. Albertshofen
2. Biebelried
3. Buchbrunn
4. Mainstockheim
5. Sulzfeld am Main
