= Biebelried =

- Municipality
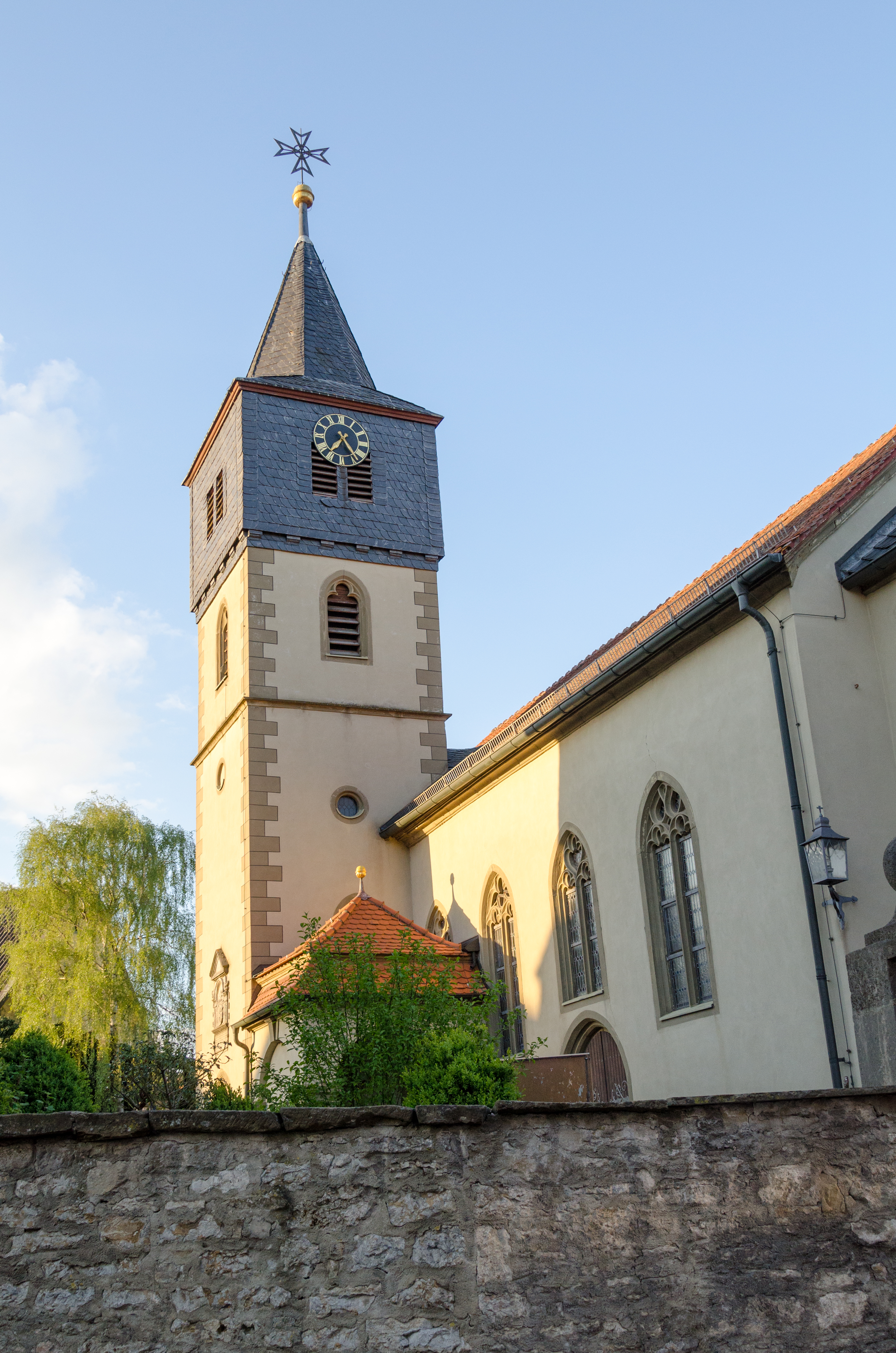
- Church of the Beheading of Saint John the Baptist

- Coat of arms

- Location of Biebelried within Kitzingen district
- Interactive map of Biebelried
- Location within Germany Location within Bavaria
- Coordinates: 49°46′N 10°5′E
- Country: Germany
- State: Bavaria
- Admin. region: Unterfranken
- District: Kitzingen
- Municipal assoc.: Kitzingen

Government
  - Mayor (2020–26): Roland Hoh

Area
  - Total: 22.70 km^{2} (8.76 sq mi)
- Elevation: 277 m (909 ft)

Population (2025-12-31)
  - Total: 1,282
  - Density: 56.48/km^{2} (146.3/sq mi)
- Time zone: UTC+01:00 (CET)
  - Summer (DST): UTC+02:00 (CEST)
- Postal codes: 97318
- Dialling codes: 09302
- Vehicle registration: KT
- Website: www.biebelried.de

Biebelried is a municipality in the district of Kitzingen in Bavaria in Germany.
