= Großlangheim =

- Municipality
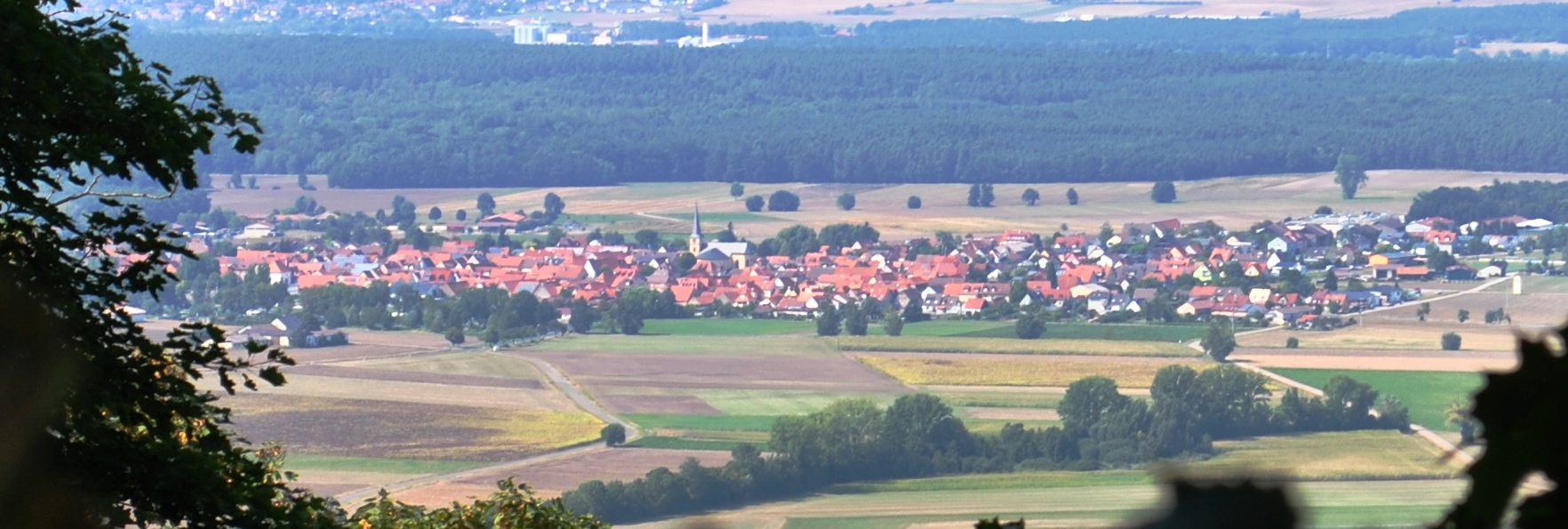
- Großlangheim seen from Schwanberg

- Coat of arms

- Location of Großlangheim within Kitzingen district
- Interactive map of Großlangheim
- Location within Germany Location within Bavaria
- Coordinates: 49°45′N 10°14′E
- Country: Germany
- State: Bavaria
- Admin. region: Unterfranken
- District: Kitzingen
- Municipal assoc.: Großlangheim

Government
  - Mayor (2020–26): Peter Sterk

Area
  - Total: 14.77 km^{2} (5.70 sq mi)
- Elevation: 224 m (735 ft)

Population (2025-12-31)
  - Total: 1,557
  - Density: 105.4/km^{2} (273.0/sq mi)
- Time zone: UTC+01:00 (CET)
  - Summer (DST): UTC+02:00 (CEST)
- Postal codes: 97320
- Dialling codes: 09325
- Vehicle registration: KT
- Website: www.grosslangheim.de

Großlangheim is a municipality in the district of Kitzingen in Bavaria in Germany.
