= Großlangheim (Verwaltungsgemeinschaft) =

- Verwaltungsgemeinschaft
- Location of Großlangheim within Kitzingen district
- Interactive map of Großlangheim
- Location within Germany Location within Bavaria
- Coordinates: 49°45′N 10°14′E
- Country: Germany
- State: Bavaria
- Admin. region: Lower Franconia
- District: Kitzingen
- Seat: Großlangheim
- Subdivisions: 3 municipalities

Area
  - Total: 44.43 km^{2} (17.15 sq mi)

Population (2025-12-31)
  - Total: 4,307
  - Density: 96.94/km^{2} (251.1/sq mi)
- Time zone: UTC+01:00 (CET)
  - Summer (DST): UTC+02:00 (CEST)
- Website: www.vgem-grosslangheim.de

Großlangheim is a Verwaltungsgemeinschaft (municipal association) in the district of Kitzingen in Bavaria, Germany. Its seat is in Großlangheim.

It consists of the following municipalities:

1. Großlangheim
2. Kleinlangheim
3. Wiesenbronn
