= Volkach (Verwaltungsgemeinschaft) =

- Verwaltungsgemeinschaft
- Location of Volkach within Kitzingen district
- Interactive map of Volkach
- Location within Germany Location within Bavaria
- Coordinates: 49°52′N 10°14′E
- Country: Germany
- State: Bavaria
- Admin. region: Lower Franconia
- District: Kitzingen
- Seat: Volkach
- Subdivisions: 3 municipalities

Area
  - Total: 71.16 km^{2} (27.48 sq mi)

Population (2025-12-31)
  - Total: 10,923
  - Density: 153.5/km^{2} (397.6/sq mi)
- Time zone: UTC+01:00 (CET)
  - Summer (DST): UTC+02:00 (CEST)

Volkach is a Verwaltungsgemeinschaft (municipal association) in the district of Kitzingen in Bavaria, Germany. Its seat is in Volkach.

It consists of the following municipalities:

1. Nordheim am Main
2. Sommerach
3. Volkach
