= Sommerach =

- Municipality
- Coat of arms

- Location of Sommerach within Kitzingen district
- Interactive map of Sommerach
- Location within Germany Location within Bavaria
- Coordinates: 49°49′N 10°11′E
- Country: Germany
- State: Bavaria
- Admin. region: Unterfranken
- District: Kitzingen
- Municipal assoc.: Volkach

Government
  - Mayor (2020–26): Elisabeth Drescher (CSU)

Area
  - Total: 5.67 km^{2} (2.19 sq mi)
- Elevation: 202 m (663 ft)

Population (2025-12-31)
  - Total: 1,493
  - Density: 263/km^{2} (682/sq mi)
- Time zone: UTC+01:00 (CET)
  - Summer (DST): UTC+02:00 (CEST)
- Postal codes: 97334
- Dialling codes: 09381
- Vehicle registration: KT
- Website: www.sommerach.de

Sommerach is a municipality in the district of Kitzingen in Bavaria in Germany.

== Geography ==
Sommerach is located on the southern part of the river Main loop on the so-called Wine Island ("Weininsel"). It is 3 km (2 mi.) away from the motorway A3 (exit Kitzingen/Schwarzach/Volkach).
