= Thecla of Kitzingen =

Benedictine abbess and saint

Saint Thecla of Kitzingen OSB
- Born: southern Britain
- Died: ~AD 790; Germany
- Venerated in: Roman Catholic Church
- Feast: 15 October

Saint Thecla of Kitzingen (Tecla of England, Heilga) (died ca. AD 790) was an Anglo-Saxon Benedictine nun, abbess, and missionary. She was among several figures associated with Saint Boniface and the Anglo-Saxon mission.

== Background ==
Sometime after the death of Aldfrith of Northumbria around the year 705, his widow, Cuthburh, the sister of King Ine of Wessex, established a double-monastery in her brother's kingdom at Wimborne in Dorset. St. Richard of Wessex was one of the underkings of the West Saxons and married Winna, the sister of St. Boniface. Before starting on a pilgrimage to the Holy Land with his two sons, Richard entrusted his eleven-year-old daughter Walpurga to the abbess of Wimborne. The nuns of Wimborne Abbey educated Walpurga, and she later became a community member. Boniface kept up a frequent correspondence with the community of Wimborne.

== Life ==
Born in southern Britain, Thecla was a relative of Saint Lioba. Thecla and Lioba were educated at Wimborne Abbey and later joined the Benedictine community of nuns there. When Boniface wrote to the Abbess Tetta, requesting helpers with his missionary work in Germany, Thecla and Lioba were among those sent. Boniface seems to have had a threefold purpose in summoning these Anglo-Saxon nuns as his auxiliaries: to propagate the full observance of the Benedictine Rule by new foundations, to introduce it into already founded monasteries, and to restore its observance in others, and finally, to bring their gentle influence to bear on the local people, both by example and by the education imparted to their children.

In 748, they arrived in Bischofsheim ("bishop's place"), where Boniface founded a convent, and Lioba was made abbess. Later, Thecla became abbess of Ochsenfurt. Sometime after 750, upon the death of Hadelonga, foundress and first Abbess of Kitzingen on the Main, she was also called to supervise that abbey.

== Veneration ==
Her feast day is 15 October, but alternative feast days of 27 or 28 September also appear in liturgical books. Thecla’s relics were enshrined during the Middle Ages at Kitzingen but were later dispersed during the German Peasants' War. She is also venerated in the Eastern Orthodox Church.

== Sources ==
- Asamblea Eucarística. México: Ed. Progreso. 2009. ISSN 0187-876X.
