= Buchbrunn =

- Municipality
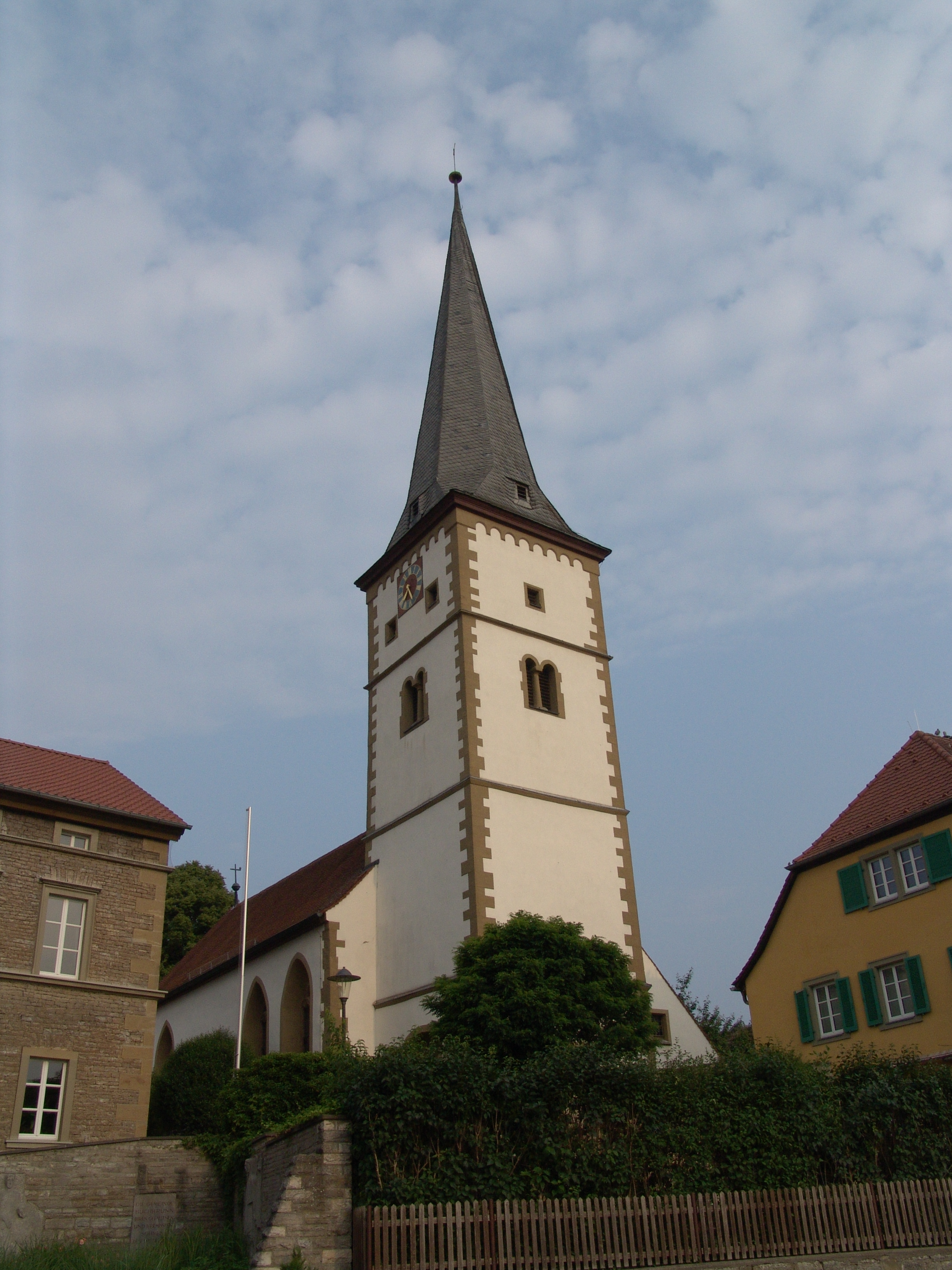
- Church of Saint Mary Magdalene

- Coat of arms

- Location of Buchbrunn within Kitzingen district
- Interactive map of Buchbrunn
- Location within Germany Location within Bavaria
- Coordinates: 49°46′N 10°08′E
- Country: Germany
- State: Bavaria
- Admin. region: Unterfranken
- District: Kitzingen
- Municipal assoc.: Kitzingen

Government
  - Mayor (2020–26): Hermann Queck

Area
  - Total: 4.57 km^{2} (1.76 sq mi)
- Elevation: 249 m (817 ft)

Population (2025-12-31)
  - Total: 1,089
  - Density: 238/km^{2} (617/sq mi)
- Time zone: UTC+01:00 (CET)
  - Summer (DST): UTC+02:00 (CEST)
- Postal codes: 97320
- Dialling codes: 09321
- Vehicle registration: KT
- Website: www.buchbrunn.de

Buchbrunn is a municipality in the district of Kitzingen, Lower Franconia, Bavaria, Germany. It is placed in the Bayrische Planungsregion 2.

== History ==
Several archaeological troves in the boundary of Buchbrunn show that the village which is documented for the first time in 1244 has been a settling area from time immemorial. Among the miscellaneous feudal lords during the 13th and 14th century occur the Lords of Buchbrunn and the Benedictine Sisters' abbey of Kitzingen. Later the Margraves of Ansbach and the Counts of Schwarzenberg possessed important rights on the spot that became Bavarian in 1814. The coat of arms featuring a beech tree (Buche in German) and a well (Brunnen) is based on an old seal of the village court from the 17th century. Today one is even confronted with this symbol for Buchbrunn on the village square, where a beech has been planted alongside the old well. Since 1978 the village is part of the Verwaltungsgemeinschaft Kitzingen and has about 1.000 residents.

== Churches ==
=== Lutheran ===
In ab. 1470/80 a new church was built using the romanesque spire of the predecessor chapel. In 1683 the nave was extended and the spire was heightened. Inside one can find an altar crucifix from ab. 1480, a well worked baptismal font furnished with the benefactor's coat of arms and a painting influenced by Lucas Cranach the Elder and Younger which shows a last supper administered by Martin Luther and Philip Melanchthon.

==== Parish registers ====
The Lutheran registers start in 1556 and are stored in the Bischöfliche Zentralarchiv in Regensburg.

=== Catholic ===
The church Mariä Himmelfahrt was sanctified in 1805. The baroque décor from the time between 1680 and 1780 derives from churches in Würzburg and Kitzingen that were suspended during the Napoleonic period.

=== Cemetery ===
In 1611 it was displaced to the outskirts of the village. The ornamented stone lectern from this time is still existing in the middle of the God's acre. The round arch entry portal shows the date 1611 and the crest of Ansbach.

== Education ==
=== School ===
The Verbandsschule Buchbrunn , attended by ab. 450 students is an elementary school (grade 1-4) as well as the Hauptschule (grade 5-9) of the Verwaltungsgemeinschaft Kitzingen. It has subsidiaries in Mainstockheim (grade 1-4) and in Kaltensondheim (grade 1-3). Secondary schools of choice are e. g. the Armin-Knab-Gymnasium in Kitzingen, the Richard-Rother Realschule in Kitzingen or Friedrich-Bernbeck-Schule Staatliche Wirtschaftschule in Kitzingen.

== Traffic ==
=== Railroad line ===
Buchbrunn is near the railway station Buchbrunn-Mainstockheim (schedule) on the railway line from Nürnberg (1 hour) to Würzburg (15 minutes) which was established in 1865. The old railway station building was torn down in the 1970s. In former times it featured a station restaurant that attracted many promenaders because of the nice outlook it provided on the valley of the river Main. The restaurant building is still standing today and used as a residential house.

=== Roads ===
A country road supplemented with a bicycle lane connects Buchbrunn with the city of Kitzingen. The village is as well tangented to the road from Mainstockheim to the Bundesstraße 8 which provides access to Repperndorf and Kitzingen again in the Nürnberg direction and to the Autobahns A7 and A3 as well as to the village of Biebelried in the Würzburg direction. For completion one could as well mention the more or less unofficial shortcuts via concreted field paths to Kitzingen (across the Eselsberg), Mainstockheim (and via this way the city of Dettelbach as well), Repperndorf, Neuhof (hamlet near Biebelried) as well as the Mainfrankenpark.

== Sport ==
The TSV Buchbrunn (official website featuring a detailed chronicle) was founded in 1947 and is best known for its soccer and table tennis teams. It also has compartments for children's gymnastics and others.
