= Ludwig Friedrich Barthel =

German writer

Ludwig Friedrich Barthel (12 June 1898, in Marktbreit – 14 February 1962, in Munich) was a German writer.

Barthel served in the First World War and was a student in Munich. He was later an archivist (German: Archivrat) there. His poems, for example "Tannenburg: Ruf und Requiem" (Tannenberg: A Call and a Requiem; 1934), and such stories as "Das Leben ruft" (Life Calls; 1935), are influenced by the experience of war, which he made into a cult. Because of such tendencies, he venerated Nazism, which he celebrated in such extravagant hymns as "Dom aller Deutschen" (The Cathedral of All Germans; 1938).

Barthel also edited the letters of his friend Rudolf Binding (1957).

== Bibliography ==
- Christian Zentner, Friedemann Bedürftig (1991). The Encyclopedia of the Third Reich. Macmillan, New York. ISBN 0-02-897502-2
