= Communität Casteller Ring =

Communität Casteller Ring (CCR) is a Religious order for women in the Evangelical Lutheran Church in Bavaria.

The order was founded by Christel Schmid (1892-1970); during World War II, she and seven young Christian women formed a group of Christian Girl Guides and this group was formalised in 1946. CCR emerged shortly after the war from the Bavarian Girl Guide Movement Bund Christlicher Pfadfinderinnen. Mater Schmid led the order until 1969, when Maria Scholasika Pfister CCR took on the role.

In 2025, the prioress is Sr. Ursula Teresa Buske.

The Religious community lives in the spirit of the Rule of St Benedict. The mother house is in Schwanberg. From 1996 until Easter 2011, sisters of the Casteller Ring staffed St. Augustine's Monastery in Erfurt, where Martin Luther lived as a monk. The order has close links to the Münsterschwarzach Abbey.

In 2025, the order runs Schwanberg Spiritual Center which includes a convent, three guest houses and a café; guests are offered spiritual guidance and courses in liturgical singing, psalms, Bible study, meditation, grief counselling and music therapy.

In 2025, there are 38 sisters living with poverty, chastity, obedience and the Benedictine Rule.

CCR also has oblates and circle of friends.
