= Albertshofen =

- Municipality
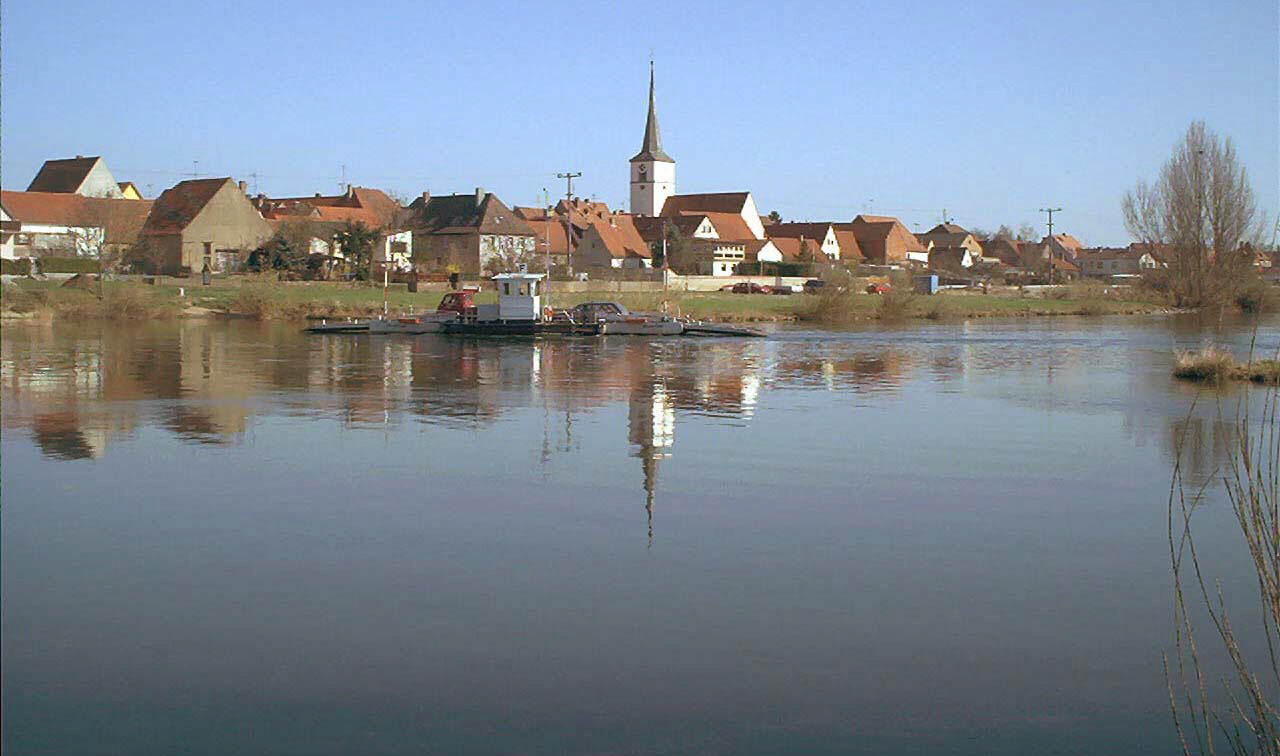
- Albertshofen

- Coat of arms

- Location of Albertshofen within Kitzingen district
- Interactive map of Albertshofen
- Location within Germany Location within Bavaria
- Coordinates: 49°46′N 10°10′E
- Country: Germany
- State: Bavaria
- Admin. region: Unterfranken
- District: Kitzingen
- Municipal assoc.: Kitzingen

Government
  - Mayor (2020–26): Horst Reuther (CSU)

Area
  - Total: 3.80 km^{2} (1.47 sq mi)
- Elevation: 185–215 m (607–705 ft)

Population (2025-12-31)
  - Total: 2,107
  - Density: 554/km^{2} (1,440/sq mi)
- Time zone: UTC+01:00 (CET)
  - Summer (DST): UTC+02:00 (CEST)
- Postal codes: 97320
- Dialling codes: 09321
- Vehicle registration: KT
- Website: www.kitzingen.de/

Albertshofen is a municipality in the district of Kitzingen in Bavaria in Germany.
