= Kitzingen (district) =

- District
- Flag Coat of arms
- Coordinates: 49°45′N 10°10′E
- Country: Germany
- State: Bavaria
- Adm. region: Lower Franconia
- Capital: Kitzingen

Government
  - District admin.: Tamara Bischof (FW)

Area
  - Total: 684 km^{2} (264 sq mi)

Population (31 December 2025)
  - Total: 91,471
  - Density: 134/km^{2} (346/sq mi)
- Time zone: UTC+01:00 (CET)
  - Summer (DST): UTC+02:00 (CEST)
- Vehicle registration: KT
- Website: www.kitzingen.de

Kitzingen is a Landkreis (district) in Bavaria, Germany. It is bounded by (from the north and clockwise) the districts of Schweinfurt, Bamberg, Neustadt (Aisch)-Bad Windsheim and Würzburg.

== History ==
The district in its present form was established in the administrative reform of 1973. The former district of Gerolzhofen was dissolved, and half of its territory was merged with the Kitzingen district (which had been much smaller before). The city of Kitzingen lost its status as a district-free city and was incorporated into the district.

== Geography ==
The river Main runs through the district from north to south.

== Coat of arms ==
The coat of arms displays:

- the bridge from the arms of the town of Kitzingen
- the grapes are symbolising the viticulture
- the shield in the left is from the Bishopric of Würzburg, which once ruled over the region
- the shield in the right is from the arms of the principality of Castell

== Towns and municipalities ==
Clickable map of towns and municipalities in the district

Towns
1. Dettelbach
2. Kitzingen
3. Mainbernheim
4. Prichsenstadt
Märkte
1. Geiselwind
2. Schwarzach am Main

Verwaltungsgemeinschaften
1. Großlangheim; 1. Großlangheim^{1,3}; 2. Kleinlangheim^{3}; 3. Wiesenbronn; 2. Iphofen; 1. Iphofen^{1,2}; 2. Markt Einersheim^{3}; 3. Rödelsee; 4. Willanzheim^{3}	3. Kitzingen; 1. Albertshofen; 2. Biebelried; 3. Buchbrunn; 4. Mainstockheim; 5. Sulzfeld am Main	4. Marktbreit; 1. Marktbreit^{1,2}; 2. Marktsteft^{2}; 3. Martinsheim; 4. Obernbreit^{3}; 5. Segnitz; 6. Seinsheim^{3}	5. Volkach; 1. Nordheim am Main; 2. Sommerach; 3. Volkach^{1,2}; 6. Wiesentheid; 1. Abtswind^{3}; 2. Castell; 3. Rüdenhausen^{3}; 4. Wiesentheid^{1,3}
^{1}seat of the Verwaltungsgemeinschaft; ^{2}town; ^{3}Markt
