= Adeloga of Kitzingen =

German saint

St. Adeloga of Kitzingen
- Died: c. 745; Germany
- Venerated in: Roman Catholic Church
- Canonized: Pre-congregation
- Feast: February 2
- Tradition or genre: Benedictine

St. Adeloga of Kitzingen, also known as Hadeloga and Adela, is a German saint. Her father was Charles Martel, a Frankish statesman and military leader. She was a princess and "of singular beauty". She was sought after for marriage, but she refused, wanting to devote herself to God instead. Her father treated her with "studied brutality and public insult"; she went to his chaplain, who was also her spiritual director, for support and advice, so Martel expelled them both from his palace. They journeyed to Kitzingen, in modern Bavaria, a "wild and desert place", where they built a convent. She was made the convent's first abbess; the convent attracted virgins and was directed to follow the rules of St. Benedict and St. Scholastica. Martel later reconciled with and visited Adeloga, and donated lands for her convent.

St. Adeloga is listed in the Benedictine Martyrology, and an ancient biography of her written by an anonymous author and published by Flemish hagiographer Jean Bolland. After her death, she was succeeded at the Kitzingen convent by St. Thecla.

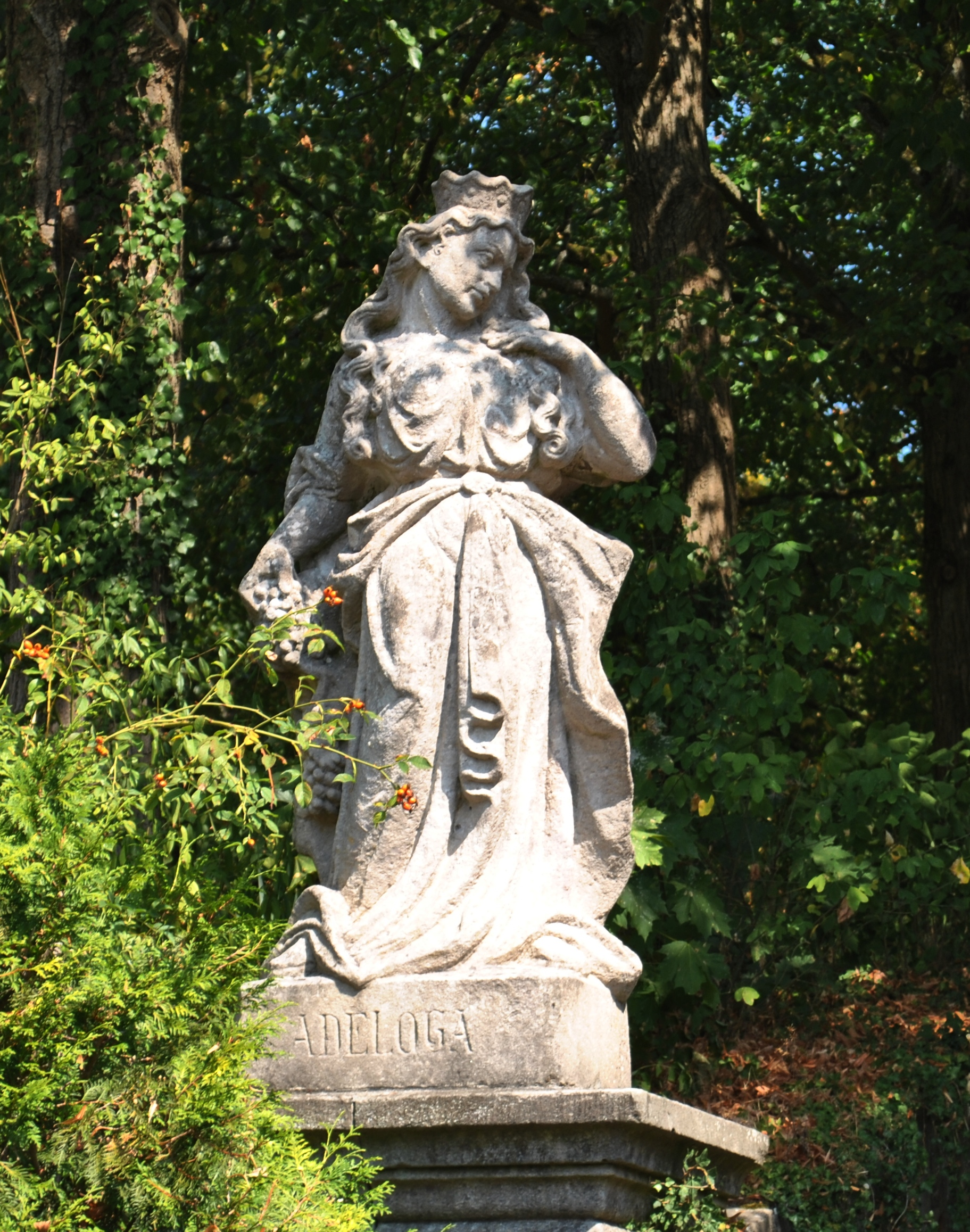
St Adeloga
