= Martinsheim =

- Municipality
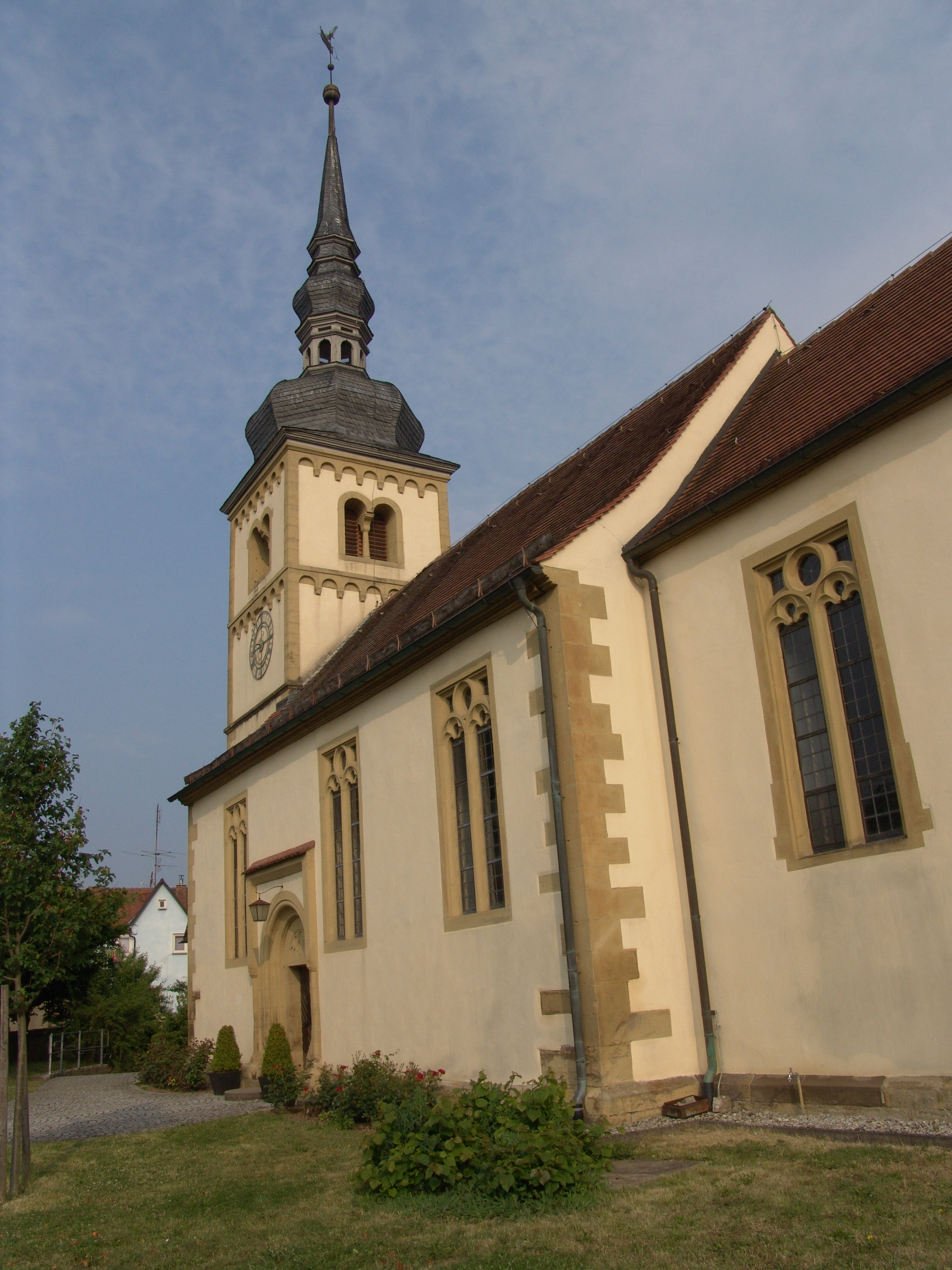
- Church of Saint John in Gnötzheim

- Coat of arms

- Location of Martinsheim within Kitzingen district
- Interactive map of Martinsheim
- Location within Germany Location within Bavaria
- Coordinates: 49°37′N 10°9′E
- Country: Germany
- State: Bavaria
- Admin. region: Unterfranken
- District: Kitzingen
- Municipal assoc.: Marktbreit

Government
  - Mayor (2020–26): Rainer Ott (FW)

Area
  - Total: 23.22 km^{2} (8.97 sq mi)
- Elevation: 286 m (938 ft)

Population (2025-12-31)
  - Total: 1,013
  - Density: 43.63/km^{2} (113.0/sq mi)
- Time zone: UTC+01:00 (CET)
  - Summer (DST): UTC+02:00 (CEST)
- Postal codes: 97340
- Dialling codes: 09332 bzw. 09339
- Vehicle registration: KT
- Website: www.martinsheim.de

Martinsheim is a municipality in the district of Kitzingen in Bavaria in Germany.
