= Nordheim am Main =

Nordheim a.Main
- Municipality
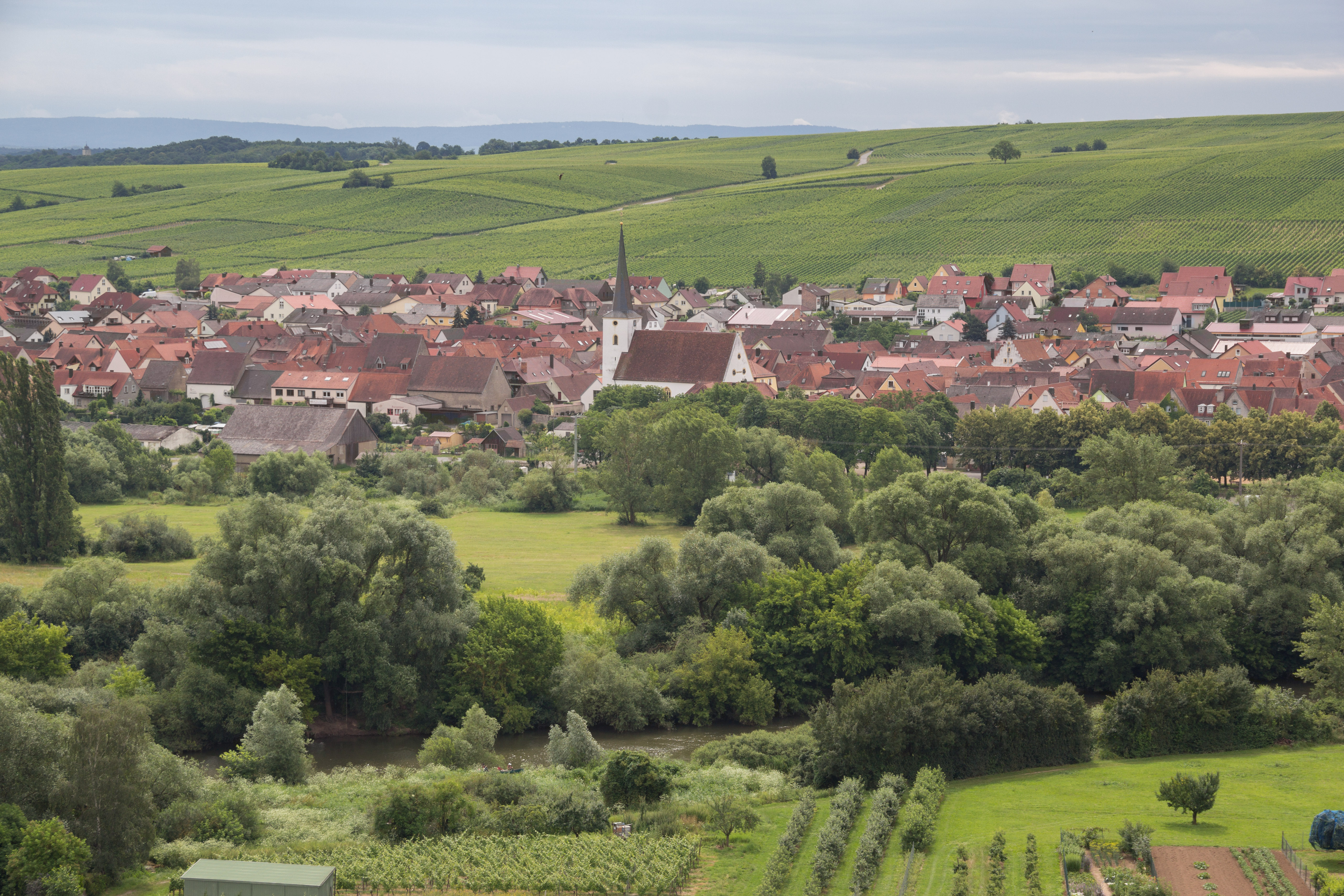
- Nordheim seen from the north

- Coat of arms

- Location of Nordheim a.Main within Kitzingen district
- Interactive map of Nordheim a.Main
- Location within Germany Location within Bavaria
- Coordinates: 49°31′N 10°07′E
- Country: Germany
- State: Bavaria
- Admin. region: Unterfranken
- District: Kitzingen
- Municipal assoc.: Volkach

Government
  - Mayor (2020–26): Sibylle Säger (CSU)

Area
  - Total: 5.30 km^{2} (2.05 sq mi)
- Elevation: 196 m (643 ft)

Population (2025-12-31)
  - Total: 980
  - Density: 180/km^{2} (480/sq mi)
- Time zone: UTC+01:00 (CET)
  - Summer (DST): UTC+02:00 (CEST)
- Postal codes: 97334
- Dialling codes: 09381
- Vehicle registration: KT
- Website: www.nordheim-main.de

Nordheim am Main is a municipality in the district of Kitzingen in Bavaria in Germany.
