= Segnitz =

- Municipality
- Coat of arms

- Location of Segnitz within Kitzingen district
- Interactive map of Segnitz
- Location within Germany Location within Bavaria
- Coordinates: 49°40′N 10°8′E
- Country: Germany
- State: Bavaria
- Admin. region: Unterfranken
- District: Kitzingen
- Municipal assoc.: Marktbreit

Government
  - Mayor (2020–26): Peter Matterne (CSU)

Area
  - Total: 2.76 km^{2} (1.07 sq mi)
- Elevation: 181 m (594 ft)

Population (2025-12-31)
  - Total: 803
  - Density: 291/km^{2} (754/sq mi)
- Time zone: UTC+01:00 (CET)
  - Summer (DST): UTC+02:00 (CEST)
- Postal codes: 97340
- Dialling codes: 09332
- Vehicle registration: KT
- Website: www.kitzingen.de

Segnitz is a municipality in the district of Kitzingen in Bavaria in Germany, 25 km south of Würzburg on the Main river. The village is well known as the home of Renaissance master builder Hans Keesebrod, horticulture and wine and has less than 850 inhabitants.

== Italo Svevo, Samuel Spier and Segnitz ==
Segnitz is especially famous as the village where Triestine writer Italo Svevo (pseudonym of Ettore Schmitz) and his Brother Adolfo spent almost five school years (May 1874-September 1878) in a private boarding school, called the Brüsselsche Institut (named after its founder, Julius Brüssel *1802–1855). Another Brother, Elio, came to Segnitz 1876-78. In contrast to his brothers, Elio was weak and homesick, but he wrote a diary about his time in Segnitz. This diary is now an important source for the obviously "social" background in Svevo's writing.

The Brüsselsche Institut existed in Segnitz from 1838 until 1881. After Brüssel’s early death, it was run by his son-in-law Dr. Louis Eichenberg who brought it to international fame and sold it to Samuel Spier at the height of its importance in 1872. Spier, a teacher and politician, was one of the founding fathers of the Social Democratic Party of Germany. He came to Segnitz after the Franco-Prussian War in a self-imposed exile after he had been accused in the first high treason trial of the newly founded German Empire. He spent seven months in prison, during which he lost part of his sizable inherited fortune, because he could not take care of his business. All of the defendants were eventually only found guilty for a minor offense for which Spier received two months but no compensation for his losses and for being in prison more than three times longer.) Samuel Spier is "Mr. Beer" in Svevo's novella "L'avvenire dei ricordi" ("The Future of our Memories", originally titled by Svevo only by a date, probably the day when he started to write it: 1. 5. 1925) whose action takes place in Segnitz.
