= Marktsteft =

- Town
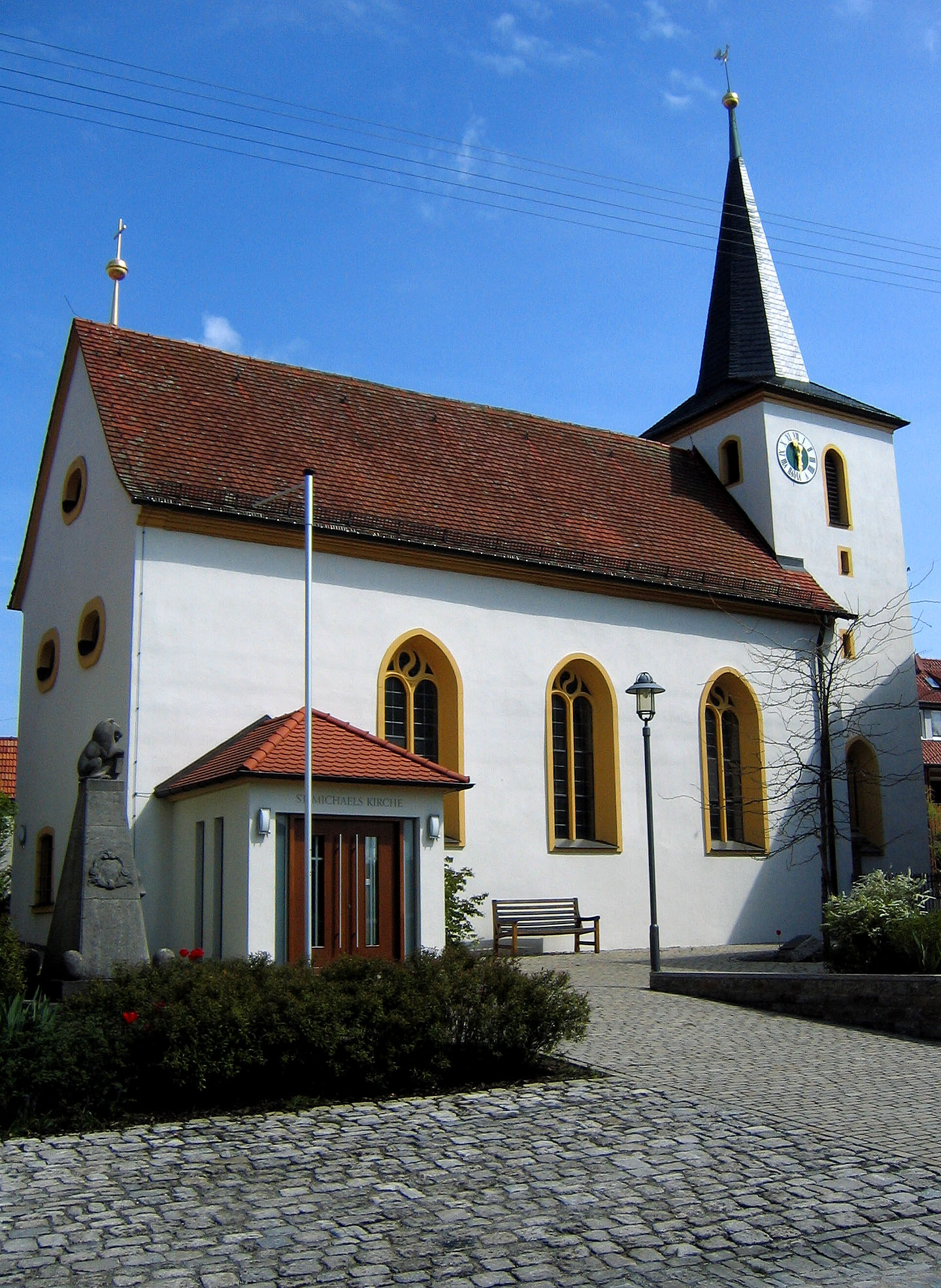
- Church of Saint Michael

- Coat of arms

- Location of Marktsteft within Kitzingen district
- Interactive map of Marktsteft
- Location within Germany Location within Bavaria
- Coordinates: 49°42′N 10°7′E
- Country: Germany
- State: Bavaria
- Admin. region: Unterfranken
- District: Kitzingen
- Municipal assoc.: Marktbreit

Government
  - Mayor (2020–26): Thomas Reichert (CSU)

Area
  - Total: 10.51 km^{2} (4.06 sq mi)
- Elevation: 189 m (620 ft)

Population (2025-12-31)
  - Total: 1,801
  - Density: 171.4/km^{2} (443.8/sq mi)
- Time zone: UTC+01:00 (CET)
  - Summer (DST): UTC+02:00 (CEST)
- Postal codes: 97342
- Dialling codes: 09332
- Vehicle registration: KT
- Website: www.marktsteft.de

Marktsteft (German: [maʁktˈʃtɛft]) is a town in the district of Kitzingen, in Bavaria, Germany. It is situated on the left bank of the Main, 5 km (3 mi) southwest of Kitzingen.

It was the birthplace (1885) of the well-known Second World War general Albert Kesselring.
