= Volkach =

- Town
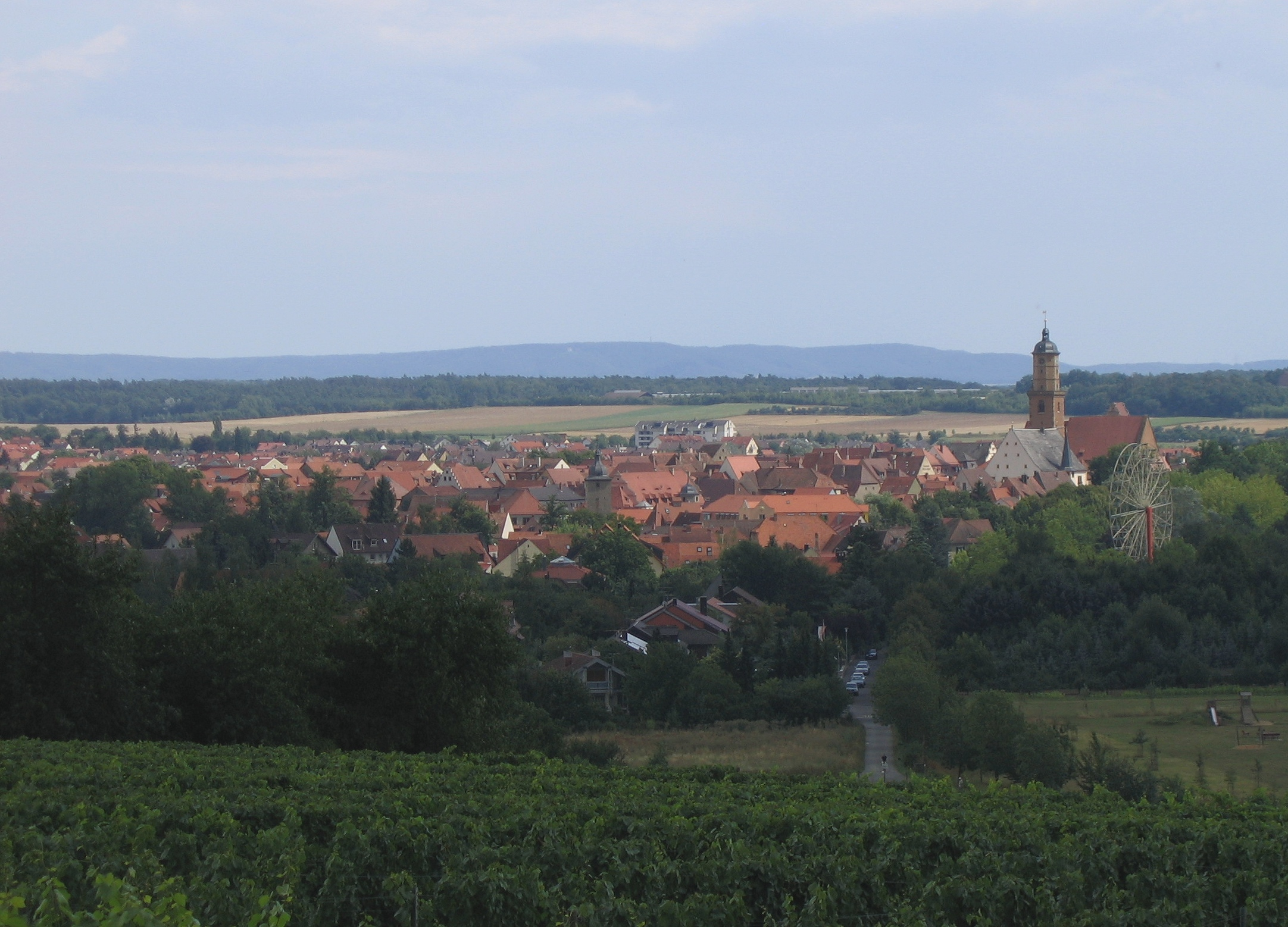

- Coat of arms

- Location of Volkach within Kitzingen district
- Interactive map of Volkach
- Location within Germany Location within Bavaria
- Coordinates: 49°52′N 10°13′E
- Country: Germany
- State: Bavaria
- Admin. region: Unterfranken
- District: Kitzingen
- Municipal assoc.: Volkach

Government
  - Mayor (2020–26): Heiko Bäuerlein (CSU)

Area
  - Total: 60.19 km^{2} (23.24 sq mi)
- Elevation: 203 m (666 ft)

Population (2025-12-31)
  - Total: 8,450
  - Density: 140/km^{2} (364/sq mi)
- Time zone: UTC+01:00 (CET)
  - Summer (DST): UTC+02:00 (CEST)
- Postal codes: 97332
- Dialling codes: 09381
- Vehicle registration: KT
- Website: volkach.de

Volkach (German pronunciation: [ˈfɔlkax]) is a town in the district of Kitzingen in the Regierungsbezirk Unterfranken (Lower Franconia) in Bavaria, Germany. It lies on the river Main and has a population of around 8,700.

== Notable residents ==
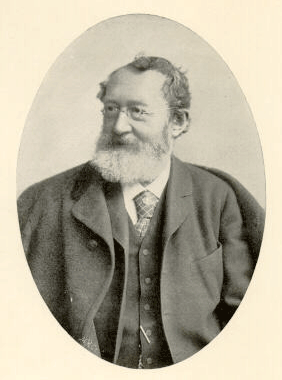
August von Rothmund around 1890

- August von Rothmund (1831–1906), ophthalmologist and professor
- Leo Kirch (1926–2011), media entrepreneur who led the Kirch Group
- Marlies Dumbsky (born 1985), German Wine Queen
- Friedrich Funk (1900–1963), politician (CSU), farmer, and member of the Bundestag 1949–1963 who lived in the town until his death

== Mayors ==
- 1945–1948: Josef Michael Erb
- 1948–1970: Georg Berz
- 1970–1990: Friedrich Ruß
- 1990–2002: Karl Andreas Schlier
- 2002–2020: Peter Kornell, reelected in 2008 and 2014
- since 2020: Heiko Bäuerlein

== Gallery ==
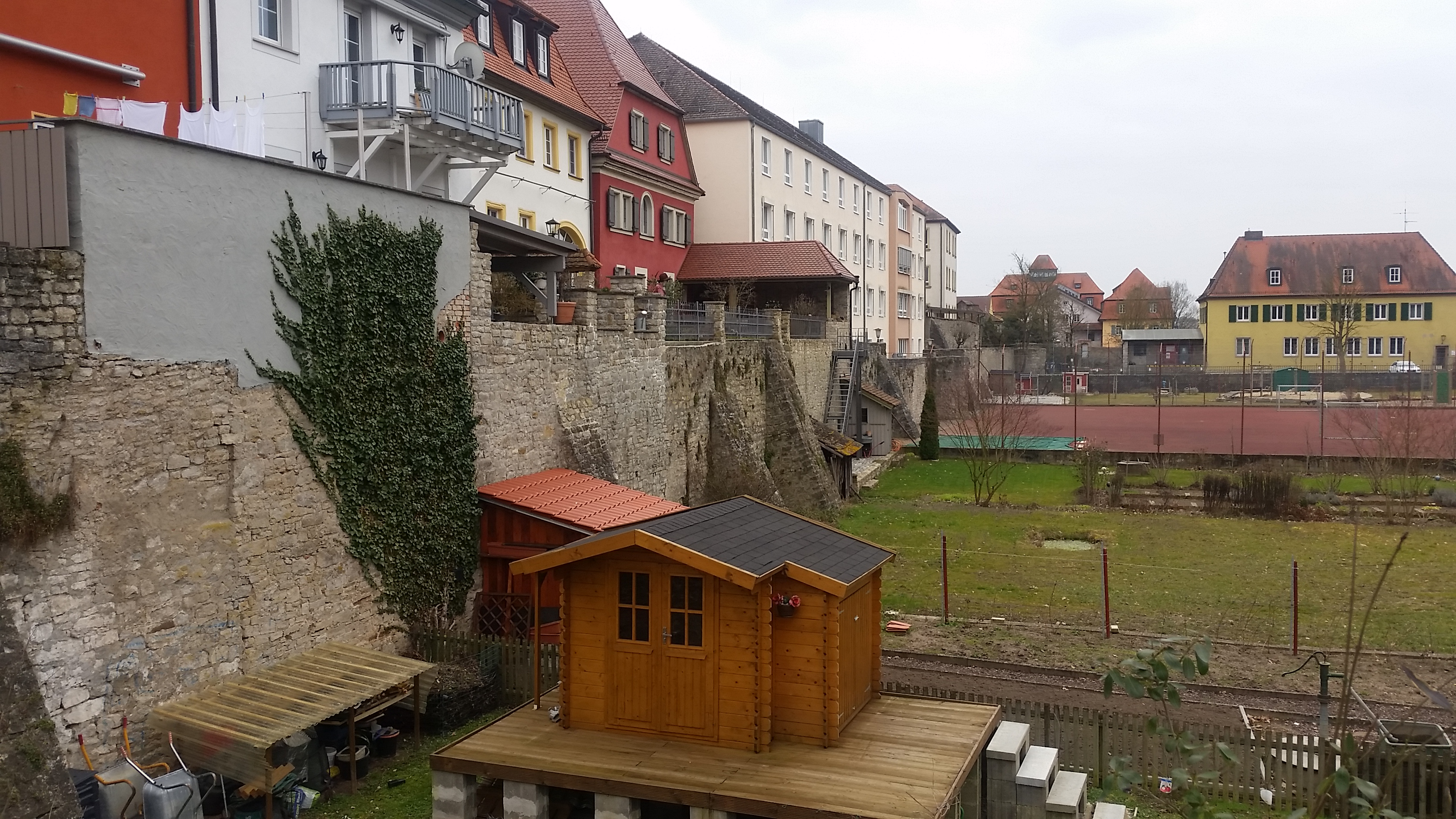
Western town wall remains

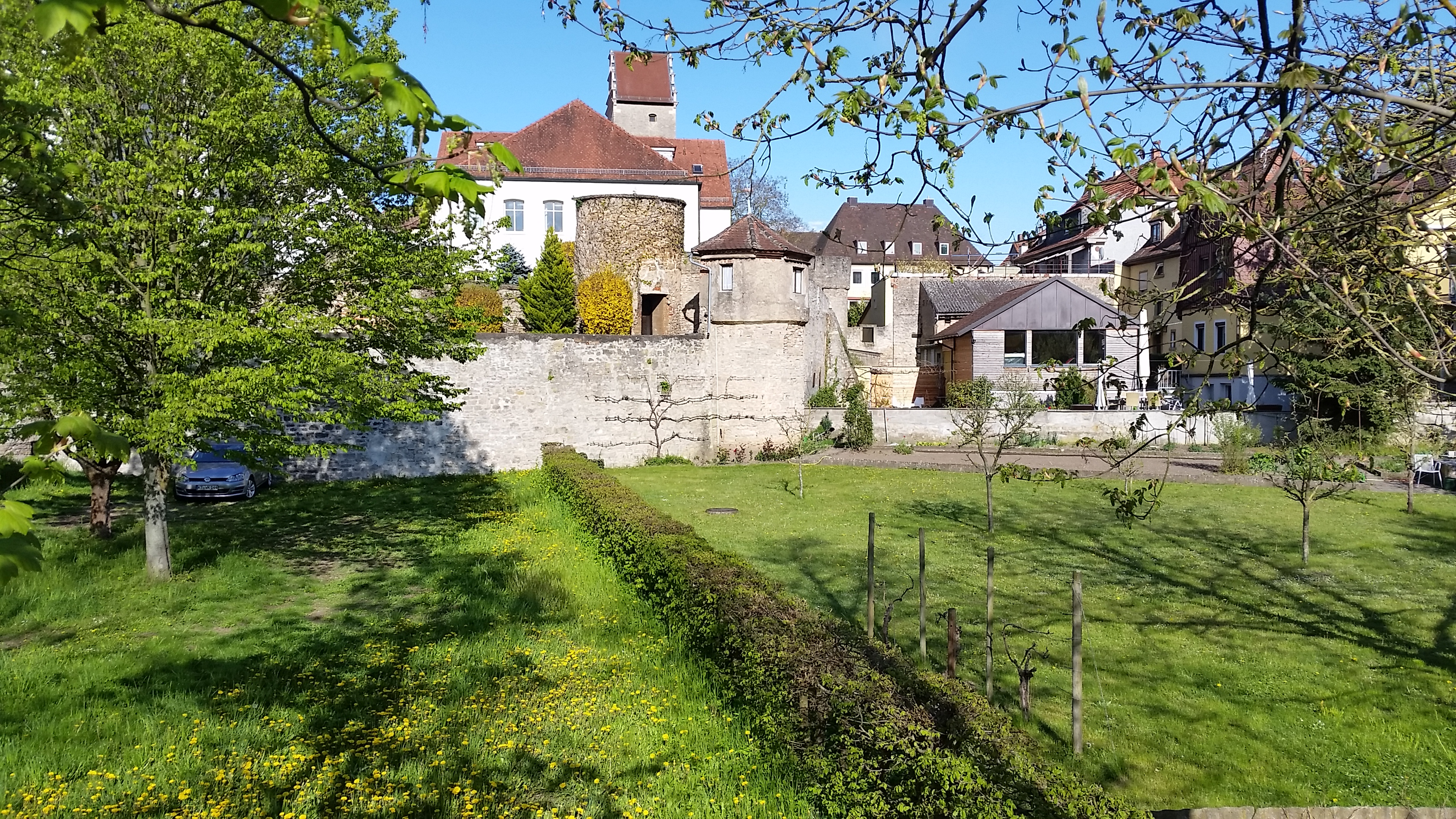
South-western town wall remains

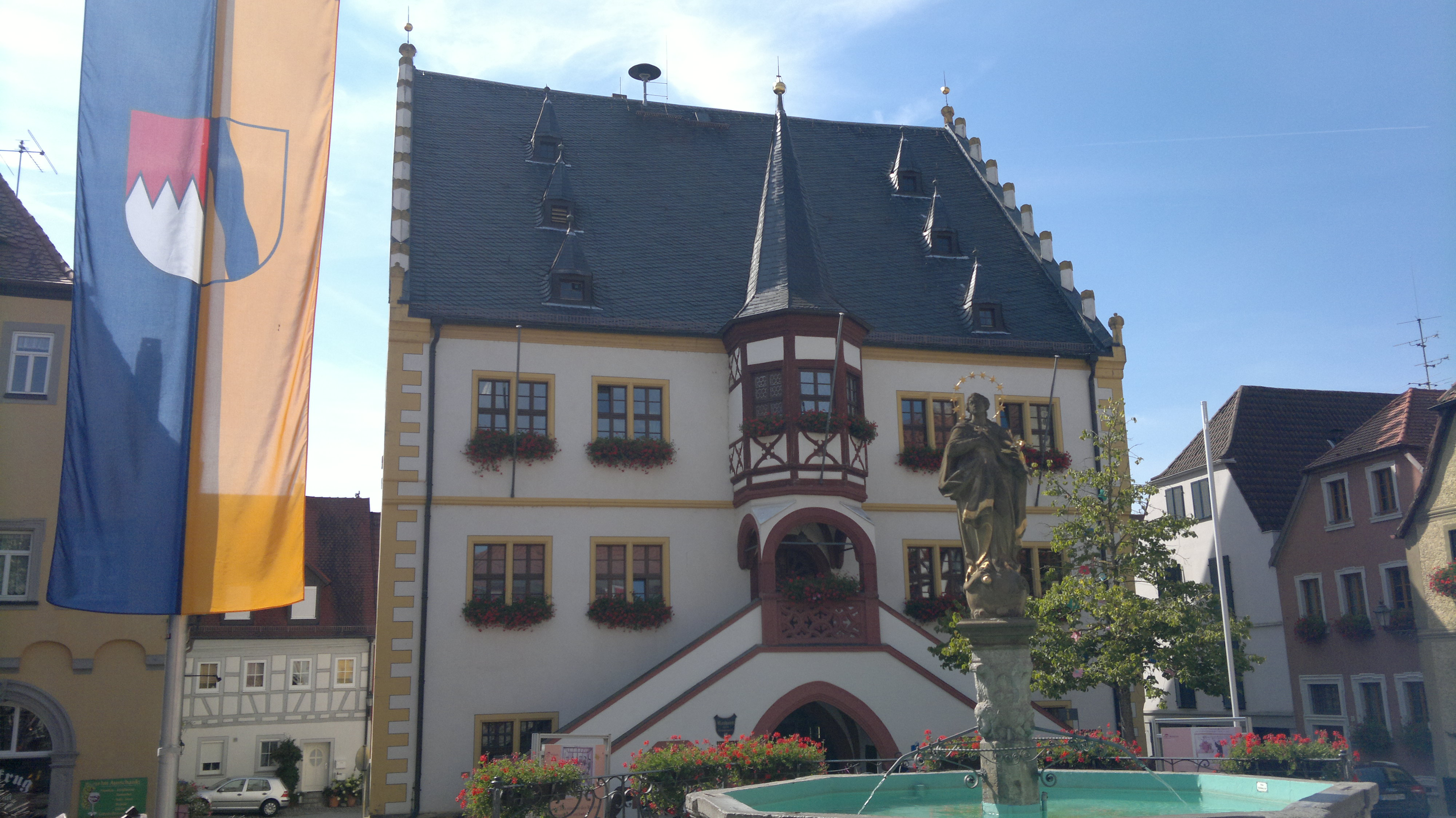
Volkach town hall

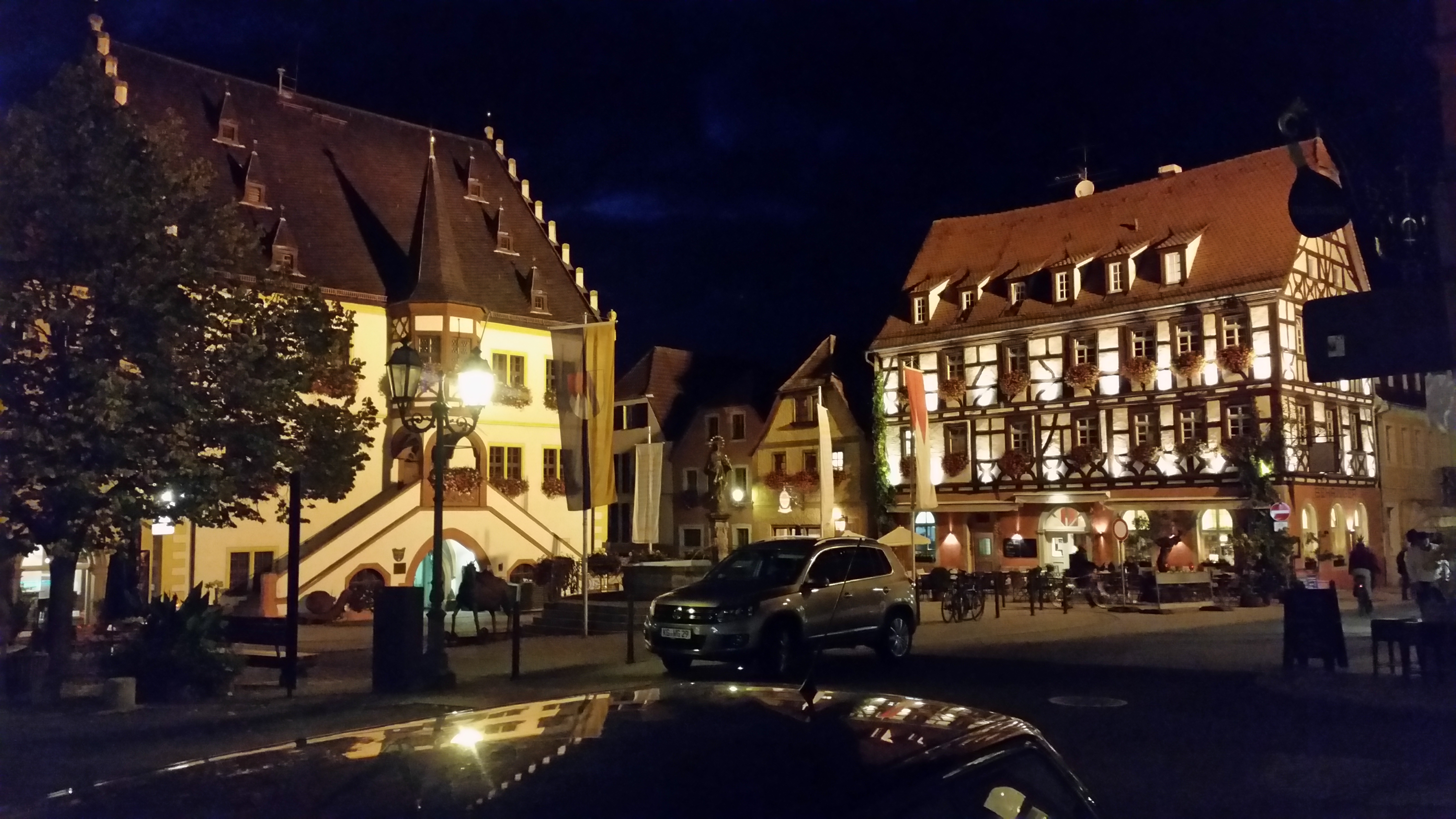
Volkach town centre
