= Wiesenbronn =

- Municipality
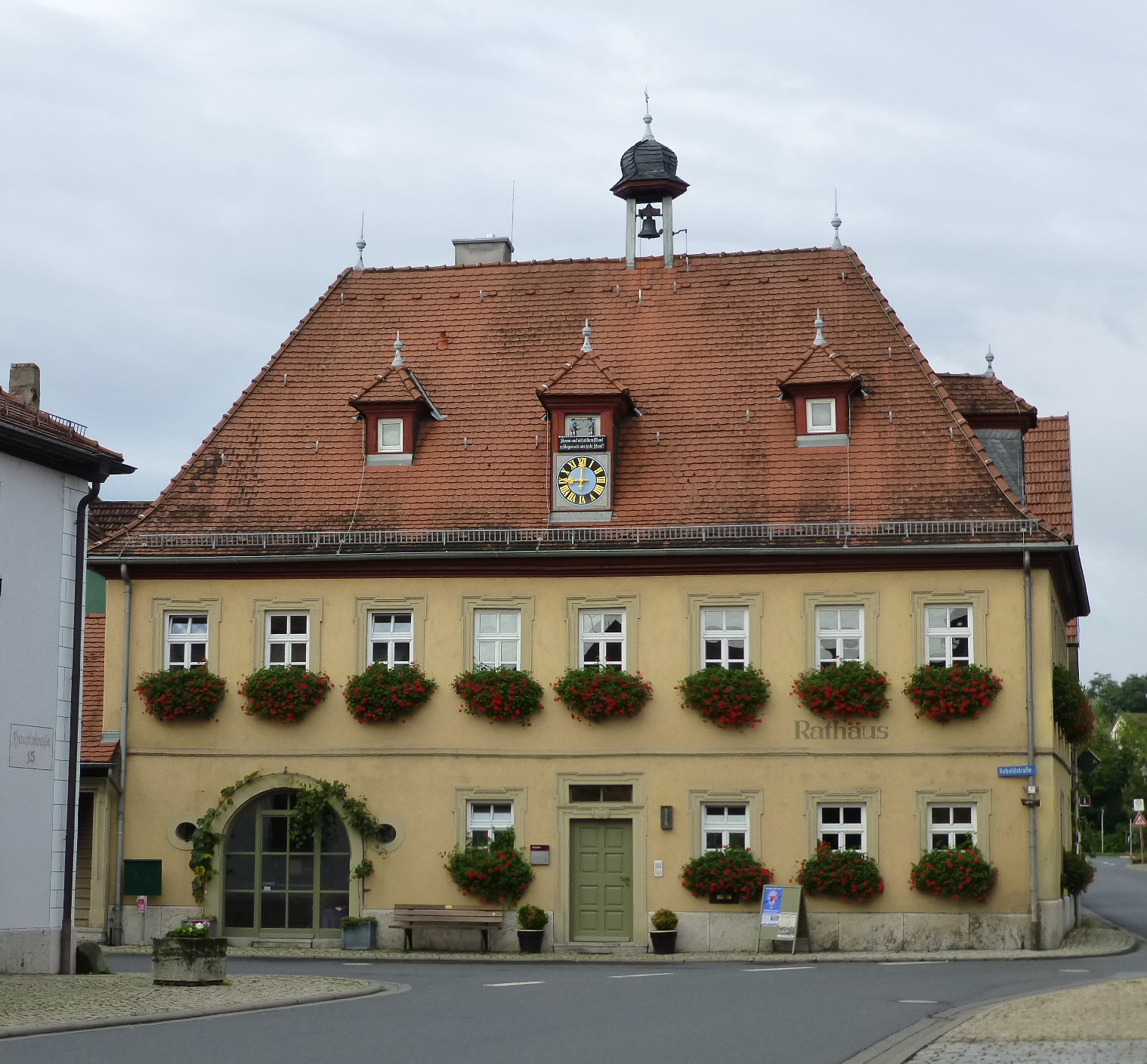
- Town hall

- Coat of arms

- Location of Wiesenbronn within Kitzingen district
- Interactive map of Wiesenbronn
- Location within Germany Location within Bavaria
- Coordinates: 49°45′N 10°18′E
- Country: Germany
- State: Bavaria
- Admin. region: Unterfranken
- District: Kitzingen
- Municipal assoc.: Großlangheim

Government
  - Mayor (2020–26): Volkhard Warmdt

Area
  - Total: 10.57 km^{2} (4.08 sq mi)
- Elevation: 262 m (860 ft)

Population (2025-12-31)
  - Total: 1,086
  - Density: 102.7/km^{2} (266.1/sq mi)
- Time zone: UTC+01:00 (CET)
  - Summer (DST): UTC+02:00 (CEST)
- Postal codes: 97355
- Dialling codes: 09325
- Vehicle registration: KT
- Website: www.wiesenbronn.de

Wiesenbronn is a municipality in the district of Kitzingen in Bavaria in Germany.

== Personalities ==
- Seligman Baer Bamberger, the "Würzburger Rav" (1807–1878), an important representative of orthodox Judaism, was born in Wiesenbronn in Eichenstraße 1 (Oak street 1). A memorial plaque remembers this famous son of Wiesenbronn.
