= Obernbreit =

- Municipality
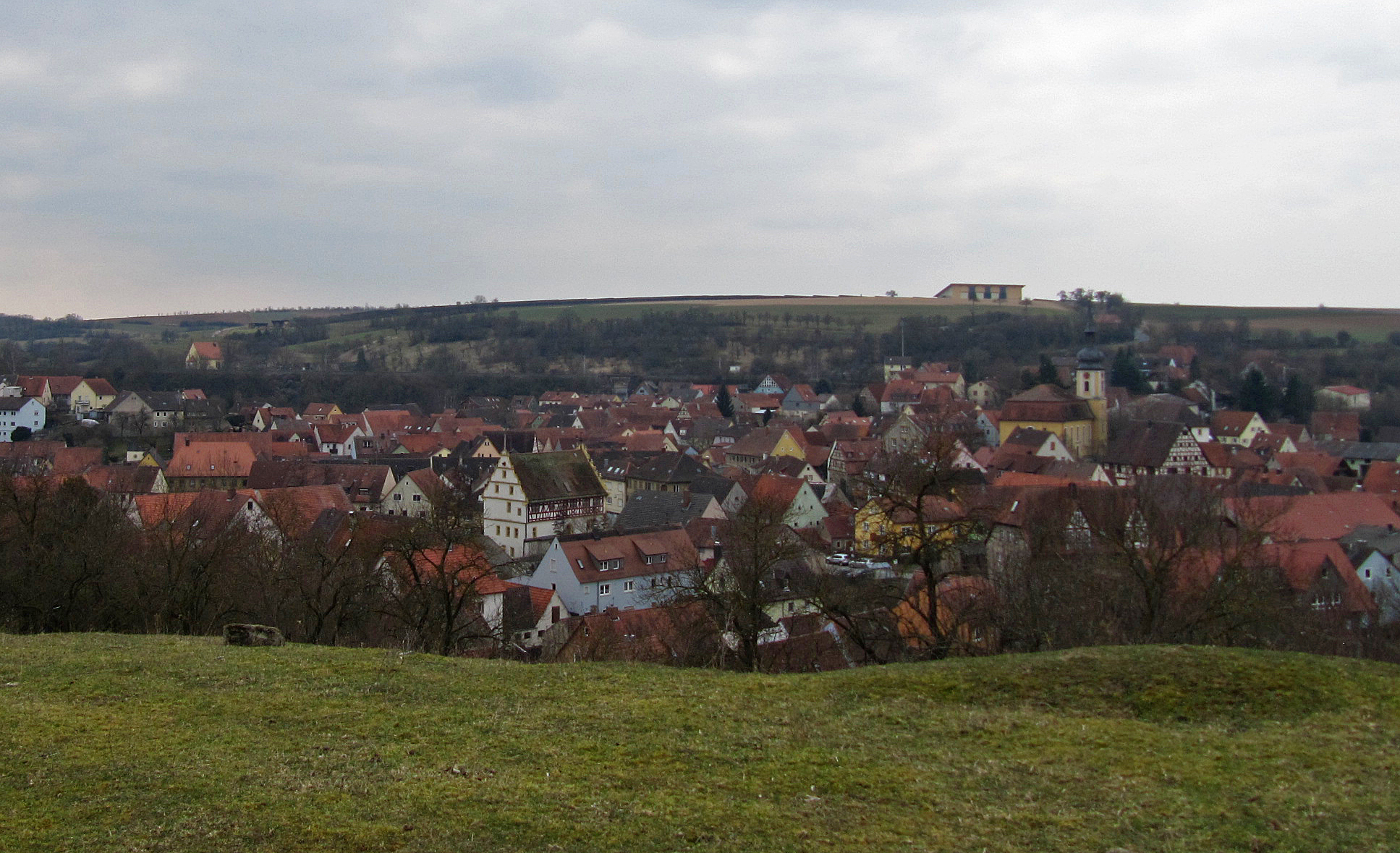
- Obernbreit

- Coat of arms

- Location of Obernbreit within Kitzingen district
- Interactive map of Obernbreit
- Location within Germany Location within Bavaria
- Coordinates: 49°39′N 10°10′E
- Country: Germany
- State: Bavaria
- Admin. region: Unterfranken
- District: Kitzingen
- Municipal assoc.: Marktbreit

Government
  - Mayor (2020–26): Susanne Knof (FW)

Area
  - Total: 9.82 km^{2} (3.79 sq mi)
- Elevation: 202 m (663 ft)

Population (2025-12-31)
  - Total: 1,636
  - Density: 167/km^{2} (431/sq mi)
- Time zone: UTC+01:00 (CET)
  - Summer (DST): UTC+02:00 (CEST)
- Postal codes: 97342
- Dialling codes: 09332
- Vehicle registration: KT
- Website: www.obernbreit.de

Obernbreit is a municipality in the district of Kitzingen in Bavaria in Germany.
