= Rödelsee =

- Municipality
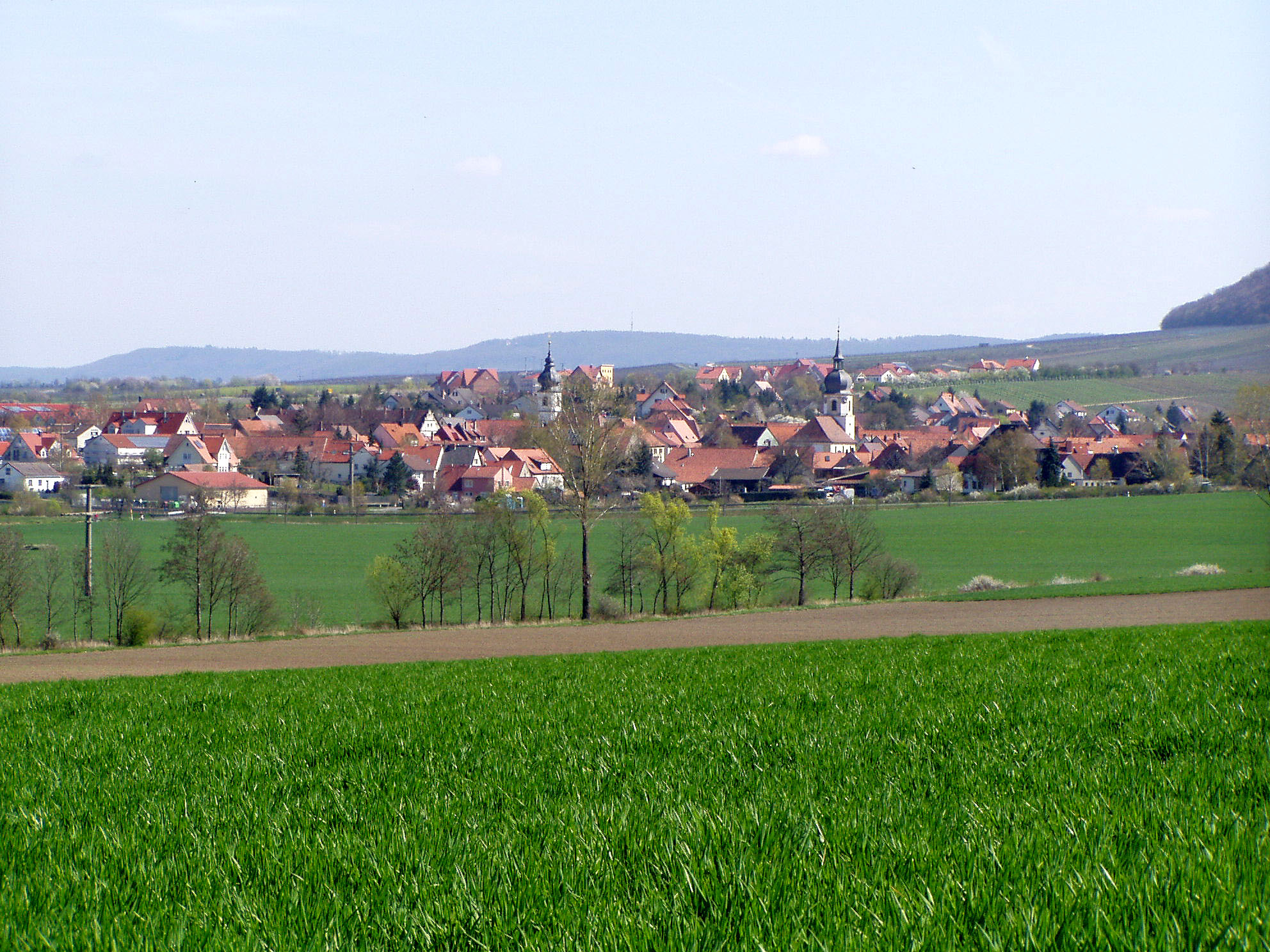
- General view of Rödelsee. Schwanberg in the background.

- Coat of arms

- Location of Rödelsee within Kitzingen district
- Interactive map of Rödelsee
- Location within Germany Location within Bavaria
- Coordinates: 49°44′N 10°15′E
- Country: Germany
- State: Bavaria
- Admin. region: Unterfranken
- District: Kitzingen
- Municipal assoc.: Iphofen

Government
  - Mayor (2020–26): Burkhard Klein (CSU)

Area
  - Total: 11.49 km^{2} (4.44 sq mi)
- Elevation: 236 m (774 ft)

Population (2025-12-31)
  - Total: 2,014
  - Density: 175.3/km^{2} (454.0/sq mi)
- Time zone: UTC+01:00 (CET)
  - Summer (DST): UTC+02:00 (CEST)
- Postal codes: 97348
- Dialling codes: 09323
- Vehicle registration: KT
- Website: www.roedelsee.de

Rödelsee is a municipality in the district of Kitzingen, Lower Franconia, Bavaria, Germany. It's placed near the Schwanberg and is famous for growing wine.

== Famous residents ==
- Paulus Aemilius (c. 1510 - 1575), Hebrew bibliographer and teacher, born in Rödelsee
