= Julius Dreschfeld =

Julius Dreschfeld FRCP
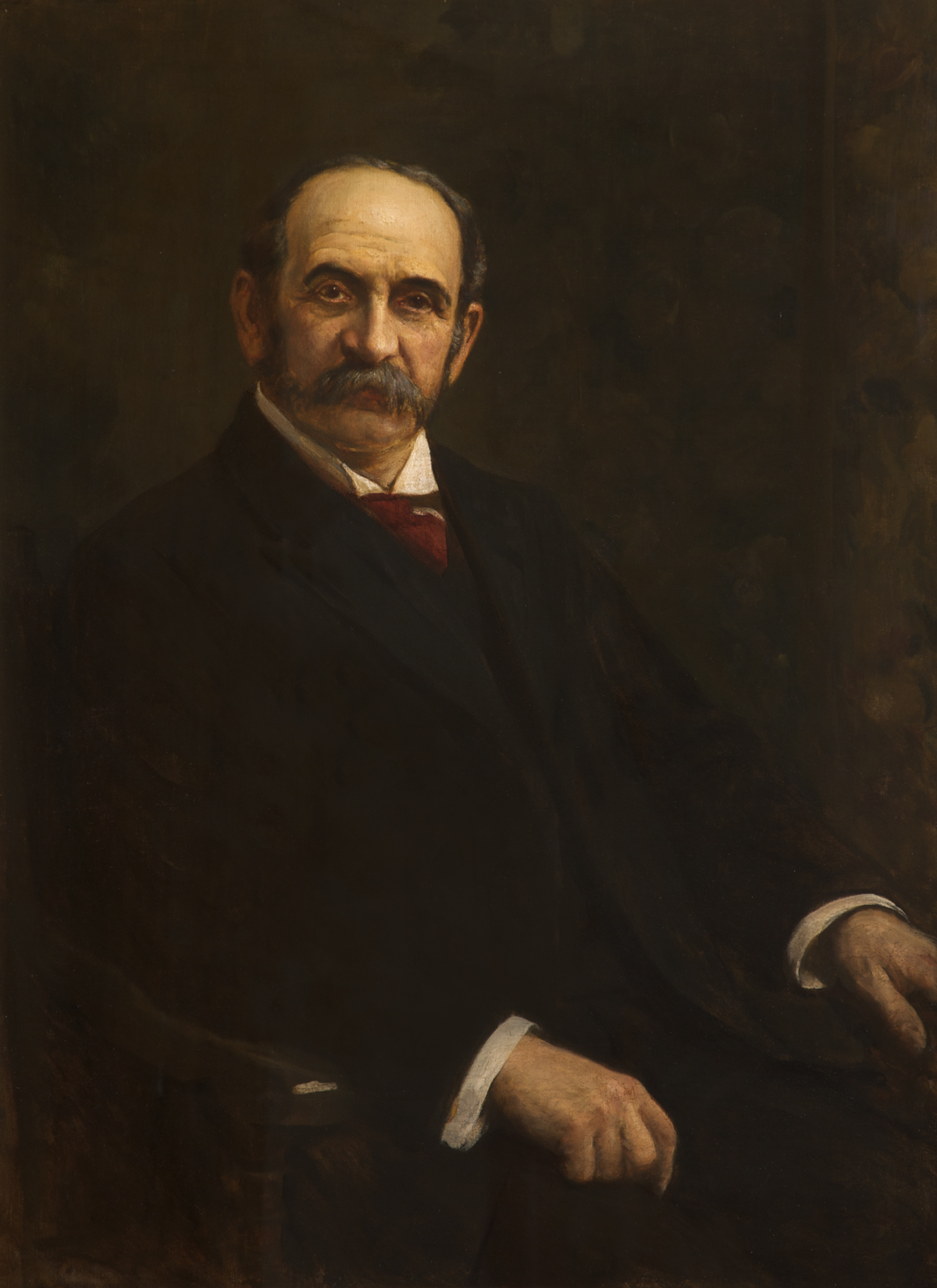
- Born: 13 October 1845; Niederwerrn, German Confederation
- Died: 13 June 1907 (aged 61); Withington, England
- Education: Owens College; Manchester Royal School of Medicine
- Occupations: physician, pathologist.
- Known for: Bradshaw Lecture

Julius Dreschfeld FRCP (13 October 1845 – 13 June 1907) was a leading British physician and pathologist.

== Life ==
Julius Dreschfeld was born as the youngest of ten siblings on 13 October 1845 at Niederwerrn, in the Schweinfurt district of Bavaria. His parents, Samuel and Giedel, were well-off, well-respected Orthodox Jewish people who derived their livelihood from merchanting.

Educated initially at nearby Bamberg, in 1861 Dreschfeld travelled to be with a brother, Leopold, in Manchester, England. He knew little of the English language but continued his studies at Owens College, Manchester and the Manchester Royal School of Medicine. He excelled in chemistry and mathematics, as well as in English, and was influenced by Henry Enfield Roscoe. Dreschfeld then pursued further medical studies at the University of Würzburg from 1864, from where he gained his MD degree in 1867. He served as an assistant surgeon in the Bavarian Army during the brief Austro-Prussian War of 1866.

Returning to Manchester in 1869, Dreschfeld passed his LRCP and began to practise in Broughton. His skills were soon acknowledged and in 1872 he was appointed as an honorary assistant physician at Hulme Dispensary. One year later, he was elected as an honorary assistant physician at Manchester Royal Infirmary, rising to the position of honorary physician upon the retirement of William Roberts in 1883. It was also in 1883 that he was elected FRCP, having been a member since 1875. In 1899, Dreschfeld became honorary senior physician and in 1905 he became the hospital's first honorary consulting physician. This last post enabled him to continue working and teaching at the hospital despite him having reached its official retirement age.

Dreschfeld's work as a teacher had been carried out side-by-side with his practising role. He had a particular interest in the pathology of diseases of the nervous system and had been appointed a lecturer in pathology at the Owens College, Manchester, in 1876 after spending some time overseeing a collection in its medical museum. His appointment as professor of general pathology, morbid anatomy and morbid histology in 1881 was the first of its type in England; he was also in the English vanguard with his approach to the subject, borrowing ideas widely from laboratories throughout Europe and travelling extensively to do so. The outcome was that he established pathology as a significant medical discipline in the country. as well as advancing specific techniques such as staining with eosin. He almost forestalled Louis Pasteur in his researches on hydrophobia during the 1882-1883 rabies epidemic in Manchester. Of the attempts at a rabies vaccine, which entailed injecting infected tissue into rabbits, his biographer, Peter Mohr, has said

[His] work on rabies may have succeeded, but it was never completed because of the Cruelty to Animals Act (1876). He explained in the British Medical Journal (14 August 1886) that the experiments had to be carried out immediately after the death of a rabies victim, and there was never sufficient time to apply for the necessary animal licence. He thought the act was too restrictive, and was holding back medical research in Britain.

The pathology professorship was forsaken for the post of professor of medicine at the university in 1891. He succeeded John Edward Morgan in this role and is unique in having held both chairs. He was also at various times president both of the pathological and medicine sections of the British Medical Association and involved in several other learned associations. These posts demonstrate the breadth of his knowledge as well as the respect in which he was held and, for example, Dreschfeld was also an expert neurologist. He published numerous scientific papers in English and German journals.

He delivered the Bradshaw Lecture to the Royal College of Physicians on Diabetic Coma in 1886. This is recognised as the first exposition of diabetic ketoacidosis.

Dreschfeld had been preparing to fulfil an invitation to give the annual Lumleian Lecture at the time of his death from heart failure on 13 June 1907 at his home in Withington. He had thought that he had been suffering from influenza. There were two sons and two daughters, including the artist Violet Dreschfeld, from his first marriage with Selina Gaspari; he had married Ethel Lilley in 1905, a year after Selina's death. He had converted from Judaism to Anglicanism and was buried at Holy Trinity, Southport.
