= Noth =

Noth is a German surname. Notable people with the surname include:

- Chris Noth (born 1954), American film and television actor
- Martin Noth (1902–1968), German scholar of the Hebrew Bible
- Winfried Nöth (born 1944), German linguist and semiotician
