= Reichmannshausen =

- Village of Schonungen
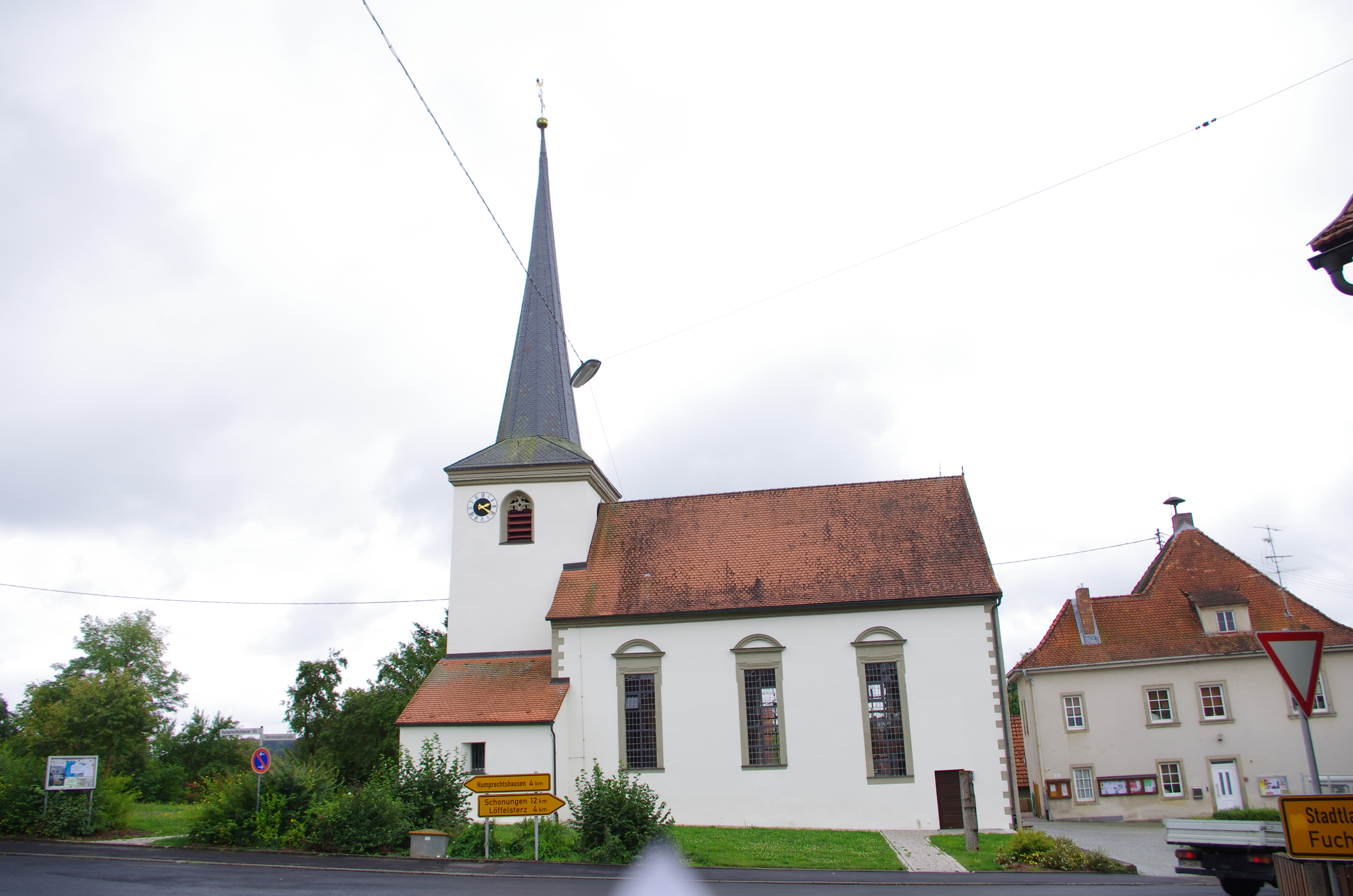
- Church of Saint George
- Interactive map of Reichmannshausen
- Location within Germany Location within Bavaria
- Coordinates: 50°07′N 10°23′E
- Country: Germany
- State: Bavaria
- Admin. region: Lower Franconia
- District: Schweinfurt
- Municipality: Schonungen
- Elevation: 341 m (1,119 ft)

Population
  - Total: 485
- Time zone: UTC+01:00 (CET)
  - Summer (DST): UTC+02:00 (CEST)
- Vehicle registration: SW

Reichmannshausen in Unterfranken is a little village in the municipality of Schonungen, in Schweinfurt district, Bavaria. It has about 491 inhabitants.

== Location ==
Reichmannshausen is located 341 meters above sea level on the Schlettach plateau. It is completely surrounded by forest, most of which is state owned.

The Frankish style homesteads are in a widespread arrangement with exposed timber-framed construction. The pointed steeple of the St. George church towers above the village. Two small streams, one of which is dammed north at the village pond, merge southwest of the church to form the Ried stream on which a mill is located. Further east there is a new residential development located on the Ottersee (Otter lake) which was formerly a vacation cottage area.

== History ==
Reichmannshausen was developed from a clearing in the land of the neighboring Wettringen royal manor, to which it belonged until 1804.

The earliest known reference to the village notes a "Richalmeshusen" (houses of Richalm) and comes from a 1290 deed, which mentions that it was the seat of the Mariaburghausen cloister.

By 1522, there were already 34 houses around the original Richalm farmstead. The village passed hands several more times: the House of Henneberg owned Reichmannshausen until the family became extinct in 1583. The village then passed to the Bishopric of Würzburg followed by a short rule by the Grand Duke of Tuscany from 1803 to 1804, and then became part of the Kingdom of Bavaria in 1814.

In 1631, during the Thirty Years' War, the Protestant army of Gustavus Adolphus of Sweden came to the aid of German Lutherans in the region. Liborius Wagner was a Catholic priest in the parish of Sulzdorf. He fled from the invading forces five kilometers away to Reichmannshausen where he hid in the local schoolhouse. Protestant soldiers tracked him down and he was taken to the nearby Mainberg castle. The soldiers tried to force him to renounce his Catholic faith. Wagner refused; when asked if he was still Catholic, he replied, "I live, I suffer, and I die a papal Catholic." After five days of torture, he died on 9 December 1631. His body was thrown into the nearby Main River. He was beatified by the Catholic church on March 24, 1974.

Between the World Wars, Reichmannshausen was known as a “forest air health resort” due to its remoteness, tranquility, and dense forest. The village had a regular motor coach service to Schweinfurt.

== Name ==
In its current form the English translation is "Rich Man's City"; however, the name has Frankish origins. An early settler named Richalm most likely gave name to the village "Richalmeshusen" or “houses of Richalm" as it appears in a 1290 deed. There was a lot of variation in the spelling of the village over the years. For example, a 1771 map shows the name "Reichenmanshausen" and a 1778 map shows the spelling "Reichinmannshausen".

== Places of interest ==
- Catholic Church of St. George. Built in "Choir Tower" style. Little is known about the first St. George church. During the lifetime of Julius Echter von Mespelbrunn (1545-1617) the steeple was raised in “Echter style" in 1607. The nave was rebuilt at the end of the seventeenth century. It has side altars, a baptismal font (circa 1600), and the a Baroque pulpit (circa 1722), which was taken from the former Benedictine monastery Theres Abbey in the nearby village of Theres when it was demolished in 1809.
- World War I Memorial. Built in 1928.
- St. John's Chapel
- Old Schoolhouse. Next to the church is the old school, which now houses a medical practice. A new, modern schoolhouse with two lecture halls, gymnasium, and side rooms was established in 1965. It is now falls under the Schweinfurt school district and is used as a school camp.
- Hiking trails. There are many marked hiking trails leading from parking lots in the surrounding forest that are easily accessible and frequently used.
- School camp.
- Ellertshäuser Lake Recreation area

== Transport ==
Despite its remoteness, Reichmannshausen is well situated in the local transportation network. Country road SW 4 connects with state road 2266 at Löffelsterz and state highway 2281 at Wettringen and Country Road SW 5 connects with state road 2280 to the west at Thomashof and state road 2266 to the East in Humprechtshausen.

== Notable people ==
- Robert "Robbi" Hofmann. Head physician of the Department of Obstetrics and Gynecology at the Leopoldina Hospital in Schweinfurt. Author of Reichmannshausen and Me. Childhood Memories, Schonungen, 1990.
