= Forst (Unterfranken) =

- Village of Schonungen
- Main street of Forst, looking towards church

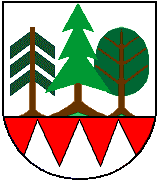
- Coat of arms
- Interactive map of Forst
- Location within Germany Location within Bavaria
- Coordinates: 50°02′22″N 10°19′47″E
- Country: Germany
- State: Bavaria
- Admin. region: Lower Franconia
- District: Schweinfurt
- Municipality: Schonungen

Area
  - Total: 6.31 km^{2} (2.44 sq mi)
- Elevation: 217–343 m (712–1,125 ft)

Population (2011)
  - Total: 870
  - Density: 140/km^{2} (360/sq mi)
- Time zone: UTC+01:00 (CET)
  - Summer (DST): UTC+02:00 (CEST)
- Postal codes: 97453
- Dialling codes: 09727
- Vehicle registration: SW

Forst (German pronunciation: [fɔʁst]) in Unterfranken is a little village in the Schonungen municipality that lies in the district of Schweinfurt. It has about 900 inhabitants.

== Location ==
Forst lies approximately 1/2 mile just north of the Main river along the southern exposed north bank of the Main river valley. At 923 ft (284m) above sea level, it is about 227 ft (70m) above the river. Many new houses have been built, except in the old village center, due to the great view into the valley. The expansion predominantly took place to the west towards Schonungen.

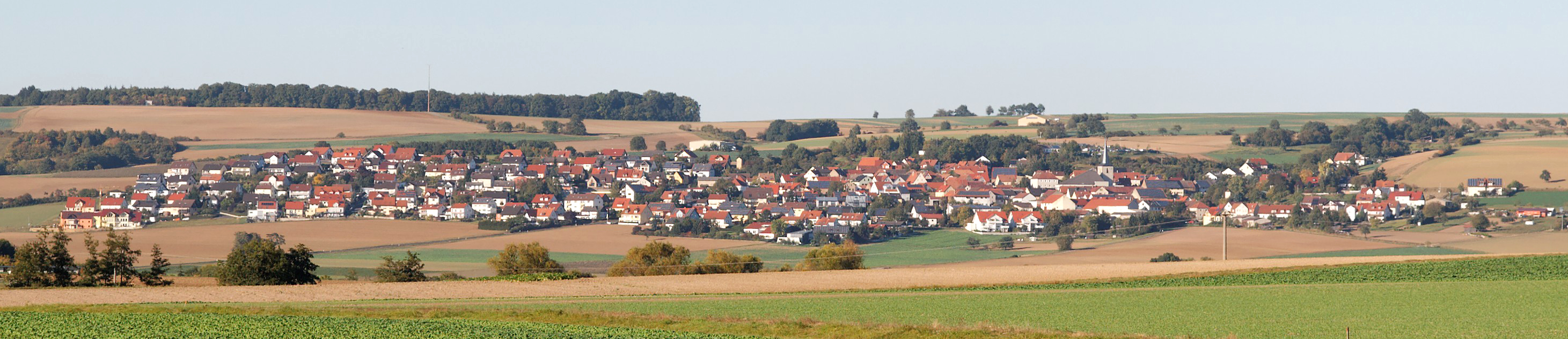
Forst, as seen from Weyer across the Main River.

== History ==
The village is first documented in the year 1183. The village was formed as a part of the free imperial city of Schweinfurt which was later given to the Count of Henneberg. During the Margravian War in 1553 and the Thirty Years' War the area suffered heavily.

== Objects of Interest ==
Forst's main landmarks include:

- The old tithe house from the year 1567 and other fachwerk (Tudor-type) houses along the old roads which meet in the village center at the park
- The war memorial and above it the natural stone spring in the village center park
- St. Godehard catholic church
- Boten-Steig Arena (soccer field) of the Forst sports club
- Part of the old village wall in the rear church courtyard

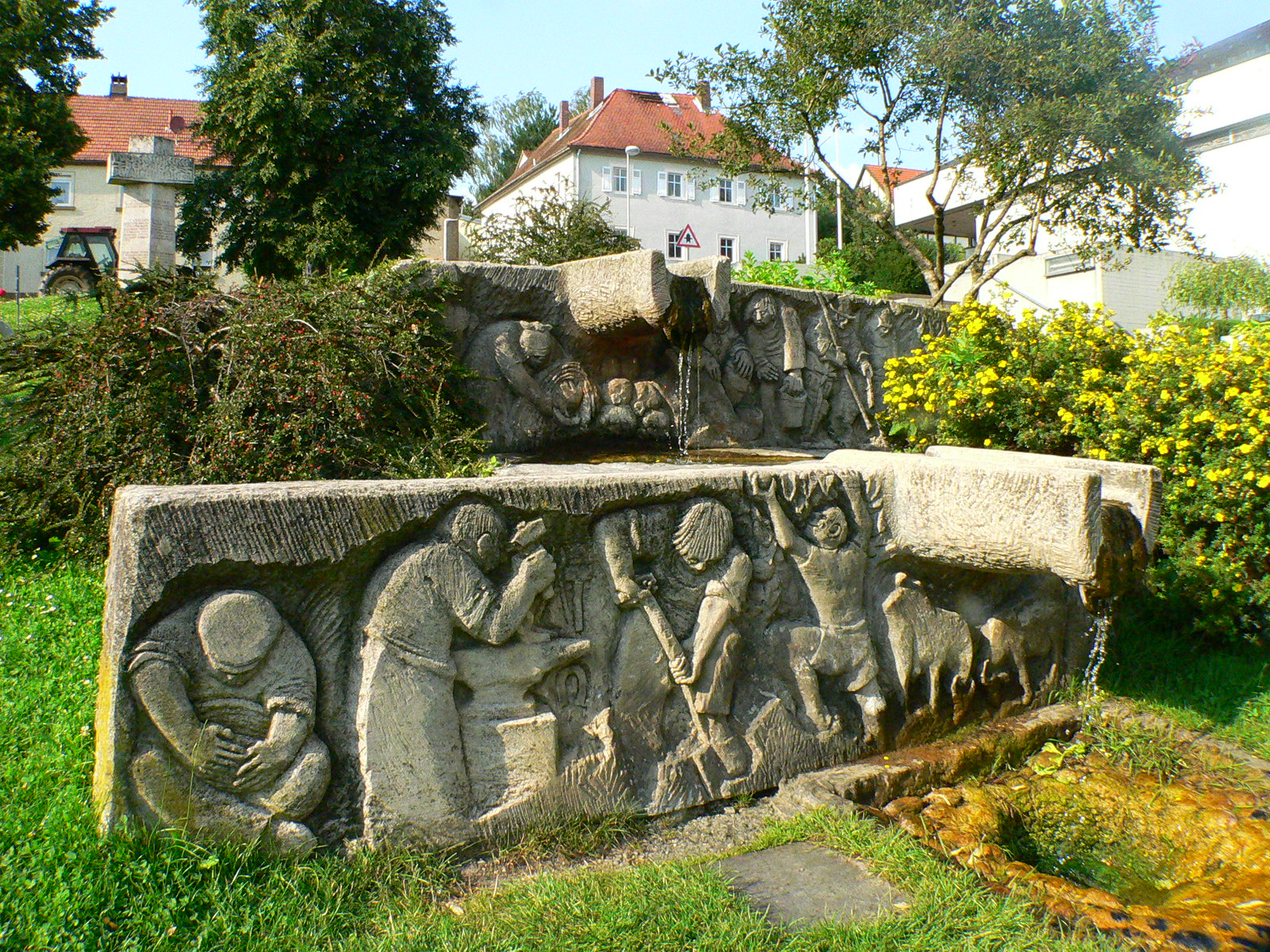
Park spring in Forst

== Events ==
- Annual
  - Knutfest of the Forst sports club
  - Karneval of Forst
  - Parish fest
  - Party-Weekend of the Forst sports club
  - Church fest

== Economy ==
- Wheat, rye, oats, rapeseed, beets, corn, and asparagus are cultivated in the surrounding fields
- The cherries from Forst are well known within the region
- Northeast, between Forst and Waldsachsen, are eleven wind turbines which produce 1 or 2.3 megawatts of electricity each
- There are two family-run restaurants and one night club located in town

== Traffic ==
Forst is connected by county road, SW23, to state road B26. Likewise, buslines 8130 (Schweinfurt-Aidhausen) and 8156 (Schweinfurt-Hassfurt) of the Franconia Public Bus Transportation (OVF-Omnibusverkehr Franken) ensure good trafficability in all directions.
