= Wipfeld =

- Municipality
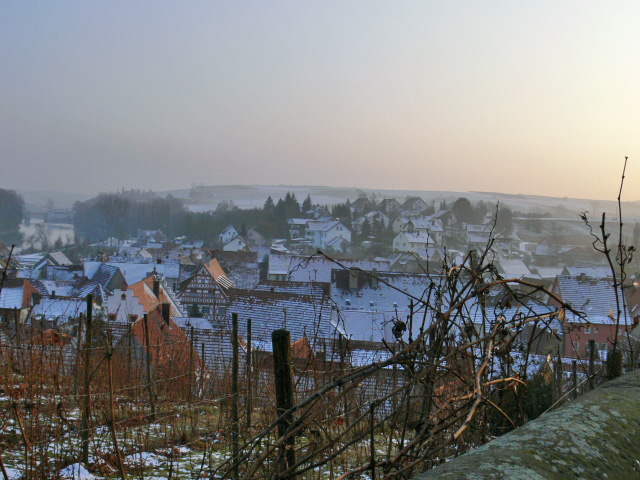
- Wipfeld in winter

- Coat of arms

- Location of Wipfeld within Schweinfurt district
- Interactive map of Wipfeld
- Location within Germany Location within Bavaria
- Coordinates: 49°55′N 10°10′E
- Country: Germany
- State: Bavaria
- Admin. region: Unterfranken
- District: Schweinfurt
- Municipal assoc.: Schwanfeld

Government
  - Mayor (2020–26): Tobias Blesch

Area
  - Total: 5.24 km^{2} (2.02 sq mi)
- Elevation: 225 m (738 ft)

Population (2025-12-31)
  - Total: 963
  - Density: 184/km^{2} (476/sq mi)
- Time zone: UTC+01:00 (CET)
  - Summer (DST): UTC+02:00 (CEST)
- Postal codes: 97537
- Dialling codes: 09384
- Vehicle registration: SW
- Website: www.wipfeld.de

Wipfeld is a municipality in the district of Schweinfurt in Bavaria, Germany.

== Twin towns ==
Wipfeld is twinned with:

- Follina, Italy
