= Pia Beckmann =

German politician

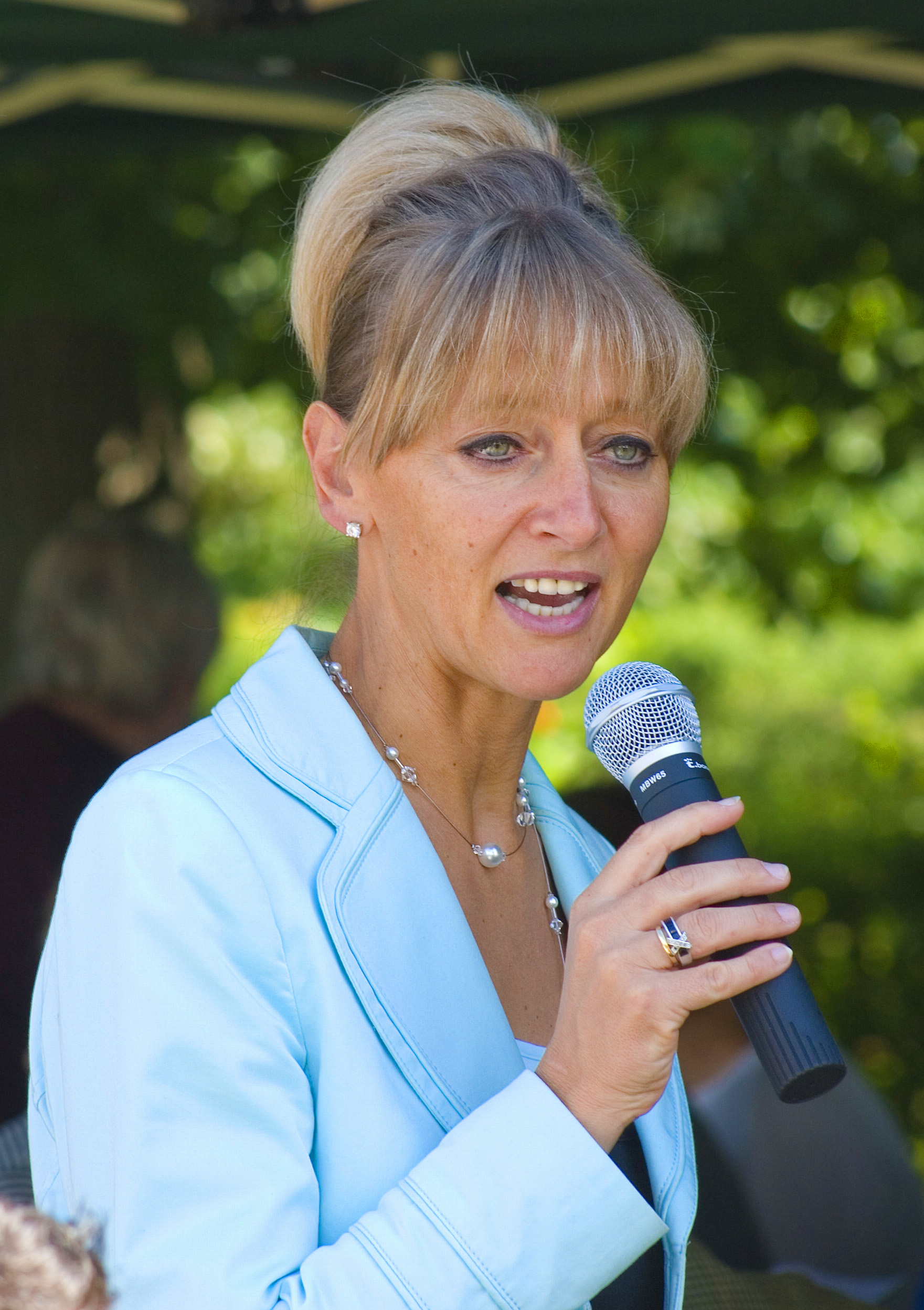

Pia Beckmann (born 14 May 1963 in Gerolzhofen, Bavaria) is a doctor of philology, was a German politician, representative of the Christian Social Union of Bavaria and an entrepreneur.

In 2002 she was elected as mayor (Oberbürgermeisterin) of Würzburg as the first woman in Würzburg's history. In 2008 the CSU again sent her as its candidate for mayorship, with a majority of 93%. She was one of five candidates and won the first ballot with 41,3 %, which was more than 16% better than the next candidate of the Social Democratic Party (SPD). In the second ballot, which was to be held between the two with the most votes, she only could cast 47,5 % of the votes and by this lost the run-off. In 2008 Beckmann founded her own consulting firm. In 2010 she became shareholder and managing partner of the company clean energy GmbH. Beside that, she was a lecturer at the University of Würzburg, Faculty of Business Administration and Business Informatics, from 2008 to 2012. She is married with Klaus Hiltrop and has four children.

== See also ==
- List of Bavarian Christian Social Union politicians
