= Kolitzheim =

- Municipality
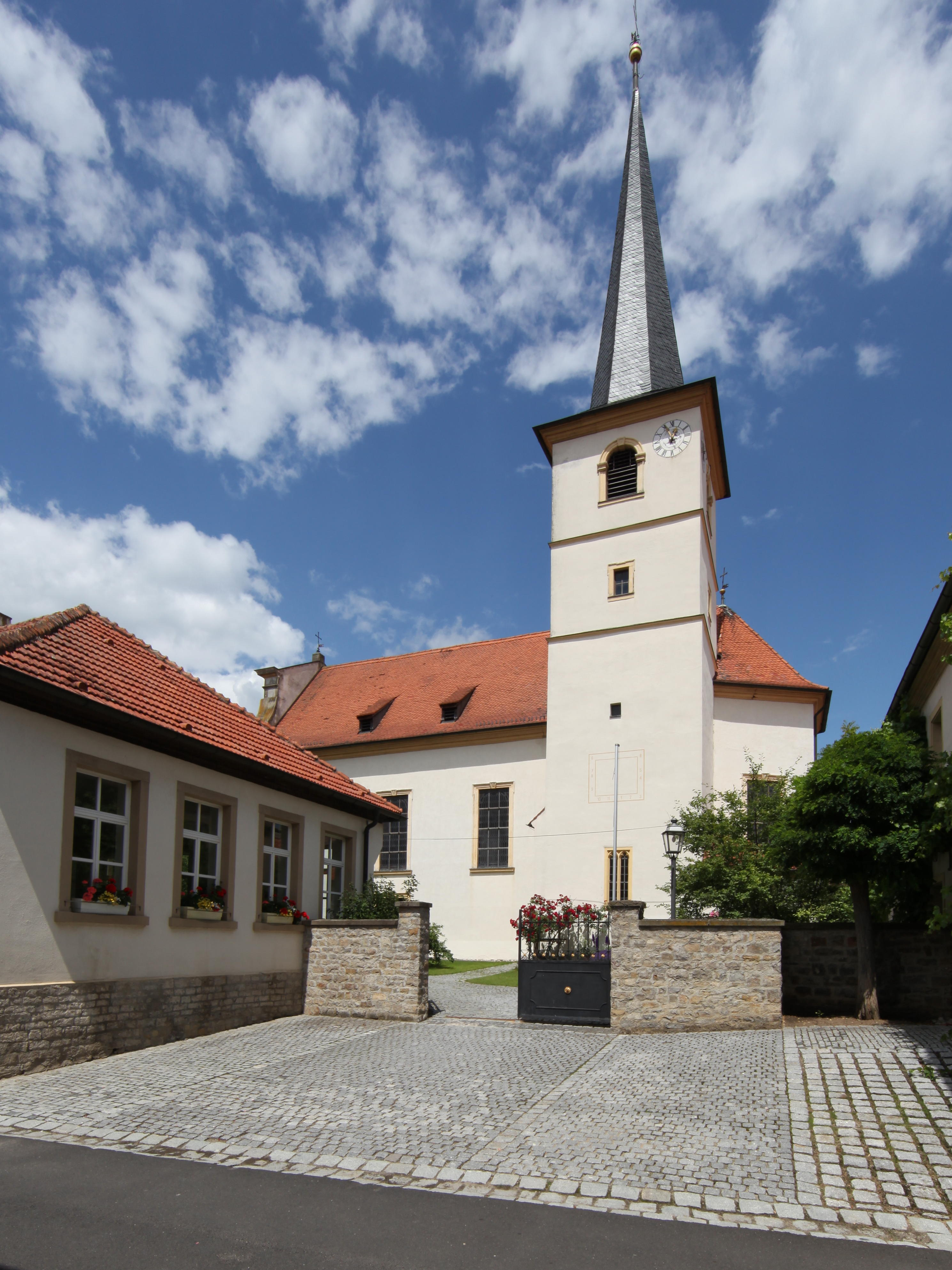
- Church of Saint Stephen

- Coat of arms

- Location of Kolitzheim within Schweinfurt district
- Interactive map of Kolitzheim
- Location within Germany Location within Bavaria
- Coordinates: 49°55′N 10°14′E
- Country: Germany
- State: Bavaria
- Admin. region: Unterfranken
- District: Schweinfurt

Government
  - Mayor (2020–26): Horst Herbert (CSU)

Area
  - Total: 59.02 km^{2} (22.79 sq mi)
- Elevation: 229 m (751 ft)

Population (2025-12-31)
  - Total: 5,663
  - Density: 95.95/km^{2} (248.5/sq mi)
- Time zone: UTC+01:00 (CET)
  - Summer (DST): UTC+02:00 (CEST)
- Postal codes: 97509
- Dialling codes: 09385 / 09381 / 09723
- Vehicle registration: SW
- Website: www.kolitzheim.de

Kolitzheim is a municipality in the district of Schweinfurt in Bavaria, Germany.
