= Sulzheim, Bavaria =

Sulzheim
- Municipality
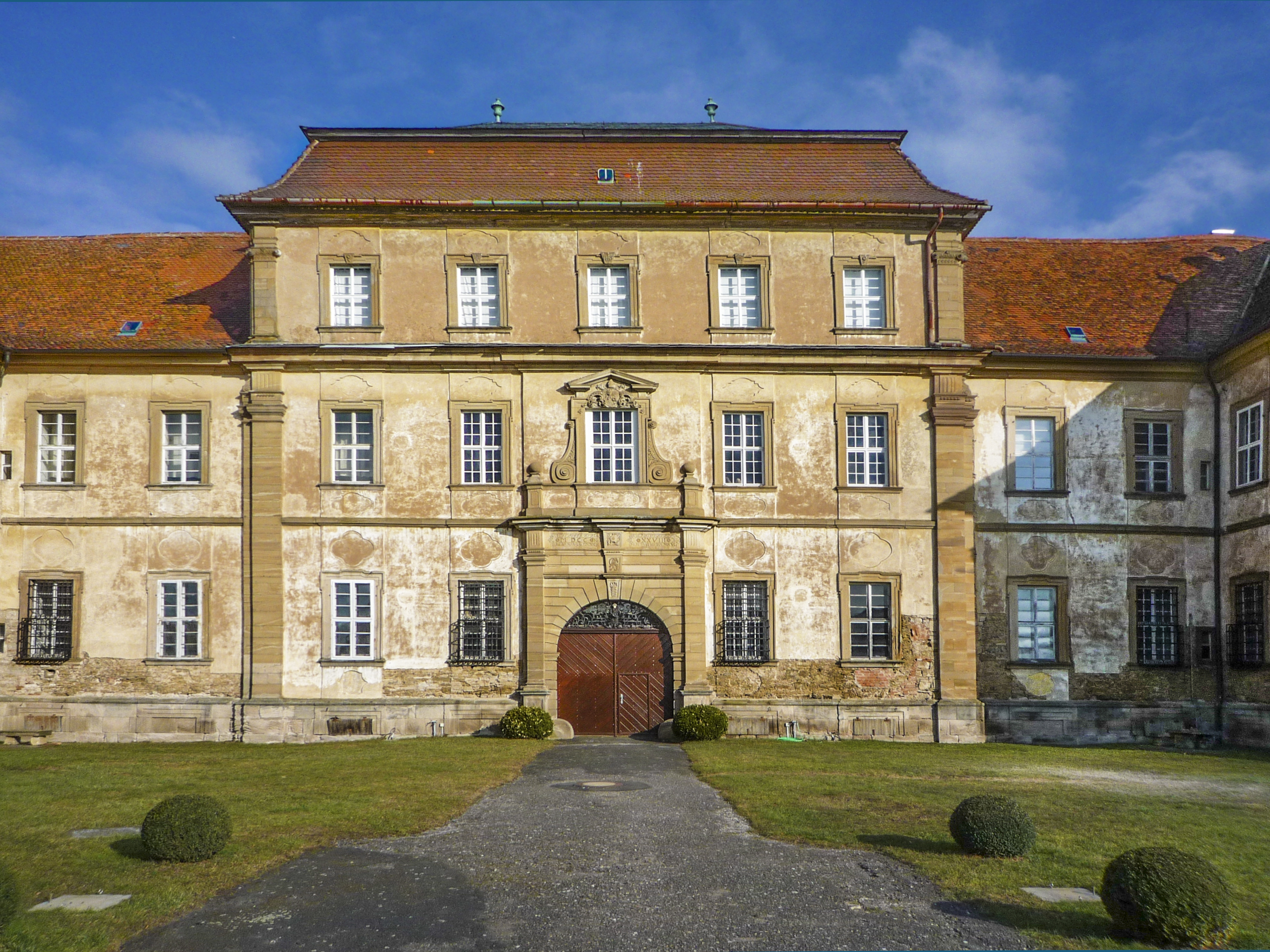
- Sulzheim Castle

- Coat of arms

- Location of Sulzheim within Schweinfurt district
- Interactive map of Sulzheim
- Location within Germany Location within Bavaria
- Coordinates: 49°57′N 10°20′E
- Country: Germany
- State: Bavaria
- Admin. region: Unterfranken
- District: Schweinfurt
- Municipal assoc.: Gerolzhofen

Government
  - Mayor (2020–26): Jürgen Schwab

Area
  - Total: 26.78 km^{2} (10.34 sq mi)
- Elevation: 227 m (745 ft)

Population (2025-12-31)
  - Total: 2,029
  - Density: 75.77/km^{2} (196.2/sq mi)
- Time zone: UTC+01:00 (CET)
  - Summer (DST): UTC+02:00 (CEST)
- Postal codes: 97529
- Dialling codes: 09382
- Vehicle registration: SW
- Website: www.sulzheim.de

Sulzheim (German pronunciation: [ˈzʊltshaɪm]) is a municipality in the district of Schweinfurt in Bavaria, Germany.

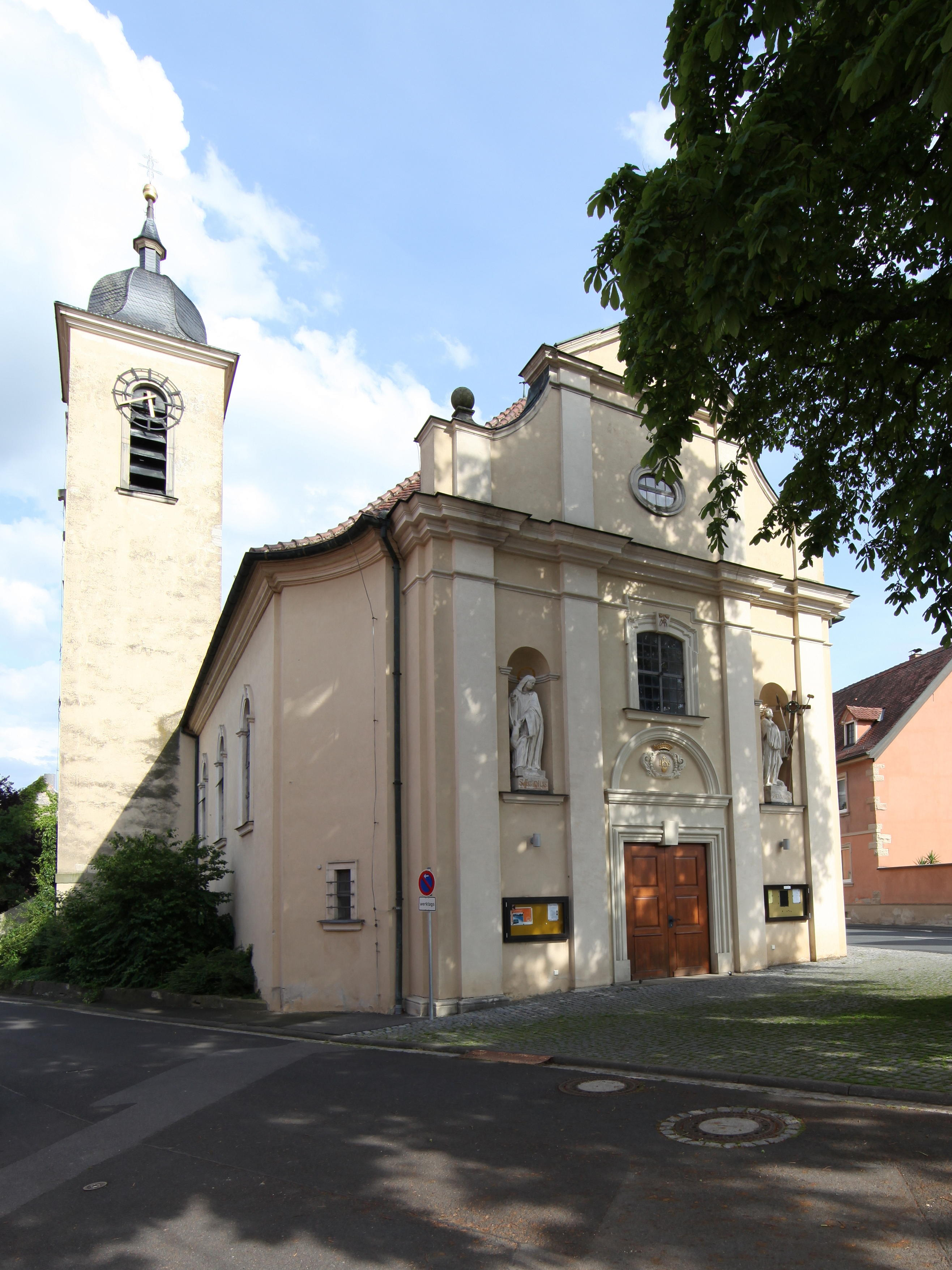
A church in Sulzheim

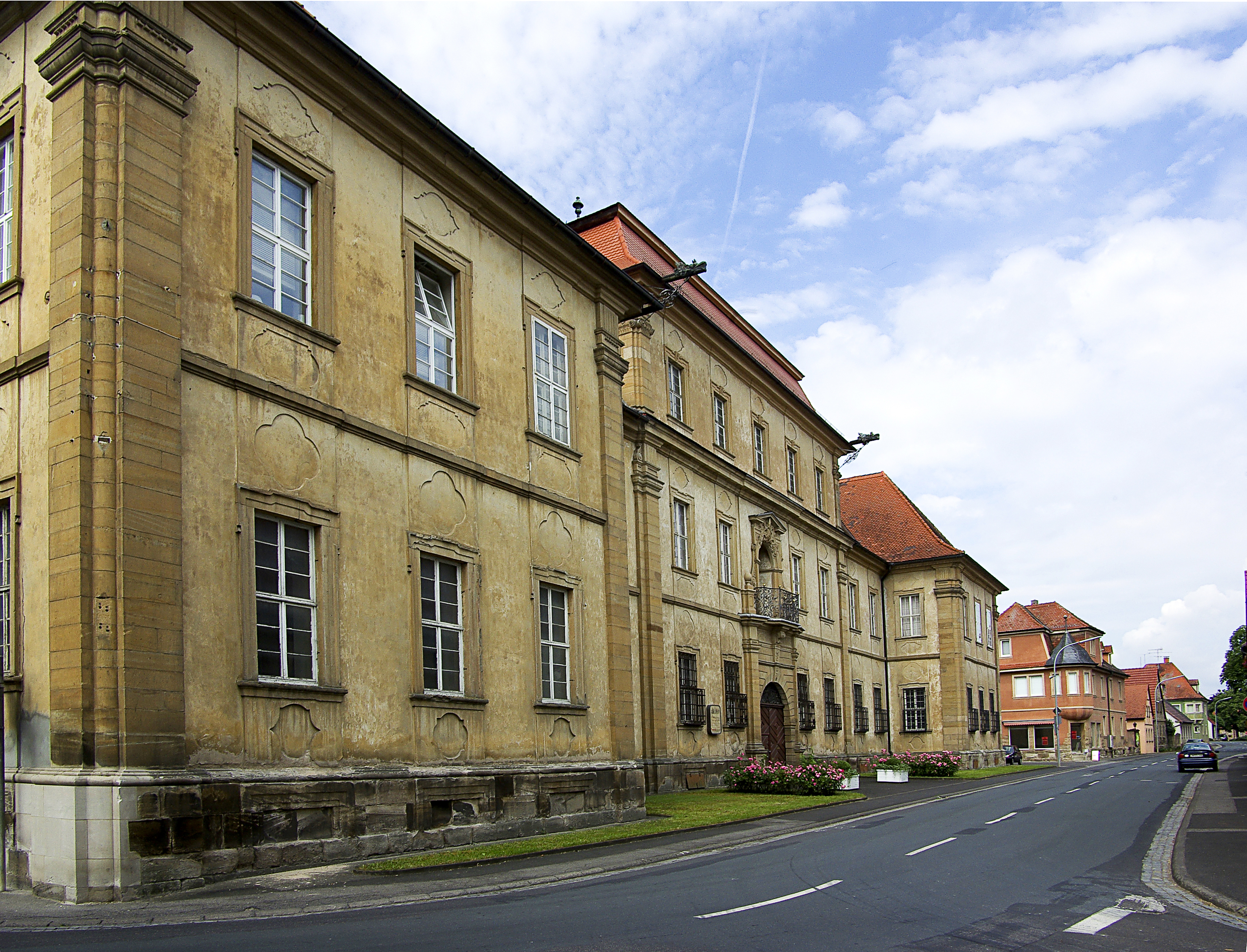
Buildings in Sulzheim
