= Violet Dreschfeld =

British artist

Violet Jennie Dreschfeld
- Born: 1890; Chorlton, Manchester
- Died: 1975 (aged 84–85)
- Known for: Sculpture

Violet Jennie Dreschfeld (1890–1975) was a British artist known for her portrait sculptures.

== Biography ==
Dreschfeld was born and grew up in the Chorlton suburb of Manchester, one of three children to Selina and Julius Dreschfeld, a German-born physician, who became a Professor of Pathology. Violet Dreschfeld studied sculpture in London, where she was based in the 1910s. She was active throughout that decade producing portrait busts, particularly of female subjects. From 1929 she began exhibiting at the Société Nationale des Beaux-Arts in Paris.
