= Sennfeld =

- Municipality
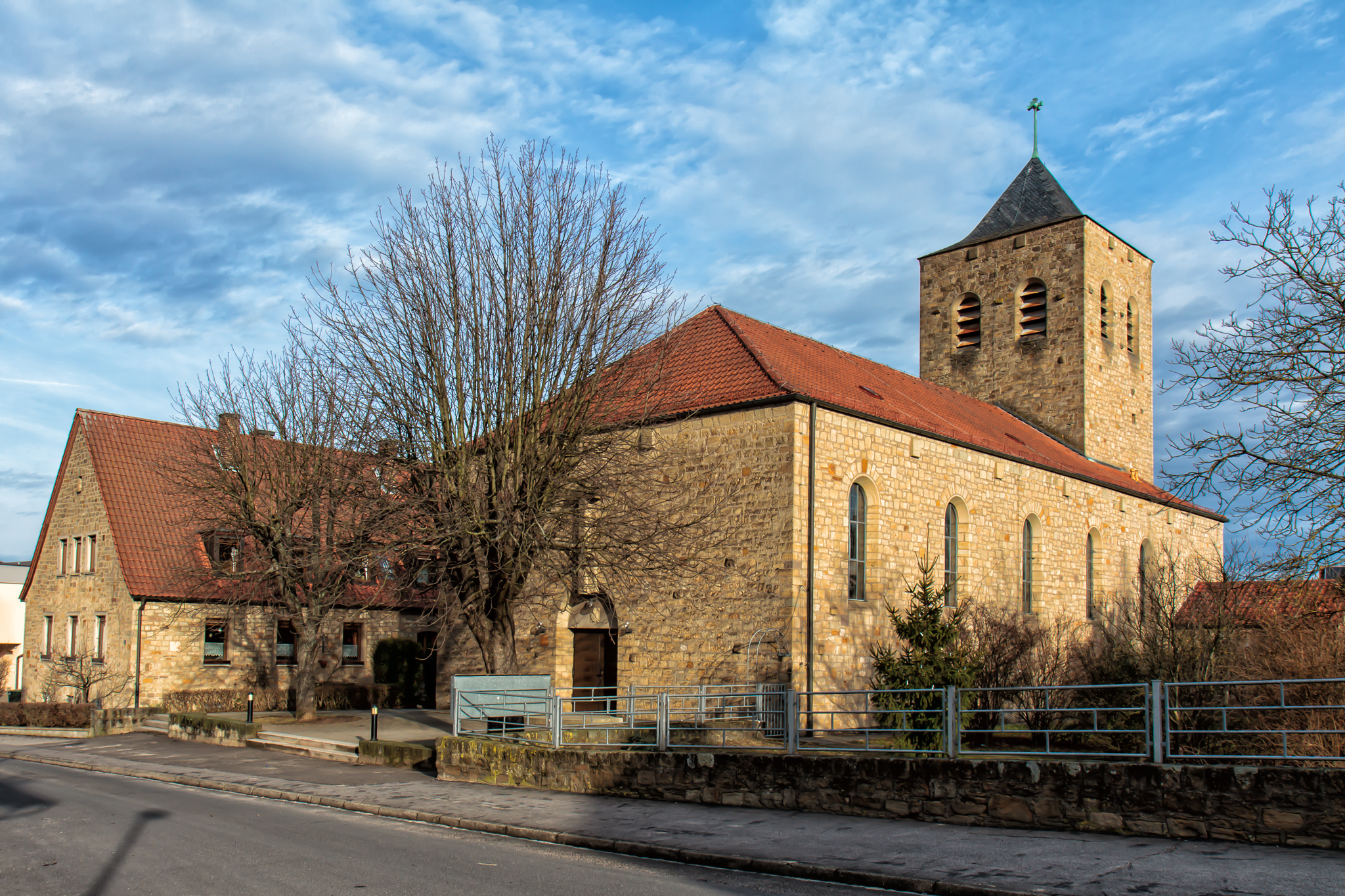
- Church of Saint Elisabeth

- Coat of arms

- Location of Sennfeld within Schweinfurt district
- Interactive map of Sennfeld
- Location within Germany Location within Bavaria
- Coordinates: 50°1′N 10°16′E
- Country: Germany
- State: Bavaria
- Admin. region: Unterfranken
- District: Schweinfurt

Government
  - Mayor (2023–29): Oliver Schulze (FW)

Area
  - Total: 6.98 km^{2} (2.69 sq mi)
- Elevation: 214 m (702 ft)

Population (2025-12-31)
  - Total: 4,193
  - Density: 601/km^{2} (1,560/sq mi)
- Time zone: UTC+01:00 (CET)
  - Summer (DST): UTC+02:00 (CEST)
- Postal codes: 97526
- Dialling codes: 09721
- Vehicle registration: SW
- Website: www.sennfeld.de

Sennfeld (German pronunciation: [ˈzɛnˌfɛlt]) is a municipality in the district of Schweinfurt in Bavaria, Germany. Historically, along with its neighboring village of Gochsheim, it had the rare situation of being a Reichsdorf or Imperial Village.
