= Gerolzhofen (Verwaltungsgemeinschaft) =

- Verwaltungsgemeinschaft
- Location of Gerolzhofen within Schweinfurt district
- Interactive map of Gerolzhofen
- Location within Germany Location within Bavaria
- Coordinates: 49°54′N 10°21′E
- Country: Germany
- State: Bavaria
- Admin. region: Lower Franconia
- District: Schweinfurt
- Seat: Gerolzhofen
- Subdivisions: 8 municipalities

Area
  - Total: 147.97 km^{2} (57.13 sq mi)

Population (2025-12-31)
  - Total: 16,414
  - Density: 110.93/km^{2} (287.30/sq mi)
- Time zone: UTC+01:00 (CET)
  - Summer (DST): UTC+02:00 (CEST)
- Website: www.vg-gerolzhofen.de

Gerolzhofen is a Verwaltungsgemeinschaft (municipal association) in the district of Schweinfurt in Bavaria, Germany. Its seat is in Gerolzhofen.

It consists of the following municipalities:

1. Dingolshausen
2. Donnersdorf
3. Frankenwinheim
4. Gerolzhofen
5. Lülsfeld
6. Michelau im Steigerwald
7. Oberschwarzach
8. Sulzheim
