= Schwanfeld (Verwaltungsgemeinschaft) =

- Verwaltungsgemeinschaft
- Location of Schwanfeld within Schweinfurt district
- Interactive map of Schwanfeld
- Location within Germany Location within Bavaria
- Coordinates: 49°55′N 10°08′E
- Country: Germany
- State: Bavaria
- Admin. region: Lower Franconia
- District: Schweinfurt
- Seat: Schwanfeld
- Subdivisions: 2 municipalities

Area
  - Total: 17.33 km^{2} (6.69 sq mi)

Population (2025-12-31)
  - Total: 2,717
  - Density: 156.8/km^{2} (406.1/sq mi)
- Time zone: UTC+01:00 (CET)
  - Summer (DST): UTC+02:00 (CEST)
- Website: vgschwanfeld.de

Schwanfeld is a Verwaltungsgemeinschaft (municipal association) in the district of Schweinfurt in Bavaria, Germany. Its seat is in Schwanfeld.

It consists of the following municipalities:

1. Schwanfeld
2. Wipfeld
