= Röthlein =

- Municipality
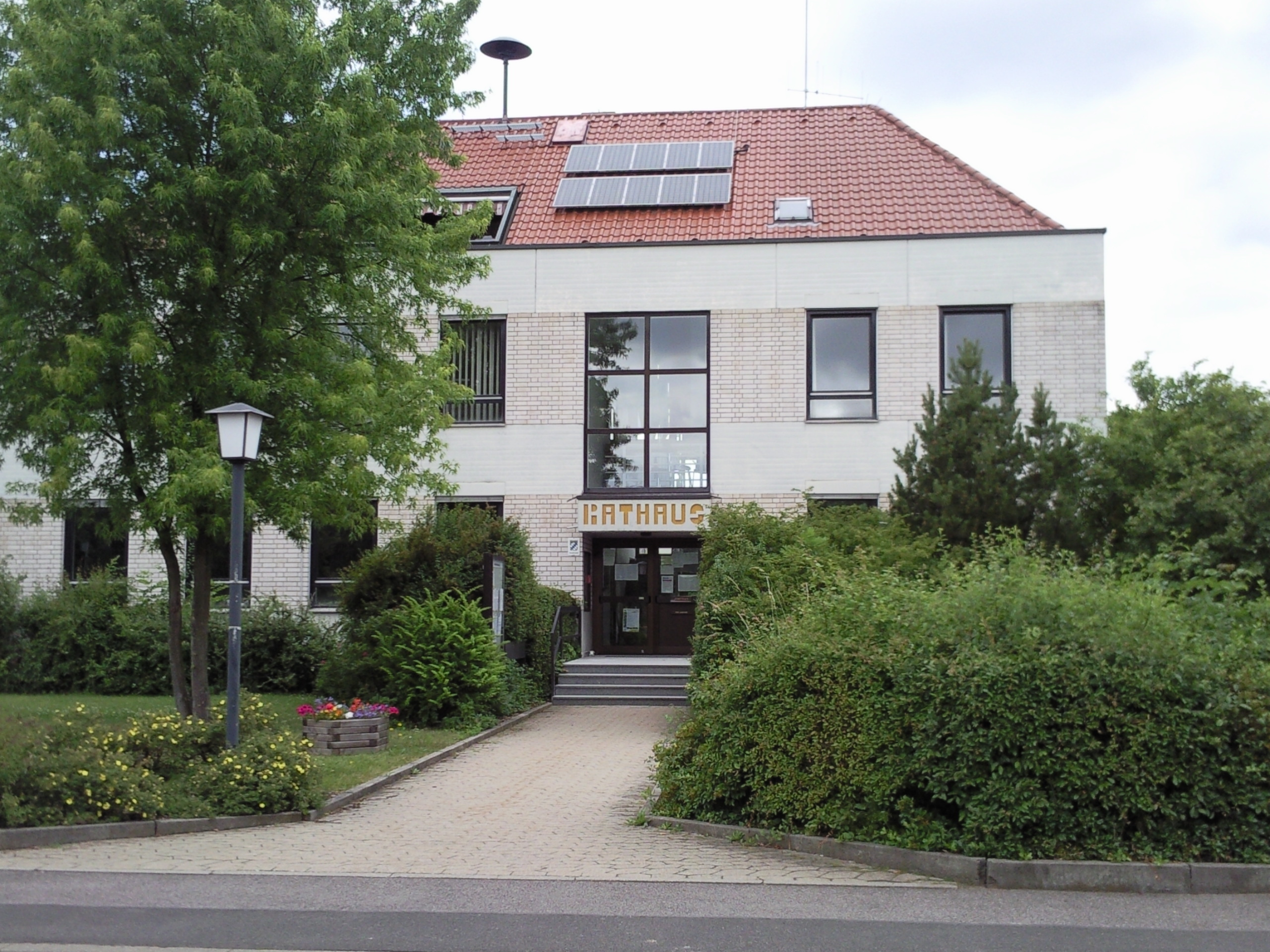
- Röthlein Rathaus, or Town Hall

- Coat of arms

- Location of Röthlein within Schweinfurt district
- Interactive map of Röthlein
- Location within Germany Location within Bavaria
- Coordinates: 49°58′N 10°13′E
- Country: Germany
- State: Bavaria
- Admin. region: Unterfranken
- District: Schweinfurt
- Subdivisions: 3 Ortsteile

Government
  - Mayor (2020–26): Peter Gehring

Area
  - Total: 19.09 km^{2} (7.37 sq mi)
- Elevation: 211 m (692 ft)

Population (2025-12-31)
  - Total: 4,377
  - Density: 229.3/km^{2} (593.8/sq mi)
- Time zone: UTC+01:00 (CET)
  - Summer (DST): UTC+02:00 (CEST)
- Postal codes: 97520
- Dialling codes: 09723
- Vehicle registration: SW
- Website: www.roethlein.de

Röthlein is a municipality in the district of Schweinfurt in Bavaria, Germany. The village is located south of Schweinfurt, close to the Main valley. The quarters are Röthlein, Heidenfeld and Hirschfeld.
