= Schonungen =

- Municipality
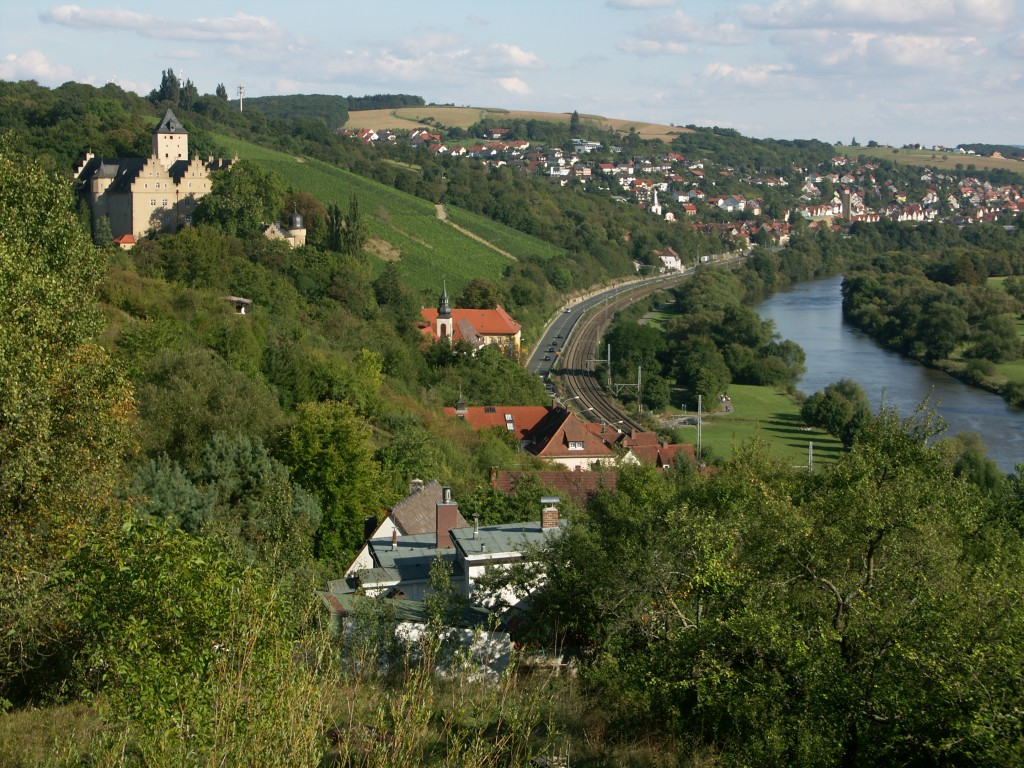
- Mainberg Castle (left), river Main (right) and Schonungen in the background

- Coat of arms

- Location of Schonungen within Schweinfurt district
- Interactive map of Schonungen
- Location within Germany Location within Bavaria
- Coordinates: 50°03′N 10°19′E
- Country: Germany
- State: Bavaria
- Admin. region: Unterfranken
- District: Schweinfurt
- Subdivisions: 9 Ortsteile

Government
  - Mayor (2020–26): Stefan Rottmann (SPD)

Area
  - Total: 81.03 km^{2} (31.29 sq mi)
- Elevation: 218 m (715 ft)

Population (2025-12-31)
  - Total: 7,575
  - Density: 93.48/km^{2} (242.1/sq mi)
- Time zone: UTC+01:00 (CET)
  - Summer (DST): UTC+02:00 (CEST)
- Postal codes: 97453
- Dialling codes: 09721, 09727, 09526
- Vehicle registration: SW
- Website: www.schonungen.de

Schonungen is a municipality in the Schweinfurt district, Bavaria, Germany. The villages in this municipality are:

- Schonungen
- Forst (Unterfranken)
- Abersfeld
- Mainberg
- Hausen
- Marktsteinach
- Loeffelsterz
- Reichmannshausen

and some more
