= Dingolshausen =

- Municipality
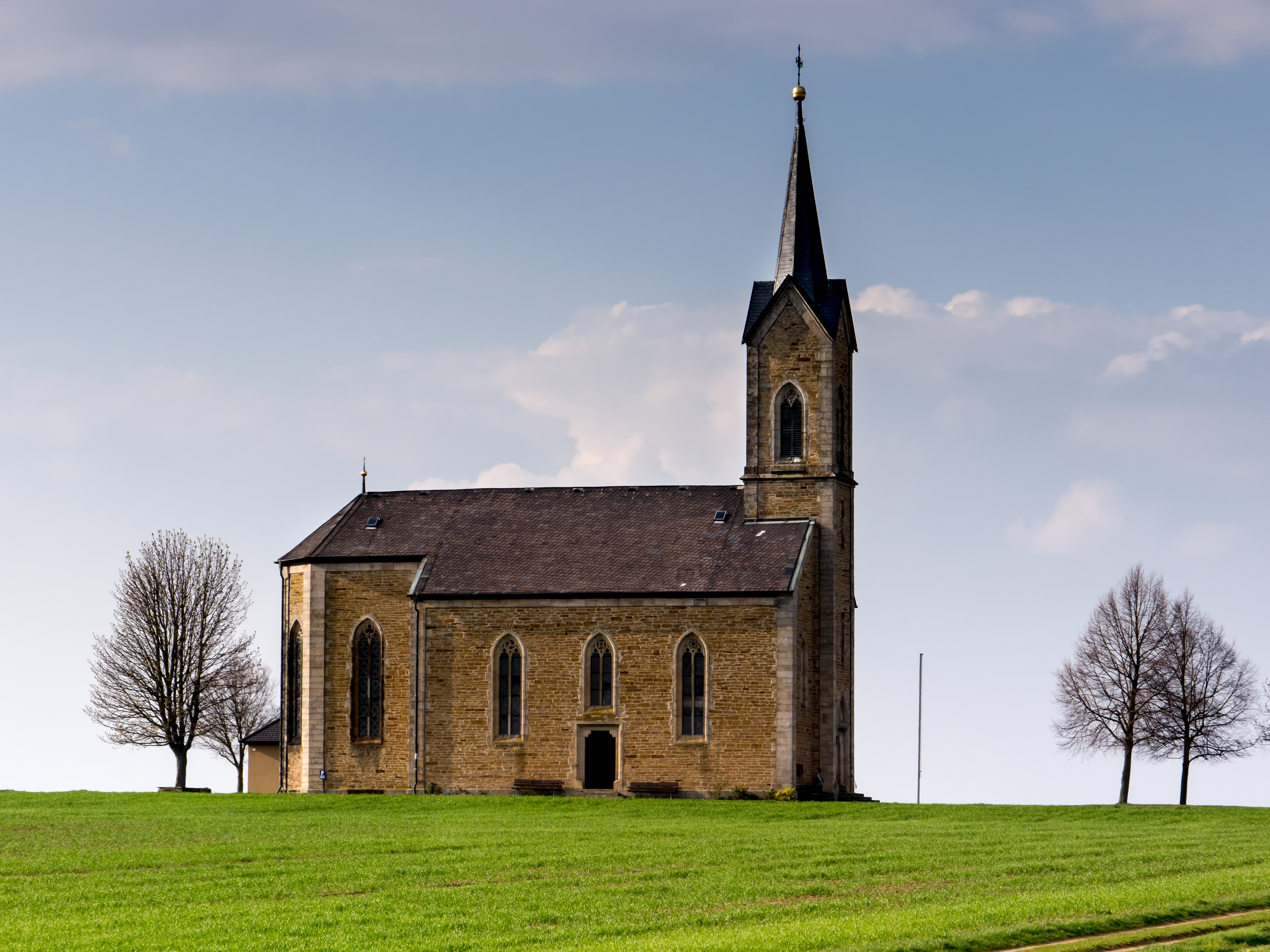
- Pilgrimage Church of Our Lady of Help in Bischwind

- Coat of arms

- Location of Dingolshausen within Schweinfurt district
- Interactive map of Dingolshausen
- Location within Germany Location within Bavaria
- Coordinates: 49°54′N 10°24′E
- Country: Germany
- State: Bavaria
- Admin. region: Unterfranken
- District: Schweinfurt
- Municipal assoc.: Gerolzhofen

Government
  - Mayor (2020–26): Nicole Weissenseel-Brendler

Area
  - Total: 10.23 km^{2} (3.95 sq mi)
- Elevation: 270 m (890 ft)

Population (2025-12-31)
  - Total: 1,328
  - Density: 129.8/km^{2} (336.2/sq mi)
- Time zone: UTC+01:00 (CET)
  - Summer (DST): UTC+02:00 (CEST)
- Postal codes: 97497
- Dialling codes: 09382
- Vehicle registration: SW
- Website: www.dingolshausen.de

Dingolshausen is a municipality in the district of Schweinfurt in Bavaria, Germany.

Located at the foot of the Steigerwald (forest) and in the valley of a creek named the Volkach. Dingolshausen is known for its wineries.

== Coat of arms ==
The coat of arms was given to Dingolshausen in the year 1561. It shows two grapes as a symbol of the winemakers (Winzwer).

== History ==
The first documented mention of Dingolshausen is in 1165, which was later in the year of 1243 ruled by the Bishopric of Würzburg (Hochstift Wuerzburg).
