= Euerbach =

- Municipality
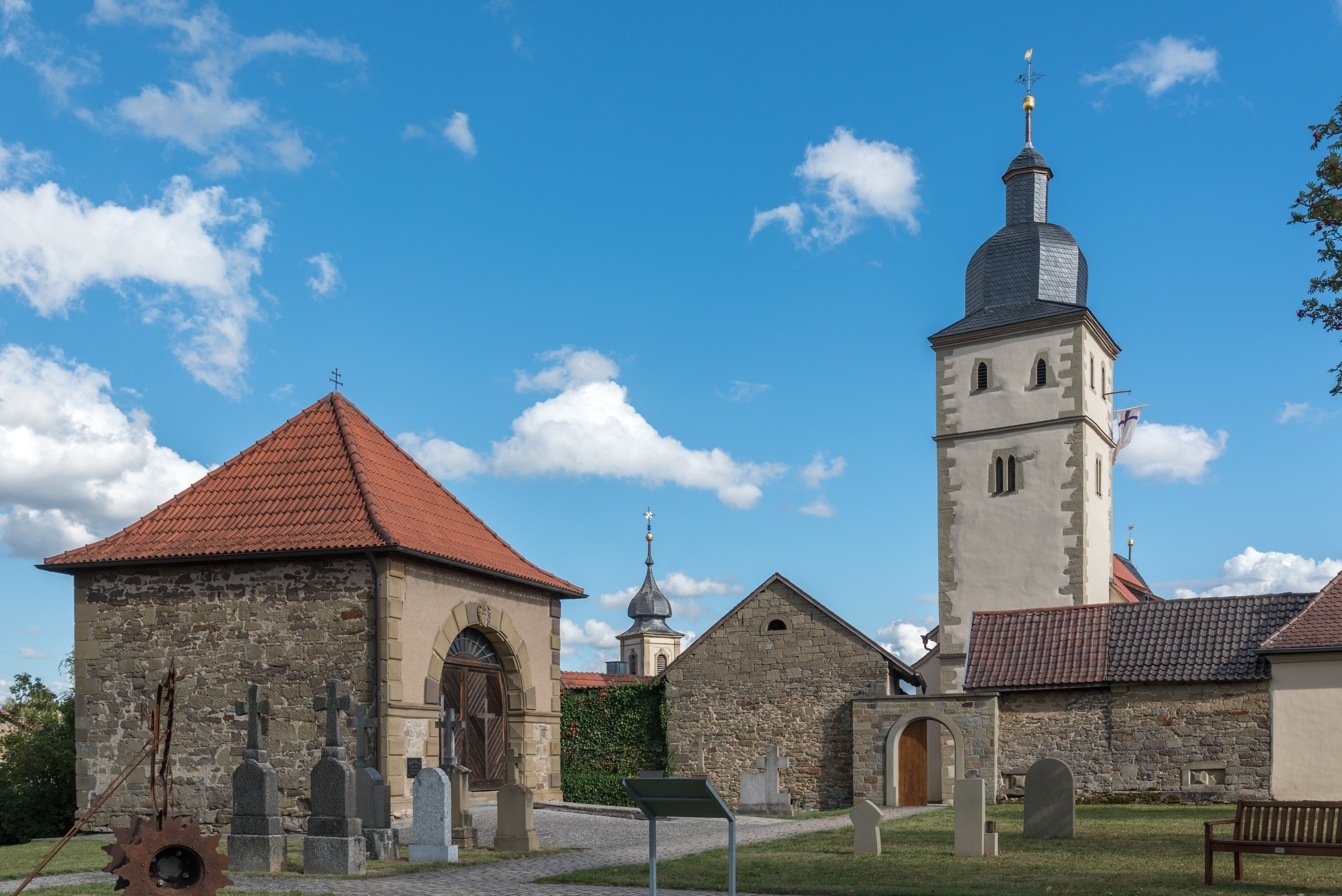
- Church of Saints Cosmas and Damian

- Coat of arms

- Location of Euerbach within Schweinfurt district
- Interactive map of Euerbach
- Location within Germany Location within Bavaria
- Coordinates: 50°4′N 10°7′E
- Country: Germany
- State: Bavaria
- Admin. region: Unterfranken
- District: Schweinfurt
- Subdivisions: 3 Ortsteile

Government
  - Mayor (2020–26): Simone Seufert

Area
  - Total: 17.40 km^{2} (6.72 sq mi)
- Elevation: 238 m (781 ft)

Population (2025-12-31)
  - Total: 2,850
  - Density: 164/km^{2} (424/sq mi)
- Time zone: UTC+01:00 (CET)
  - Summer (DST): UTC+02:00 (CEST)
- Postal codes: 97502
- Dialling codes: 09726
- Vehicle registration: SW
- Website: www.euerbach.de

Euerbach is a municipality in the district of Schweinfurt in Bavaria, Germany. Its motto is "Faszination Kultur und Natur", meaning, "Fascination of culture and nature."
