= Poppenhausen =

- Municipality
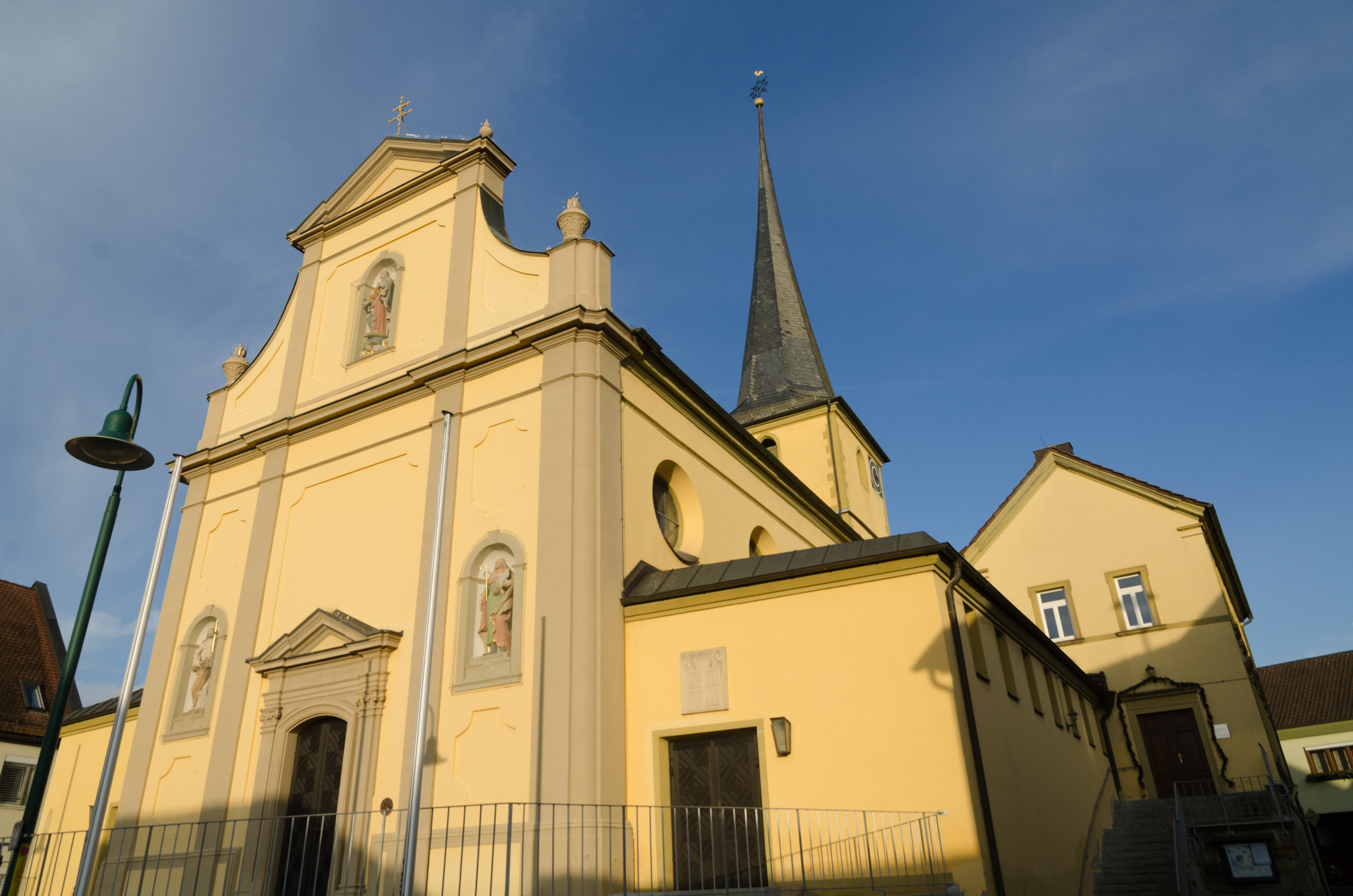
- Church of Saint James

- Coat of arms

- Location of Poppenhausen within Schweinfurt district
- Interactive map of Poppenhausen
- Location within Germany Location within Bavaria
- Coordinates: 50°6′N 10°9′E
- Country: Germany
- State: Bavaria
- Admin. region: Unterfranken
- District: Schweinfurt
- Subdivisions: 6 Ortsteile

Government
  - Mayor (2020–26): Ludwig Bernhard Nätscher (CSU)

Area
  - Total: 39.13 km^{2} (15.11 sq mi)
- Elevation: 250 m (820 ft)

Population (2025-12-31)
  - Total: 4,360
  - Density: 111/km^{2} (289/sq mi)
- Time zone: UTC+01:00 (CET)
  - Summer (DST): UTC+02:00 (CEST)
- Postal codes: 97490
- Dialling codes: 09725
- Vehicle registration: SW
- Website: www.poppenhausen.de

Poppenhausen is a municipality in the district of Schweinfurt in Bavaria, Germany. It consists of the following six localities: Hain, Kronungen, Kützberg, Maibach, Pfersdorf, Poppenhausen.

== Population ==
As per population census 2022, Poppenhausen has a population of 4,384.
