= Schwanfeld =

- Municipality
- Coat of arms

- Location of Schwanfeld within Schweinfurt district
- Interactive map of Schwanfeld
- Location within Germany Location within Bavaria
- Coordinates: 49°55′N 10°8′E
- Country: Germany
- State: Bavaria
- Admin. region: Unterfranken
- District: Schweinfurt
- Municipal assoc.: Schwanfeld

Government
  - Mayor (2020–26): Lisa Krein

Area
  - Total: 12.00 km^{2} (4.63 sq mi)
- Elevation: 242 m (794 ft)

Population (2025-12-31)
  - Total: 1,754
  - Density: 146.2/km^{2} (378.6/sq mi)
- Time zone: UTC+01:00 (CET)
  - Summer (DST): UTC+02:00 (CEST)
- Postal codes: 97523
- Dialling codes: 09384
- Vehicle registration: SW
- Website: www.schwanfeld.de

Schwanfeld is a municipality in the Schweinfurt district in Bavaria, Germany.
