= Frankenwinheim =

- Municipality
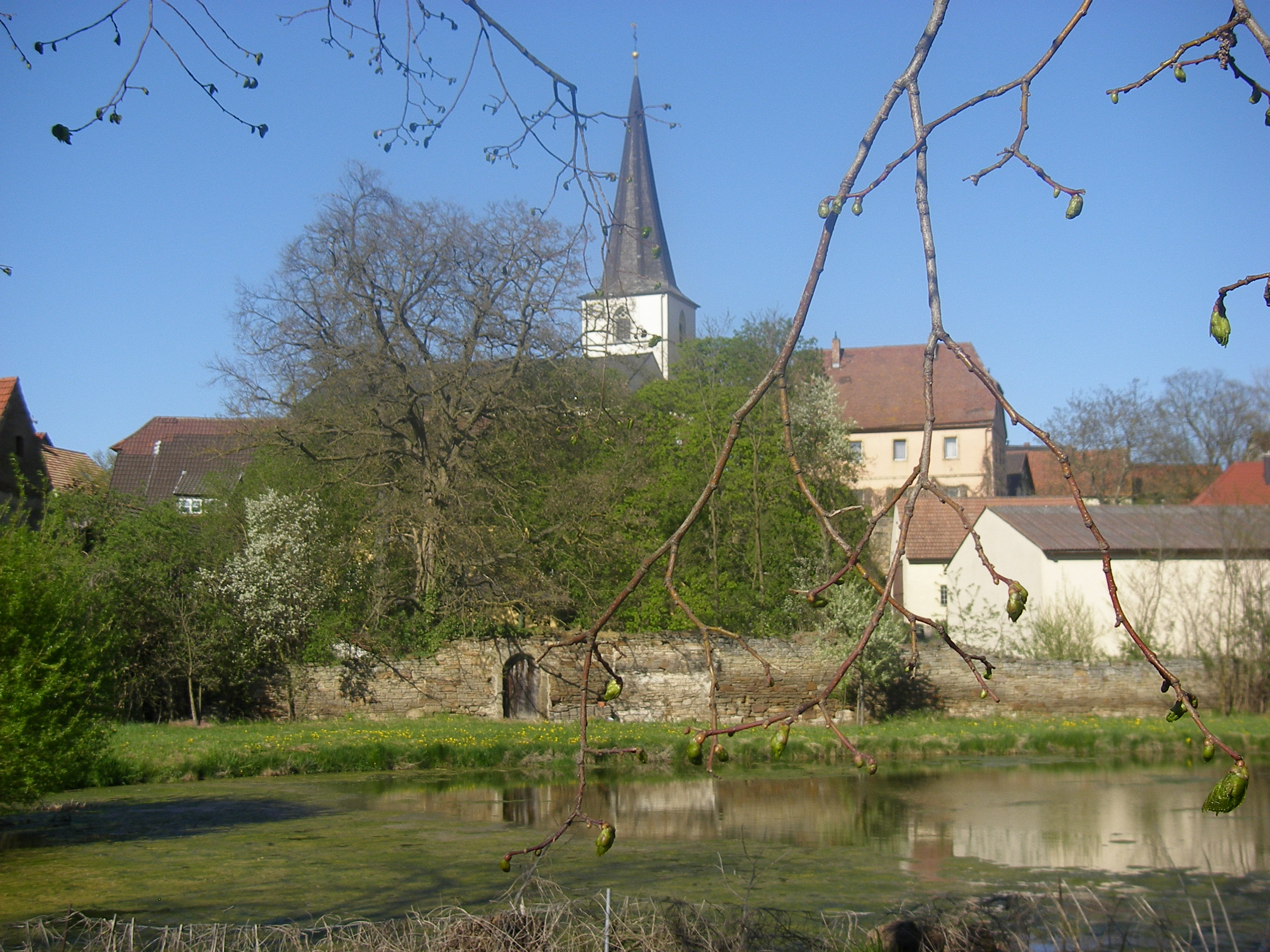
- Church of Saint John the Baptist

- Coat of arms

- Location of Frankenwinheim within Schweinfurt district
- Interactive map of Frankenwinheim
- Location within Germany Location within Bavaria
- Coordinates: 49°53′15″N 10°18′52″E
- Country: Germany
- State: Bavaria
- Admin. region: Lower Franconia
- District: Schweinfurt
- Municipal assoc.: Gerolzhofen
- Founded: 779

Government
  - Mayor (2020–26): Herbert Fröhlich (CSU)

Area
  - Total: 14.7 km^{2} (5.7 sq mi)
- Elevation: 237 m (778 ft)

Population (2025-12-31)
  - Total: 984
  - Density: 66.9/km^{2} (173/sq mi)
- Time zone: UTC+01:00 (CET)
  - Summer (DST): UTC+02:00 (CEST)
- Postal codes: 97447
- Dialling codes: 09382
- Vehicle registration: SW
- Website: www.frankenwinheim.de

Frankenwinheim is a village in the district of Schweinfurt in Bavaria, Germany and part of Verwaltungsgemeinschaft Gerolzhofen.

== Geography ==
Frankenwinheim is in the Main Rhön region, circa 20 kilometers south of Schweinfurt. Frankenheim is divided into Frankenwinheim and Brünnstadt

== History ==
Frankenwinheim was first mentioned in the year 779 A.D. and is thus already over 1240 years old. Formerly the village was part of the principality of Wiesentheid, that was owned by the counts of Schönborn. In 1806, it was mediatised by Bavaria, and in 1810 it passed on to the Grand Duchy of Würzburg (owned by Grand Duke Ferdinand of Tuscany), with which it finally fell back to Bavaria in 1814.

== Population ==
In the area of the municipality 1970 973, 1987 then 890 and in the year 2005 1016 inhabitants were counted.

== Politics ==
Mayor is Herbert Fröhlich (CSU), in office since 2014. The local rate incomes amounted to in the year 1999 converted 350 k€, of it amounted to the trade tax incomes (net) converted 57 k€.

== Economics and infrastructure ==
=== Economics as well as land and forestry ===
There was 1998 after the official statistics in the producing trade 42 and within the range trade and traffic none liable to social security persons employed at the work place. In other economic sectors 26 persons were liable to social security busy at the work place. Liable to social security person employed at the residence gave it altogether to 288. In the processing trade there were 3 enterprises, in the building main trade of 2 enterprises. Besides existed in the year 1999 39 agricultural enterprises with an agriculturally used surface of 1284 hectares, of it were 1223 hectares of area of arable land and 41 hectares of continuous green area.

=== Education ===
In the year 2006 the following mechanisms existed:

- Kindergartens: 50 kindergarten places with 45 children
