= Geldersheim =

- Municipality
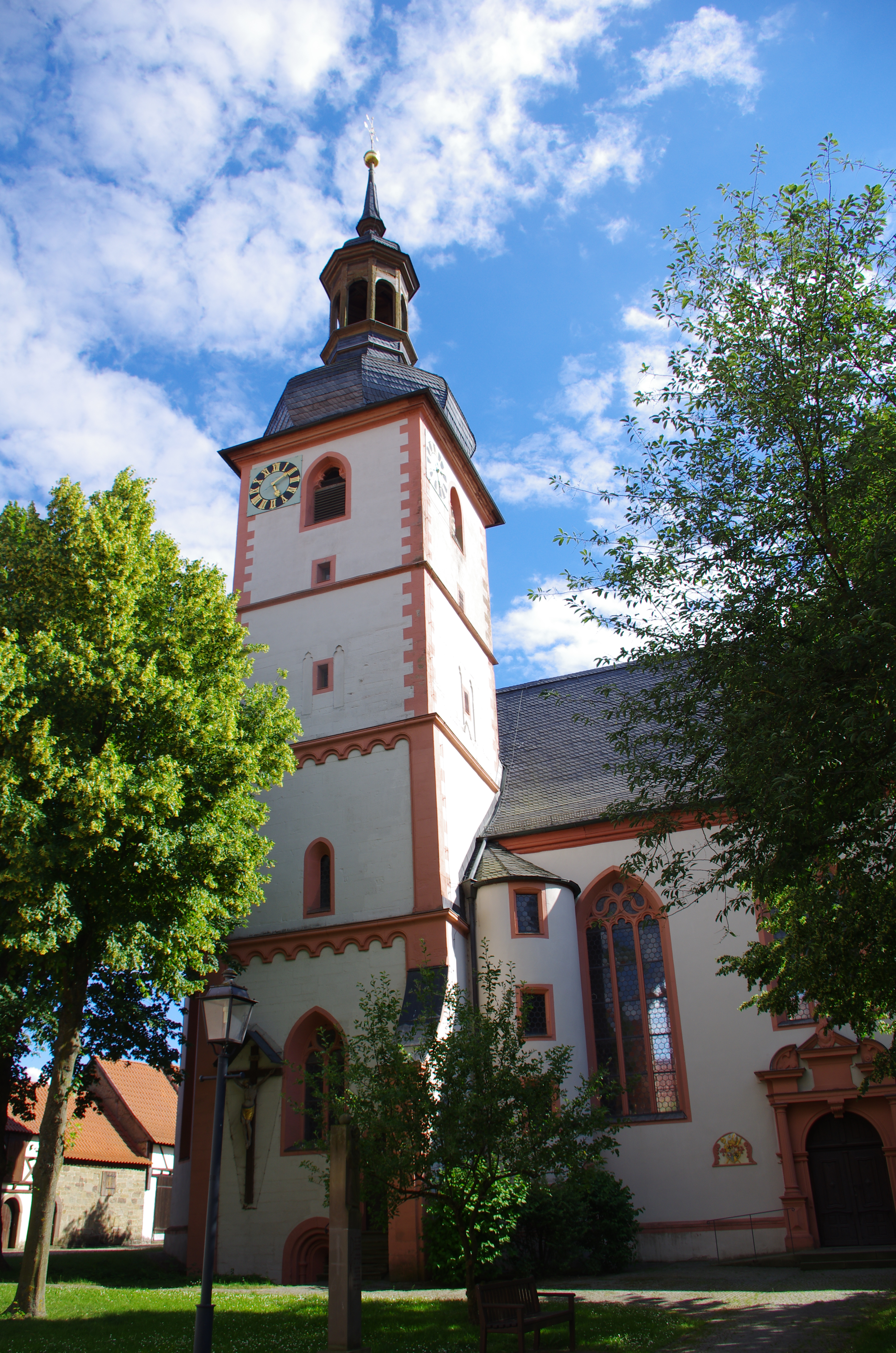
- Church of Saint Nicholas

- Coat of arms

- Location of Geldersheim within Schweinfurt district
- Interactive map of Geldersheim
- Location within Germany Location within Bavaria
- Coordinates: 50°3′N 10°9′E
- Country: Germany
- State: Bavaria
- Admin. region: Unterfranken
- District: Schweinfurt

Government
  - Mayor (2020–26): Thomas Hemmerich

Area
  - Total: 15.32 km^{2} (5.92 sq mi)
- Elevation: 234 m (768 ft)

Population (2025-12-31)
  - Total: 2,514
  - Density: 164.1/km^{2} (425.0/sq mi)
- Time zone: UTC+01:00 (CET)
  - Summer (DST): UTC+02:00 (CEST)
- Postal codes: 97505
- Dialling codes: 09721
- Vehicle registration: SW
- Website: www.geldersheim.de

Geldersheim (German pronunciation: [ˈɡɛldɐshaɪm]) is a municipality in the lower franconian district of Schweinfurt in Bavaria, Germany. Its name roughly translates to "money home".
