= Gerolzhofen =

- Town
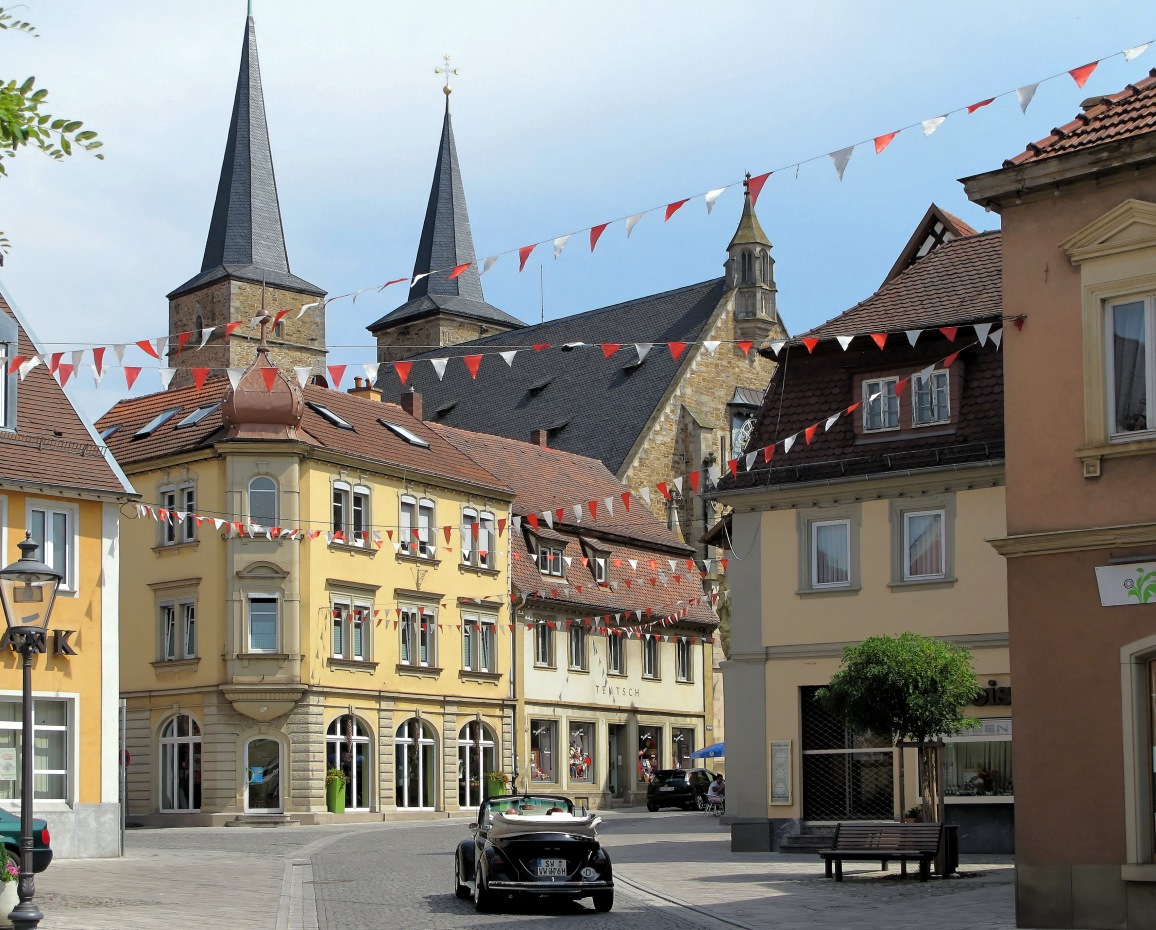
- Center of the town

- Coat of arms

- Location of Gerolzhofen within Schweinfurt district
- Interactive map of Gerolzhofen
- Location within Germany Location within Bavaria
- Coordinates: 49°54′N 10°21′E
- Country: Germany
- State: Bavaria
- Admin. region: Unterfranken
- District: Schweinfurt
- Municipal assoc.: Gerolzhofen
- Subdivisions: 2 Ortsteile

Government
  - Mayor (2020–26): Thorsten Wozniak (CSU)

Area
  - Total: 18.39 km^{2} (7.10 sq mi)
- Elevation: 344 m (1,129 ft)

Population (2025-12-31)
  - Total: 6,771
  - Density: 368.2/km^{2} (953.6/sq mi)
- Time zone: UTC+01:00 (CET)
  - Summer (DST): UTC+02:00 (CEST)
- Postal codes: 97447
- Dialling codes: 09382
- Vehicle registration: SW, GEO
- Website: www.gerolzhofen.de

Gerolzhofen (German: [ˌɡeːʁɔltsˈhoːfn̩]) is a town in the district of Schweinfurt, Bavaria, Germany. The town is the former center of the district of Gerolzhofen and has about 7,000 inhabitants. The mayor of Gerolzhofen is Thorsten Wozniak (CSU).

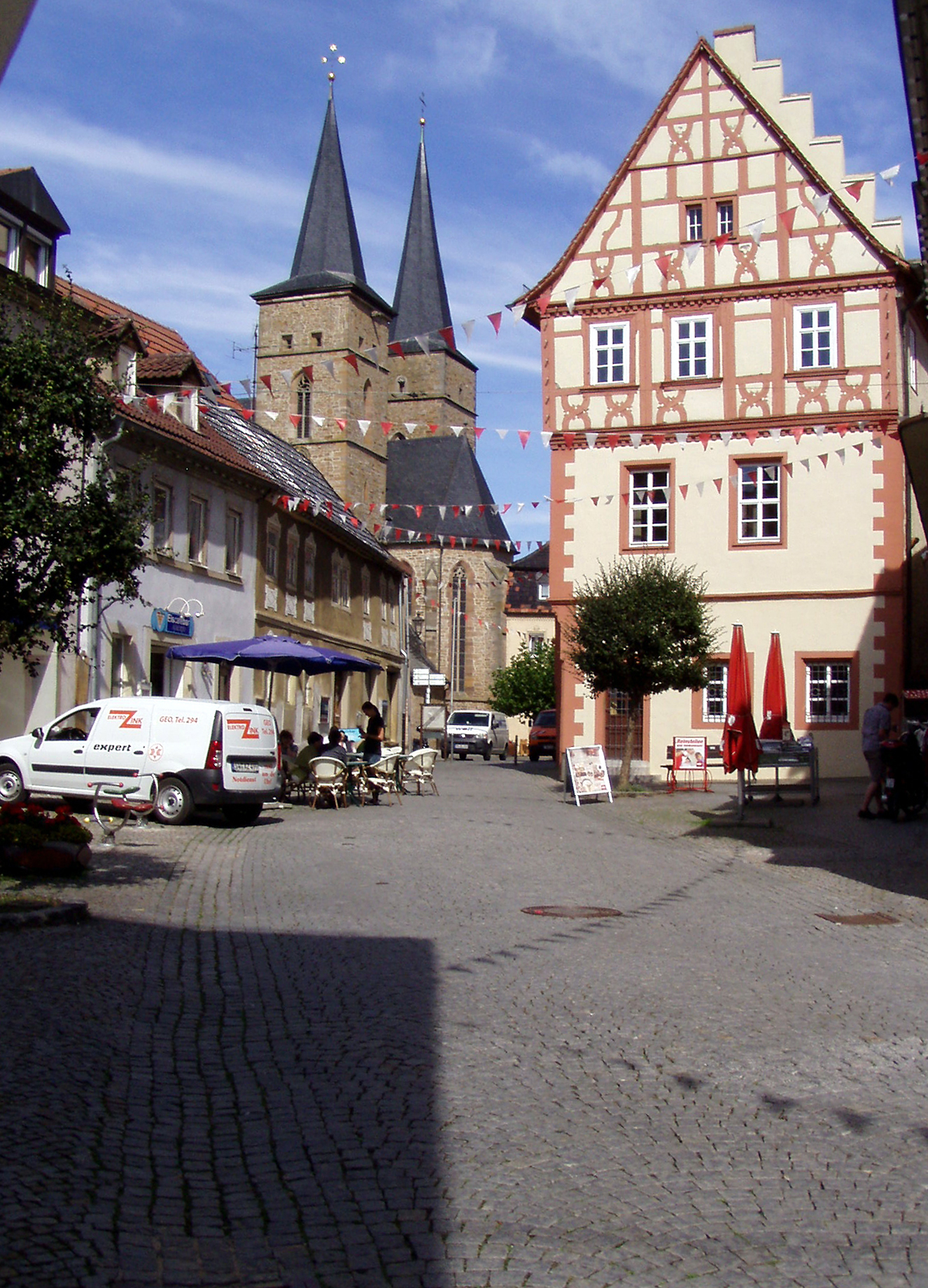
Gerolzhofen core city

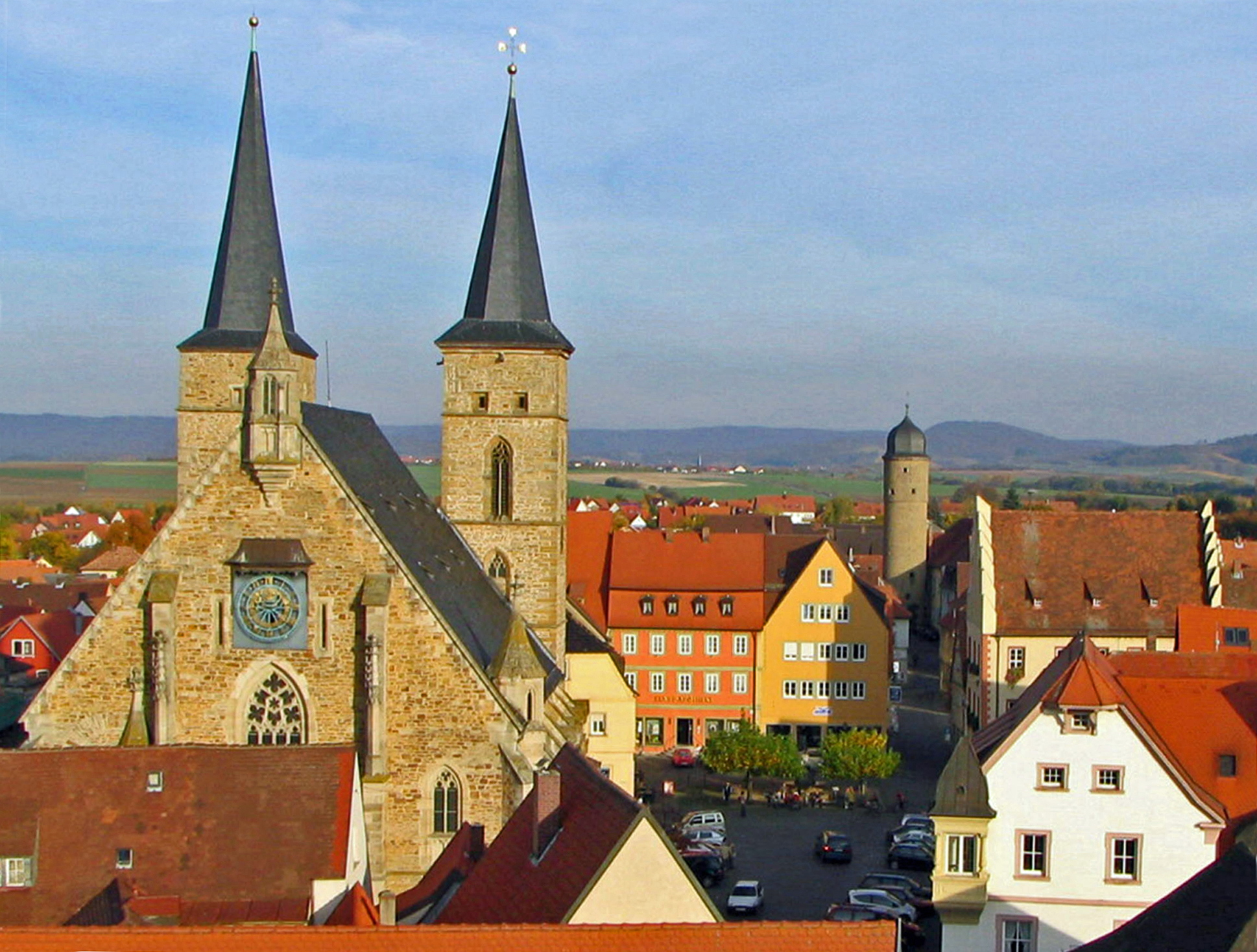
Market place

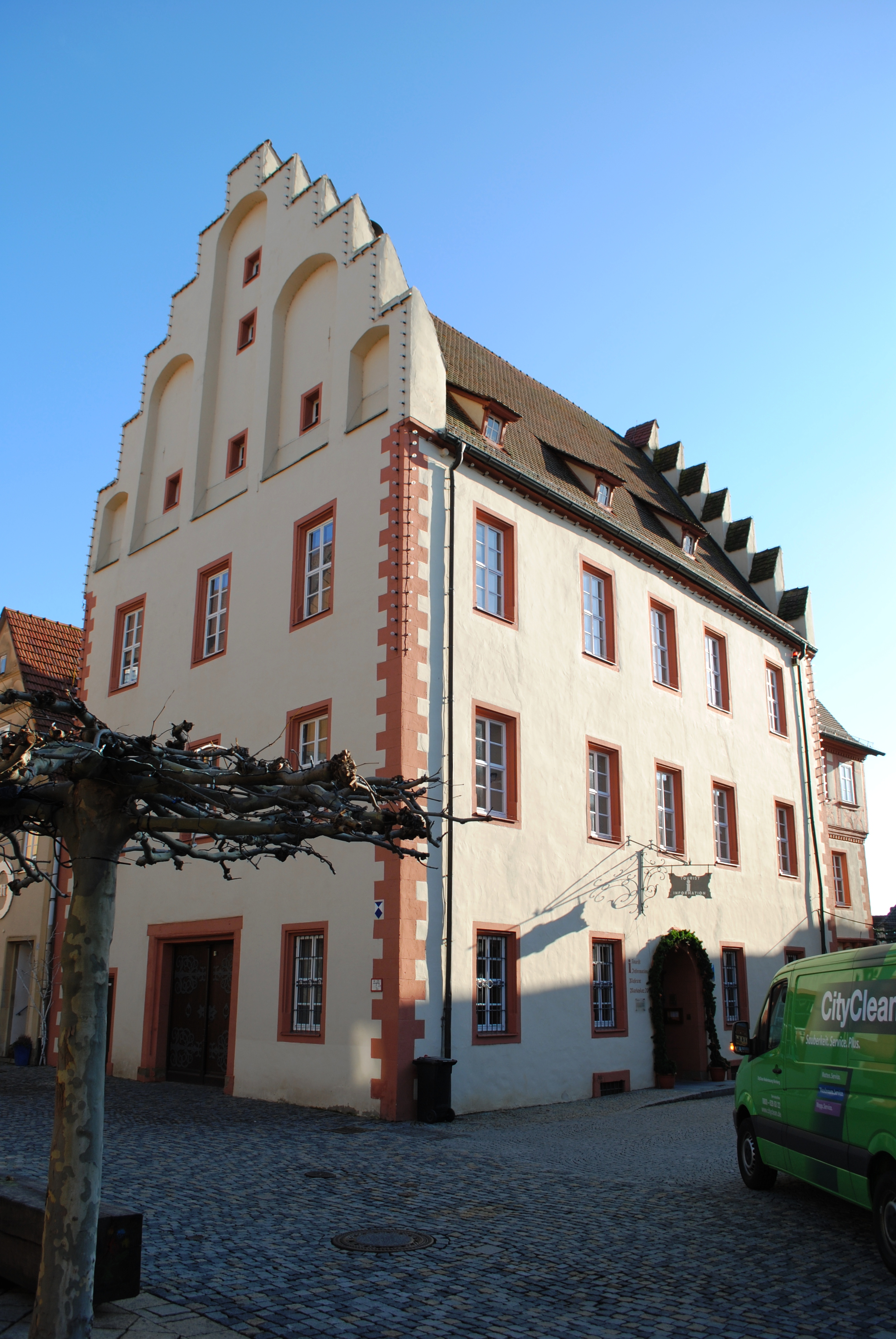
Town hall

== Town partnerships ==
Gerolzhofen is twinned with:

- Mamers, France
- Sè, Benin
- Elek, Hungary
- Rodewisch, Germany
- Scarlino, Italy

== Notable people ==
- Ludwig Derleth (1870-1948), writer (birthplace designated)
- Pia Beckmann (born 1963), politician (CSU), from 1 May 2002 to 30 April 2008 mayor of Würzburg
- Winfried Nöth (born 1944) is a German linguist and semiotician
