= Michelau im Steigerwald =

Michelau i.Steigerwald
- Municipality
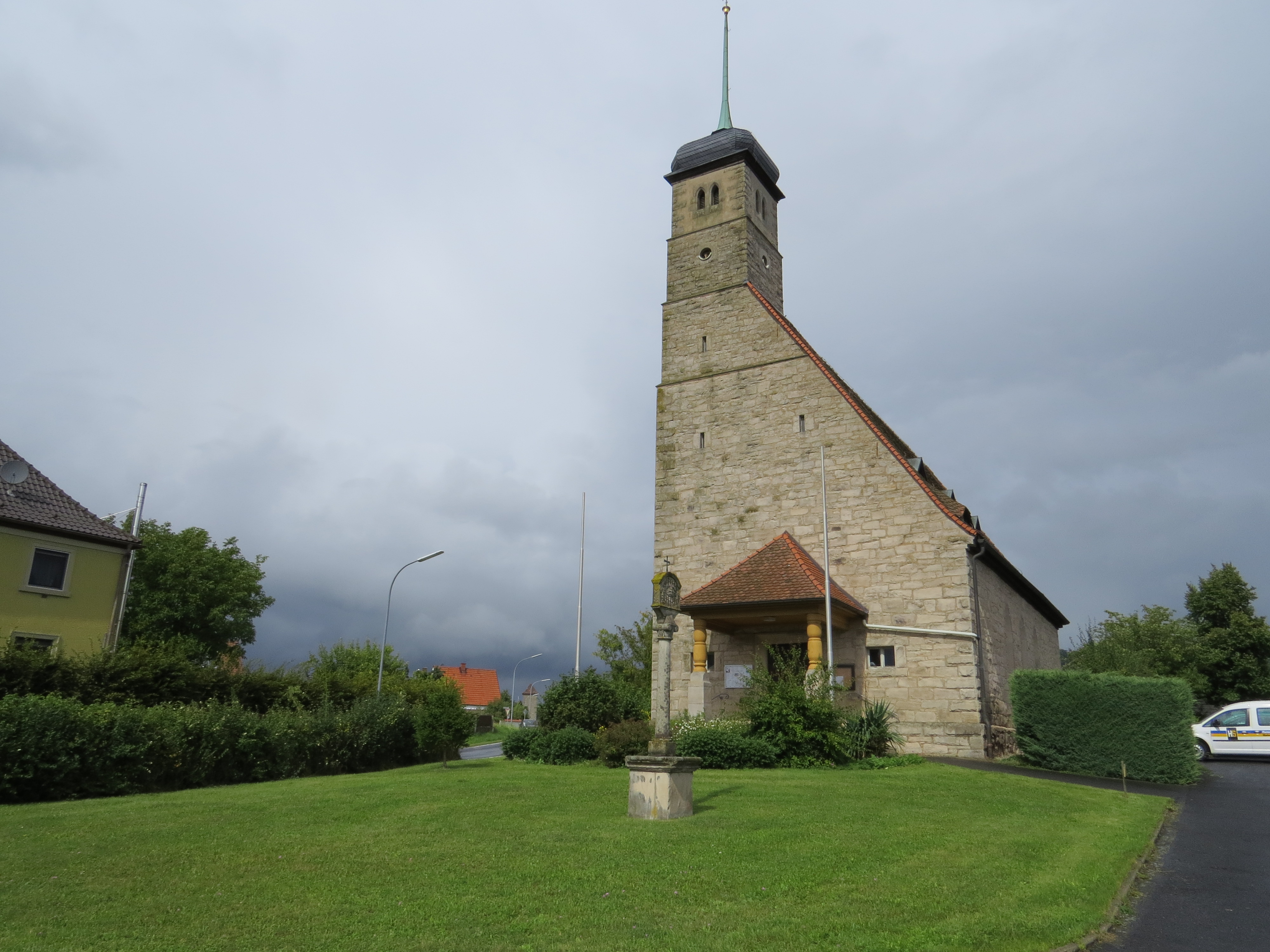
- Church of Saint Sebastian in Hundelshausen

- Coat of arms

- Location of Michelau i.Steigerwald within Schweinfurt district
- Interactive map of Michelau i.Steigerwald
- Location within Germany Location within Bavaria
- Coordinates: 49°54′N 10°26′E
- Country: Germany
- State: Bavaria
- Admin. region: Unterfranken
- District: Schweinfurt
- Municipal assoc.: Gerolzhofen
- Subdivisions: 6 Ortsteile

Government
  - Mayor (2020–26): Michael Wolf

Area
  - Total: 14.16 km^{2} (5.47 sq mi)
- Elevation: 291 m (955 ft)

Population (2025-12-31)
  - Total: 1,166
  - Density: 82.34/km^{2} (213.3/sq mi)
- Time zone: UTC+01:00 (CET)
  - Summer (DST): UTC+02:00 (CEST)
- Postal codes: 97513
- Dialling codes: 09382
- Vehicle registration: SW
- Website: www.michelau.de

Michelau im Steigerwald (German pronunciation: [ˈmɪçəlaʊ ʔɪm ˈʃtaɪɡɐvalt], lit. 'Michelau in the Steigerwald') is a municipality in the district of Schweinfurt in Bavaria, Germany.
