= Lülsfeld =

- Municipality
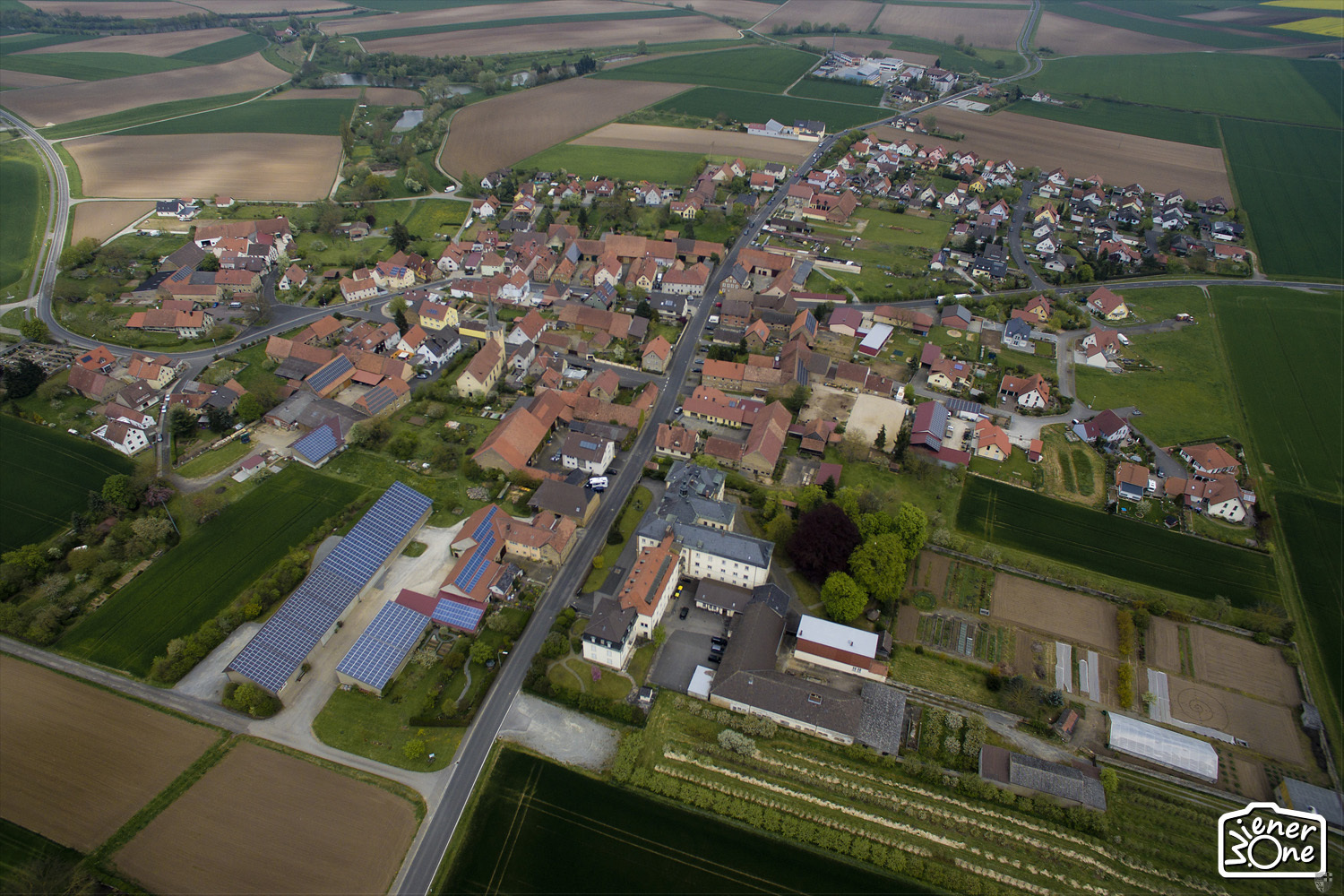
- Aerial view

- Coat of arms

- Location of Lülsfeld within Schweinfurt district
- Interactive map of Lülsfeld
- Location within Germany Location within Bavaria
- Coordinates: 49°52′N 10°20′E
- Country: Germany
- State: Bavaria
- Admin. region: Unterfranken
- District: Schweinfurt
- Municipal assoc.: Gerolzhofen

Government
  - Mayor (2020–26): Thomas Heinrichs

Area
  - Total: 11.20 km^{2} (4.32 sq mi)
- Elevation: 252 m (827 ft)

Population (2025-12-31)
  - Total: 758
  - Density: 67.7/km^{2} (175/sq mi)
- Time zone: UTC+01:00 (CET)
  - Summer (DST): UTC+02:00 (CEST)
- Postal codes: 97511
- Dialling codes: 09382
- Vehicle registration: SW
- Website: www.luelsfeld.de

Lülsfeld is a municipality in the district of Schweinfurt in Bavaria, Germany.
