= Gochsheim =

- Municipality
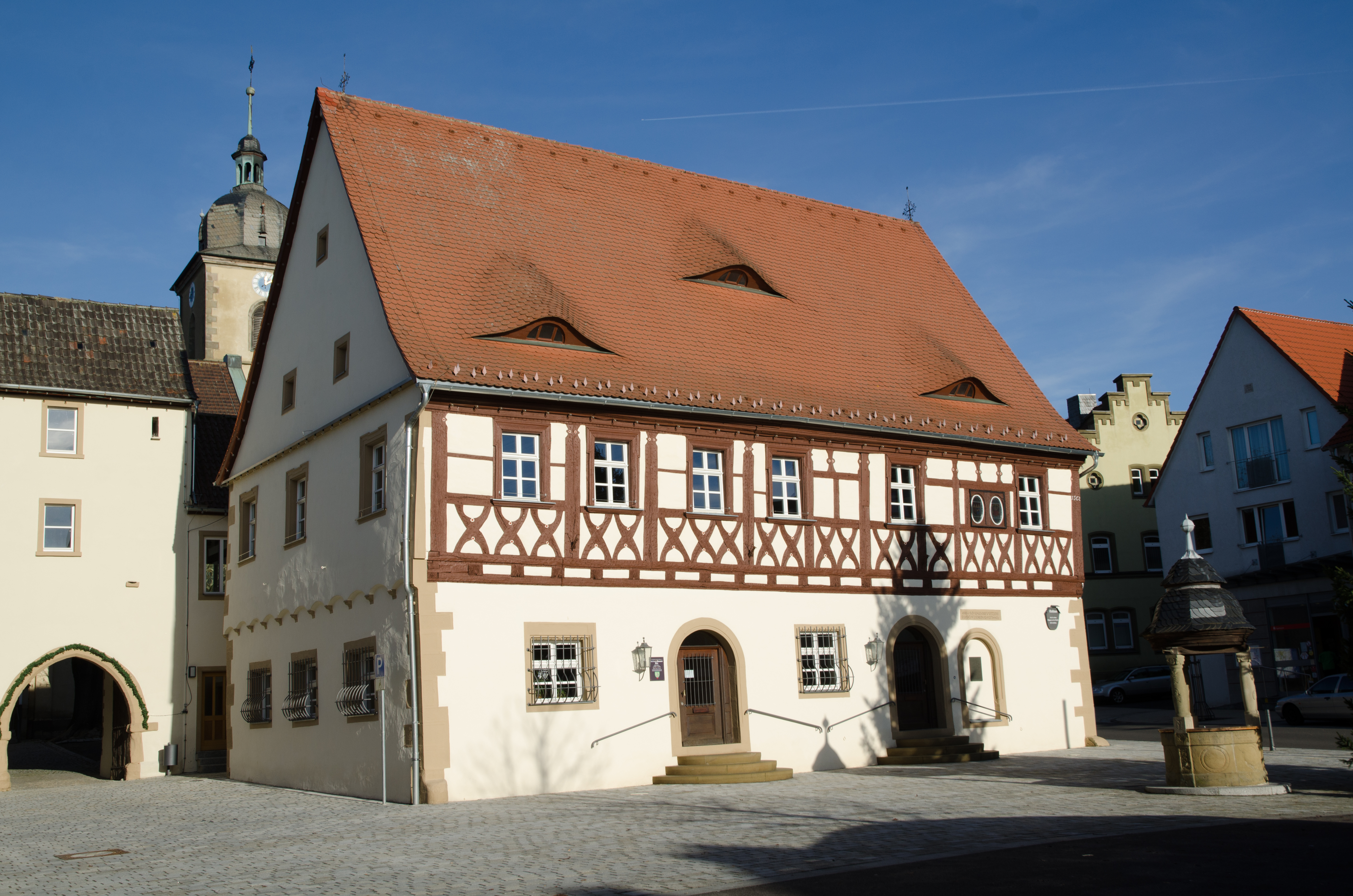
- Town Hall

- Coat of arms

- Location of Gochsheim within Schweinfurt district
- Interactive map of Gochsheim
- Location within Germany Location within Bavaria
- Coordinates: 50°1′N 10°17′E
- Country: Germany
- State: Bavaria
- Admin. region: Unterfranken
- District: Schweinfurt
- Subdivisions: Ortsteile Gochsheim and Weyer

Government
  - Mayor (2020–26): Manuel Kneuer (CSU)

Area
  - Total: 20.67 km^{2} (7.98 sq mi)
- Elevation: 236 m (774 ft)

Population (2025-12-31)
  - Total: 6,082
  - Density: 294.2/km^{2} (762.1/sq mi)
- Time zone: UTC+01:00 (CET)
  - Summer (DST): UTC+02:00 (CEST)
- Postal codes: 97469
- Dialling codes: 09721
- Vehicle registration: SW
- Website: www.gochsheim.de

Gochsheim (German pronunciation: [ˈɡɔxshaɪm]) is a municipality in the district of Schweinfurt in Bavaria, Germany. Historically, along with its neighboring village of Sennfeld, it had the rare situation of being a Reichsdorf or Imperial Village.
