= Grettstadt =

- Municipality
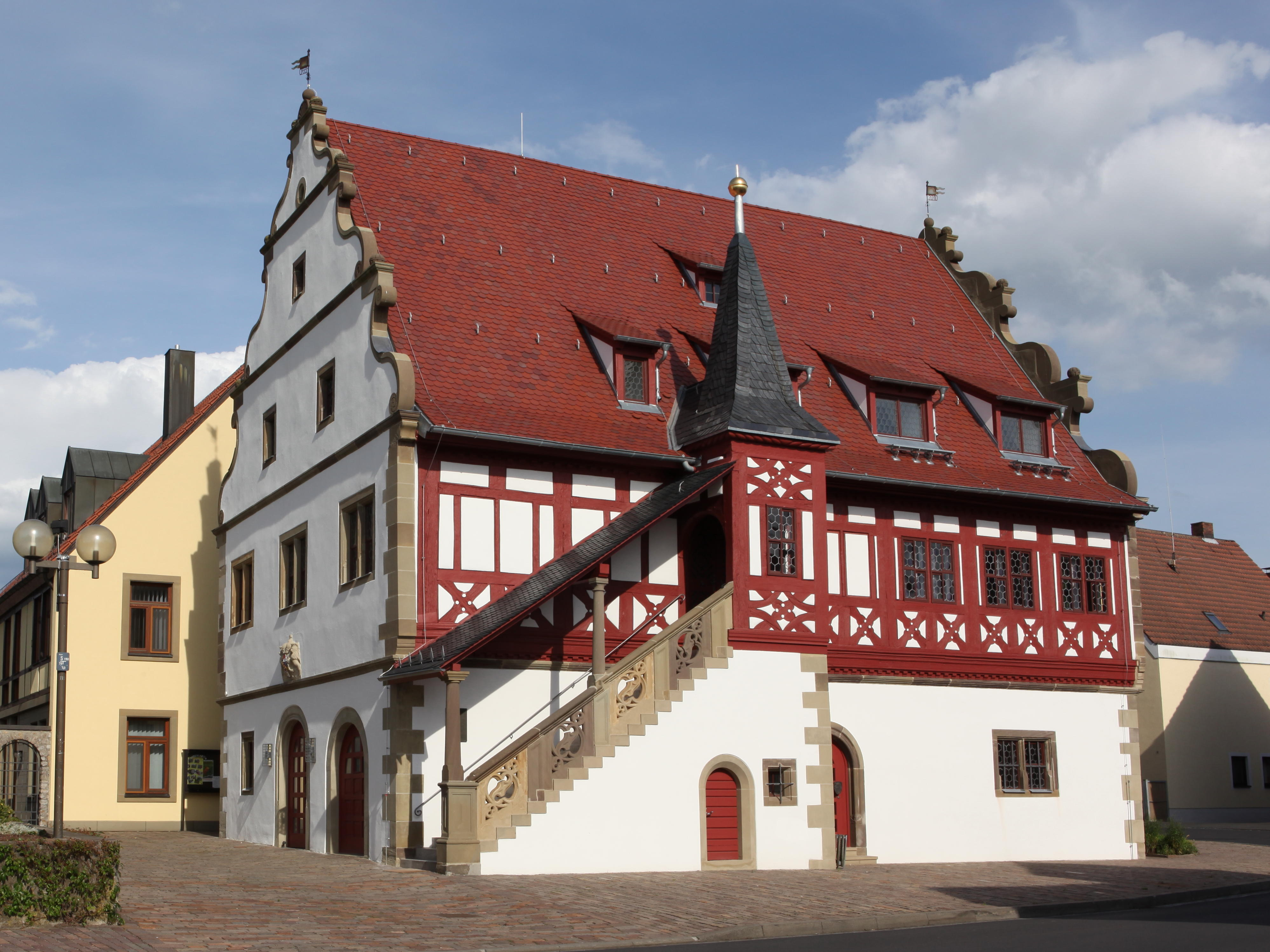
- Old Town Hall

- Coat of arms

- Location of Grettstadt within Schweinfurt district
- Interactive map of Grettstadt
- Location within Germany Location within Bavaria
- Coordinates: 49°59′N 10°19′E
- Country: Germany
- State: Bavaria
- Admin. region: Unterfranken
- District: Schweinfurt

Government
  - Mayor (2022–28): Jens Machnow (CSU)

Area
  - Total: 34.93 km^{2} (13.49 sq mi)
- Elevation: 232 m (761 ft)

Population (2025-12-31)
  - Total: 4,315
  - Density: 123.5/km^{2} (319.9/sq mi)
- Time zone: UTC+01:00 (CET)
  - Summer (DST): UTC+02:00 (CEST)
- Postal codes: 97508
- Dialling codes: 09729
- Vehicle registration: SW
- Website: www.grettstadt.de

Grettstadt is a municipality in the district of Schweinfurt in Bavaria, Germany. It consists of the following villages: Dürrfeld, Grettstadt, Obereuerheim, Untereuerheim.
