= Üchtelhausen =

- Municipality
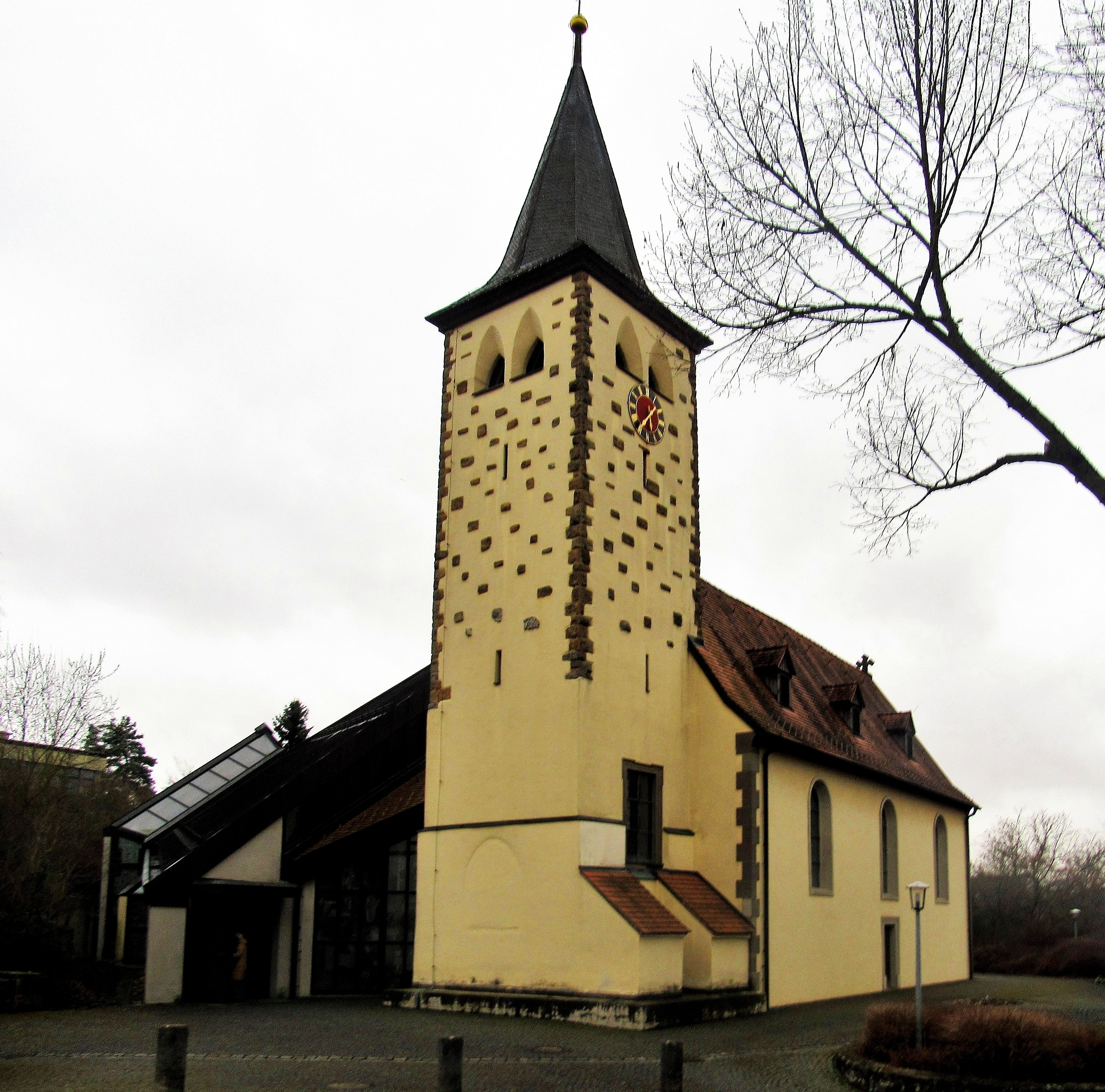
- Church of Saint James

- Coat of arms

- Location of Üchtelhausen within Schweinfurt district
- Interactive map of Üchtelhausen
- Location within Germany Location within Bavaria
- Coordinates: 50°5′N 10°16′E
- Country: Germany
- State: Bavaria
- Admin. region: Lower Franconia
- District: Schweinfurt
- Subdivisions: 9 districts

Government
  - Mayor (2020–26): Johannes Grebner

Area
  - Total: 62.15 km^{2} (24.00 sq mi)
- Elevation: 322 m (1,056 ft)

Population (2025-12-31)
  - Total: 3,736
  - Density: 60.11/km^{2} (155.7/sq mi)
- Time zone: UTC+01:00 (CET)
  - Summer (DST): UTC+02:00 (CEST)
- Postal codes: 97532
- Dialling codes: 09720
- Vehicle registration: SW
- Website: www.uechtelhausen.de

Üchtelhausen is a municipality and community in the district of Schweinfurt in Bavaria, Germany.

== Geography ==
Üchtelhausen is located in region Main - Rhön Mountains.

It exists following districts: Ebertshausen, Hesselbach, Hoppachshof, Madenhausen, Ottenhausen, Thomashof, Weipoltshausen, Zell, Üchtelhausen.
