= Niederwerrn =

- Municipality
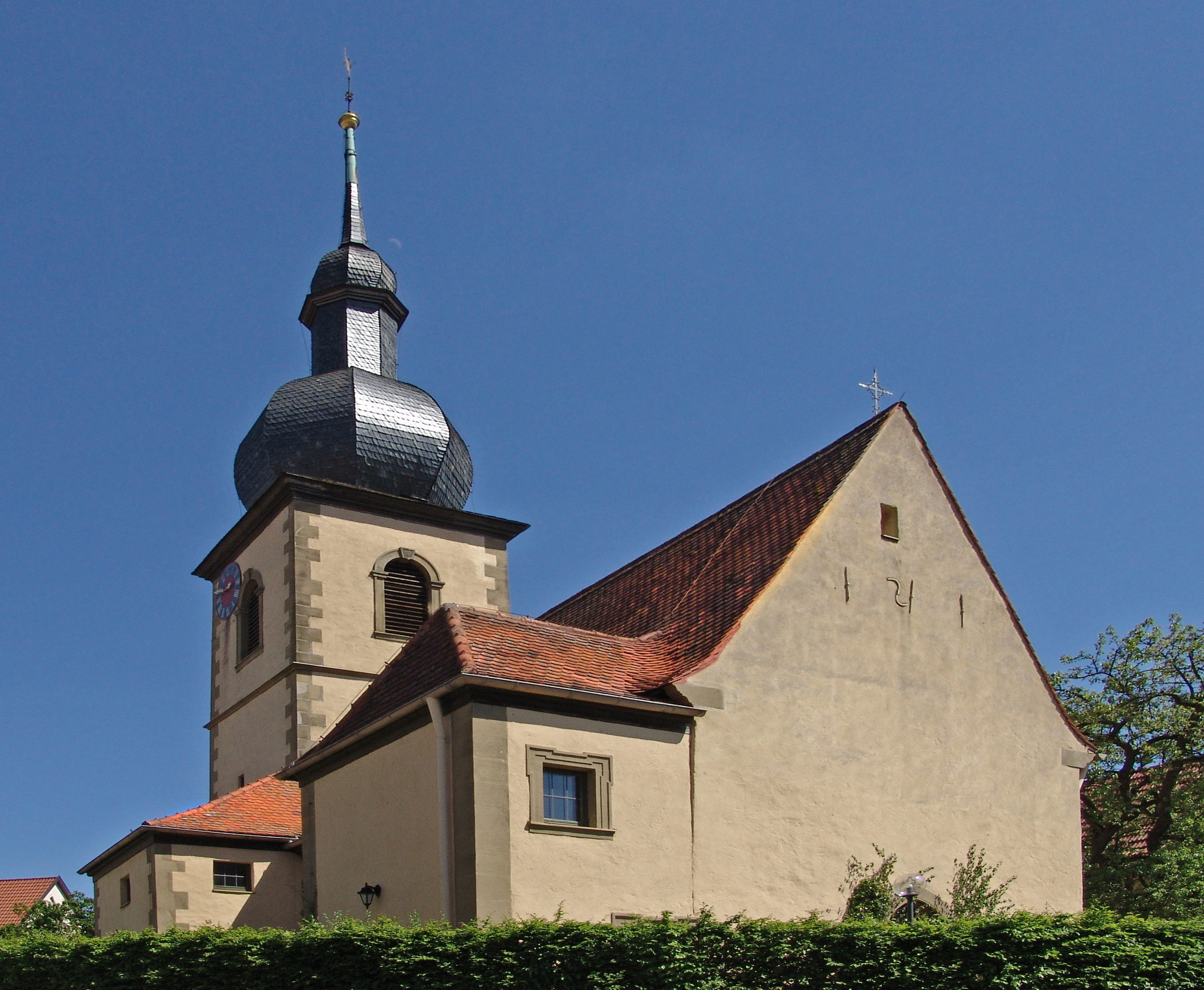
- Lutheran parish church

- Coat of arms

- Location of Niederwerrn within Schweinfurt district
- Interactive map of Niederwerrn
- Location within Germany Location within Bavaria
- Coordinates: 50°03′48″N 10°10′22″E
- Country: Germany
- State: Bavaria
- Admin. region: Unterfranken
- District: Schweinfurt
- Subdivisions: 2 Ortsteile

Government
  - Mayor (2020–26): Bettina Bärmann (FW)

Area
  - Total: 9.77 km^{2} (3.77 sq mi)
- Elevation: 240 m (790 ft)

Population (2025-12-31)
  - Total: 8,347
  - Density: 854/km^{2} (2,210/sq mi)
- Time zone: UTC+01:00 (CET)
  - Summer (DST): UTC+02:00 (CEST)
- Postal codes: 97464
- Dialling codes: 09721
- Vehicle registration: SW
- Website: www.niederwerrn.de

Niederwerrn is a municipality in the district of Schweinfurt in Bavaria, Germany.

== Twin towns – sister cities ==
Niederwerrn is twinned with:

- Ifs, France. Since 1992
