= Winfried Nöth =

German linguist and semiotician (born 1944)

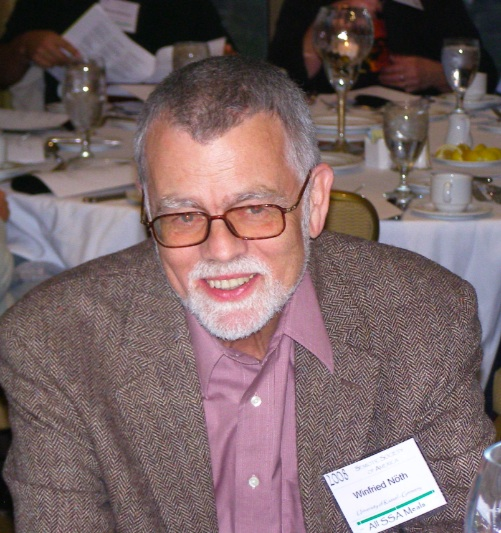
Winfried Nöth (2009)

Winfried Nöth (born September 12, 1944 in Gerolzhofen) is a German linguist and semiotician.

After graduating from high school in 1963 in Brunswick, from 1965 to 1969 Nöth studied English, French and Portuguese in Münster, Geneva, Lisbon and Bochum, and in 1971 acquired his doctoral degrees at the Ruhr University Bochum. In Bochum he also habilitated in 1976 and became assistant to Walter A. Koch. After teaching in Bochum and Aachen, in 1978 he was appointed full professor in English Linguistics at the University of Kassel.

In 1985, Nöth was visiting professor at the University of Wisconsin–Green Bay in Green Bay, Wisconsin, United States, and in 1994 at the Pontifícia Universidade Católica de São Paulo in Brazil. Since 1999 he has been Director of the Scientific Centre for Cultural Research, University of Kassel, and President of the German Society for Semiotics. His Handbook of Semiotics (first published 1985) gives a comprehensive overview of the history and various orientations of semiotics and presents the most important representatives.

== Work ==
Nöth distinguishes between endophoric and exophoric iconicity, exophoric where the signifier is iconic with the signified, and endophoric where the signifier is iconic to another signifier. By endophoric he does not mean "trivial" recurrences like the letter e in one sentence being iconic with the letter 'e' in another sentence, which are not iconic signs of one another according to Nöth.

Textual endophoric iconicity can be divided between intratextual and intertextual. An example of intratextual endophroic iconicity is "the various recurrences of the word icon and its derivatives iconic or iconicity....Insofar as the morpheme icon refers back to earlier of its recurrences in the text and the traces of them in our memory, it is an iconic sign. Insofar as these morphemes constitute a coherent pattern of relations which create a line of mentation, they form a diagrammatic icon". Intertextual iconicity would include things like allusions, quotations etc.

Specific utterances which adhere to the rules of a language are iconic with one another. Phonemes can also be iconic with one another in that they could both be consonants or plosives. Another example is “the relationship between great, greater, greatest….since the morphological pattern of adjective grading is the same as in loud, louder, loudest”.

== Selected publications ==
- Winfried Nöth: Strukturen des Happenings. Olms, Hildesheim/New York 1972
- Winfried Nöth: Semiotik: Eine Einführung mit Beispielen für Reklameanalysen. Niemeyer, Tübingen 1975
- Winfried Nöth: Dynamik semiotischer Systeme: Vom altenglischen Zauberspruch zum illustrierten Werbetext. Metzler, Stuttgart 1977.
- Winfried Nöth: Literatursemiotische Analysen – zu Lewis Carrolls Alice-Büchern. Narr, Tübingen 1980
- Winfried Nöth: Handbuch der Semiotik. 2., vollständig neu bearbeitete Auflage. Metzler, Stuttgart/Weimar 2000
- Winfried Nöth/Nina Bishara/Britta Neitzel: Mediale Selbstreferenz: Grundlagen und Fallstudien zu Werbung, Computerspiel und Comics. Halem, Köln 2008.
