= Schweinfurt (district) =

Coordinates: 50°00′N 10°15′E

- District
- Flag Coat of arms
- Country: Germany
- State: Bavaria
- Adm. region: Lower Franconia
- Capital: Schweinfurt

Government
  - District admin.: Florian Töpper (SPD)

Area
  - Total: 842 km^{2} (325 sq mi)

Population (31 December 2025)
  - Total: 113,608
  - Density: 135/km^{2} (349/sq mi)
- Time zone: UTC+01:00 (CET)
  - Summer (DST): UTC+02:00 (CEST)
- Vehicle registration: SW
- Website: landkreis-schweinfurt.de

Schweinfurt is a Landkreis (district) in the northwestern part of Bavaria, Germany. Neighboring districts are (from the north clockwise) Bad Kissingen, Rhön-Grabfeld, Haßberge, Bamberg, Kitzingen, Würzburg and Main-Spessart. The district-free city Schweinfurt is surrounded by the district.

== Geography ==
Primary rivers in the district are the Main and the Wern. The district is located between several hill chains — Haßberge to the east, the Rhön in the northwest, the Spessart to the west and the Steigerwald in the southeast.

== History ==
The area of the district became part of Bavaria in 1814. In 1972 parts of the previous district Gerolzhofen (including the town Gerolzhofen) were merged with the district.

== Archaeology ==
In July 2022, archaeologists announced the discovery of a 3000-year-old clay figurine that might represent a prehistoric female water goddess. The 19 cm tall clay figurine's carefully modeled eye sockets, nose, lips, and chin are obviously visible and attractive. There are 5 perforated holes at the each side of the head possibly representing a hood decorated with metal rings. Clay figurine was supposedly 10 cm higher in its original shape because its anterior surface of the upper side was missing. The artifact was cleaned by using airbrush water technology and it is currently being studied by the Bavarian State Office for the Preservation of Monuments.

== Coat of arms ==
The coat of arms shows the imperial eagle in the top part as a symbol of the former imperial city Schweinfurt. The bottom part of the coat of arms shows the symbol of the Prince-Bishopric of Würzburg, which ruled a big part of the district until 1803.

== Towns and municipalities ==
Clickable map of towns and municipalities in the district

Märkte
1. Stadtlauringen
2. Werneck
Free municipalities
1. Bergrheinfeld
2. Dittelbrunn
3. Euerbach
4. Geldersheim
5. Gochsheim
6. Grafenrheinfeld
7. Grettstadt
8. Kolitzheim
9. Niederwerrn

10. Poppenhausen
11. Röthlein
12. Schonungen
13. Schwebheim
14. Sennfeld
15. Üchtelhausen
16. Waigolshausen
17. Wasserlosen

Verwaltungsgemeinschaften
1. Gerolzhofen; 1. Dingolshausen; 2. Donnersdorf; 3. Frankenwinheim; 4. Gerolzhofen^{1,2}; 5. Lülsfeld; 6. Michelau im Steigerwald; 7. Oberschwarzach^{3}; 8. Sulzheim	2. Schwanfeld; 1. Schwanfeld^{1}; 2. Wipfeld
^{1}seat of the Verwaltungsgemeinschaft; ^{2}town; ^{3}Markt
