= Roland Faber-Castell =

Roland Graf von Faber-Castell
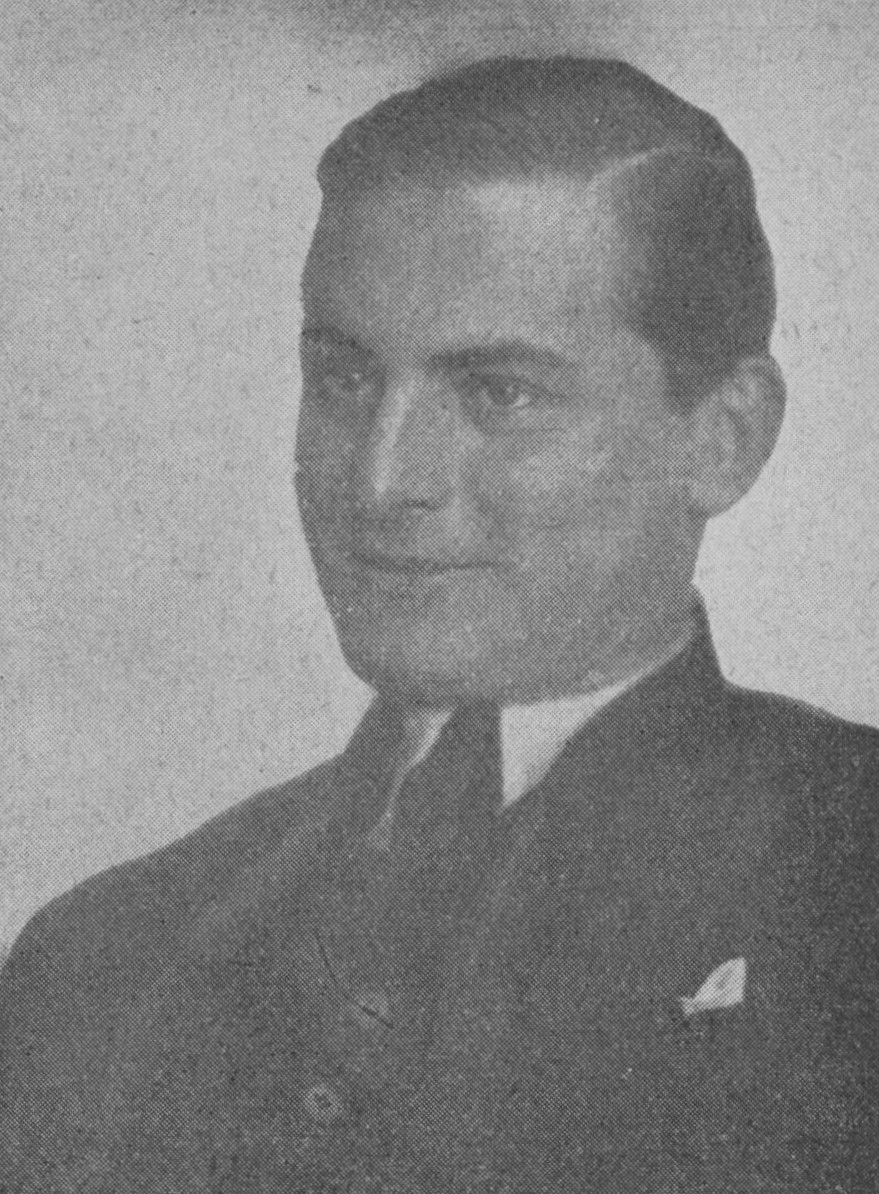
- Roland von Faber-Castell c. 1940
- Born: 21 April 1905; Schwarzenbruck, German Empire
- Died: 2 February 1978 (aged 72); Ansbach, West Germany
- Spouse: Alix-May von Frankenberg und Ludwigsburg (m. 1928; div. 1938) Katharina "Nina" Sprecher von Bernegg (m. 1938; div. 1969) Ursula Boden (m. 1969)
- Children: 8

Roland Graf von Faber-Castell (21 April 1905 – 2 February 1978) was a German nobleman and businessman who was the last sole proprietor of Faber-Castell. He was a scion of the Faber-Castell family.

== Early life and education ==
Faber-Castell was born 21 April 1905 in Schwarzenbruck in Bavaria, the fifth and youngest child, to Alexander Friedrich Lothar Graf zu Castell-Rüdenhausen (1866–1928) and Freiin Ottilie von Faber (1877–1944). He had four siblings; Elisabeth von Bismarck (née Faber-Castell; 1899–1986), Maria zu Hohenlohe-Oehringen (née Faber-Castell; formerly Lahmann; 1900–1985), Wolfgang-Lothar von Faber-Castell (1902–1903) and Irmengard von Faber-Castell (1904–1971).

== Personal life ==
On 23 January 1928, Faber-Castell married firstly to Alix-May von Frankenberg und Ludwigsburg (1907–1979), a maternal heiress to Sal. Oppenheim, who he divorced in 1938 in London, England. They had four children;

- Felicitas Ottilie Viktoria-Luise Marie Antoinette Berta von Faber-Castell (born 1929), a part-owner of Faber-Castell, married to Tschammer Wagner (born 1928), without issue.
- Erika-Elisabeth Wilhelmine Margarete von Faber-Castell (born 1930), a part-owner of Faber-Castell, married to Baron Edzard von Wedel-Jarlsberg (1928–1969), without issue.
- Alexander-Roland Wulf-Diether Konrad Alfred Lothar von Faber-Castell (1932–2004), married to Alke Lahmann (1936–2013). They had three children.
- Hubertus Alexander Wolfgang Rüdiger Emanuel Wilhelm von Faber-Castell (1934–2007), married firstly to Liselotte Baecker (born 1939), secondly to Baroness Adelheid von der Leyen zu Bloemersheim (1945–2010). He had two children from his first marriage, including Patrick Faber-Castell, and one from his second marriage. Faber-Castell was an owner of Faber-Castell and Sal. Oppenheim.

Faber-Castell married secondly to Katharina "Nina" Sprecher von Bernegg (1917–1994), a daughter of Anton Hercules Sprecher von Bernegg and Emilie Sprecher von Bernegg (née Diehl), of Swiss nobility. They had four children;

- Angela von Faber-Castell (1939–1991)
- Anton-Wolfgang Graf von Faber-Castell, colloquially Anton "Toni" von Faber-Castell (1941–2016), married firstly to Luxembourg-born Carla Mathilde Lamesch, married secondly to American Mary Elizabeth Hogan (born 1951). He had one son from his first marriage and three daughters from his second marriage. Since 1978 he was appointed as president of Faber-Castell.
- Andreas Wilhelm Christian Eberhard von Faber-Castell (born 1946), married to American Virginia Ruth Porter (born 1947). They had three children.
- Christian Albrecht Bernhard Konstantin von Faber-Castell (born 1950), married to Barbla Mani (born 1951). They had one daughter.

During the marriage, Nina had two illegitimate daughters through an affair with Swiss billionaire Paul Sacher, both of which carried the Faber-Castell name and were raised by their mother.

- Katharina Lucia Ricarda Emilie von Faber-Castell (born 1952), married to Bruno Guglielmetti (born 1951), without issue.
- Cornelia von Faber-Castell (born 1961), married firstly to Serge Perriard (born 1961), married secondly to Claudio Maira (born 1974).

After his divorce, he married thirdly in Stein, to Ursula Boden (1924–2003), to which he remained married until his death on 2 February 1978 aged 72.
