= Oppenheim family =

German Jewish banking family

The Oppenheim family is a German Jewish banking family which founded what was Europe's biggest private bank, Sal. Oppenheim.

== History of the family and raising to nobility ==
Salomon Oppenheim founded the banking firm Sal. Oppenheim in the late 18th century. Until its sale in 2009, Sal. Oppenheim was the largest privately owned investment/banking house in Europe, with assets under management of €348 billion.

The Oppenheim family also co-founded the German Colonia-Versicherung and sold their majority stake for 3 billion DM in 1989. 820 million DM were used to increase the equity of the bank, while the rest (over 2 billion DM) was paid out to the family.

In 1867, the family received nobility in Austria with the title of Baron and a year later, in 1868 they were admitted to nobility of Prussia, also with the title of Freiherr and became incorporated into the German nobility.

== Owner Family ==
The descendants of Eduard von Oppenheim (1831–1909) and Amalie Heuser (1835–1903) were the owners of the banking house until its sale to Deutsche Bank in 2009, unless an earlier sale within the family.

In August 1954, all limited partners’ shares were held by ten partners centered around Countess Emmy Arco-Valley (née Baroness von Oppenheim) and mother of Anton Count of Arco-Valley, Victoria von Frankenberg-Ludwigsdorf (née Baroness von Oppenheim), Dr. Stanislaus Count Strachwitz, Karin Baronin von Ullmann (née Baroness von Oppenheim), Ingrid Baroness von Oppenheim, Friedrich Carl Freiherr von Oppenheim, Count Wolf von Bredow, Clemens Carl Baron von Wrede, as well as the descendants of Robert Pferdmenges, Heinz Pferdmenges, and Ilse Bscher.

Victoria von Frankenberg-Ludwigsdorf died in the same year. Her daughter Alix-May Countess von Faber-Castell inherited her estate. Georg Baron von Ullmann, who had married Karin von Ullmann in 1953, became a new partner after 1954 and remained so until he died in 1972.

== Genealogy ==
- Hertz Salomon Oppenheim, Bonn's court factor and purveyor ⚭ Helene Seligmann
  - Salomon Oppenheim junior (1772–1828), founder of the Bank Oppenheim, ⚭ Therese Stein (Deigen Levi) (1775–1842), partner of the bank since 1828
    - Charlotte Oppenheim (1802–1836), married to Adolphe Ratisbonne (1801–1861) of the Ratisbonne banking family
      - Flore Ratisbonne (1824–1915), married to Alexandre Singer (son of David Singer)
      - Louis Ratisbonne (1827–1900)
    - Simon von Oppenheim (1803–1880), partner of the bank since 1828, ennobled in Austria in 1867, ⚭ Henriette Obermayer (1812–1885)
      - Eduard Oppenheim (1831–1909), Protestant since 1859, partner of the bank 1880–1904, ⚭ Amalie Heuser (1835–1903)
        - Ada von Oppenheim (1862–1944), ⚭ Graf Gisbert von Bredow (1859–1924)
          - Wolf Ferdinand Alfred Georg von Bredow (1934–1952)
            - Wolf Graf von Bredow
        - Emmy von Oppenheim (1869–1957) ⚭ Maximilian Graf von Arco-Valley (1849–1911)
          - Anton Graf von Arco-Valley (1897–1945)
            - Maria von Arco-Valley (1935–1987)
            - Max Joseph von Arco-Valley (1942-1942)
        - Victoria von Oppenheim (1871-1954) ⚭ Alexander von Frankenberg und Ludwigsdorf (1861-1911)
          - Alix-May von Frankenberg und Ludwigsdorf (1907-1979) ⚭ Roland Graf von Faber-Castell (1905-1978)
            - Hubertus Graf von Faber-Castell (1934-2007) ⚭ 1) Liselotte Baecker (born 1939) ⚭ 2) Adelheid Freiin von der Leyen zu Bloemersheim (1945-2010)
              - Caroline Gräfin von Faber-Castell (born 1961) ⚭ Dr. Michael Gotzens (born 1958)
                - Antonia-Sophie Gotzens
                - Alessandra-Louisa Gotzens
                - Nicholas Gotzens
              - Patrick Graf von Faber-Castell (born 1965) ⚭ Mariella Ahrens (born 1969)
                - Lucia von Faber-Castell (born 2007)
              - Floria Franziska Gräfin von Faber-Castell (born 1972) ⚭ Donatus Landgrave of Hesse (born 1966)
                - Paulina von Hessen
                - Moritz von Hessen
                - August von Hessen
        - Simon von Oppenheim (1864–1932), partner of the bank sice 1893, ⚭ Florence Mathews Hutchins (1868–1935)
          - Eberhard (1890–1962), partner of the bank 1922–1932, ⚭ 1) Anneliese Oetker (1904–1989), divorced in 1929; ⚭ 2) Helene Gräfin von Hardenberg (1910–1996)
            - Manfred (1924–1996), partner of the bank 1956–1993, ⚭ Carla Siempelkamp (born 1926)
              - Nicolaus von Oppenheim (born 1956)
                - Laura von Oppenheim
                - Franziska von Oppenheim
                - Theresa von Oppenheim (born 1995)
          - Waldemar von Oppenheim (1894–1952), partner of the bank 1922–1952, ⚭ Gabriele Goldschmidt (1902–1988)
            - Karin von Oppenheim (1922–2009), Georg von Ullmann (1922–1972), partner of the bank 1954–1972
              - Georg von Ullmann (born 1953) ⚭ Corinna van Meeteren
                - Leon von Ullmann
                - Béla von Ullmann
                - Philip von Ullmann
              - Ilona von Ullmann (born 1953) ⚭ Matthias Graf von Krockow (born 1949)
                - Caroline Gräfin von Krockow
          - Friedrich Carl von Oppenheim (1900–1978), partner of the bank 1929–1978 ⚭ Ruth Freiin von Zedlitz und Leipe (1908–1988)
            - Alfred Freiherr von Oppenheim (1934–2005), partner of the bank 1964–1993, ⚭ Jeanne Wahl (born 1941)
              - Victoria von Oppenheim ⚭ Aurel Scheibler
                - Cosima Scheibler
                - Constantin Scheibler
                - Victor Scheibler
              - Christopher von Oppenheim (born 1965) ⚭ Gabriele Mittelsten-Scheid
                - August von Oppenheim
                - Hugo von Oppenheim
              - Alexandra von Oppenheim ⚭ Hans-Christoph Scheibler
            - Gisela von Oppenheim (1936-2023) ⚭ Guillermo von Sanden (1931-2017)
              - Federico von Sanden (born 1969) ⚭ Euphemie Gräfin Zech-Burkesroda (born 1968)
                - Felizitas von Sanden (born 1999)
                - Karl von Sanden (born 2001)
              - Christian von Sanden (born 1973) ⚭ Janina Becker (born 1972)
                - Pia von Sanden (born 2006)
                - Maximilian von Sanden (born 2009)
            - Friedrich Carl von Oppenheim (born 1937) ⚭ 1) Loyse de Rham (killed in an accident); 2) Marie-Rose von Merey, gesch. van Exter
              - Leonie von Oppenheim ⚭ Charles Booth-Clibborn
                - Edwina Booth-Clibborn
                - Celeste Booth-Clibborn
                - Evelyn Booth-Clibborn
                - Gisele Booth-Clibborn
                - Theodore Booth-Clibborn
              - Simon von Oppenheim (born 1970)
                - Ludmilla von Oppenheim
                - Waldemar von Oppenheim
              - Florian von Oppenheim (born 1974)
      - Albert (1834–1912), catholic since 1858, partner of the bank 1880–1904, ⚭ Paula Engels (1837–1919)
        - Max von Oppenheim (1860–1946), diplomat and orientalist
        - Emil (1862–1956), partner of the bank 1893–1912 ⚭ Maria Pergler von Perglas (1871–1959)
        - Clara Maria Hubertina (1870–1959) ⚭ Guido Graf von Matuschka-Greiffenclau (1847–1924)
      - Henry (1835–1912) partner of the bank ⚭ Isabella Georgina Butler
    - Abraham (1804–1878), partner of the bank since 1828, nominated 1868 preußischer Freiherr in 1868 ⚭ Charlotte Beyfus (1811–1887)
    - Eveline Oppenheim (1805–1886), married to Ferdinand von Kusserow
      - Heinrich von Kusserow
        - Sophie von Kusserow (1869–1959)
          - Karlfried Graf Dürckheim
    - Dagobert Oppenheim (1809–1889)
    - Betty Oppenheim (Bertha Hertz) ⚭ Heinrich David Hertz (born as Hertz Hertz)
      - Gustav Ferdinand Hertz (born as David Gustav Hertz) ⚭ Anna Elisabeth Pfefferkorn
        - Heinrich Hertz
        - Gustav Theodor Hertz ⚭ Auguste Arning
          - Gustav Ludwig Hertz ⚭ Ellen Dihlmann
            - Carl Hellmuth Hertz
              - Hans Hertz
