= Faber-Castell family =

German entrepreneurial noble family

Faber-Castell family Familie Faber-Castell
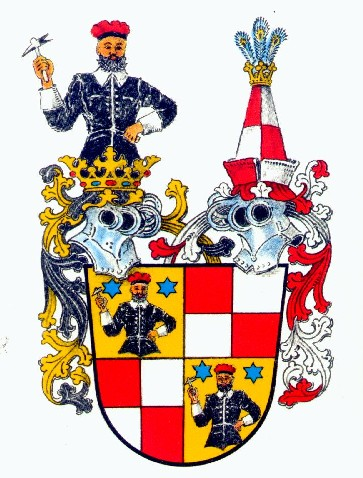
- Arms of the Counts of Faber-Castell
- Country: Germany
- Current region: Stein bei Nürnberg
- Origin: Germany
- Founded: 1761; 265 years ago
- Founder: Kaspar Faber
- Seat: Stein, Bavaria
- Connected members: Lothar von Faber; Anton Faber-Castell
- Connected families: Oppenheim family

The Faber-Castell family is a German noble family of entrepreneurs linked to the Faber-Castell manufacturing company. The Faber family originated from Stein bei Nürnberg in Bavaria, and it founded the Faber pencil-making business in 1761 and the Nürnberger Versicherung in 1884. The heiress of the Fabers married a member of the Castell-Rüdenhausen comital family in 1898, and this union created a morganatic branch of the House of Castell-Rüdenhausen that became known as the Faber-Castell family.

== History ==
Founded in 1761 by Kaspar Faber, A.W. Faber Bleystiftwerke made pencils. One of his successors was Johann Lothar, Freiherr von Faber; his granddaughter and heiress Ottilie Freiin von Faber married Alexander Graf zu Castell-Rüdenhausen in 1898. From them originated the new family name of Faber-Castell, after Alexander Graf zu Castell-Rüdenhausen changed his name to Alexander Graf von Faber-Castell. In 1905, the pencil brand "Castell" was introduced for particularly high quality pencils.

Roland Graf von Faber-Castell (1905–1978) was the last sole heir to the Faber-Castell fortune. The Count successfully merged the companies Faber-Castell and Johann Faber. Roland was CEO of Faber-Castell for 50 years. Count Roland's first wife, Alix-May (1907–1979) was born into the Cologne-based banking dynasty Oppenheim. The marriage was disrupted through antisemitic attacks, because her grandfather, prominent banker Eduard von Oppenheim was a born Jew. Eduard married Amalie Heuser, from a Protestant family and converted to Lutheranism. Yet, Roland and Alix-May were victims of constant attacks. In 1935 Graf Roland and Alix-May divorced after the magazine Der Stürmer criticized her luxurious lifestyle and the words 'Die Oppenheim, das Judenschwein, muss raus aus Stein' (Oppenheim, the Jew-pig, has to leave Stein) were written on the family's castle, Faberschloss.

Furthermore, Anton-Wolfgang Graf von Faber-Castell (1941–2016), son from Roland's second marriage with Katharina Sprecher von Bernegg, was CEO and the owning family's representative for nearly 40 years in the eighth generation. In that context, Graf Anton-Wolfgang bought out many of his siblings and their children to gain decisive power. He worked for a long time with his younger brother, Andreas Graf von Faber-Castell, for the family business. Andreas acted from Australia and dealt largely with the Asian market. A son from the first marriage of Roland von Faber-Castell and his wife Alix-May, was Hubertus von Faber-Castell. Hubertus was a pioneer in Chinese commercial television and has been awarded, as the first European in history, the honorary citizenship of China's capital city Beijing. The mother of Hubertus was, among other things, co-owner of Europe's biggest private bank, Sal. Oppenheim Jr & Cie. Hubertus von Faber-Castell's former wife Liselotte von Faber-Castell went on to marry the industrialist Hans-Joachim Hünnebeck. His son, Patrick Graf von Faber-Castell, married the German actress Mariella Ahrens under a large media presence at Faber-Castell castle, in 2007.

Swiss billionaire Paul Sacher (1906–1999), majority shareholder of the pharmaceuticals company Hoffmann-La Roche, was father to Katharina and Cornelia von Faber-Castell.

Patrick von Faber-Castell and his siblings, Floria-Franziska of Hesse and Caroline Gotzens, own one of the most important collections of silver and jewellery in Germany. Most of the pieces are available to the public in various German museums. The majority of the private collection has been recorded by the Kunstmuseum Köln and published under the name "A Rhenish Silver Treasure - Jewelry and Equipment from Private Ownership".

== Family members ==
- Alexander Friedrich Lothar von Faber-Castell (Sole owner Faber-Castell) (but retains the original title for himself, his second wife and son); Born July 6, 1866, in Rüdenhausen; † April 11, 1928, in Oberstdorf; ∞ I. (February 28, 1898, in Stein, 0 | 0 1918) Ottilie von Faber, born September 6, 1877, in Stein; † September 28, 1944, in Nuremberg; II. (July 15, 1920, in Stein) Countess Margaretha Zedtwitz of Moravan and Duppau, born September 30, 1886, in Duppau; † October 25, 1973, in Castle Schwanberg, Schwanberg
  - Elisabeth Bertha Emma Ottilie Johanna Sophie Marie Luitgard von Faber-Castell (born Stein, January 15, 1899; † Gmunden, February 11, 1986); ∞ I. Munich, December 21, 1920 0 | 0 1930 Hubert Frommel (born Munich, October 25, 1899; † Munich, February 24, 1970); ∞ II. Stein, January 31, 1933, Nikolaus Graf von Bismarck-Schönhausen (born Königsberg, May 26, 1896; † Berlin, June 20, 1940); ∞ III. Viechtwang, July 15, 1947, Max Buchegger (born Viechtwang, February 23, 1919; † May 30, 1968)
  - Marie Gabrielle "Mariella" Hedwig Gräfin von Faber-Castell (born Stein, August 31, 1900; † Schloss Appelhof, November 26, 1985); ∞ I. Stein, May 17, 1920 0 | 0 1931) Max Hugo Prinz zu Hohenlohe-Oehringen (born Berlin, March 25, 1893; † Schrozberg, October 17, 1951); ∞ II. Berlin, April 24, 1935, Lüder Lahmann (born Dresden-Weisser Hirsch, December 31, 1914; † Frankfurt, July 18, 1959)
  - Irmengard Luise Bertha Clementine von Faber-Castell (born Schwarzenbruck, January 11, 1904; † Salou, Spain, October 14, 1972); ∞ I. Würzburg, May 27, 1926 0 | 0 1939) Friedrich Wilhelm Hornstein (born Munich, July 29, 1895; † Konstanz, October 9, 1965); ∞ II. Hadamar, August 31, 1958, Karl-Heinz Licht (born Berlin, February 1, 1920; † Salou, Spain, January 6, 1968)
  - (I.) Roland Lothar Wolfgang Christian Ernst Wilhelm von Faber-Castell (Sole owner Faber-Castell) * April 21, 1905, in Schwarzenbruck; † February 2, 1978, in Ansbach; ∞ I. (January 23, 1928, in London, 0 | 0 1935) Alix-May of Frankenberg and Ludwigsdorf, born September 20, 1907, in Munich; † December 19, 1979, in Polop, Spain; ∞ II. (December 8, 1938, in Stein, 0 | 0 1969) Katharina Sprecher von Bernegg, * June 24, 1917, in Zurich; † April 22, 1994, in Küsnacht; ∞ III. (14 August 1969 in Stein) Ursula Boden, born October 4, 1924, in Wurzen; † November 8, 2003, in Vienna
    - Felicitas Ottilie Viktoria-Luise Marie Antoinette Berta von Faber-Castell (Owner Faber-Castell) * July 10, 1929, in Stein; ∞ (July 20, 1966, in Munich) Tschammer Wagner, born April 11, 1928, in Neisse
    - Erika-Elisabeth Wilhelmine Margarete von Faber-Castell (Owner Faber-Castell) (born 2 September 1930 in Dürrenhembach); ∞ (Stein, November 16, 1953) Baron Edzard von Wedel-Jarlsberg, born February 15, 1924, in Göttingen; † June 12, 1969, in Zurich
    - Alexander-Roland Wulf-Diether Konrad Alfred Lothar von Faber-Castell (born Stein, April 27, 1932; † Haibach, Upper Austria, September 22, 2004); ∞ Appelhof bei Nürnberg, July 29, 1958 0 | 0 1962) Alke Lahmann (born Berlin-Wilmersdorf, October 25, 1936)
      - Constantin Alexander Christian von Faber-Castell (born Herrsching am Ammersee, November 5, 1958); ∞ Erfurt, June 26, 1992, Christin Gloczinski (born Erfurt, June 9, 1966)
        - Camilla Marie Marielle Alke Sigrid von Faber-Castell (born Erfurt, October 8, 1992)
      - Lothar Alexander Carl-Otto Lüder von Faber-Castell (born Nürnberg, March 29, 1960); ∞ Nürnberg, November 20, 1992, Petra Götz (born Nürnberg, December 8, 1965)
        - Maximilian von Faber-Castell (born Fürth bei Nürnberg, November 26, 1993)
      - Andrea Margarita Alke Sophie Maria Gabriela Ellen Julia von Faber-Castell (born Nürnberg, September 16, 1961); ∞ Thalmässig, August 27, 1999, Alexander Beckstein (born Nürnberg, May 18, 1970)
    - Hubertus Alexander Wolfgang Rüdiger Emanuel Wilhelm von Faber-Castell (Owner Faber-Castell & Bankhaus Sal. Oppenheim) * April 8, 1934, in Munich; † January 29, 2007; ∞ I. (May 20, 1960, in Frankfurt am Main, 0 | 0 1967) Liselotte Baecker Hünnebeck (Owner Hünnebeck), born August 20, 1939, in Frankfurt am Main; ∞ II. (March 15, 1970, in Meerbusch (civ.), March 21, 1970, in Meerbusch (rel.), 0 | 0 1982) Adelheid, Baroness von der Leyen zu Bloemersheim, born November 6, 1945, in Homberg; † May 23, 2010, in Wiesbaden
      - Caroline Elisabeth Renate Ottilie von Faber-Castell (Owner Faber-Castell & Bankhaus Sal. Oppenheim) * August 20, 1961, in Düsseldorf; ∞ (September 22, 1989, in Düsseldorf (civ.), July 29, 1990, in Castle Stein, Stein, (rel.)) Michael Gotzens, born March 3, 1958, in Düsseldorf
        - Antonia-Sophie Gotzens
        - Alessandra-Louisa Gotzens
        - Nicholas Gotzens
      - Patrick Alexander Hubertus von Faber-Castell (Owner Faber-Castell & Bankhaus Sal. Oppenheim) * June 4, 1965, in Düsseldorf; ∞ (December 12, 2006, in New York City (civ.), July 7, 2007, in Castle Stein, Stein, 0 | 0 2015) Mariella Ahrens, born April 2, 1969, in Leningrad, Soviet Union
        - Lucia Marie Christina von Faber-Castell (born Berlin, March 2007)
      - Floria-Franziska Marie-Luise Erika von Faber-Castell (Owner Faber-Castell & Bankhaus Sal. Oppenheim) * 14 October 1974, in Düsseldorf; ∞ (25 April 2003, in Wiesbaden (civ.); 17 May 2003, in Kronberg (rel.)) Heinrich Donatus, Prince and Landgrave of Hesse, born 17 October 1966, in Kiel
        - Paulina Elisabeth Adelheid Tatiana Suzanne Prinzessin von Hessen (born Frankfurt, 26 March 2007), twin with the below
        - Moritz Ludwig Georg Wolf Erbprinz von Hessen (born Frankfurt, 26 March 2007), twin with the above
        - August Siegfried Hubertus Felix Prinz von Hessen (born Frankfurt, 24 August 2012)
    - Angela Katharina Edith Alexandra von Faber-Castell (Owner Faber-Castell) * 4 July 1939 in Nuremberg; † August 29, 1991, in Munich; ∞ (August 29, 1959, in Chêne-Bougeries, Switzerland (civ.), October 17, 1959, in Stein (rel.), 0 | 0 1986) Heinrich von Kölichen, born August 18, 1926, in Kittletztreben; † June 6, 1991, in Munich
    - Anton-Wolfgang "Toni" Lothar Andreas von Faber-Castell (Owner Faber-Castell, as well as Chairman of the Board) * June 7, 1941, in Bamberg; † January 21, 2016, in Houston, Texas; ∞ I. (June 16, 1986, in Las Vegas, 0 | 0 1986) Carla Mathilde Lamesch, born July 15, 1942, in Luxembourg; † May 18, 2010, in Little Rock; ∞ II. (December 12, 1987, in Stein) Mary Elizabeth Hogan, born November 25, 1951, in St. Louis, Missouri
      - Married, Charles Alexander von Faber-Castell (Owner Faber-Castell) (born 1980 in Zurich); ∞ (September 30, 2011, in Stein (civ.), May 26, 2012, in Stein (rel.)) Melissa Eliyeşil, (born 1984 in Istanbul)
        - Leonhard Alexander Anton-Wolfgang von Faber-Castell (born 2016)
        - Carla Victoria von Faber-Castell (born 2017)
      - Katharina Elisabeth von Faber-Castell (born New York City 1988)
      - Victoria Maria Cornelia Ottilie von Faber-Castell (born New York 1996), twin with the below
      - Sarah Anne Angela Nadine von Faber-Castell (born New York 1996), twin with the above
    - Andreas Wilhelm Christian Eberhard von Faber-Castell (Owner Faber-Castell) * June 1, 1946, in Dürrenhembach; ∞ (January 6, 1973, in Princeton, New Jersey) Virginia Ruth Porter, born January 31, 1947, in Trenton, New Jersey
      - Natalie Grace Anna Katharina von Faber-Castell (born 1976 in Sydney); ∞ (October 8, 2005, in Stein) Salvatore Lacaria, born December 16, 1968
      - Alea Virginia Andrea Christina von Faber-Castell (born 1978 in Sydney); ∞ (January 8, 2006, in Sydney) Brian Martin McGabhan
      - Anton Andreas Wilhelm Christian Alexander von Faber-Castell (born 1983 in Sydney); ∞ (May 16, 2014 (civ.), May 17, 2014 (rel.)) Kate Stahl
    - Christian Albrecht Bernhard Konstantin von Faber-Castell (born May 17, 1950, in Constance); ∞ (11 October 1987 in Küsnacht) Barbla Mani, born November 4, 1951, in Thusis, Switzerland
      - Alexandra von Faber-Castell (born Zurich, 1991)
    - Katharina Lucia Ricarda Emilie von Faber-Castell (born Zurich, August 12, 1952); ∞ Zurich, August 25, 1989, Bruno Guglielmetti (born Zurich, February 12, 1951)
    - Cornelia von Faber-Castell (born Zurich, August 27, 1961); ∞ I. Küsnacht, August 30, 1991 0 | 0 2006) Serge Perriard (born Zurich, July 11, 1961); ∞ II. Küssnacht, September 2, 2011, Claudio Maira (born Wadenswil, November 7, 1974)

== See also ==
- Kaspar Faber
- Lothar von Faber
- Faber-Castell
- Patrick von Faber-Castell
- Hubertus Faber-Castell
- Heinrich Donatus von Hessen
- Oppenheim family
- Caroline von Faber-Castell-Gotzens
- Mariella Ahrens
- Anton-Wolfgang von Faber-Castell
- Hans-Joachim Hünnebeck
- Paul Sacher
