= Hubertus Faber-Castell =

German billionaire

Hubertus Count of Faber-Castell
- Born: Hubertus Alexander Wolfgang Rüdiger Emanuel Wilhelm Count von Faber-Castell; 8 April 1934
- Died: January 29, 2007 (aged 72)
- Spouse: 3
- Children: 3
- Relatives: Roland Count von Faber-Castell (father) Victoria von Oppenheim (grandmother) Donatus Prince of Hesse (son-in-law)

Hubertus Alexander Wolfgang Rüdiger Emanuel Wilhelm von Faber-Castell colloquially Hubertus von Faber-Castell (8 April 1934 – 29 January 2007) was a German billionaire businessman and heir of the Faber-Castell family. He was an honorary citizen of Beijing.

== Early life and education ==
Faber-Castell was born 8 April 1934 in Stein, Bavaria near Nuremberg to Roland von Faber-Castell and his first wife Alix-May von Faber-Castell (née von Frankenberg und Ludwigsdorf; 1907–1979).

On his paternal side he hailed from the Faber-Castell family, his father being sole owner of Faber-Castell. His maternal family was partly of German nobility and partly of German Jewish descent. His maternal grandmother was Victoria von Oppenheim, daughter of Eduard von Oppenheim and founder of Gestüt Schlenderhan.

== Family ==
Hubertus Count von Faber-Castell was son to two German dynasties. His father, Roland Count von Faber-Castell, was sole owner of today's Faber-Castell AG. On his maternal side, Alix-May von Frankenberg and Ludwigsdorf, belonged to the owning family of Europe's biggest private bank Sal. Oppenheim Jr. & Cie. Count Hubertus briefly worked in both family businesses. After a dispute with his father, he left the Faber-Castell family holdings and sold most of his stake in the company to his younger brother. From there on, the Franconian stationery manufacturer was managed by his younger brother Anton-Wolfgang Count von Faber-Castell. Count Hubertus was silent owner at the Faber-Castell Company, as well as the bank Sal. Oppenheim. The combined stakes in the two corporations, made him a billionaire. Hubertus had three children from two different marriages:

- Patrick Count von Faber-Castell, husband of the German actress Mariella Ahrens from his first marriage.
- German-Swiss Caroline Countess of Faber-Castell-Gotzens from his first marriage.
- Floria-Franziska Princess von Hessen is married to the Head of the House of Hesse, Donatus from his second marriage.

== China ==
Faber-Castell moved to Asia, where he pioneered the set up of commercial television in China. When finalised, Count Hubertus sold his 50 percent stake to the Chinese Government for an undisclosed sum. Count Hubertus was publicly titled by the government as 'great friend of China', later the Count was honored to be the first European honorary citizen of the city of Beijing.

== See also ==
- Faber-Castell family
- Oppenheim family
- House of Hesse
