= Caroline Gotzens =

German-Swiss industrial heiress

- Born: Caroline Elisabeth Renate Ottilie Gräfin von Faber-Castell; 20 August 1961 (age 65); Stein, Germany
- Occupations: Industrial heiress and art collector

Caroline Gotzens (born 20 August 1961, in Stein near Nuremberg, née Caroline Elisabeth Renate Ottilie Gräfin [Countess] von Faber-Castell) is a German-Swiss industrial heiress and art collector. She is a family member of the Cologne-based banking dynasty Oppenheim, as well as of the Frankish pencil dynasty Faber-Castell.

== Family ==
Gotzens is an 8th generation family member of the Cologne-based banking dynasty von Oppenheim, as well as 9th generation member of the Faber-Castell founding family. She grew up in Klamm Castle in Tyrol and never lived in the family castle Faberschloss in Bavaria. She is widely related to the princely families Castell-Castell and Castell-Rüdenhausen.

She is married to Düsseldorf-based entrepreneur Dr Michael Gotzens. The couple has three grown children, Antonia-Sophie, Alessandra-Louisa and Nicholas Gotzens. Gotzens is the daughter of German billionaire Count Hubertus von Faber-Castell (died 2007) and Countess Liselotte Faber-Castell (née Baecker, born 1939 in Frankfurt). Her mother was married for the second time to famous Rhenish industrialist and sole owner of Hünnebeck, Hajo Hünnebeck. After the latter's death and the resulting sale of the company, a German law was named after Hünnebeck, as the case filled a loophole of legal tax avoidance for the beneficiaries. Hünnebeck is now part of the Harsco Corporation. Gotzens's father, Count Hubertus von Faber-Castell, brought commercial television to China and is the only European honorary citizen of Beijing. Her younger sister Floria is married to Donatus Prince of Hesse, the head of the “Hessische Hausstiftung” (the Hesse family's foundation), one of the most important family foundations of Germany.

Gotzens was raised between her paternal grandparents, Roland Count von Faber-Castell (1905-1978) and Alix-May (1907-1979). In 1935 Graf Roland and Alix-May divorced after the magazine Der Stürmer criticized her luxurious lifestyle and the words 'Die Oppenheim, das Judenschwein, muss raus aus Stein' (Oppenheim, the Jew-pig, has to leave Stein) were written on the family's castle, Faberschloss. Her grandmother, Alix-May, belonging to the German-Jewish banking dynasty Oppenheim, was in the 1930s a victim of constant anti-Semitic attacks. In order to remain in control of the family’s bank, she and her cousins stayed in Germany. Later, the Oppenheim family had to hide to escape Nazi persecution. Gotzens lived with her grandmother in Switzerland until her death in 1979.

== Art collection ==
Her ancestors were famous for collecting art. After the division of the estate, Gotzens obtained ownership of many important pieces. As heir to her grandmother Alix-May, Gotzens litigates in court to receive back the painting 'Die Malkunst' of Jan Vermeer. The painting was allegedly sold under duress by her step-grandfather to Adolf Hitler. The painting is estimated to be worth around €150 million to €400 million and is regarded as the most expensive art piece in Austria. Gotzens is the owner of one of the most important silver and jewellery collections in Germany. Most of the pieces are available to the public in various German museums. Public parts of the private collection have been recorded by the Kunstmuseum Köln under the name "Ein rheinischer Silberschatz-Schmuck und Gerät aus Privatbesitz" (A Rhenish Silver Treasure - Jewellery and Appliances from Private Ownership).

== See also ==
- Oppenheim Family
- Faber-Castell Family
