= Anton-Wolfgang Graf von Faber-Castell =

German entrepreneur

Anton-Wolfgang Lothar Andreas Graf von Faber-Castell
- Born: June 7, 1941; Bamberg, Germany
- Died: January 21, 2016 (aged 74); Houston, Texas
- Occupation: Entrepreneur
- Spouses: Carla Mathilde Lamesch (m. 1986; div. 1986); Mary Elizabeth Hogan (m. 1987)
- Children: 4
- Parents: Roland Graf von Faber-Castell (father); Katharina Sprecher von Bernegg (mother)

Anton-Wolfgang "Toni" Lothar Andreas Graf von Faber-Castell (June 7, 1941, in Bamberg – January 21, 2016, in Houston, Texas) was a German entrepreneur and member of the Faber-Castell industrial and noble family. He was the eighth-generation chairman of the board of the stationery manufacturer Faber-Castell for nearly 40 years.

== Family ==
Anton-Wolfgang was born in 1941, the son of the last sole owner of Faber-Castell AG, Roland Graf von Faber-Castell (1905-1978) and his second wife Katharina Sprecher von Bernegg (1917-1994). Count Roland's first wife, Alix-May (1907–1979) was born into the Cologne-based banking dynasty Oppenheim. The marriage was disrupted through antisemitic attacks because her grandfather, prominent banker Eduard von Oppenheim was a born Jew. Eduard married Amalie Heuser, from a Protestant family and converted to Lutheranism. Yet, Roland and Alix-May were victims of constant attacks. In 1935 Graf Roland and Alix-May divorced after the magazine Der Stürmer criticized her luxurious lifestyle and the words 'Die Oppenheim, das Judenschwein, muss raus aus Stein' (Oppenheim, the Jew-pig, has to leave Stein) were written on the family's castle, Faberschloss. Further, Anton-Wolfgang Graf von Faber-Castell was CEO and the owning family's representative for nearly 40 years in the eighth generation. In that context, Graf Anton-Wolfgang bought out many of his siblings and their children in order to gain decisive power. He worked for a long time with his younger brother, Andreas Graf von Faber-Castell, for the family business. Andreas acted from Australia and dealt largely with the Asian market. The Swiss journalist Christian Graf von Faber-Castell also came from the marriage with Sprecher von Bernegg.

Faber-Castell was married on June 16, 1986, in Las Vegas to Carla Mathilde Lamesch (July 15, 1942 – May 18, 2010) of Luxembourg between June and October 1986. From this union came his son Charles Alexander (born 1980), who was born before the marriage in Zurich in 1980. She died in Little Rock. He married his second wife, Mary Elizabeth Hogan (born November 25, 1951, in St. Louis, Missouri), in Stein, Bavaria, on December 12, 1987. The couple had three daughters, including twins, in 1988 and the latters in 1996. His son married in Stein civilly on September 30, 2011, and religiously on May 26, 2012 Melissa Eliyeşil, born in 1984 in Istanbul, by whom he had two children, Leonhard Alexander Anton-Wolfgang, born April 14, 2016, and Carla Victoria, born June 7, 2017.

== Life ==
After attending the Swiss Lyceum Alpinum Zuoz, he studied law at the University of Zurich from 1966. He then completed a commercial apprenticeship in the family business and attended the IMEDE management school in Lausanne from 1968 to 1972. In 1972, he joined the financial house Credit Swiss White Weld as an investment banker and worked in New York and London. In 1975, he moved up to manage the London branch of the investment bank Crédit Suisse First Boston. In the same year, his father appointed him to the management of A. W. Faber-Castell GmbH. In 1978, following his father's death, he became sole managing partner and, when the company became a stock corporation in 2000, Chairman of the Board of Management. Under his leadership, the company's international expansion continued.

In 2012, the fortune of Anton-Wolfgang Graf von Faber-Castell was estimated by the German Manager Magazin to be around 350 million euros, placing him 312th on the list of the richest Germans.

He was honorary consul of the Federative Republic of Brazil, with the consulate located in the company building.

Anton-Wolfgang von Faber-Castell died on January 21, 2016, at the age of 74, after a serious illness in Houston, Texas. He was survived by his four children, Charles, Katharina, Sarah, and Victoria.

== Honors and awards ==
- Honorary senator of the Academy of Fine Arts Nuremberg
- Eco-manager of the year (2008)
- Cross of Merit 1st Class of the Order of Merit of the Federal Republic of Germany (2010)
- Medal of Honor 2012 of the Nuremberg Chamber of Industry and Commerce
- G-E-M Award 2013
