= Graf von Faber-Castell =

Brand of luxury writing instruments

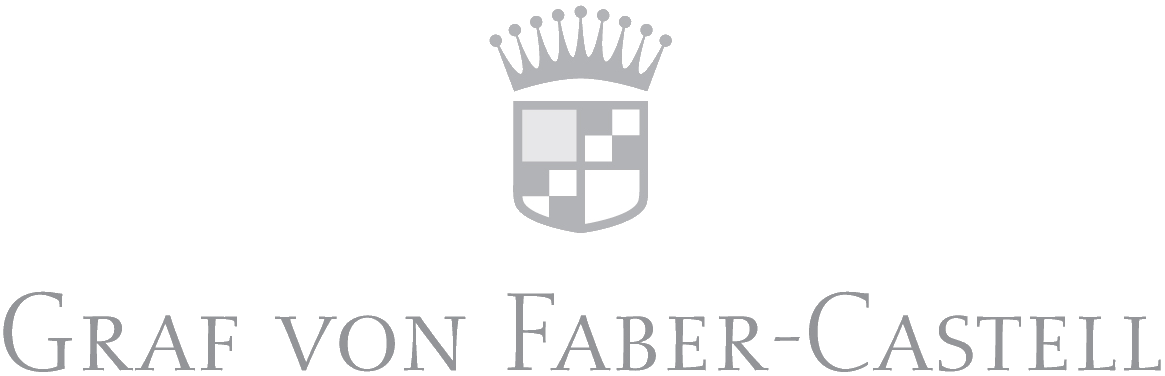
- Product type: Luxury writing instruments
- Current owner: Faber-Castell
- Produced by: Faber-Castell
- Country: Germany
- Introduced: 1993; 33 years ago
- Website: graf-von-faber-castell.com

Graf von Faber-Castell is a brand of writing implements from the German stationery manufacturer Faber-Castell. It includes a line of pencils, mechanical pencils, fountain pens, and rollerball pens.

The Graf von Faber-Castell line includes high end writing instruments made with luxury materials such as ebony and precious resin.

The Graf von Faber-Castell brand was launched in 1993 by Count Anton-Wolfgang von Faber-Castell, the eighth-generation heir to the Faber-Castell family.

== Products ==
=== Pencils ===
Graf von Faber-Castell sells the "Perfect Pencil", a sort of pencil extender with an integrated sharpener. The end of the pencil houses an eraser, and has a metal cap. Placing the pencil with the point in the extender makes it possible to then use the extender's clip on a pocket, without worrying about the pencil marking clothes or making holes. There are several versions of the Perfect Pencil, in plastic, platinum-plated metal, and sterling silver.

=== Mechanical pencils ===
Graf von Faber-Castell produces a range of premium mechanical pencils designed to complement their fountain, ballpoint pens, and rollerball pens. The classic line features 0.7mm twist action mechanical pencils with barrels encased in precious woods such as ebony, pernambuco, grenadilla and macassar or in high-quality resins matching their pen counterparts. Each mechanical pencil features the brand's distinctive fluted design and high-quality metal accents.

=== Pens ===
Graf von Faber-Castell offers a variety of fountain pens. Graf von Faber-Castell fountain pens employ a cartridge/converter filling system, which allows the pen to be filled with ink using either an ink bottle or with self-contained, hassle free cartridges. The models offered come in a variety of finishes, such as wood, lacquered metal, amongst other finishes. Fountain pen nibs are either 18K gold nibs, or polished stainless steel with a hard-wearing iridium metal tip.

Graf von Faber-Castell also sells twist action ballpoint pens, with a similar system to its mechanical pencil. These often belong to a line of products, completing the set of fountain pens, ballpoint pens, rollerballs and mechanical pencils.

==== Series ====
There have also been variations for the casings. The classic series offers slow growth hard wood surfaces in ebony, pernambuco and grenadilla. The Intuition series offers glossy black resin, the Guilloche series offered carved dyed resin in coral, indigo, sahara, and black, as well as several woods.

==== "Pen of the Year" ====
Since 2003, the Graf von Faber-Castell line has included limited edition fountain pens named the "Pen of the Year", usually inspired by historical events. Those pencils are hand-crafted made. Each has a nib of 18 carat bicolor gold with a barrel of exotic materials.

- 2003-2012 Nature's Luxury series
- 2003 "Pen of the Year" - snakewood
- 2004 "Pen of the Year" - amber and platinum
- 2005 "Pen of the Year" - stingray leather
- 2006 "Pen of the Year" - ebony and mammoth ivory
- 2007 "Pen of the Year" - petrified wood
- 2008 "Pen of the Year" - Indian satinwood
- 2009 "Pen of the Year" - horsehair
- 2010 "Pen of the Year" - walnut wood
- 2011 "Pen of the Year" - jade, MSRP 3500 USD
- 2012 "Pen of the Year" - oak wood
- 2014-2024 Pillars of History series
- 2014 Catherine Palace
- 2015 "Sanssouci" - green Silesian serpentines
- 2016 "Schloss Schönbrunn Vienna"
- 2017 "Vikings"
- 2018 "Imperium Romanum"
- 2019 "Samurai"
- 2020 "Sparta"
- 2021 "Knights"
- 2022 "Aztec"
- 2023 "Ancient Egypt"
- 2024 "Ottoman"
