= Alfred Freiherr von Oppenheim =

Alfred von Oppenheim
- Born: Alfred Paul Ernst Freiherr von Oppenheim; May 5, 1934; Cologne, Germany
- Died: January 5, 2005 (aged 70)
- Education: Amherst College, Harvard
- Occupation: Banker
- Spouse: Jeanne
- Children: 2 daughters, 1 son
- Parent: Friedrich Carl von Oppenheim
- Relatives: descendant of Salomon Oppenheim, Jr.
- Awards: Decoration of Honour, Croix de Commandeur

Alfred Paul Ernst Freiherr von Oppenheim (May 5, 1934 – January 5, 2005), known in America as Alfred Oppenheim, was a German billionaire and banker.

Born in Cologne, Germany, Oppenheim was a descendant of Salomon Oppenheim, Jr., who founded the Credit Institute in Bonn and moved to Cologne in 1798. He studied at Amherst and Harvard until 1960. In 1964, he became a senior partner of Sal. Oppenheim, and in 1978 he took over leadership of the board. From 1993, he was a member of the shareholders' committee and the governing body of the bank.

Oppenheim was also vice-president of the German Association of Chambers of Commerce and Industry (Deutscher Industrie- und Handelskammertag) and president of the Franco-German Chamber of Commerce in Paris. He also served as president of the German Council on Foreign Relations Berlin. He founded the Alfred Freiherr von Oppenheim Foundation for Scientific Research.

On 14 October 2004, he was awarded the North Rhine-Westphalia Decoration of Honour. He was a fellow of the University of Cologne, holder of the Federal Cross of Merit First Class of the Federal Republic of Germany. In 2003, he was awarded the Croix de Commandeur from the French Legion of Honour for encouraging and deepening political and cultural ties between Germany and France.

In 1962, he married his wife Jeanne von Oppenheim, with whom he had three children, Victoria, Alexandra, and Christopher. Oppenheim and his wife owned one of the largest private collections of world photography and donated it to an American Museum. Oppenheim died in January 2005 following a short but serious illness.

== See also ==
- Oppenheim family
