= Patrick Faber-Castell =

German socialite and business heir

- Born: Patrick Alexander Hubertus von Faber-Castell; 4 June 1965 (age 61); Düsseldorf, West Germany (now Germany)
- Occupations: Businessman and socialite
- Spouse: Mariella Ahrens (m. 2006; div. 2015)
- Children: 1
- Father: Hubertus Faber-Castell
- Family: Faber-Castell family

Count Patrick Alexander Hubertus von Faber-Castell (born 4 June 1965) is a German businessman, heir and socialite of the Faber-Castell family.

== Early life and education ==
Faber-Castell was born 4 June 1965 in Düsseldorf, West Germany, to Hubertus Faber-Castell, a media entrepreneur and owner of Faber-Castell and Sal. Oppenheim, and Liselotte von Faber-Castell (née Baecker; born 1939). His mother was married a second time to famous rhenish industrialist Hünnebeck. He has an older sister and younger sister. Later is married to the Head of the House of Hesse.

On his paternal side he hails from the nobilitated Faber-Castell family. His father was an heir to both Faber-Castell and the private bank Sal. Oppenheim, which made him a billionaire. He later became successful on his own founding several television stations in China and selling them to the state.

== Career ==
Faber-Castell began a career with Grey Global Group after studying economics. He was from 1993 to 1998 the youngest managing director in Germany and later, as corporate CEO, in London. From London he founded further subsidiaries for Grey Global Group, which dealt with the production of films and videos. In the hot phase of the New Economy, Faber-Castell founded the film and media company Zenturio Group. In 2002, Zenturio Group was sold to a joint venture of Zeiss and Schneider AG. After the sale of Zenturio he was a partner in the agency von Mannstein, which amongst others, supervised the political communication and campaigning for the election campaign of the FDP in 2006. In 2007, he left the advertising industry. He works for the Faber-Castell international family offices alongside his elder sister. The duo has been one of the first investors in the company founded by Thomas Haffa, EM.TV AG.

In 2014, he returned to the advertising industry and advised the moving image agency Atkon. As an investor and managing director at Mediakraft Networks, he spent a year developing the system of the branded channel. At Henkel Group, Faber-Castell has the honorary post as Company Mentor. Further, he is a board member of industry advisors for the company Yext. Faber-Castell also hit the headlines as real estate investor and acquirer of the German porcelain producer, Rosenthal. In 2016, Faber-Castell founded TACSY GmbH, which is Europe's first mover of Flagship Channels.

== FIFA Scandal ==
In 2015, Patrick was involved in a scandal related with the 2006 FIFA World Cup organization. This situation earned him much negative media attention, as his business partner Robert Louis-Dreyfus allegedly abused the company for bribes to FIFA officials. In 2011, Infront was sold to private equity firm Bridgepoint by the consortium of shareholders for approximately 600 million euros.

== Collection ==
Alongside his mother and siblings, Faber-Castell owns one of the most important collections of silver and jewelry in Germany. Most of the pieces are available to the public in various German museums. The private collection has been recorded by the Kunstmuseum Köln and has been published under the name "Ein Rheinischer Silber Schatz – Schmuck und Geraet aus Privatbesitz".

== Personal life ==
On 12 December 2006, Faber-Castell married Russian-born Mariella Ahrens, a German actress, in New York City in a civil ceremony. The couple was introduced at the wedding of Franjo Pooth and Verona Pooth in Vienna, Austria, in September 2005. They had been engaged since September 2006. On 7 July 2007 they were formally wed in a church ceremony, at Stein Castle in Bavaria. They had one daughter;

- Lucia Marie Christina von Faber-Castell (born 24 March 2007)

Faber-Castell adopted Ahrens' daughter, Isabella Maria Ahrens (born 2000), from her first marriage. On 5 November 2012, the couple announced their split "due to different views of life". They were officially divorced in 2015. In 2025, it became public that he is in a relationship with Sandra-Sophie Trauboth (née Woltmann; born 1985), daughter of Jörg Woltmann, sole owner of KPM Berlin.
