= Kaspar Faber =

German businessman

- Born: 31 March 1730; Langenzenn, Holy Roman Empire
- Died: 1784 (aged 53–54); Stein, Bavaria, Holy Roman Empire
- Occupations: Carpenter, entrepreneur
- Known for: Founder of stationery company Faber-Castell
- Children: Anton Wilhelm Faber
- Relatives: Johann Lothar Freiherr von Faber (great-grandson)

Kaspar Faber (1730 – 1784) was a German entrepreneur. He was the founder of the well-known stationery company now known as Faber-Castell.

== Life and work ==
After finishing school, Faber trained as a carpenter. In 1758 he moved from the town of Langenzenn to the municipality of Stein near Nuremberg. His son Anton Wilhelm was born that same year.

Two years later he settled permanently in Stein as a carpenter and in 1761 opened a small workshop where he produced pencils, a typical activity of the carpenter trade at that time. Efforts to turn pencilmaking into a guild-approved craft failed due to lack of approval from the Nuremberg Rugsamt, which supervised trades in the city and its environs.

Pencils made of pure graphite easily crumbled and broke. Thus in 1771 Faber undertook the first attempts to improve pencils by combining ground graphite with sulfur, antimony, and binding resins. The technique of gluing pencils into wooden sticks was already well known in Nuremberg at that time, but Faber did not use it.

During Faber's lifetime, his pencil production business was still on a small scale. With his small workshop he laid the foundation for a pencil factory which his great-grandson Johann Lothar Freiherr von Faber expanded into the world-famous Faber-Castell brand in the middle of the 19th century. The company is still owned by Faber's descendants, currently in the eighth generation.

The Kaspar-Faber-Straße ("Kaspar Faber Street") in Bremen-Oberneuland was named after him in 2000.
