= Oetker =

Oetker is a surname. Notable people with the surname include:

- August Oetker (1862–1918), German inventor, food scientist, and businessman
  - Dr. Oetker, company founded by August Oetker
- Richard Oetker (born 1951), German billionaire heir and businessman, son of Rudolf
- Rudolf August Oetker (1916–2007), German entrepreneur and Nazi, grandson of August
