= Donatus, Landgrave of Hesse =

Head of German dynasty (born 1966)

Donatus
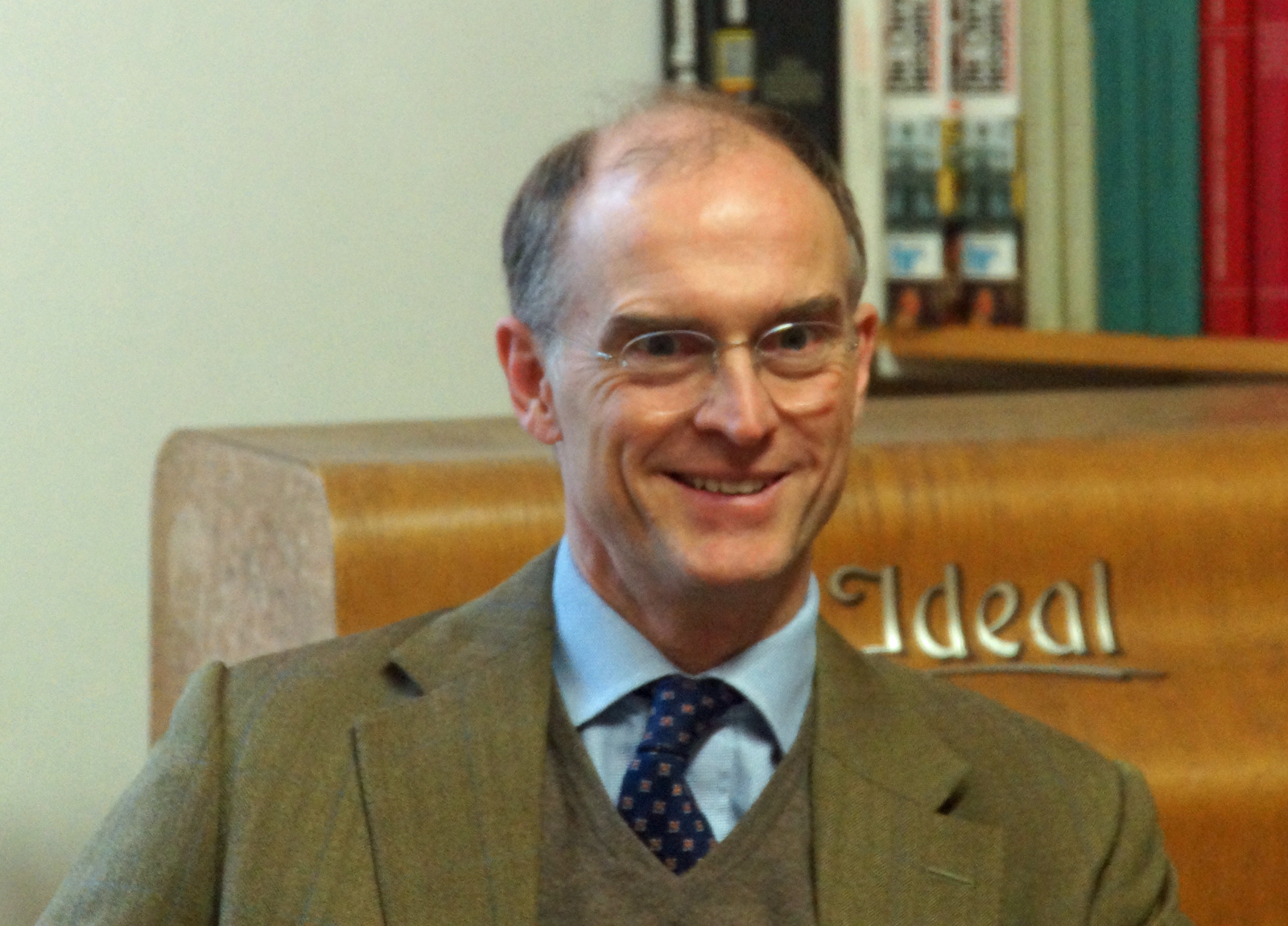
- Donatus in 2022

Head of the House of Hesse
- Tenure: 23 May 2013 – present
- Predecessor: Moritz, Landgrave of Hesse
- Heir apparent: Moritz
- Born: 17 October 1966 (age 60); Kiel, Schleswig-Holstein, West Germany
- Spouse: Countess Floria Franziska Marie-Luisa Erika von Faber-Castell (m. 2003)
- Issue: 3
Names
- Heinrich Donatus Philipp Umberto
- House: Hesse
- Father: Moritz, Landgrave of Hesse
- Mother: Princess Tatiana of Sayn-Wittgenstein-Berleburg

Donatus, Prince and Landgrave of Hesse (legally Heinrich Donatus Philipp Umberto Prinz und Landgraf von Hessen; born 17 October 1966) is a German businessman and the head of the House of Brabant and the House of Hesse.

== Background ==
He is the eldest son and successor of German aristocrat Moritz, Landgrave of Hesse, and his former wife, Princess Tatiana of Sayn-Wittgenstein-Berleburg (b. 1940).

Donatus's father became the head of the Hesse-Cassel line on the death of his own father, Landgrave Philipp in 1980. Having also been the adopted son and heir of his distant cousin, Louis, Prince of Hesse and by Rhine, the latter's death in 1968 as the last male of the Hesse-Darmstadt branch left Moritz head of the entire House of Hesse, to which Donatus succeeded.

== Profession ==
Donatus directs the Hessische Hausstiftung (Foundation of the House of Hesse), a foundation (see below) established to curate and showcase the cultural heritage and history of the House of Hesse, a dynasty which ruled the Electorate of Hesse-Cassel until 1866, the Grand Duchy of Hesse and by Rhine until 1918, and whose male-line antecedents and co-lateral ties include the Protestant leader Philip the Magnanimous, the Swedish king Frederick I, Russia's last tsarina Alexandra Feodorovna, the exiled Spanish queen Victoria Eugenie of Battenberg, and Britain's last viceroy of India, the assassinated Louis, Earl Mountbatten of Burma.

Donatus also manages Prinz von Hessen, a winery specializing in production of varietal vintages on his 45 hectare vineyard.

== Marriage and issue ==
Donatus married the daughter of German industrial heir and Chinese honorary citizen Count Hubertus von Faber-Castell, Countess Floria Franziska Marie-Luisa Erika von Faber-Castell (born 14 October 1974, Düsseldorf), in a civil ceremony in Wiesbaden on 25 April 2003. The bride is a communications professional and a niece of Count Anton Wolfgang von Faber-Castell, former chairman of the board of the famous Faber-Castell pen-and-pencil company headquartered near Nuremberg and scion of the eponymous family, which is a morganatic branch of the Castell-Rüdenhausen princely family. Prince Donatus and Floria Franziska are 6th cousins, as both descended from Frederick II, Landgrave of Hesse-Kassel and his first wife Princess Mary of Great Britain.

The couple's religious wedding ceremony took place on 17 May 2003, attended by royalty and aristocrats. Held at the Johanneskirche and followed by a grand ball in the Green Salon, state room of the former Friedrichshof palace in Kronberg (now a luxury hotel and golf course owned by the House of Hesse's family foundation) where Donatus's ancestress, the German Empress Frederick, Princess Royal, lived in widowhood, more than 300 guests were present. Among them were Caroline, Princess of Hanover, Princess Benedikte of Denmark, and Gloria, Princess of Thurn and Taxis.

== Representative appearances ==
In 2021, Donatus was one of only 30 mourners at Prince Philip, the Duke of Edinburgh's, funeral at St George's Chapel, Windsor Castle. He also attended the state funeral of Queen Elizabeth II at Westminster Abbey, London, on 19 September 2022. King Charles III appointed Donatus his personal representative to the funeral of his first cousin Maximilian, Margrave of Baden, on 13 January 2023.

Although, as a descendant of Queen Victoria, he is only a distant relative of today's British royals who are more closely related to some other princes of Hesse, descendants of Prince Philip's sister Sophie, there is a close connection to the British royal family through Donatus' adoptive grandparents, Louis, Prince of Hesse and by Rhine, and his wife Margaret Campbell Geddes, who were relatives and close friends of Queen Elizabeth II and Prince Philip, as Philip's sister Cecilie had been married to Louis' elder brother Georg Donatus, Hereditary Grand Duke of Hesse. The late Queen, Prince Philip and Charles (then Prince of Wales) have visited Wolfsgarten on several occasions.

== Foundation of the House of Hesse ==
Founded in 1928, the Foundation of the House of Hesse is the successor institution of a family trust that had been established in 1830, confiscated by the Kingdom of Prussia in 1866, and re-established after partial restitution in 1878. The foundation manages the family fortunes including forests, agricultural estates, castles, hotels and an art collection. The latter is mainly shown at Fasanerie Palace in Eichenzell, Hesse, a former summer palace of the Prince Abbots of Fulda that had been taken over by the Landgraves of Hesse after the secularization and mediatisation of the Prince-bishopric of Fulda in 1803. Schlosshotel Kronberg and (until 2020) Grandhotel Hessischer Hof in Frankfurt are hotels operated by the foundation, the Weingut Prinz von Hessen a winery in Johannisberg which was purchased in 1957, while Schloß Wolfsgarten south of Frankfurt am Main and Panker estate in Schleswig-Holstein are used as private seats of the family. Other castles have been sold, such as Schloss Philippsruhe in Hanau (in 1950), Schloss Rumpenheim in Offenbach am Main (in 1965) and Tarasp Castle in Switzerland (in 2016). The Landgrave and his family live in Wolfsgarten and Panker.

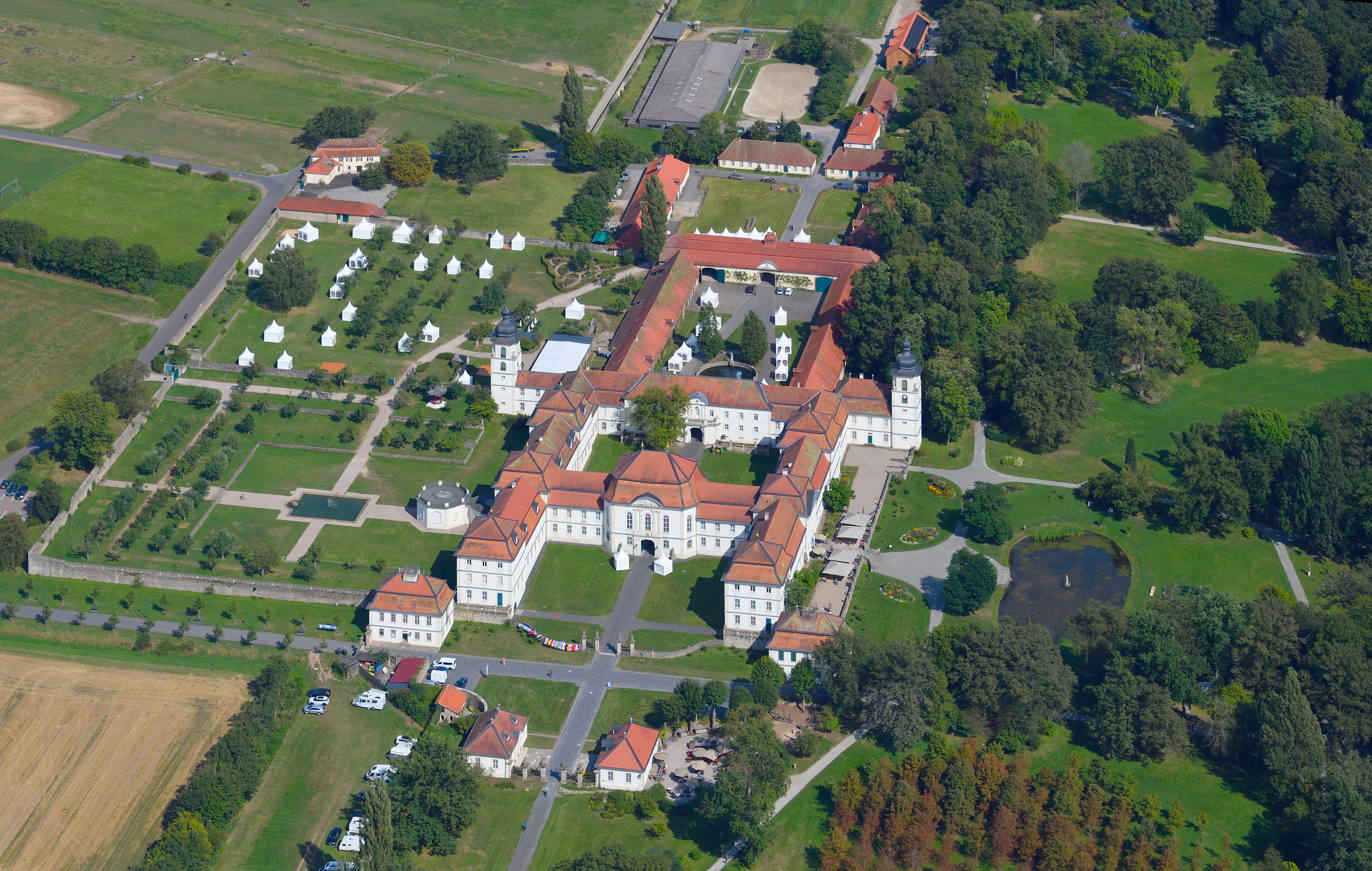
Fasanerie Palace near Fulda, Hesse

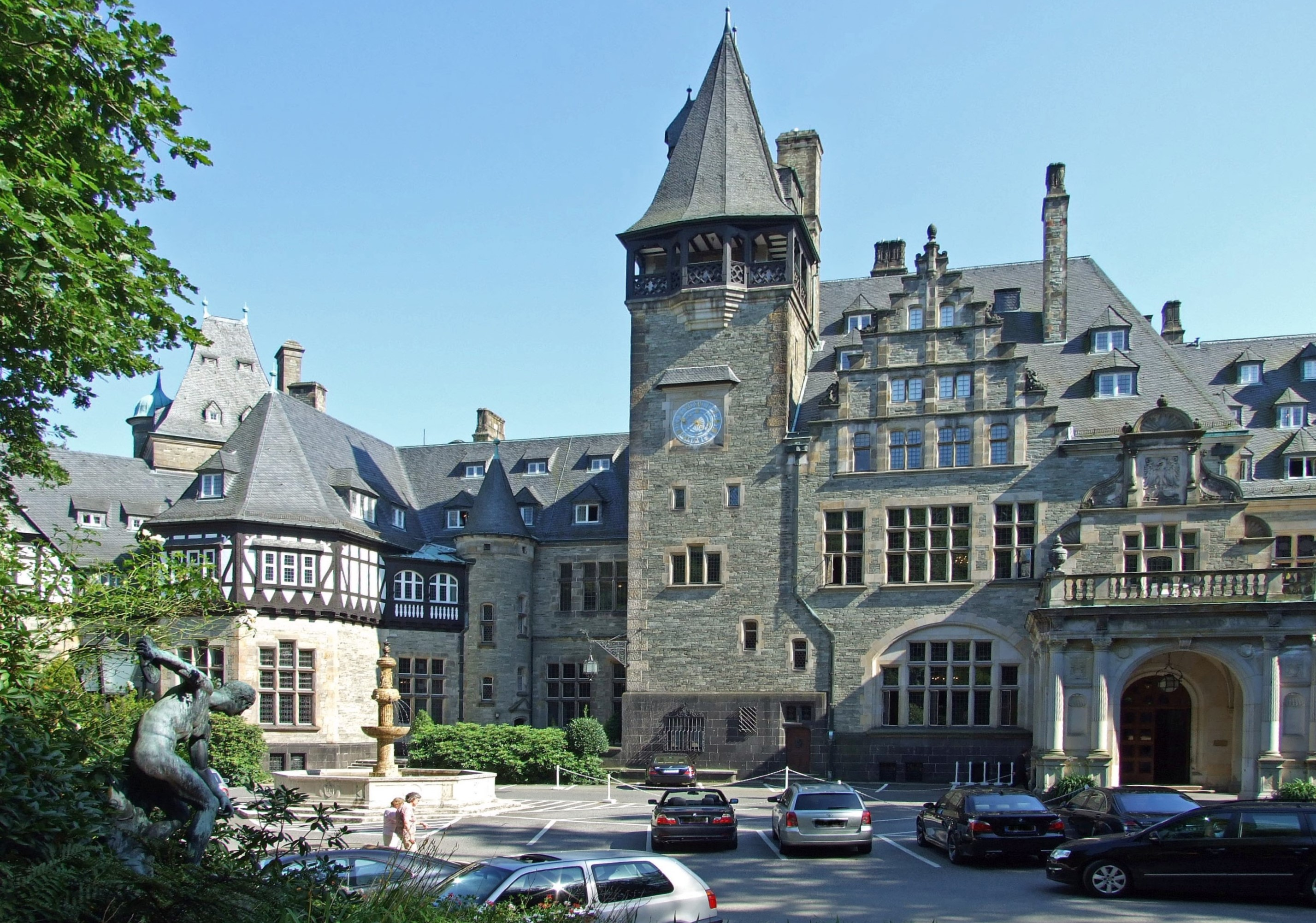
Schlosshotel Kronberg near Frankfurt, Hesse

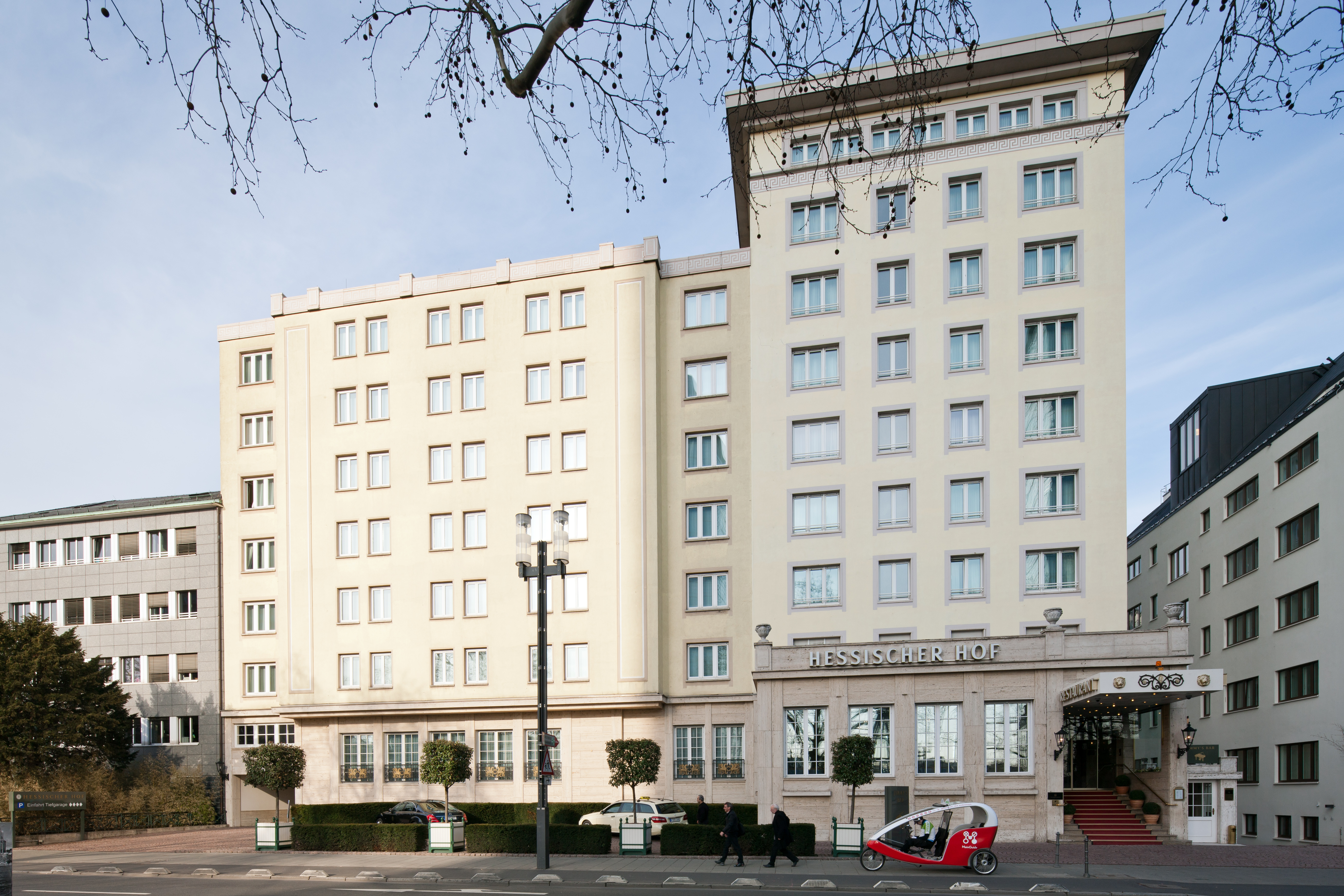
Grandhotel Hessischer Hof in Frankfurt

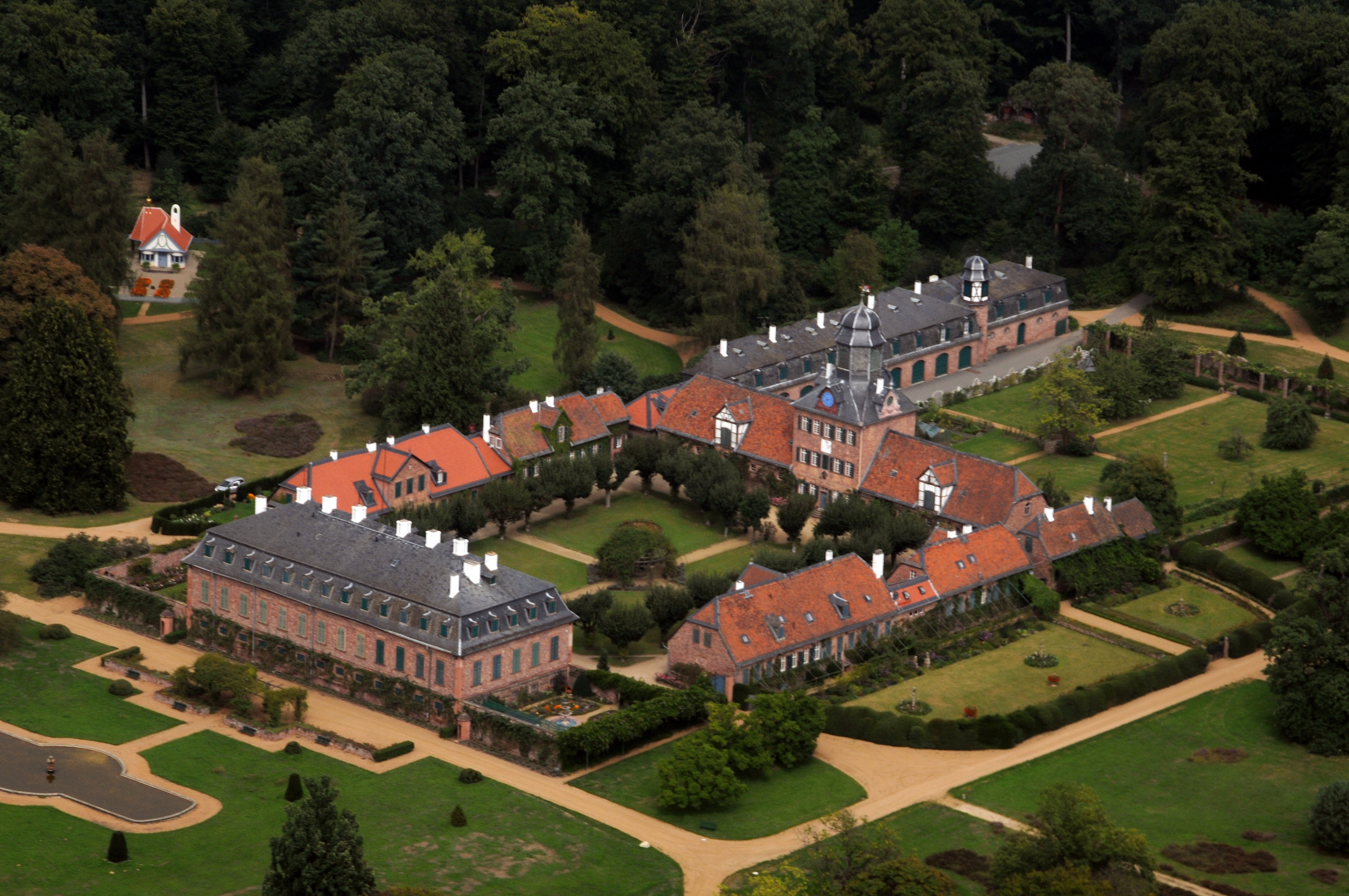
Schloß Wolfsgarten near Frankfurt

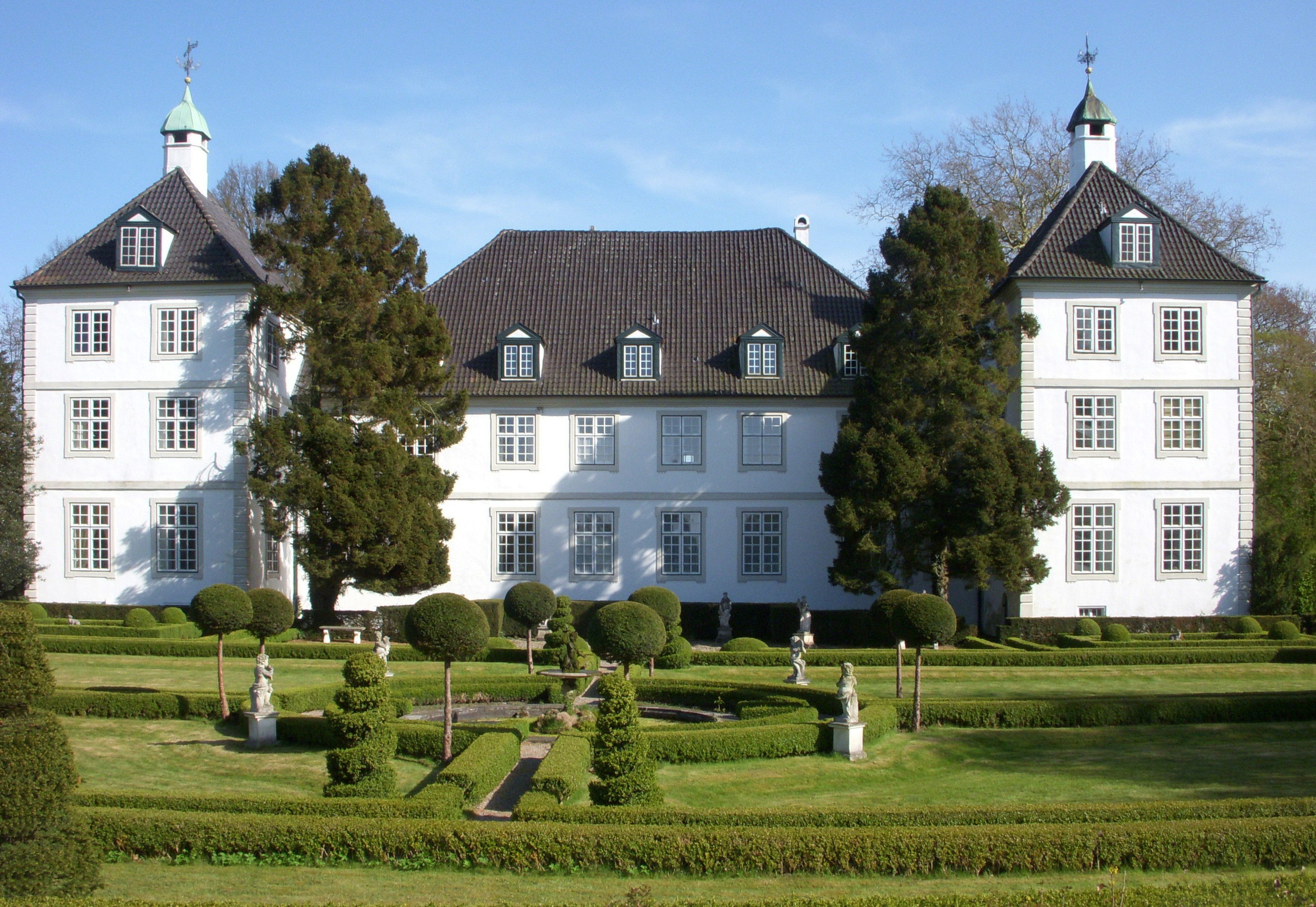
Panker Estate

== References and notes ==
Donatus, Landgrave of Hesse House of Hesse Born: 17 October 1966
Regnal titles
Preceded by Moritz, Landgrave of Hesse	Head of the House of Hesse; 23 May 2013 –	Incumbent; Heir: Moritz, Hereditary Prince of Hesse
Preceded by Moritz, Landgrave of Hesse	— TITULAR — Grand Duke of Hesse and by Rhine; 23 May 2013 – Reason for succession failure: Grand Duchy abolished in 1918	Incumbent; Heir: Moritz, Hereditary Prince of Hesse
Preceded by Moritz, Landgrave of Hesse	— TITULAR — Elector of Hesse; 23 May 2013 – Reason for succession failure: Electorate annexed by Prussia in 1866	Incumbent; Heir: Moritz, Hereditary Prince of Hesse
