= Lothar von Faber =

German Industrialist (1817–1896)

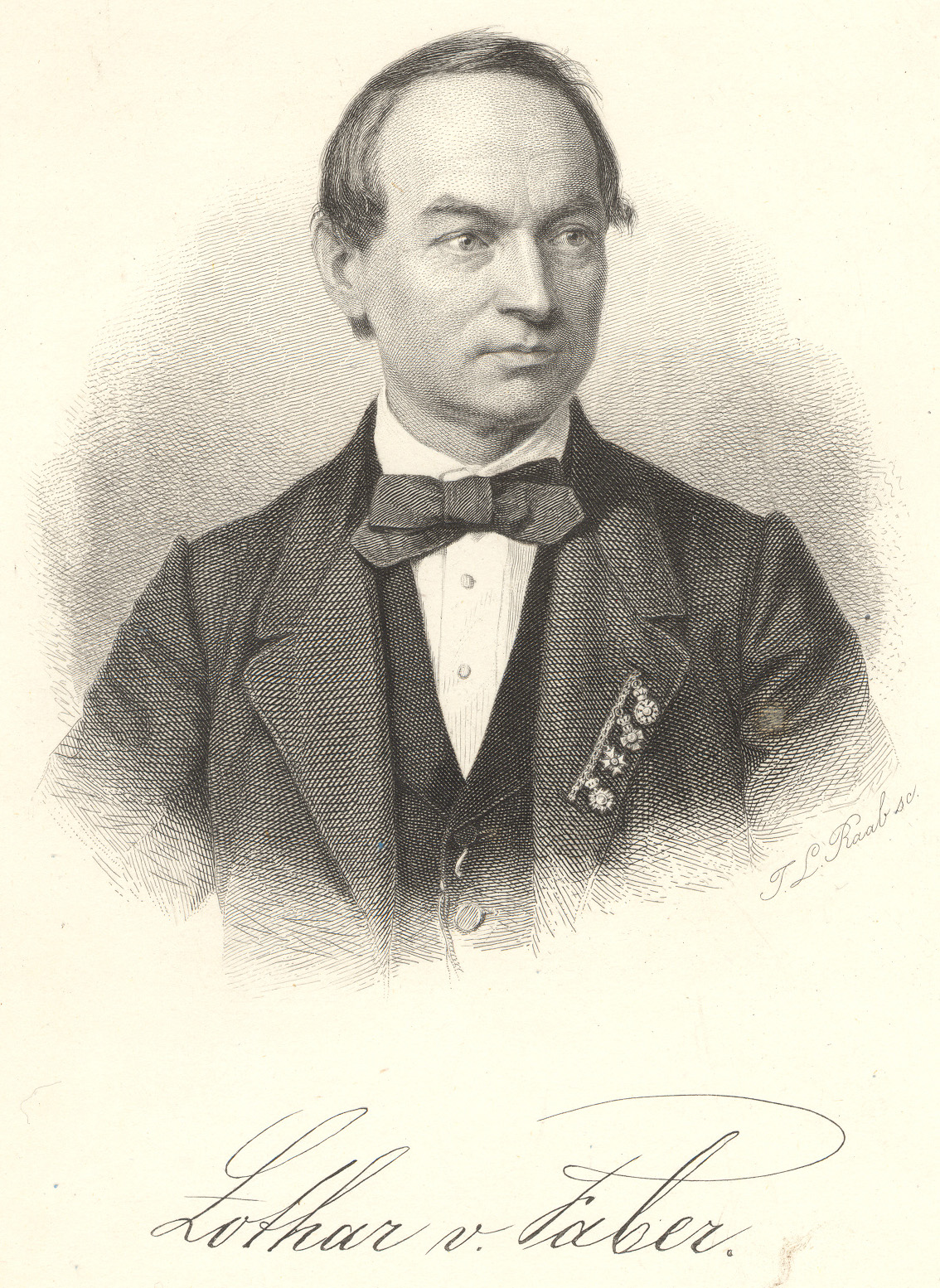
- 1873 portrait of Johann Lothar Freiherr von Faber by Johann Leonhard Raab
- Born: Johann Lothar Freiherr von Faber; June 12, 1817; Unterspitzgarten
- Died: July 26, 1896 (aged 79); Stein
- Occupation: Entrepreneur
- Known for: Leader of Faber-Castell
- Notable work: International expansion of the company; Trademark protection in Germany

Johann Lothar Freiherr von Faber (born 12 June 1817 in Unterspitzgarten (Note: In the 19th century, Spitzgarten was the name of the part of Stein (now relatively small in area due to the later incorporations in the western part of Stein) that lies east of the Rednitz. The main complex of the Faber-Castell company is located there today. The Faberschloss and the factory owner's villa are now within the borders of Oberspitzgarten.) near Stein, Bavaria – 26 July 1896 in Stein) was a German industrialist.

He inherited the pencil company Faber-Castell (then called A.W. Faber) in 1839 after the death of his father, Georg Leonhard von Faber. Under his leadership, the company gained access to new sources of raw materials and expanded internationally.

Von Faber also played an important role in the introduction of trademark protection in Germany; his 1874 petition to the German Reichstag for such legislation contributed to the Act on Trade Mark Protection, passed the following year.

Lothar von Faber married Ottilie Richter in 1847. The couple had one child, Wilhelm, born in 1851.

== Bibliography ==
- Bernhard Hoffmann (1959). "Faber, Lothar von (bayerischer Personaladel 1863), Freiherr von (seit 1881)". Neue Deutsche Biographie (in German). Vol. 4. Berlin: Duncker & Humblot. pp. 722–723. (full text online).
- Juliane Nitzke-Dürr (1999), Lothar Freiherr von Faber. Made in Germany. (in German), Ullstein, ISBN 3-548-35872-1
- Asta Scheib (2002), Eine Zierde in ihrem Hause. Die Geschichte der Ottilie von Faber-Castell (Romanbiographie) (in German), Rowohlt, ISBN 3-499-26399-8
- Hans-Christian Teubrich; Gabriele Leuthäuser; Jutta Tschoeke; Jürgen Franzke (1986), Das Bleistiftschloß. Faber-Castell in Stein. Familie und Unternehmen. (in German), München: Hugendubel, ISBN 9783880343078, OCLC 25016344
