= Sal. Oppenheim =

German bank

Sal. Oppenheim jr. & Cie. AG & Co. KGaA

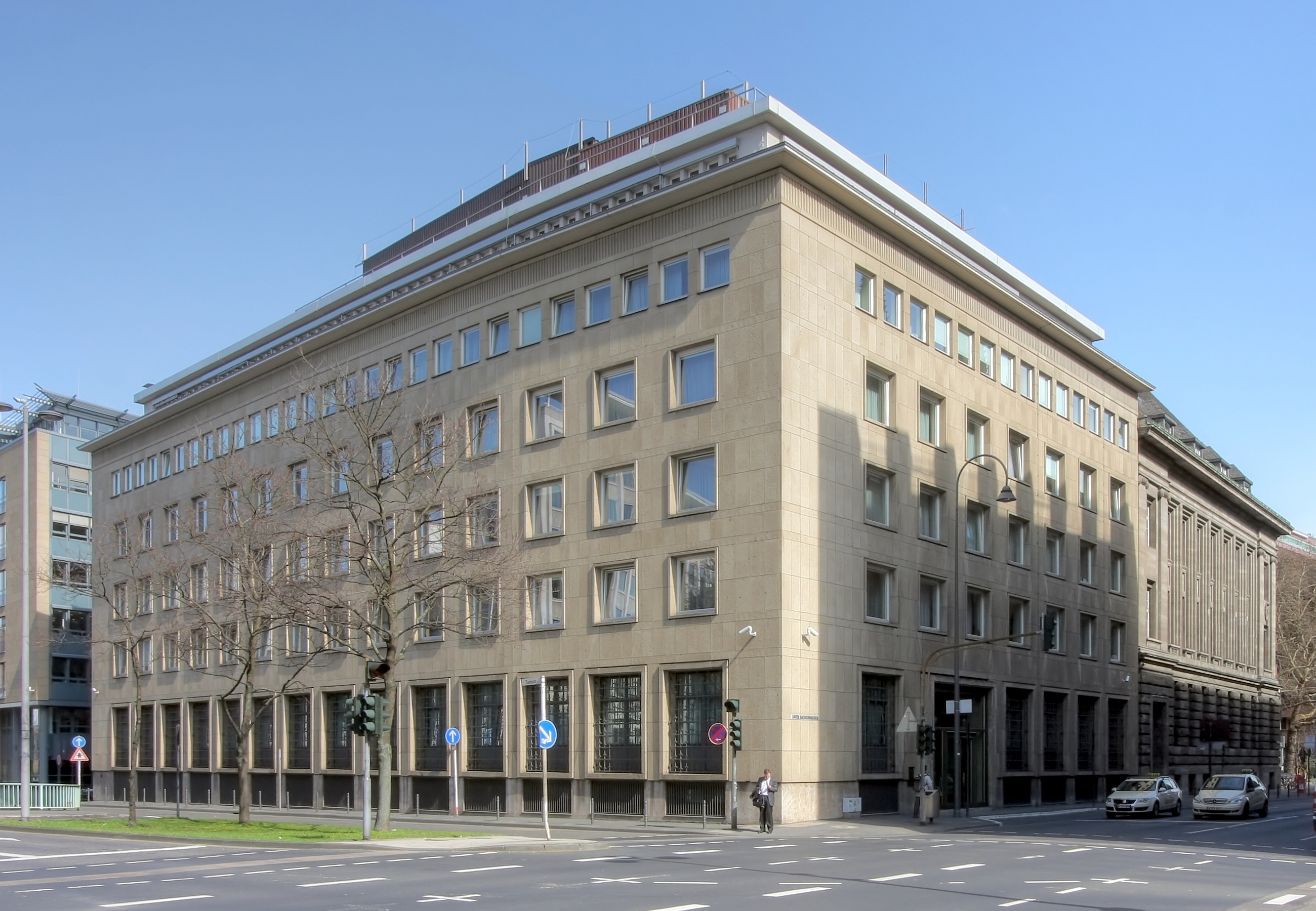
- Headquarters in Cologne
- Type: Subsidiary (since 2010)
- Industry: Private banking Investment management
- Founded: Bonn (1789)
- Founder: Salomon Oppenheim Jr.
- Defunct: 30 June 2018
- Fate: Fully absorbed into Deutsche Bank
- Headquarters: Cologne, Germany
- Parent: Deutsche Bank
- Website: www.oppenheim.de

Sal. Oppenheim was a German private bank founded in 1789 and headquartered in Cologne, Germany. It provided asset management solutions for wealthy individual clients and institutional investors. In 2009, the bank became a subsidiary of Deutsche Bank. In 2017, Deutsche Bank decided to discontinue the Sal. Oppenheim brand and to fully integrate their business, which was officially completed on 30 June 2018.

== History ==
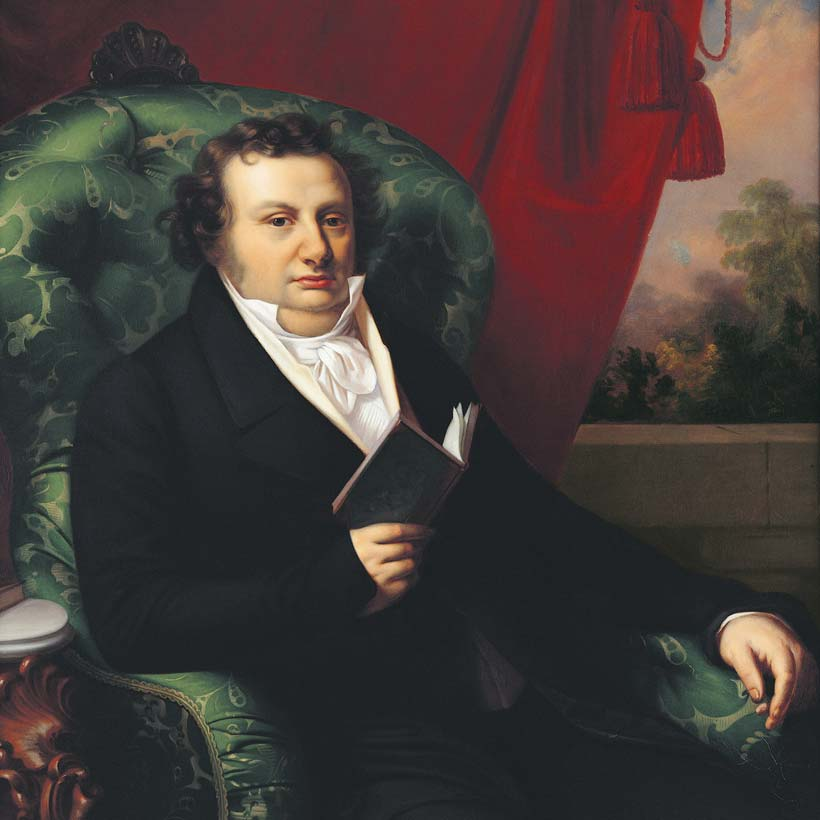
Salomon Oppenheim Jr., founder

=== Founding ===
The bank was founded in 1789 in the city of Bonn by seventeen-year-old Salomon Oppenheim Jr. as a commissions and exchange house. Oppenheim dealt in commodities, the exchanging of foreign currencies, extending credit, and commercial credit.

In 1798, the business moved to Cologne, then the most important banking location in Germany, settling in a palatial building on Grosse Budengasse 8. In 1828, Salomon Oppenheim Jr. died, and his wife Therese took over the direction of the bank along with their two sons, Simon and Abraham. Through the marriage in 1834 of Abraham Oppenheim to Charlotte Beyfus, daughter of Siegmund Leopold Beyfus (1786–1845) and Babette Rothschild (1784–1869), the family became closely related to the prominent Rothschild banking family in matters both personal and business-related.

=== Financing of industrialisation of the Ruhr ===
Beginning in the 1820s, Oppenheim financed the navy of the Rhineland and later helped in the growth of the beginnings of the railway system, along with the industrialisation of the Rhineland and the Ruhr.

In 1836, a subsidiary company was founded in Amsterdam that survived until 1856. 1837 saw, for the first-time, the financing of many evolving, large-scale corporations. In 1838, the bank, together with the A. Schaaffhausen'scher Bank Association and the Herstatt Bank, founded the Colonia-Insurance Company. After the death of Therese Oppenheim in 1842, the company continued under the leadership of her two remaining sons. In 1853, the bank founded the Darmstädter Bank and, in 1870, was involved in the mortgage bank Eurohypo AG.

While Salomon, Therese, Simon and Abraham Oppenheim were believers of Judaism, Albert Oppenheim, one of Salomon's sons, converted to Catholicism in 1858, and in 1859, Eduard Oppenheim, Simon's eldest son, was baptised Protestant.

In 1868, Abraham Oppenheim was raised to the rank of a Prussian Freiherr and belonged to the inner-circle of King Wilhelm I.

=== Becoming a limited partnership ===
After the death of Abraham and Simon in 1880, their sons, Albert and Eduard, assumed leadership of the bank. In 1904, the form of the company changed from that of a general partnership to one of a limited partnership that, from then on, was led by Alfred von Oppenheim and his cousin, Emil.

In 1912, with the appointment of Ferdinand Rinkel, the bank was led for the first time by someone outside the family. In 1921, he was replaced by Otto Kaufmann. From 1914 on, the bank was involved with nine war loans to Germany to help finance the first World War.

In 1936, the bank "voluntarily" Aryanised with the addition of Robert Pferdmenges as partner. Likewise, in 1936, the bank absorbed the Jewish Bank of A. Levy. In 1938, the bank signed their name to the newspaper campaign of the Nazi Party as Robert Pferdmenges & Co.. The first private German horse stud farm, Schlenderhan, which was founded by Eduard von Oppenheim in 1869, was transferred to the SS in 1942. After the imprisonment of Waldemar and Friedrich Carl von Oppenheim in 1944, the bank came to a standstill.

=== Return of the Oppenheims ===
In 1945, the bank started up business again under the name of Pferdmenges & Co., and, in 1947, the name was changed back to Sal. Oppenheim Jr. & Cie., with the Oppenheims once again becoming shareholders. The bank, amongst others, helped finance the Auto Union, which later became Audi AG.

In August 1954, all limited partners' shares were held by ten partners centered around Countess Emmy Arco-Valley (née Baroness von Oppenheim) and mother of Anton Count of Arco-Valley, Victoria von Frankenberg-Ludwigsdorf (née Baroness von Oppenheim), Dr. Stanislaus Count Strachwitz, Karin Baronin von Ullmann (née Baroness von Oppenheim), Ingrid Baroness von Oppenheim, Friedrich Carl Freiherr von Oppenheim, Count Wolf von Bredow, Clemens Carl Baron von Wrede, as well as the descendants of Robert Pferdmenges, Heinz Pferdmenges, and Ilse Bscher.

Victoria von Frankenberg-Ludwigsdorf died in the same year. Her daughter Alix-May Countess von Faber-Castell inherited her estate. Georg Baron von Ullmann, who had married Karin von Ullmann in 1953, became a new partner after 1954 and remained so until he died in 1972.

In 1968, the bank absorbed the Heinrich Kirchholtes & Co. Bank in Frankfurt. Later expansions took place through subsidiary companies in Zurich, Munich, Paris, and London.

In the course of German reunification, the bank gained the position of advisor to the State on matters of privatisation.

In 1989, the bank's interests in the Colonia-Insurance Company were bought out and the bank's status there became that of limited partnership on share matters.

In 2004, the bank bought out the BHF Bank from the Dutch ING Group. With the transfer of BHF, Sal. Oppenheim has risen to the largest privately owned German bank (with M. M. Warburg & Co. out of Hamburg being the second) and to being the largest European family-owned bank.

At the end of 2003, the bank employed 1,500 people in twenty locations, had nearly US$127 billion in asset management and profits totaling €61 million a year.

With the death of Alfred Freiherr von Oppenheim in 2005, the Oppenheim family's participation in the bank effectively ended. Alfred had partnered it with real estate developer Josef Esch, who subsequently played a major and sometimes controversial role in the bank's business activities.

=== Transition and sale ===
In 2007, the bank headquarters moved to Luxembourg.

On 4 July 2008, a subsidiary, Oppenheim Investment Managers Limited, was sold to Merrion Capital Group Limited.

In December 2010, the bank was acquired by Deutsche Bank for the reported sum of €1 billion, after it had become exposed to the Arcandor bankruptcy. After the completion of the takeover, the headquarters was again moved back to Cologne, Germany.

== People associated with the bank ==
Bankers from Sal. Oppenheim often play a prominent role in German political and economic history, among others:

- Salomon Oppenheim, Jr (founder)
- Abraham Oppenheim (partner 1821–1878)
- Simon Oppenheim (partner 1828–1880)
- Albert von Oppenheim (partner 1880–1904)
- Robert Pferdmenges (partner 1929–1953)
- Alfred Freiherr von Oppenheim (partner 1964–1993)
- Matthias Graf von Krockow (partner 1986–2010)
- Karin von Ullmann (owner)
- Nicolaus von Oppenheim (owner)
- Henri Pferdmenges (owner)
- Hubertus Graf von Faber-Castell (owner)
- Christopher von Oppenheim (partner 1990–2010)
- Karl Otto Pöhl (partner 1993–1998)
- Wolfgang Leoni (chairman of the executive board of the bank 2013–)
- Siegfried Grohs (managing director 2008–2011)

== See also ==
- List of oldest banks
- List of banks in Germany
