= Mariella Ahrens =

German actress

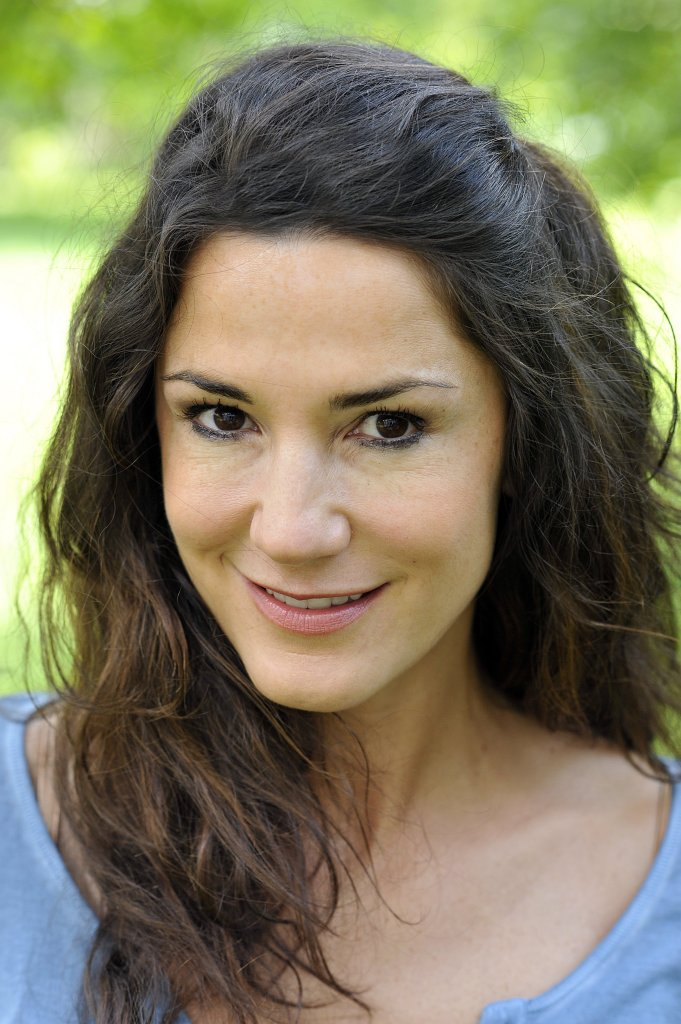
- Mariella Ahrens in 2013
- Born: 2 April 1969 (age 57); Leningrad, Soviet Union
- Occupation: Actress
- Spouse(s): Jost Paffrath (2001, sep. 2002, div. 2004); Patrick Alexander Hubertus Graf von Faber-Castell (civ. 2006, rel. 2007, sep. 2012, div. 2015)
- Partner: Dragan Banić (bef. 1999, sep. aft. 1999)
- Children: Isabella Maria Ahrens; Lucia Marie Christina Gräfin von Faber-Castell

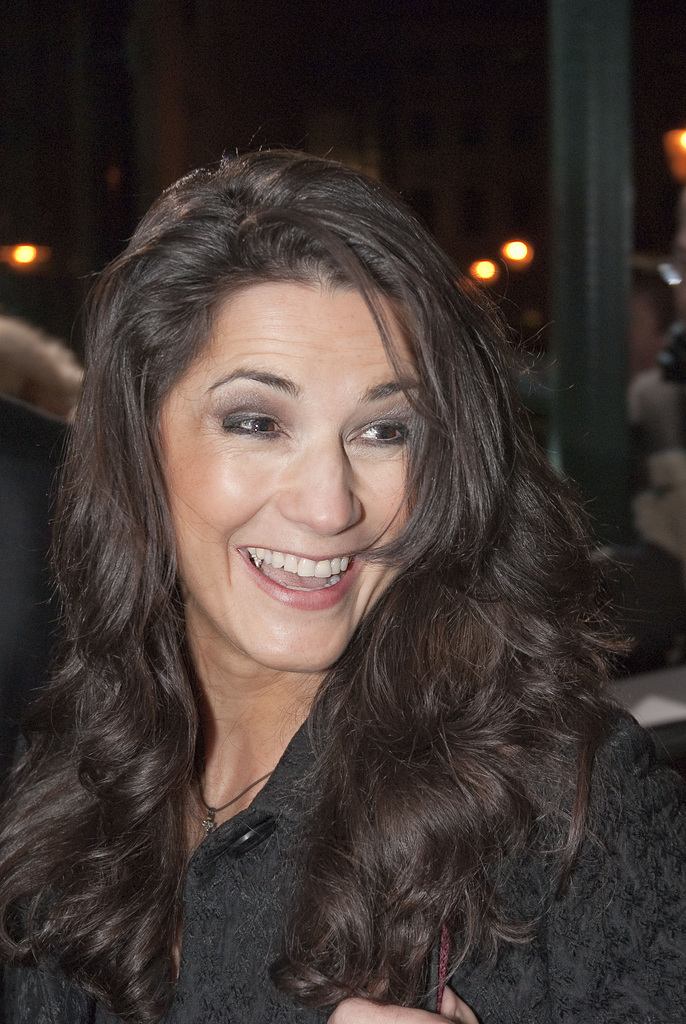
Mariella Ahrens at the Berlin International Film Festival 2008

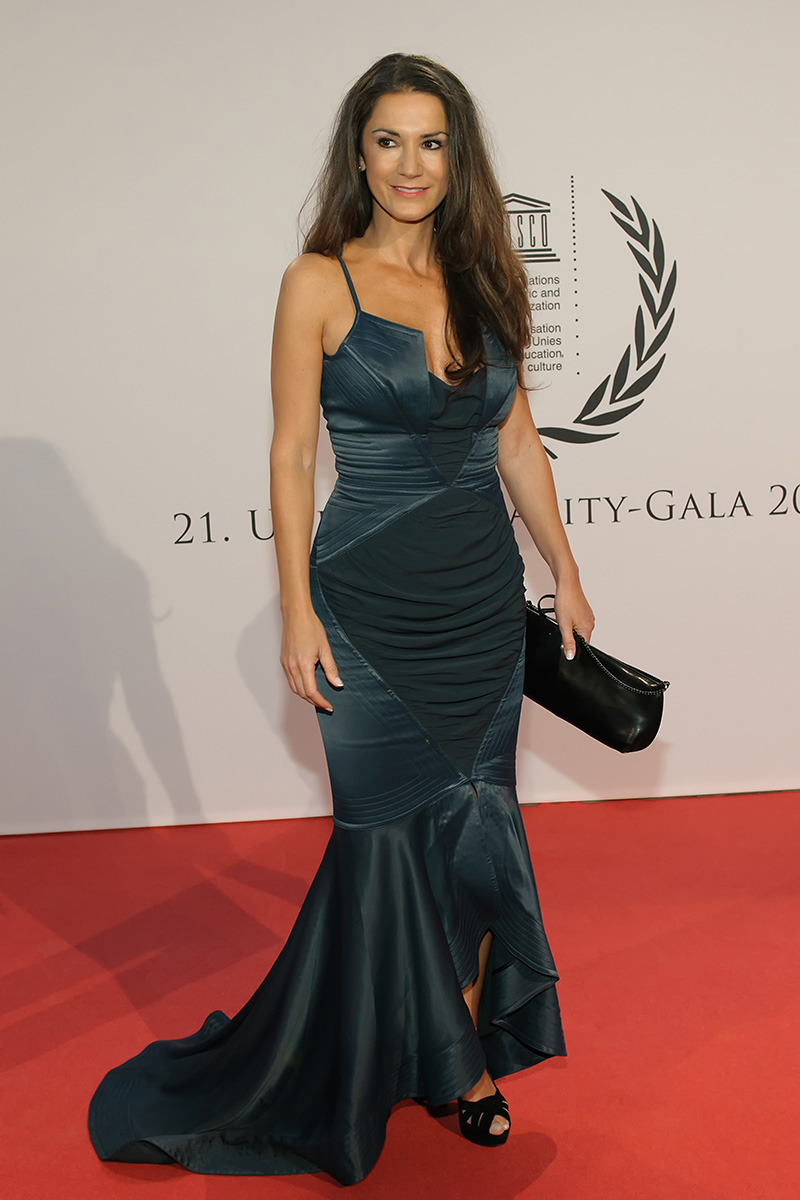
Mariella Ahrens at the UNESCO-Gala, 2012

Mariella Ahrens (born 2 April 1969) is a German actress.

== Early life ==
Ahrens was born in Leningrad (now Saint Petersburg), Soviet Union, as the daughter of Reinhard Ahrens, a German computer specialist, and wife Svetlana "Svetla" Ahrens, a Bulgarian ophthalmologist. She grew up to the age of three in Bulgaria and then moved in 1974 to Berlin-Friedrichshain, East Berlin, in East Germany.

== Education ==
After a previous cancellation by the Ernst Busch Academy of Dramatic Arts, she completed her education as an actress at Fritz-Kirchhoff-Schule in Berlin.

== Career ==
Ahrens first appeared on stage at the Kleine Theatre in "Palais Podewils" in Berlin.

In addition to roles in television series such as Leipzig Homicide, Sabine! and Im Namen des Gesetzes, she also played in the ZDF production The Desert Rose (2000) as well as The Dreaming (2001) and Rosamunde Pilcher films.

In 2004 she was a participant in "Ich bin ein Star—Holt mich hier raus!".

In 2015 she played Walpurga von Schwarztal in the television movie Prinzessin Maleen.

Ahrens was photographed for the March 2001 issue and as a cover girl for the March 2004 issue and for the April 2025 issue of the German Playboy magazine.

== Filmography ==
=== Film ===
- 1987 Jan Oppen - Motorradbraut.
- 2015: Prinzessin Maleen

== Television series ==
- 1995 Balko - Sandra. 'Hotline' episode.

== Personal life ==
In 1999, Ahrens gave birth to her daughter, Isabella Maria Ahrens, in a relationship with Croatian derivative trader Dragan Banić.

In 2001, Ahrens married investment banker Jost Paffrath. One year later they separated and divorced in 2004.

On 12 December 2006, Ahrens married Patrick Alexander Hubertus Graf von Faber-Castell, born in Düsseldorf on 4 June 1965, in a civil ceremony in New York City, New York. Although she has since been called "Countess von Faber-Castell", she continued to call herself Ahrens. The couple met each other at the wedding of Verona and Franjo Pooth in Vienna in September 2005 and were engaged since September 2006. The church wedding took place on 7 July 2007 at the Martin Luther Church in Schloss Stein, in Stein, Nuremberg. Ahrens' daughter was adopted by Patrick Graf von Faber-Castell. Their daughter, Lucia Marie Christina, was born in Berlin on 24 March 2007. On 5 November 2012, the couple announced their split "due to different views of life". They divorced in 2015.
