= Faber-Castell =

German stationery manufacturing company

Faber-Castell AG

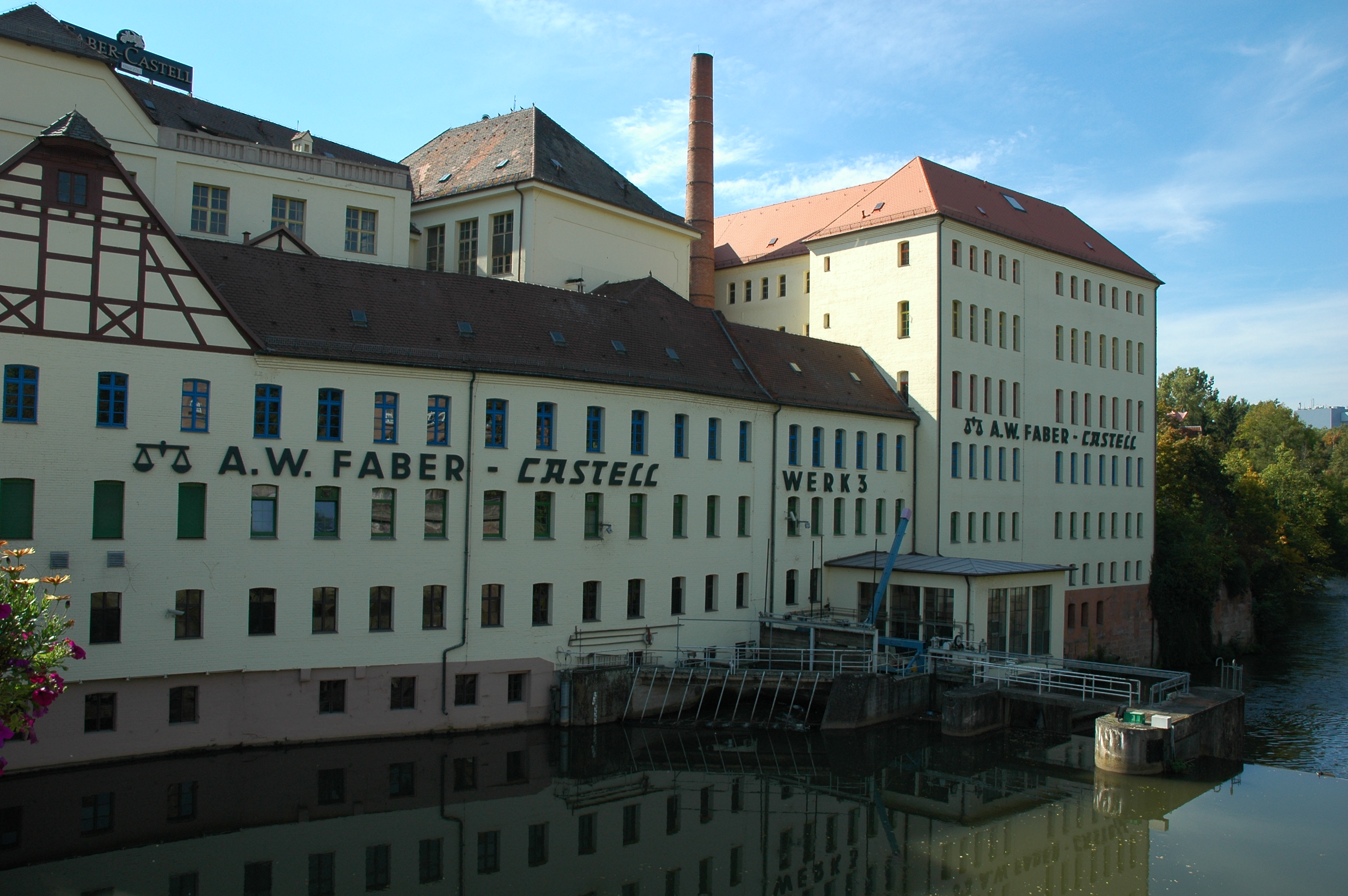
- Faber-Castell-Werk in Stein
- Formerly: A. W. Faber Company
- Company type: Private joint stock company (Aktiengesellschaft)
- Industry: Stationery
- Predecessor: Bleistift-Fabrik vorm. Johannes Faber
- Founded: 1761; 265 years ago
- Founder: Kaspar Faber
- Headquarters: Stein, Bavaria, Germany
- Area served: Worldwide
- Key people: Stefan Leitz (CEO); Constantin Neubeck (CFO); Simon Hauser (CTO); Dirk Engehausen (Chairman of the Supervisory Board)
- Products: Art materials, Writing instruments
- Brands: Graf von Faber-Castell
- Revenue: € 649.2 million (2022–23)
- Number of employees: 6,500 (2024)
- Subsidiaries: Eberhard Faber (1987–present) (Note: The U.S. Eberhard Faber subsidiary was acquired by Sanford L.P. in 1994. It was later added to the Paper Mate brand.)
- Website: faber-castell.com

Faber-Castell AG is a German privately held multinational manufacturer of pens, pencils, other office supplies (e.g., staplers, slide rules, erasers, rulers) and art supplies, as well as high-end writing instruments and luxury leather goods. Headquartered in Stein, Bavaria, Germany, it operates 14 factories and 20 sales units throughout the globe.

The Faber-Castell Group employs a staff of approximately 6,500 and does business in more than 120 countries. The House of Faber-Castell is the family which founded and continues to exercise leadership within the corporation. Faber-Castell manufactures about 2 billion pencils in more than 120 different colors every year.

== History ==
=== Founding, family ownership, and early expansion (1761-1896) ===
Faber-Castell was founded in 1761 in Stein, Germany, by cabinet maker Kaspar Faber (1730–1784) as the A. W. Faber Company. It has remained in the Faber family for eight generations. The company expanded under Kaspar Faber's great-grandson, Lothar von Faber (1817–1896), and his wife Ottilie.

Lothar opened branches in New York (1849), London (1851), Paris (1855), and expanded into Vienna (1872) and St. Petersburg (1874). The company also began offering products other than pencils, opening a factory in Geroldsgrün, Bavaria, where slide rules were produced, a slate factory in Geroldsgrün, and producing ink and paint in Noisy-le-Sec, near Paris.

==== Securing global recognition ====
To combat counterfeit A. W. Faber products, Lothar petitioned the Reichstag to put in place trademark protections in Germany. As a result, the Act on Trade Mark Protection came into effect in 1875, and protections were expanded in the 1894 Act on the Protection of Trade Marks. Lothar's first trademark was registered in 1894, with the registration number DE 43. Outside of Germany, the trademark was also registered in the United States (where it was one of the earliest ever registered), Russia, England, Spain, France, and Italy during Lothar's time as the head of the company.

=== The rise of "Castell" pencils and the jousting knights motif (1898-1908) ===
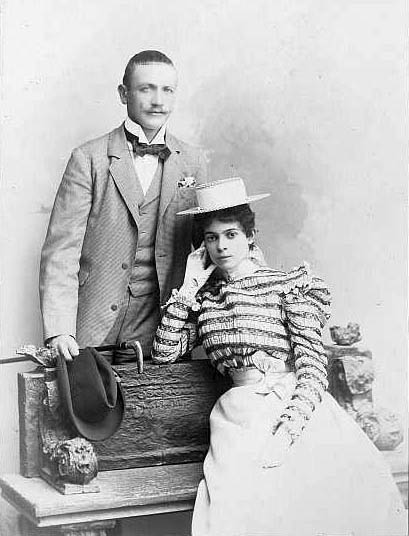
Ottilie von Faber and Alexander zu Castell

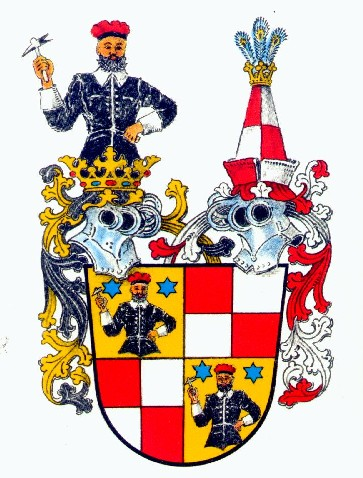
Coat of arms of Counts von Faber-Castell, created after the wedding of Ottilie von Faber and Alexander zu Castell in 1898

In 1898, Lothar's granddaughter and heiress, Ottilie "Tilly" von Faber, married Count Alexander zu Castell-Rüdenhausen, and the couple became progenitors of the Faber-Castell family. Seven years later, the company began producing a new line of pencils, called "Castell".

Over the next few years, this line developed recognizable branding, featuring the green color of the pencils (chosen to match the color of Alexander's military regiment), a logo depicting a castle, and the motif of two jousting knights, which was used on packaging and in advertising.

This motif originated with a painting, commissioned by Alexander, of two knights jousting with pencils, and would eventually become the inspiration behind the company's current logo. 1908 saw the release of the Polychromos coloured pencils, which continue to be made and widely used today.

=== World War I ===
As a German company, several of the Faber-Castell's foreign subsidiaries and branches in Allied countries were confiscated during World War I. Among them, the Faber-Castell properties in New York and Paris were eventually sold off. Nevertheless, the company survived and saw further growth following the war with the construction of new, expanded manufacturing facilities and new company acquisitions. The company's name was also officially changed following Alexander's death in 1928, becoming A. W. Faber "Castell" Bleistiftfabrik (Pencil Company).

=== Great depression and World War II ===
As the Great Depression cast its long shadow over the global economy in the early 1930s, Alexander's son, Roland von Faber-Castell, inherited the leadership of the company. Facing economic hardship, Roland sought strategic partnerships to weather the storm. In 1932, a collaboration with Johann Faber, a rival pencil company founded by Lothar Faber's brother, was established. The two shared resources in an effort to operate more efficiently and bring down their costs. In the following years, Roland gradually bought up shares of Johann Faber until it was fully acquired (along with its Brazilian subsidiary) in 1942. This strategic move brought the popular Goldfaber colored pencil line under the Faber-Castell umbrella. During this period, further expansion came through the acquisition of the renowned fountain pen maker, Osmia.

In 1939, the Third Reich seized the Stein Castle near Nuremberg, previously owned by Count Roland von Faber-Castell, a seventh-generation head of the Faber-Castell pencil manufacturing company. The Nazis removed Count Faber-Castell from his leadership position and reportedly used the castle's bell tower for Allied bombing raid interception. Count Roland von Faber-Castell was drafted into the German military, which resulted in a shift in leadership for the Faber-Castell company. At this time, the first non-family CEO was appointed by the Nazi party. Amidst managerial changes, Count Roland's wife, Nina, converted the company into a sole proprietorship, effectively regaining control. By 1942, the company had been renamed A. W. Faber-Castell.

In the years following World War II, the company expanded internationally into Ireland, Austria, Brazil, Peru, Australia, and Argentina, as well as re-acquiring several subsidiaries which had been lost in wartime. It also began offering new products, such as a mechanical pencil, ballpoint pens, plastic slide rules (instead of wood), and an India ink drawing pen. The Faber-Castell logo was changed in 1950 to an oval design, incorporating the Faber-Castell family crest and the green color which the company had been using since 1905.

Today, the company operates 10 factories and 22 sales units, with six in Europe, four in Asia, three in North America, five in South America, and one each in Australia and New Zealand. The Faber-Castell Group employs a staff of approximately 6,500 and does business in more than 120 countries.

== Products ==
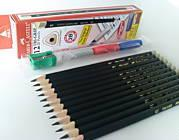
Grip pencils and a sharpener

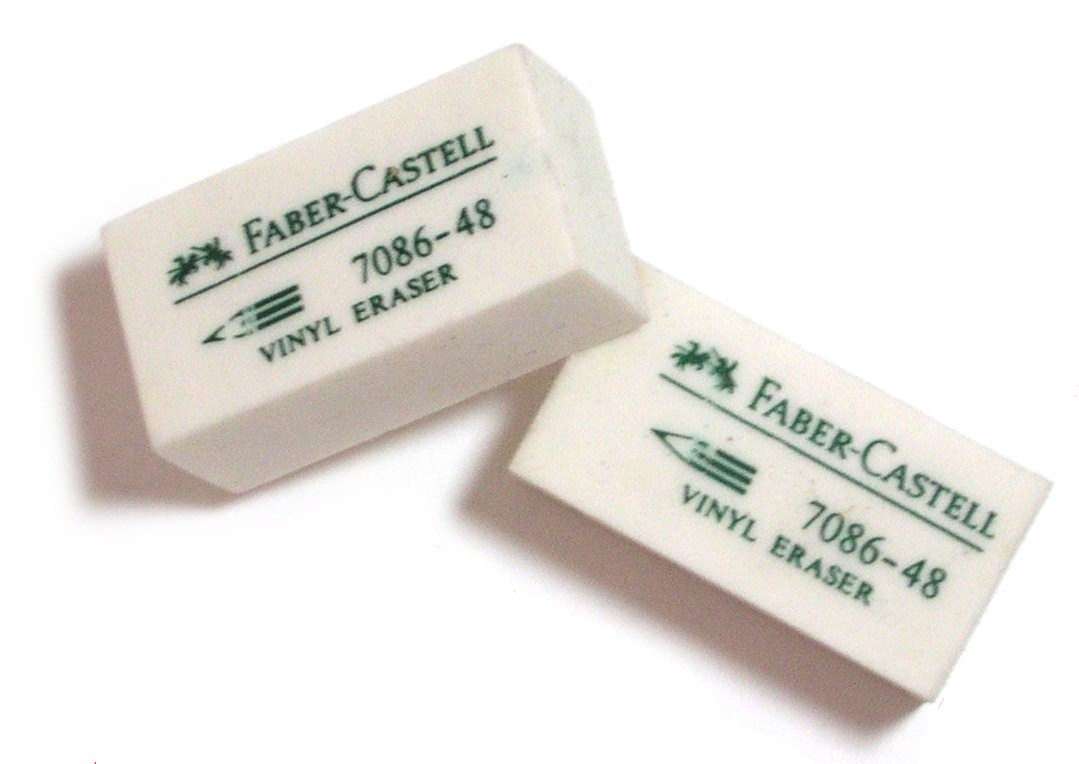
Erasers

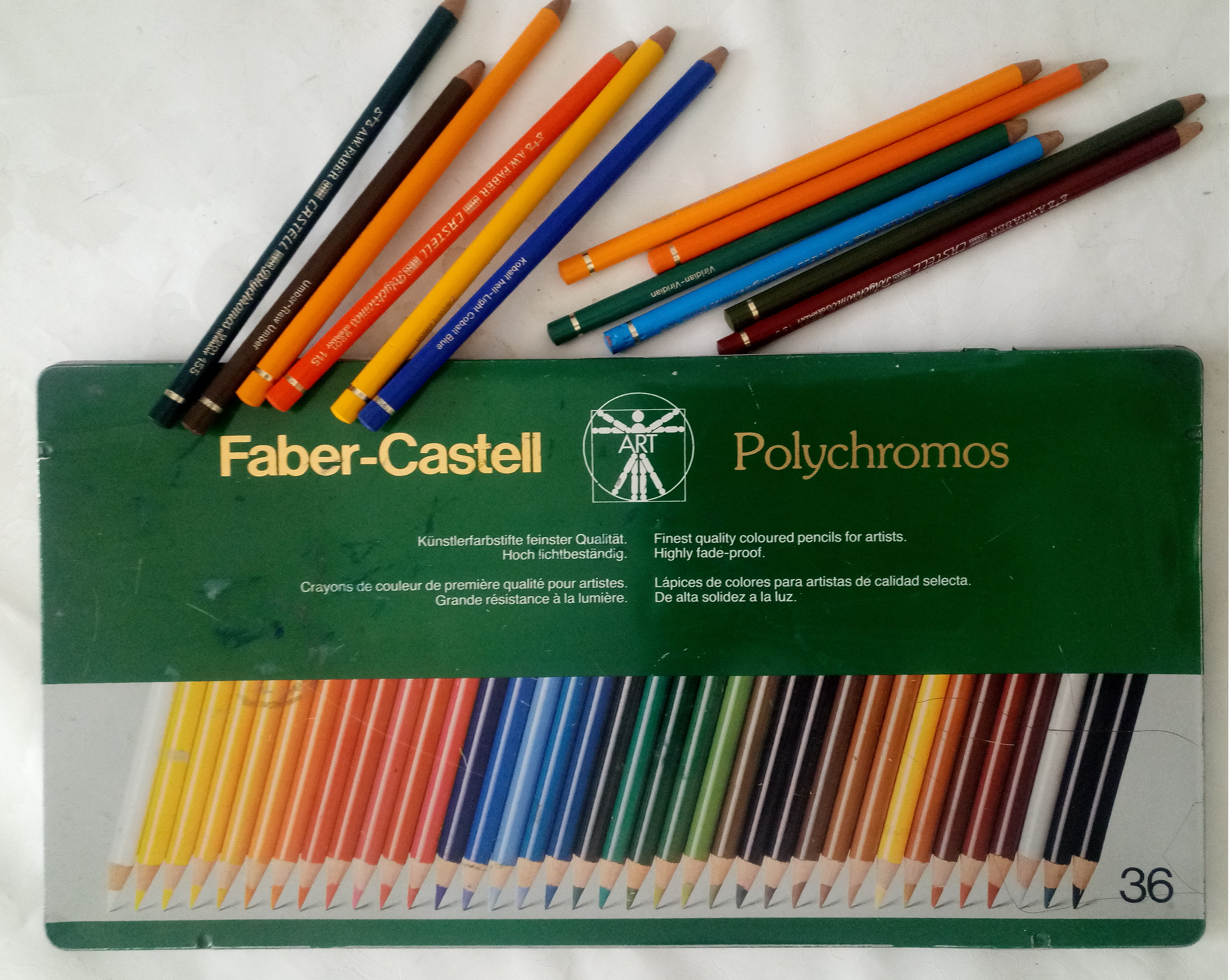
Polychromos pencil line

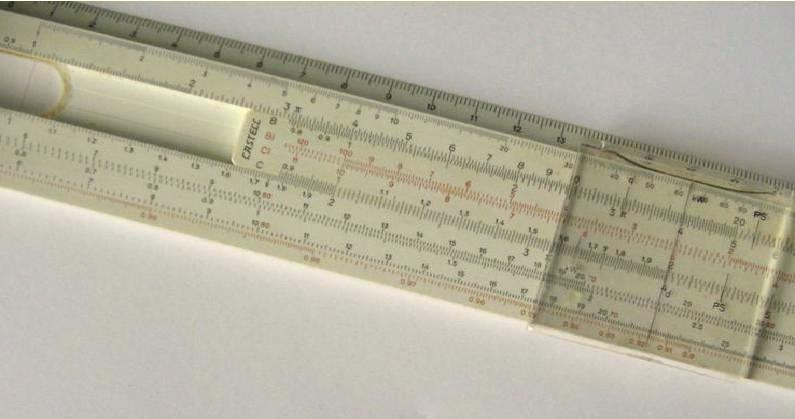
Slide rule

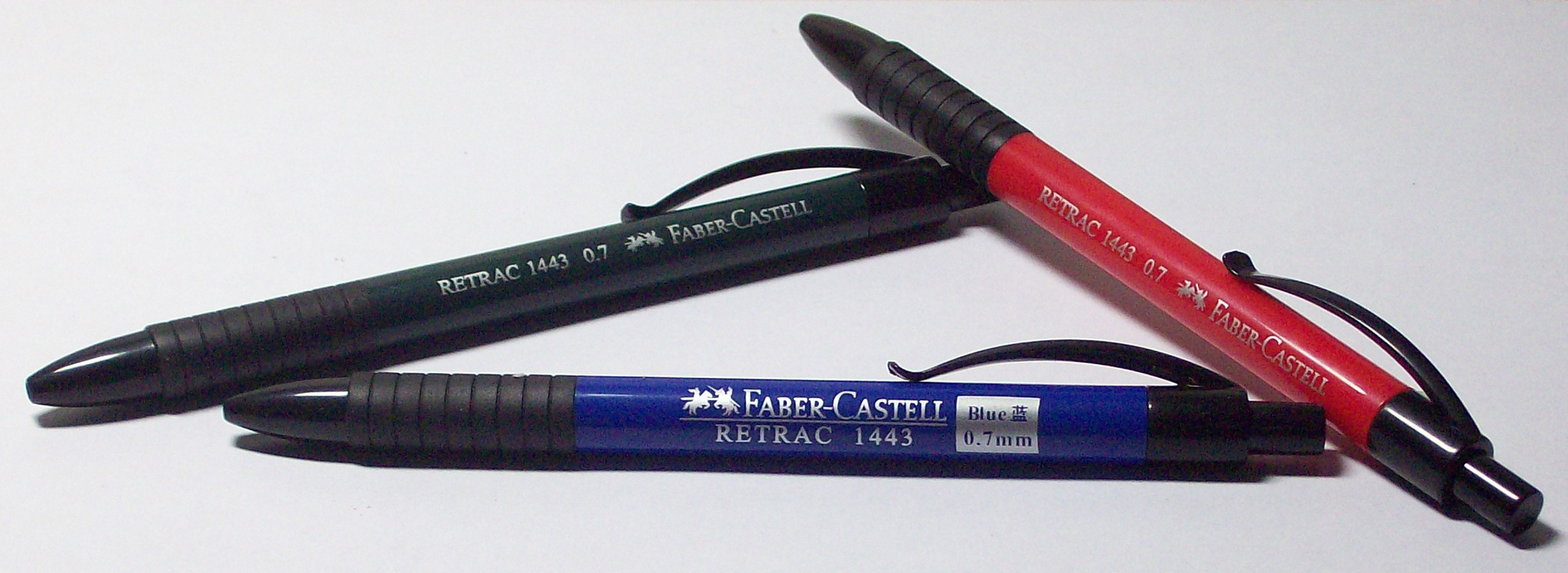
Ballpoint pens

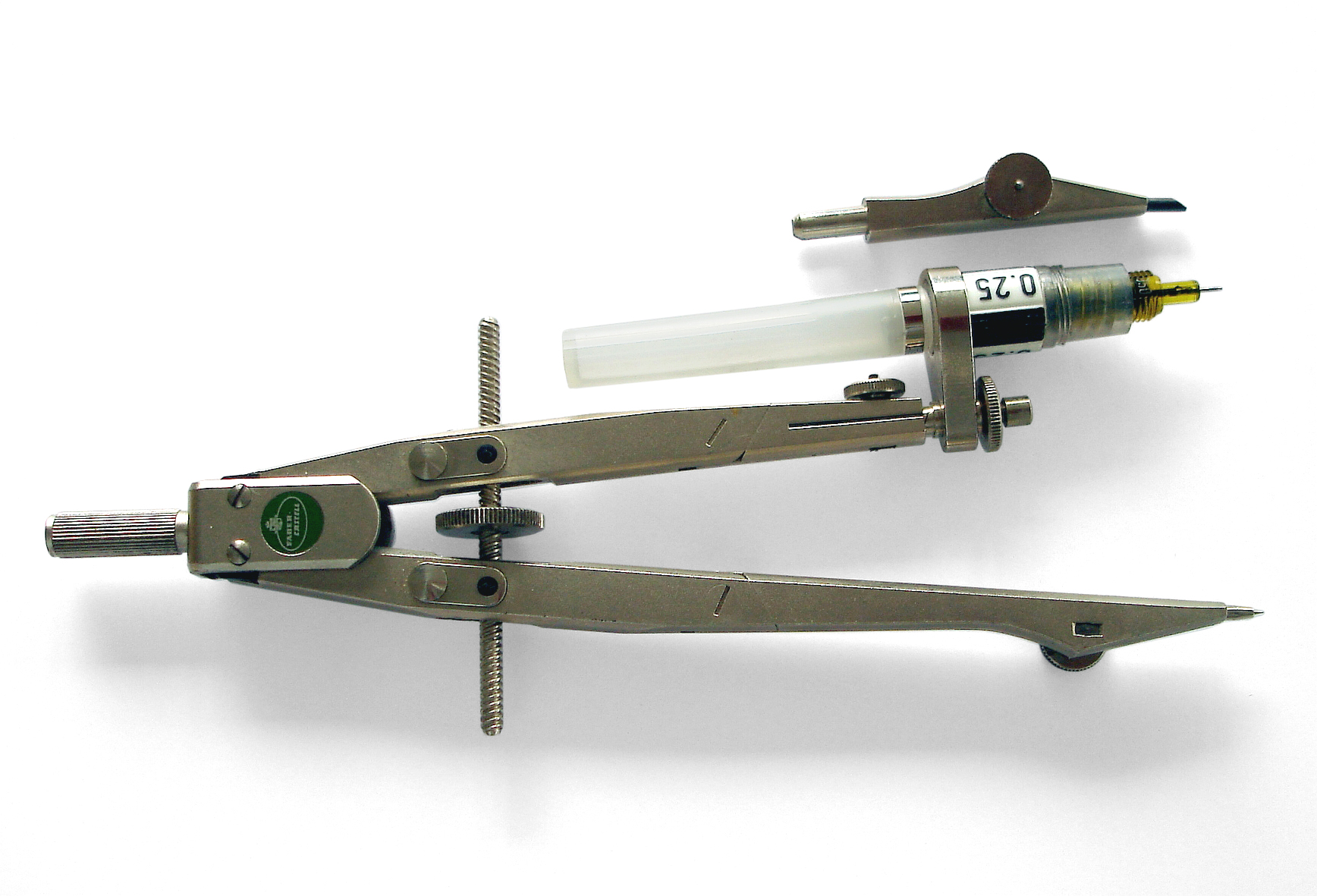
Compass and technical pen

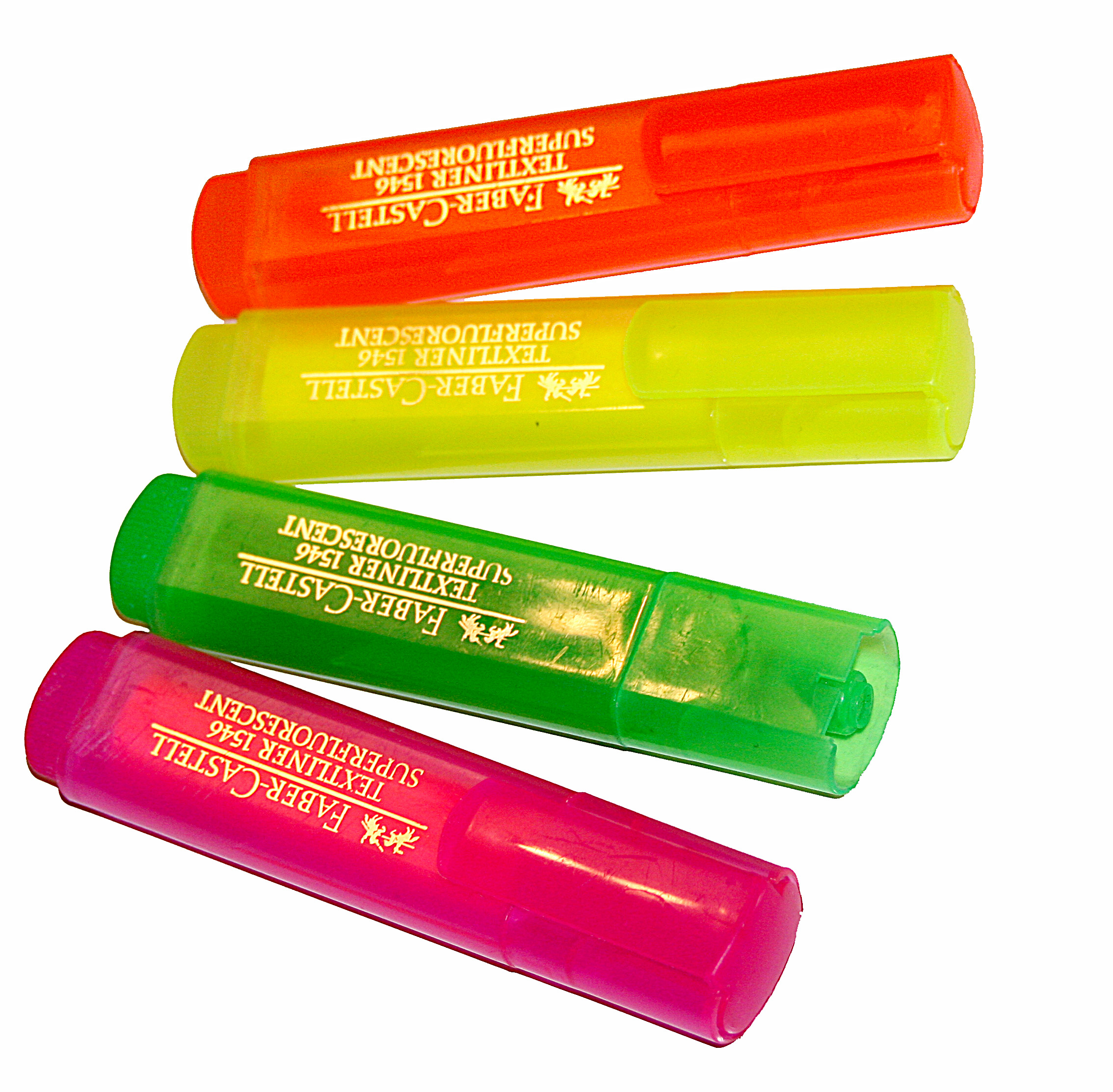
Marker pens

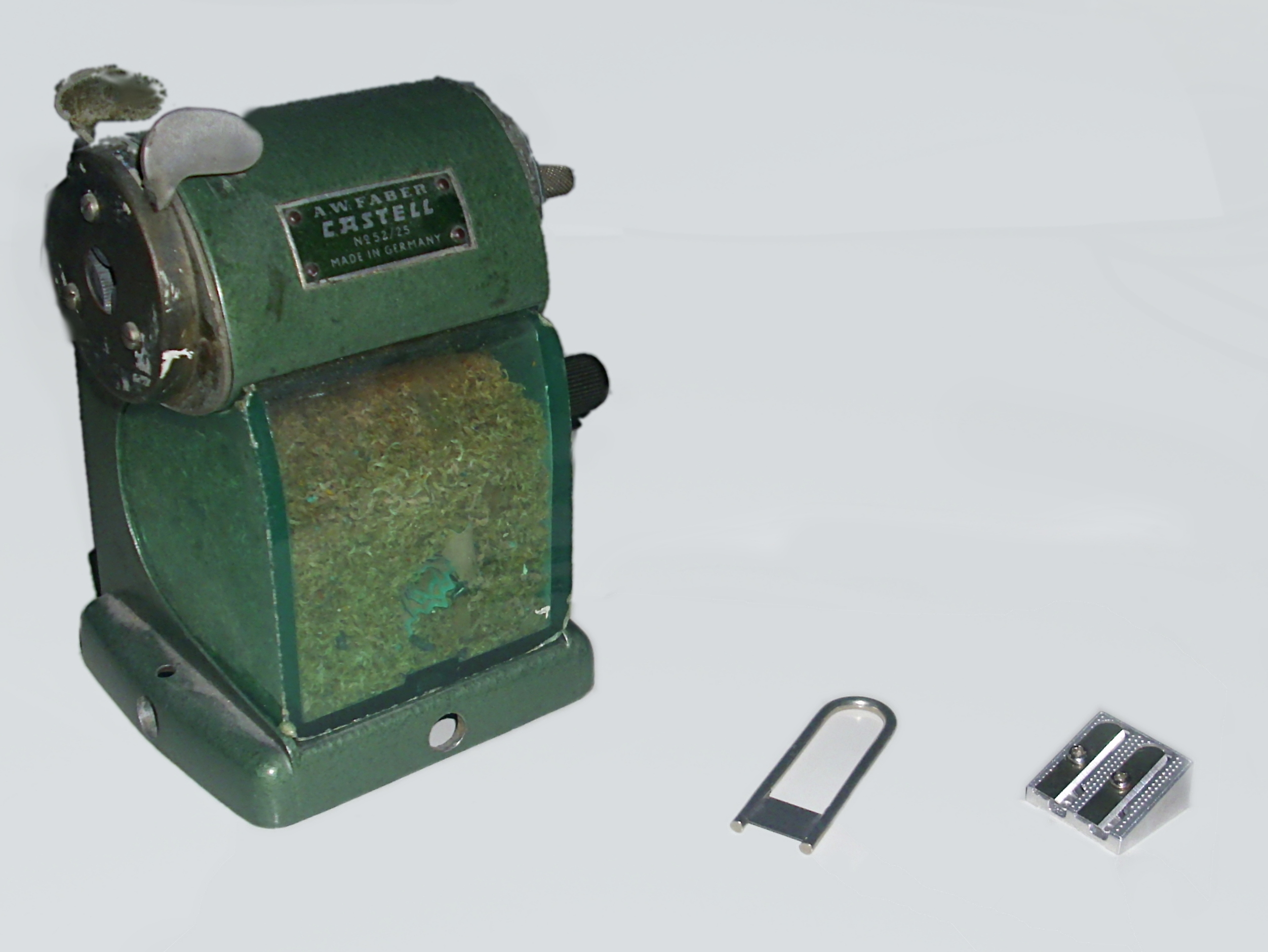
Vintage pencil sharpener

Beginning in the 1850s Faber started to use graphite from Siberia and cedar wood from Florida to produce its pencils.

Product lines include: Albrecht Dürer (artists' watercolor products), Castell 9000 (graphite pencils), e-motion (fountain pens), Goldfaber (watercolor pencils, color pencils, graphite pencils, markers), Grip 2001 (graphite pencils), Pitt Artist Pen (pigment ink pens), Polychromos (artists' color pencils), and TK Fine (mechanical pencils).

Faber-Castell is well known for its brand of Pitt Artist pens. The pens, used by comic and manga artists such as Adam Hughes, contain an India ink that is both acid-free and archival, and come in a variety of colors.

The following chart contains all the Faber-Castell product lines.

Category	Products
Professional Art and Graphic (Green Line)	Pencils (graphite and color), pastels, charcoals, erasers, sharpeners, water color markers, India ink based brush pens and fineliners.
Kids & School Art and Graphic (Red Line)	Pencils, watercolors, brushes, markers, crayons, erasers, sharpeners, modeling dough, oil pastels, papers, connector pens
Technical Drawing (Green Line)	Mechanical pencils, refills
Pens	Fountain pens, ballpoint pens, rollerball pens, refills
Luxury Pens	Fountain pens, ballpoint pen
Papers	Notebooks, diaries, creative papers, reams, calendars

From about 1880 to 1975 Faber-Castell was also one of the world's major manufacturers of slide rules, the best known of which was the 2/83N.

== Manufacturing ==
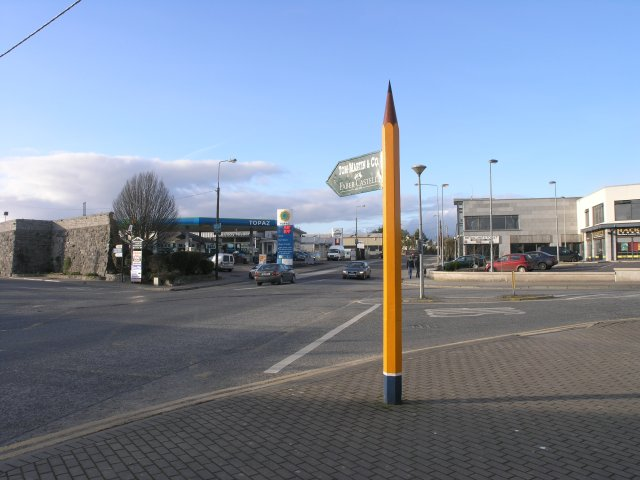
Pencil-shaped signpost to the former Faber-Castell plant in Fermoy

There are about 16 manufacturing plants (in 10 countries) which mainly manufacture writing instruments. The first plant outside Germany opened in Fermoy, Ireland, in January 1955, manufacturing first pencils and later also ballpoint pens; it closed at the end of 1990.

Country	Plant name	Year incorporated	Products manufactured
Costa Rica	Neily	1996	Pencils (graphite and colour)
Peru	Lima	1965	Erasers, rules and writing equipment, and finetip and colour markers
Colombia	Bogotá	1976	Wax crayons and drawing accessories
Brazil	Prata	1989	Nurseries for pine trees and sawmill
Brazil	Manaus	1989	Erasers, rules and writing equipment
Brazil	São Carlos	1950s	Pencils (graphite and colour), makeup, school line (pencils, sharpeners, poster and finger paints, crayons, markers) technical and fine arts line (permanent markers), office line (highlighter, executive and promotional pens), notebooks and creative papers
India	Goa	1998	Erasers, rules and writing equipment, and finetip and colour markers
Austria	Engelhartszell	1963	Highlighters and permanent-ink markers (manufacturing, assembly and paints)
Malaysia	Kuala Lumpur	1978	Research & Development, Asia and Pacific office Sales, school line (pencils, erasers and writing products)
Nigeria	Enugu	1961	Makeup Products
China	Guangzhou	2000	school line (sharpeners, erasers and writing instruments)
Indonesia	Bekasi	1990	Connector pens and pencils (graphite and color)
Germany	Stein	1761	Research & Development, global sales and marketing office, school line (pencils, erasers and writing products), premium line (graphite and color pencils, watercolor markers, India ink pens, erasers and writing products)

== See also ==
- Patrick Faber-Castell
- Faber-Castell family
- Eberhard Faber
- Blackwing 602
- Rotring
- Staedtler
