= Fortress church =

Fortified church used also as a retreat

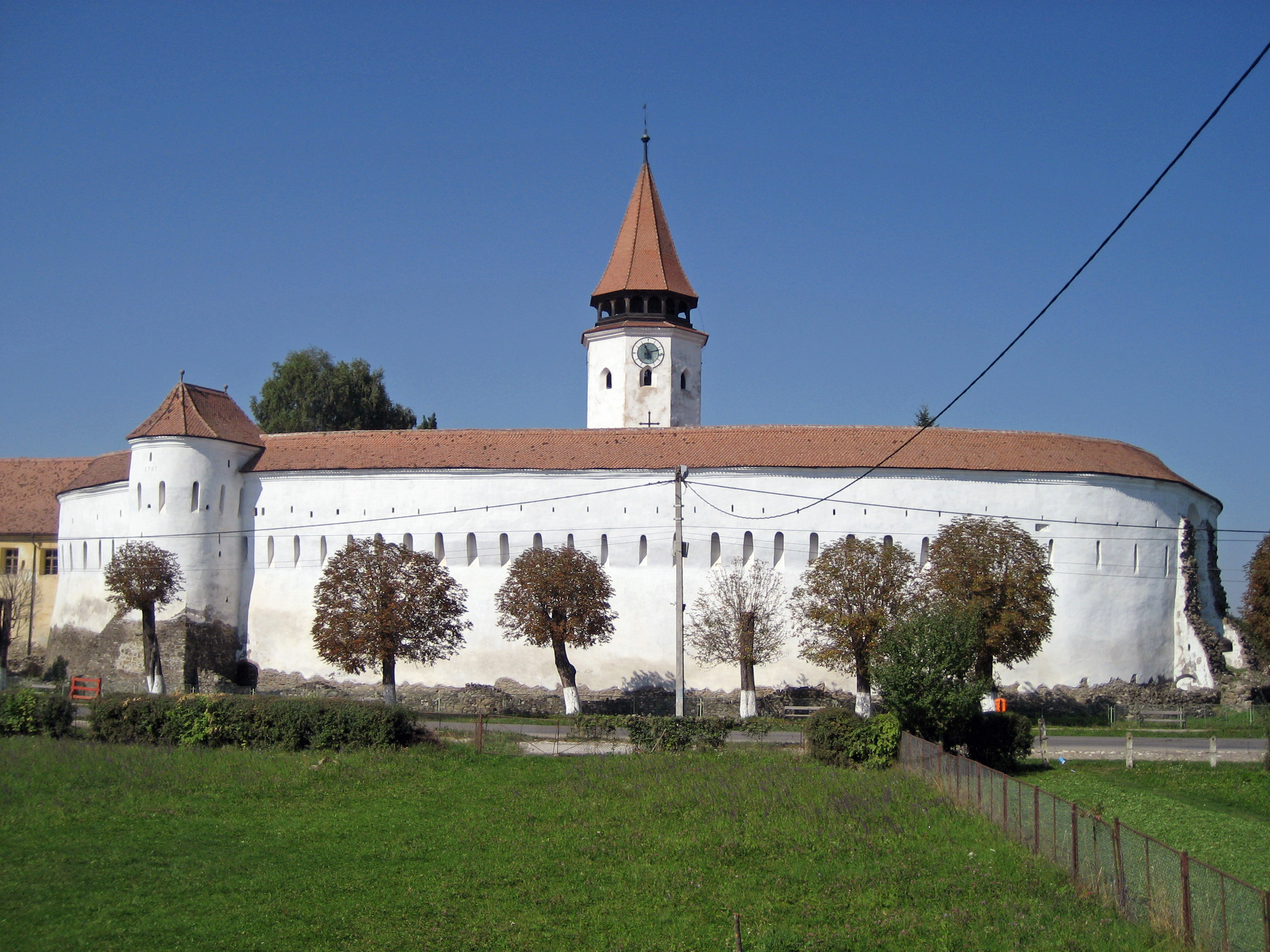
Fortress church in Tartlau, Transylvania

A fortress church (German: Kirchenburg) is a particular type of church that, in addition to its religious functions, is also used by the local population as a retreat and defensive position, similar to a refuge castle. A fortress church usually implies that the church is enclosed by its own fortifications, such as curtain walls and defensive towers. By comparison, a church with simple defensive features, such as battlements and embrasures on the church itself, is usually just referred to as a fortified church.

== Architectural history ==
The fortress church is typically surrounded by defensive walls equipped with wall towers and wall walks. It is a development of the fortified churches, whose defensive walls were also the actual walls of the church. Although the terms are often used interchangeably without clear distinction, a fortified church properly refers to a single building whereas a fortress church is a building complex. Construction of defensible churches evolved over time. Earlier constructions included a church surrounded by barns in which a siege of several days could be endured. Then fortified cemeteries (Wehrfriedhof) arose and simple fortified churches, to finally the fortress church. The fortress churches surviving today date from the 15th century.

Unlike the populations of towns and cities, villagers could not afford to build defences around an entire settlement. The fortress churches were often the only stone building in such places and so were the population's only refuge from the violence of the military conflicts, the local raiding and plundering that often accompanied military campaigns, as well as providing defence against nomadic bands of marauders.

In the Early Middle Ages, especially in recently Christianised regions like Saxony, former bishop's seats were designed as fortress churches. In Saxony they were referred to as a Domburg or "cathedral castle". Fortress churches are especially common in Franconia, South France and Transylvania (Romania). Particularly in Transylvania, a historically German settlement area, there are well over a hundred fortress churches of which seven have been designated as UNESCO World Heritage Sites (Birthälm/Biertan in 1993, Kelling/Calnic, Wurmloch/Valea Viilor, Dersch/Darjiu, Deutsch-Weißkirch/Viscri, Keisd/Saschiz and Tartlau/Prejmer in 1999). These were established in order to defend against successive Turkish invasions.

Fortress churches have not survived in North Germany, most likely due to the re-use of their stone for other building purposes during period of scarcity of such materials. The only well-known fortress church in the coastal region of North Germany is the Church of St. Dionysius in Bremerhaven-Wulsdorf, which is recorded as having a field stone curtain wall up to 3.60 metres high.

== List of places with surviving fortress churches ==
=== Austria ===
- Eisenerz
- Maria Saal

=== Croatia ===
- Kutina

=== Germany ===
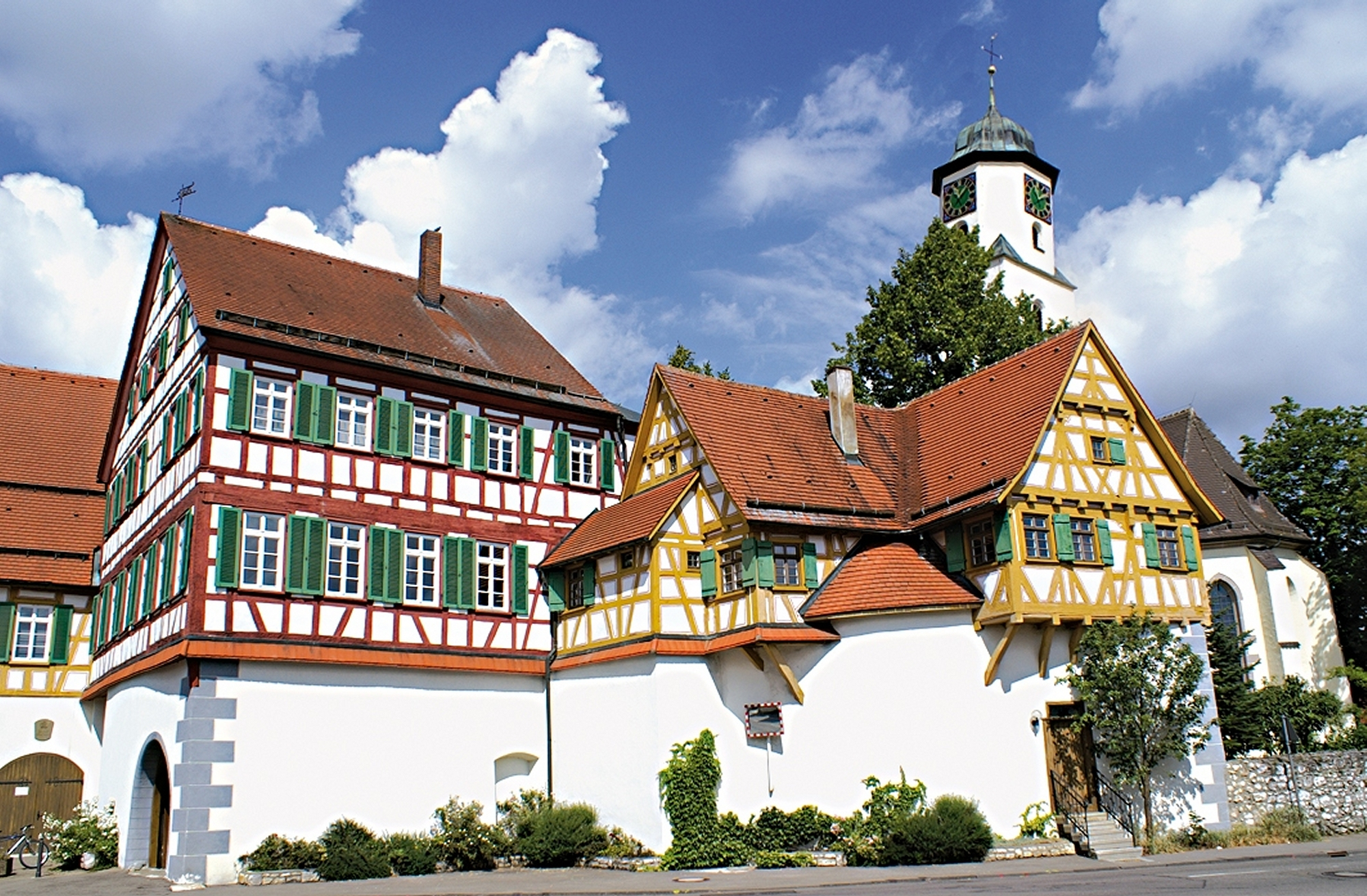
Laichingen in the Swabian Jura

==== Baden-Württemberg ====
- Laichingen
- Lienzingen
- Merklingen (Weil der Stadt)
- Sülzbach
- Weissach

==== Bavaria ====
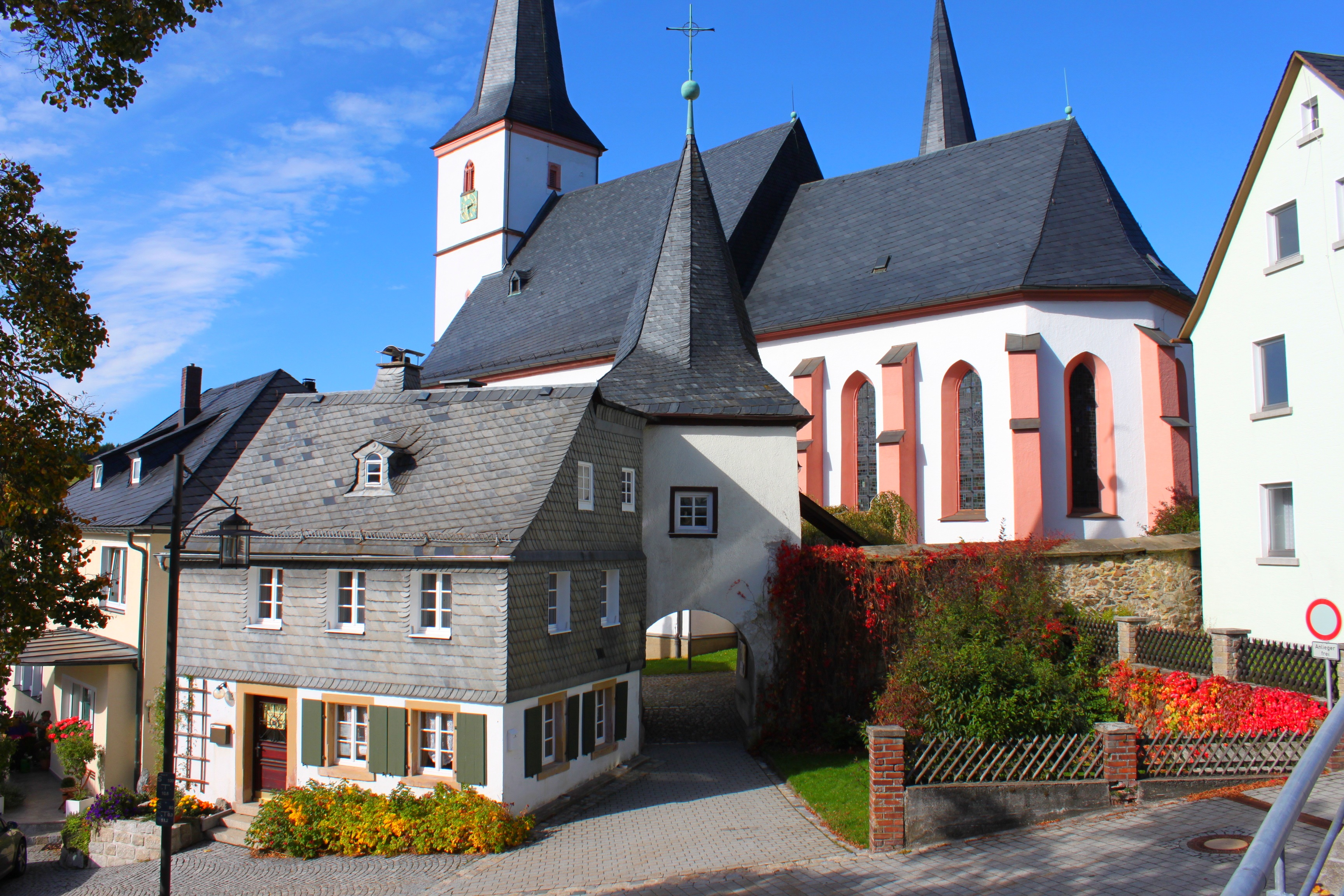
The fortress church of The Holy Spirit in Grafengehaig

County of Kulmbach

- Grafengehaig

County of Eichstätt:

- Kinding

County of Bad Kissingen:

- Diebach
- Fuchsstadt

Landkreis Cham

- Bad Kötzting

County of Erlangen-Höchstadt

- Hannberg

County of Forchheim:

- Effeltrich
- Hetzles

County of Haßberge:

- Aidhausen

County of Kitzingen:

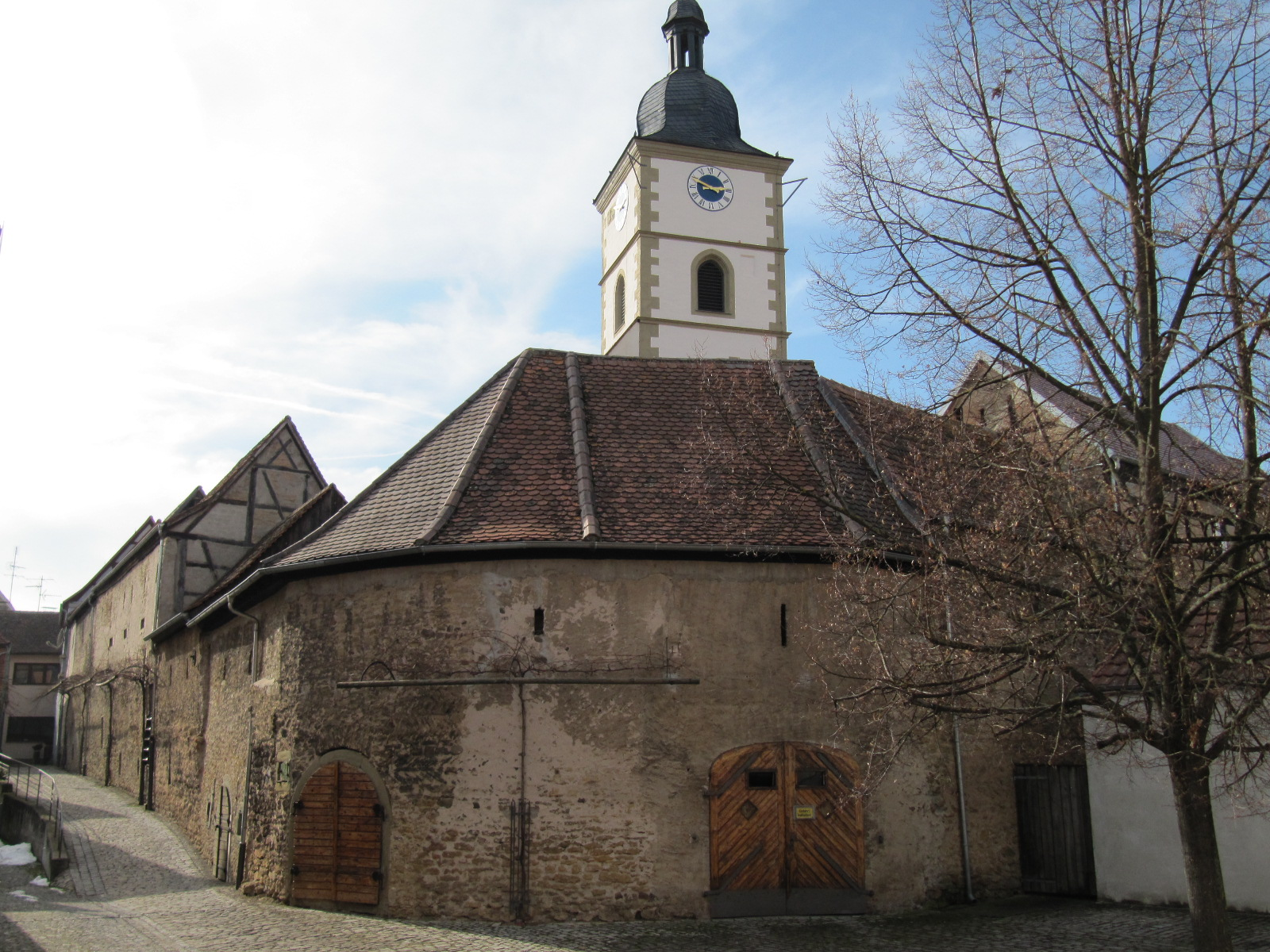
Kleinlangheim fortress church

- Abtswind
- Eichfeld
- Hüttenheim
- Iffigheim
- Kleinlangheim fortress church
- Krautheim
- Markt Einersheim
- Markt Herrnsheim
- Marktsteft
- Iphofen - (Mönchsondheim fortress church museum)
- Nenzenheim
- Segnitz
- Stadelschwarzach
- Tiefenstockheim
- Wiesenbronn
- Willanzheim

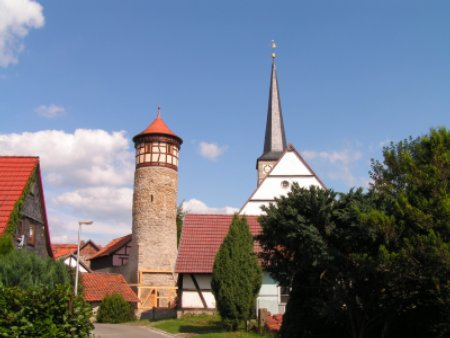
The Hutturm tower of the fortress church at Vachdorf

County of Main-Spessart:

- Aschfeld (newe der kirch)
- Stetten

County of Miltenberg:

- Kleinheubach

County of Neustadt/Aisch – Bad Windsheim:

- Burgbernheim

County of Rhön-Grabfeld:

- Bad Königshofen im Grabfeld-Althausen
- Heustreu
- Hollstadt
- Mittelstreu
- Nordheim vor der Rhön
- Oberstreu
- Ostheim vor der Rhön
- Serrfeld
- Stockheim
- Unsleben
- Wülfershausen

County of Schweinfurt:

- Donnersdorf
- Euerbach
- Geldersheim
- Gochsheim
- Schleerieth

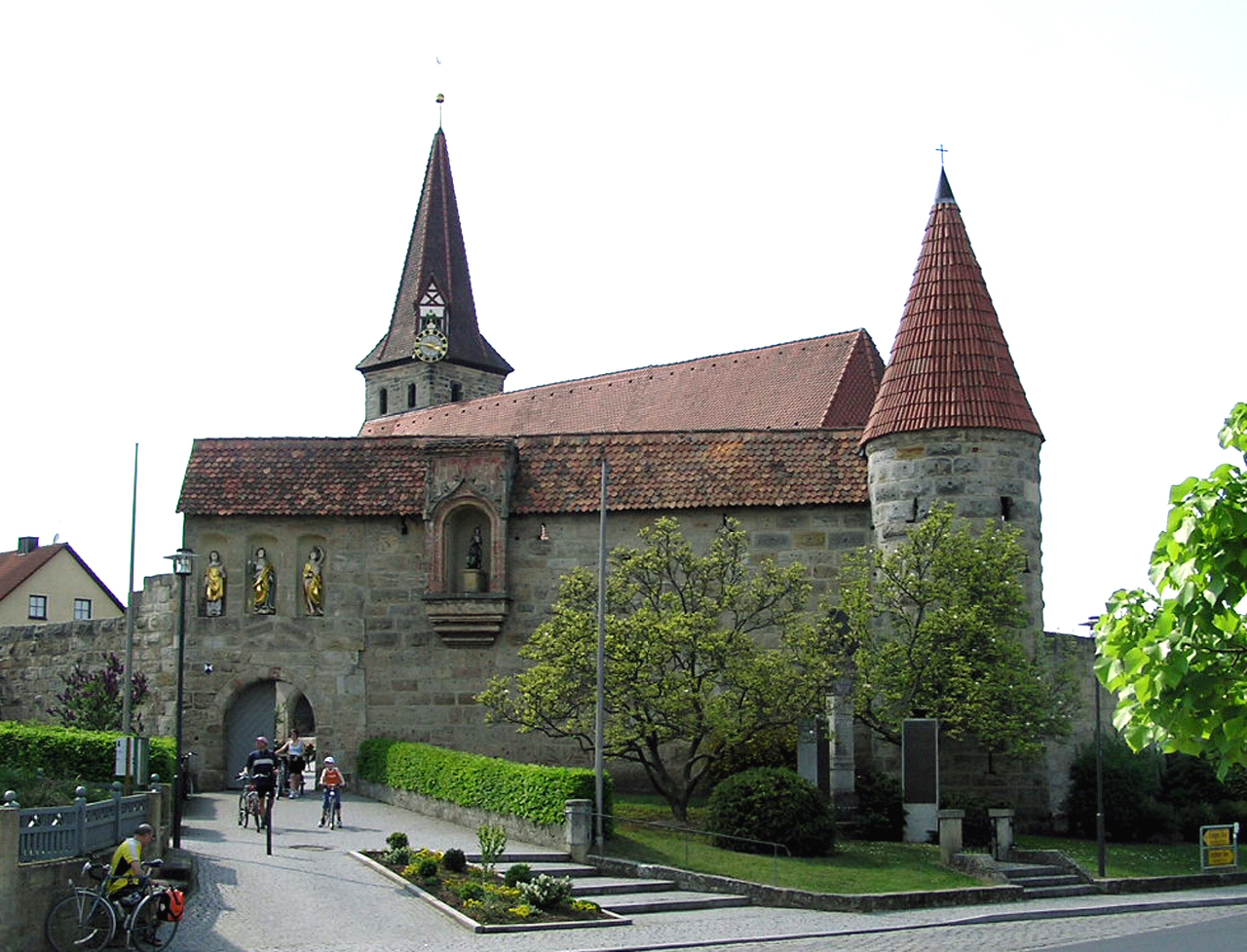
Effeltrich

- Schnackenwerth
- Schwanfeld
- Zeilitzheim

County of Würzburg:

- Goßmannsdorf
- Thüngersheim

County of Passau:

- Kößlarn

City of Nuremberg:

- Kraftshof

==== Lower Saxony ====
County of Osnabrück:

- Ankum

==== Thuringia ====
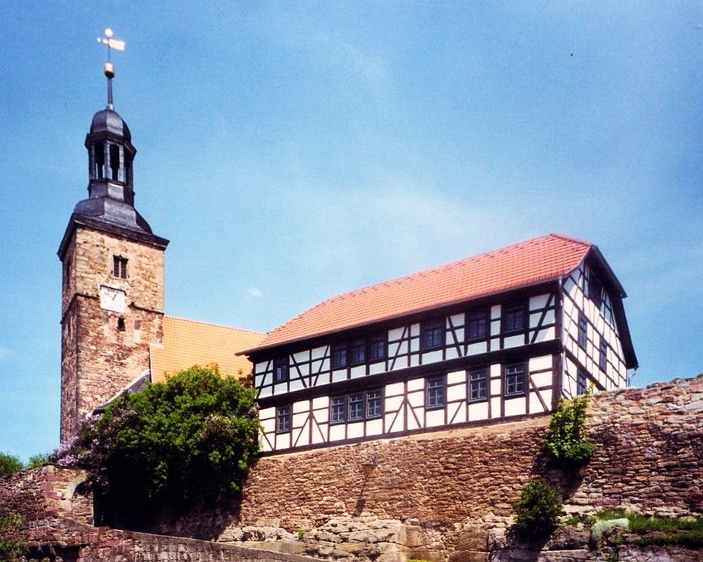
Walldorf

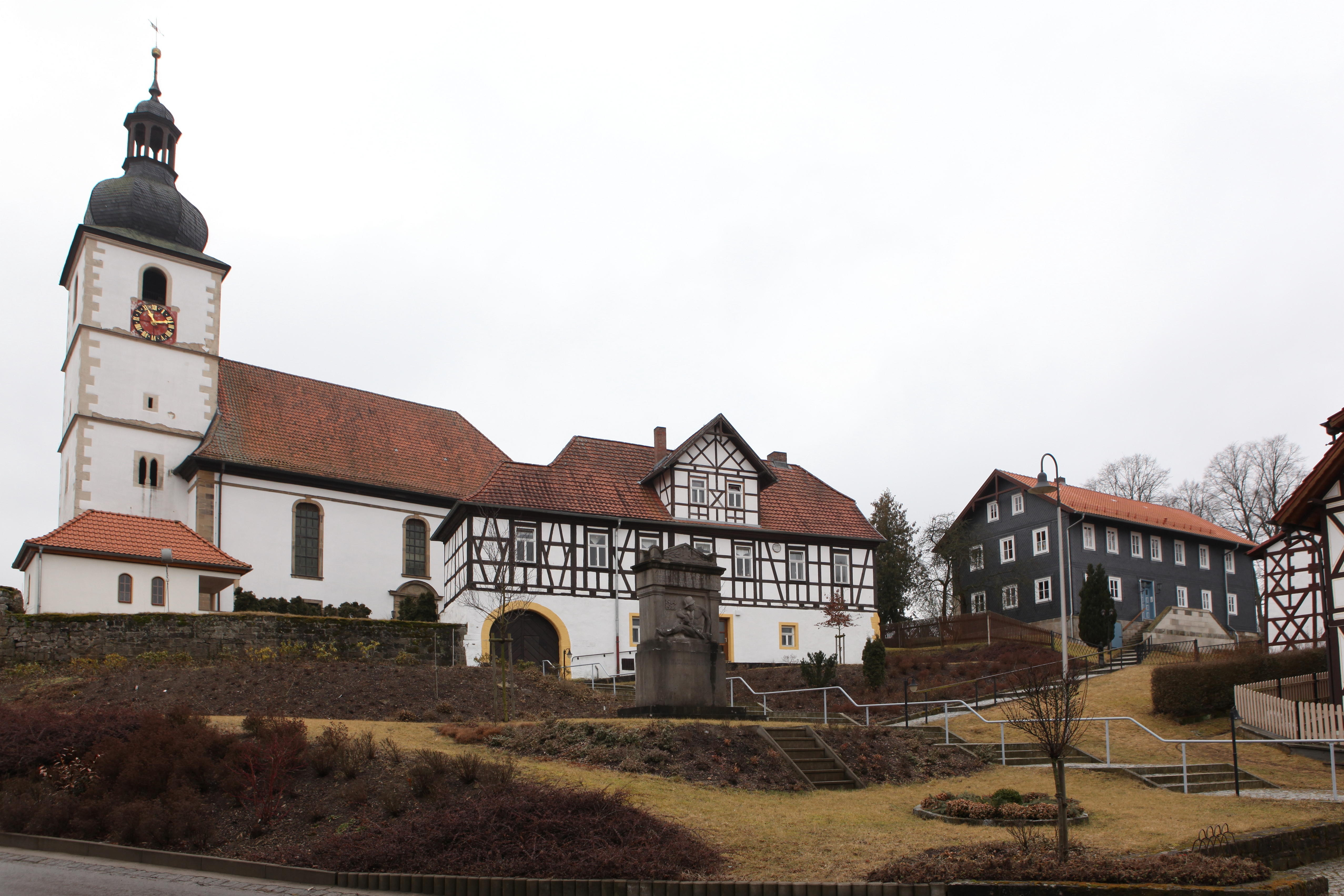
St. Michael in Hellingen fortress church

County of Hildburghausen:

- Ummerstadt
- Streufdorf
- Gellershausen
- Hellingen

County of Schmalkalden Meiningen:

- Rohr (Thuringia)
- Walldorf fortress church
- Vachdorf

==== Saxony ====
County of Görlitz

- Horka

=== Luxembourg ===
- Echternach: the former parish church of St. Peter and Paul was built inside Roman walls that protected it until the 18th century.
- Luxembourg city: there is still a tower of the otherwise totally destroyed fortified monastery of Altmünster
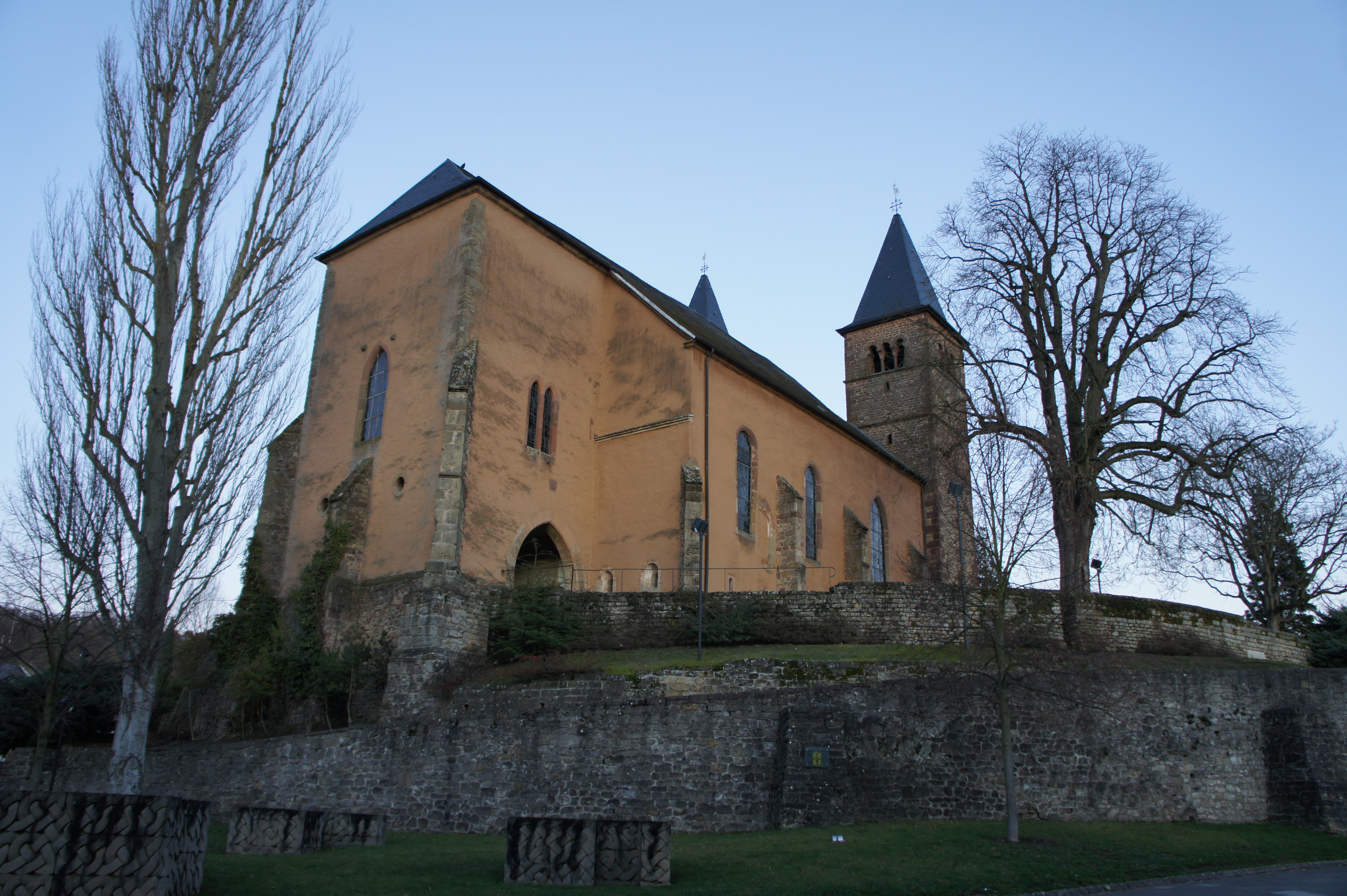
Former parish church of St. Peter and Paul, Echternach

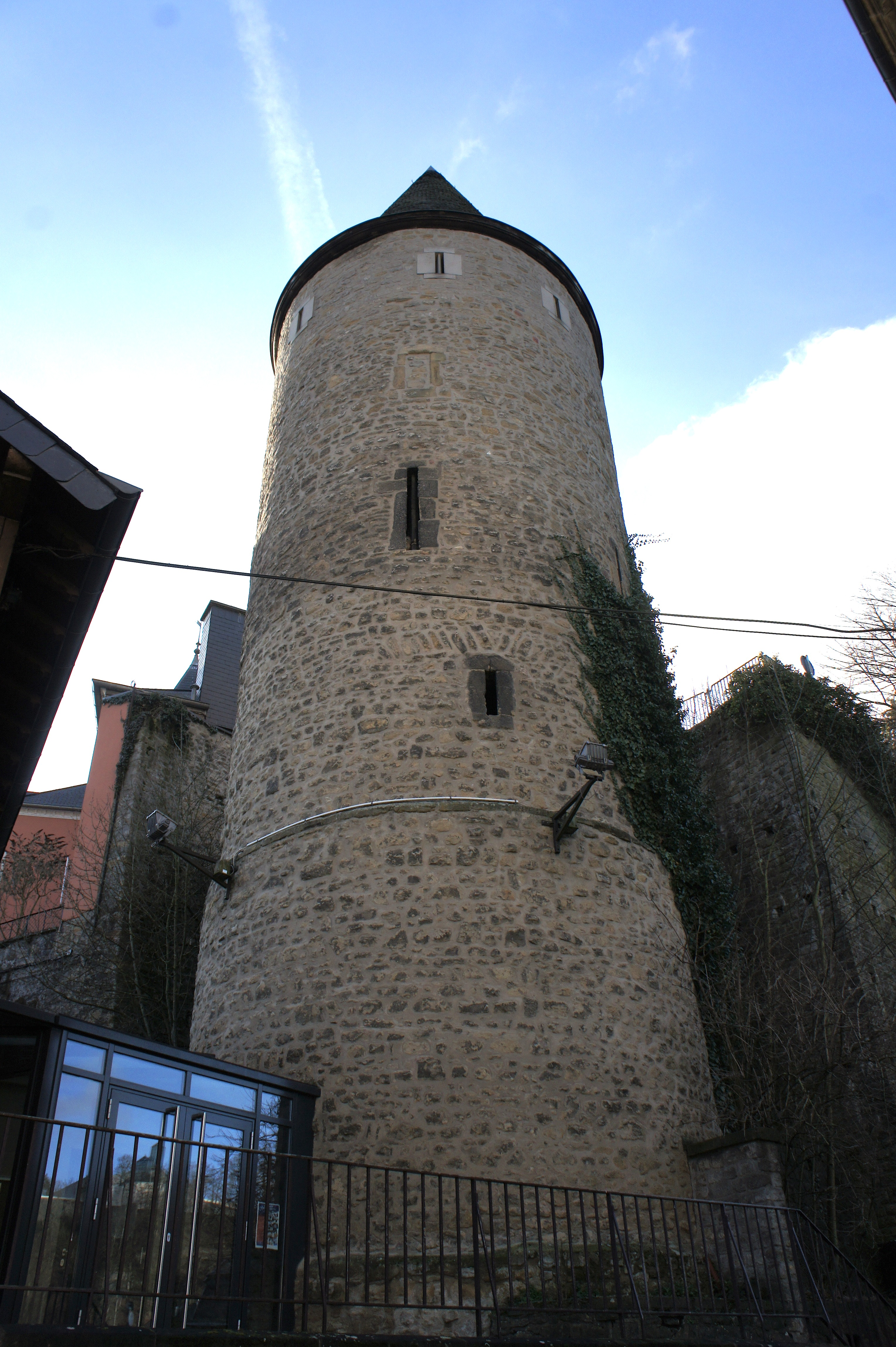
Tower of the old Altmünster Abbey, Luxembourg

=== Philippines ===
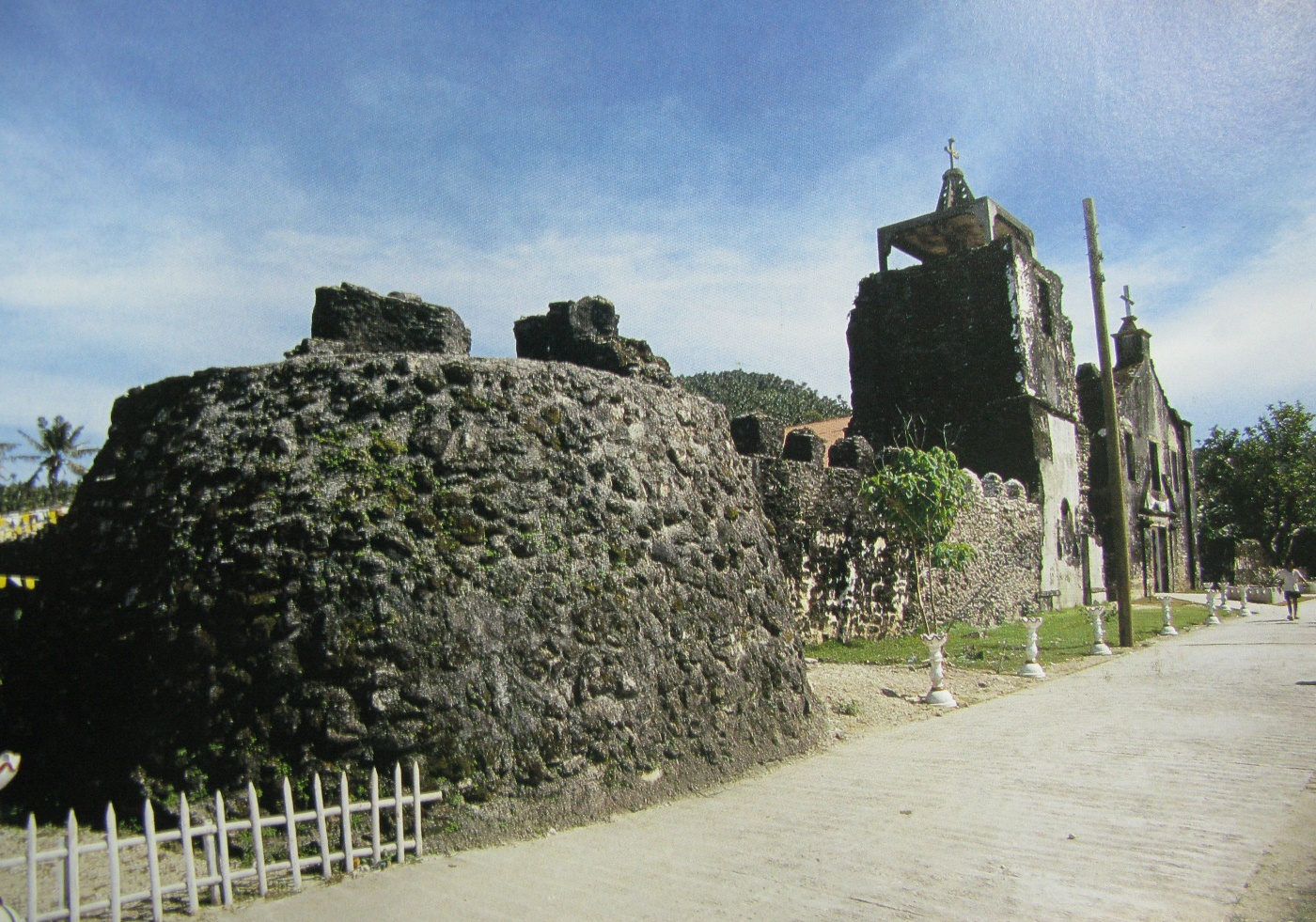
The fortress church in Capul, Northern Samar

- San Agustin Church Cuyo, Palawan
- San Ignacio de Loyola Parish Church, Northern Samar

=== Serbia ===
- Manasija
- Ravanica

=== Switzerland ===
- Müstair/GR: Abbey and UNESCO World Heritage Site
- Muttenz/BL: Village church of St. Arbogast – a complete, Late Medieval fortress church
- Sion/VS: Valère Basilica

=== Romania (Transylvania) ===
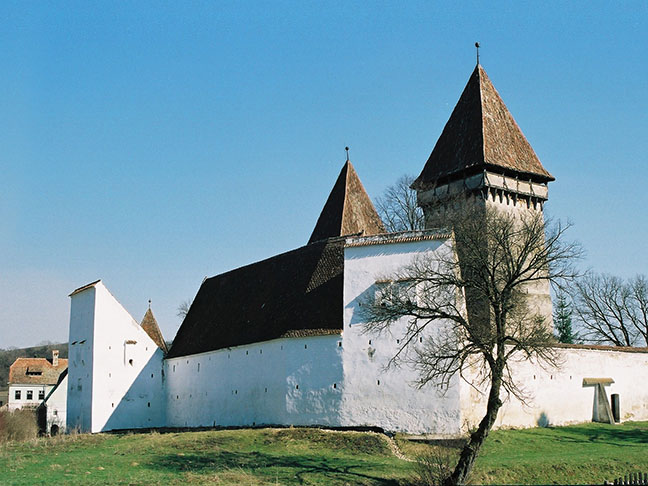
Dealu Frumos, Sibiu

Among the dozens of well-preserved fortified churches in Transylvania (present day Romania), seven of them are located in the UNESCO World Heritage Site inscribed in 1993 as the villages with fortified churches in Transylvania. Most, but not all of them were or still are church fortresses.

=== France ===
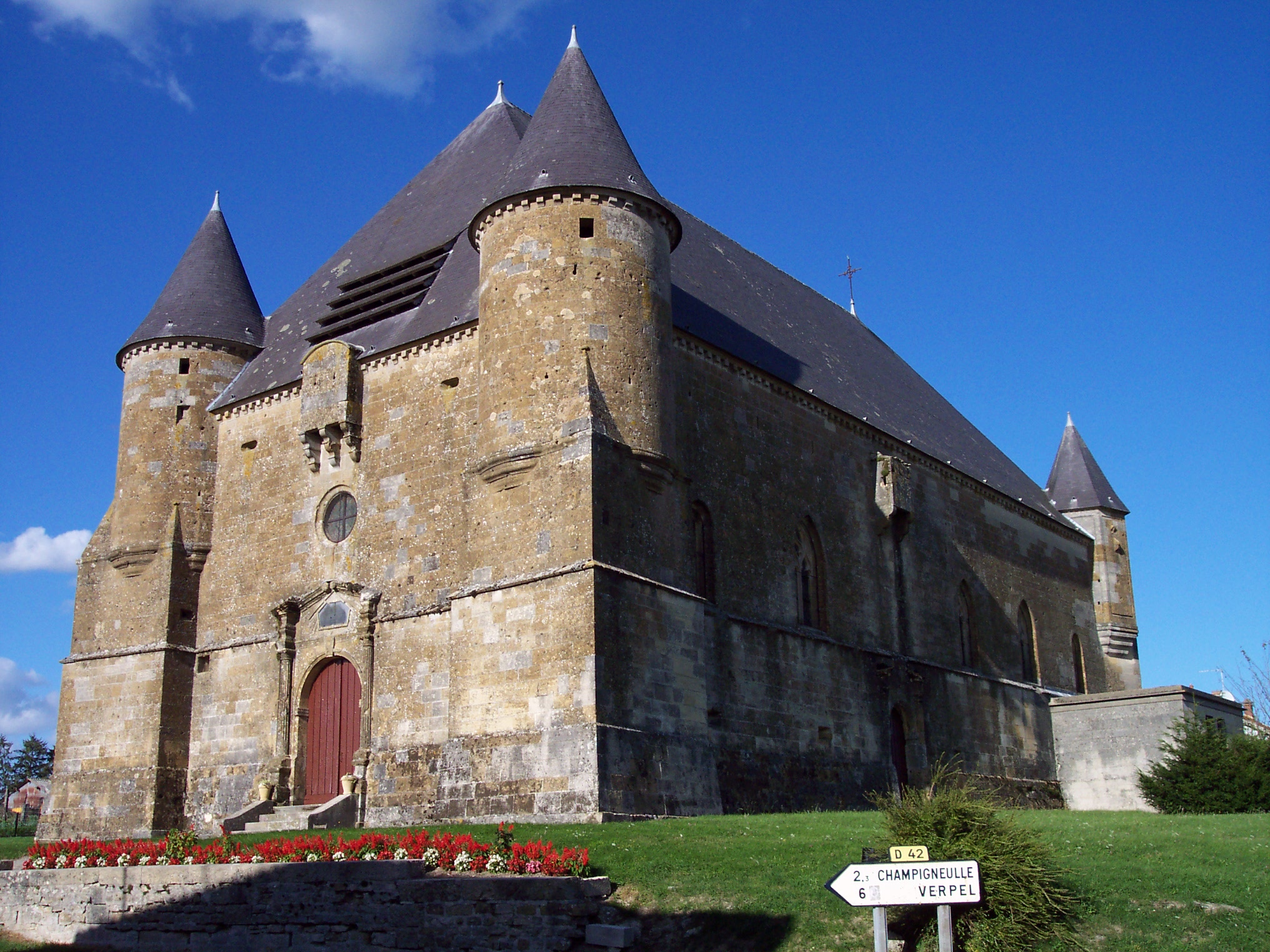
The fortress church in Saint-Juvin

- Saint-Brieuc Cathedral
- Saint-Juvin
- Quintenas
- Chassiers
- Sainte-Radegonde
- Monceau-sur-Oise
- Wimy
- Aouste
- Rocquigny
- Autreppes
- Archon
- Englancourt
- Burelles
- Woël
- Pérouges
- Grand-Brassac
- Fligny

=== Ukraine ===
- Mezhyrich

=== United Kingdom ===
- Tynemouth

== See also ==
- Fortified church
- Fortress synagogue

== Literature ==
- Karl Kolb: Wehrkirchen in Europa: eine Bild-Dokumentation. Echter, Würzburg, 1983, ISBN 3-429-00818-2
- Wolfram Freiherr von Erfa: Wehrkirchen in Oberfranken. Kulmbach, 1956
- Dirk Höhne: Bemerkungen zur sogenannten Wehrhaftigkeit mittelalterlicher Landkirchen. In: Burgen und Schlösser in Sachsen-Anhalt 12 (2003), pp. 119–149 - kritisch u.a. zu H. Müller
- Dirk Höhne/Christine Kratzke (eds.): Die mittelalterliche Dorfkirche in den Neuen Bundesländern II. Funktion, Form, Bedeutung (= Hallesche Beiträge zur Kunstgeschichte 8), Halle, 2006 (elf Aufsätze zum Thema "Wehrhaftigkeit von Dorfkirchen").
- Norbert Klaus Fuchs: Das Heldburger Land–ein historischer Reiseführer; Verlag Rockstuhl, Bad Langensalza, 2013, ISBN 978-3-86777-349-2
- Hans u. Berta Luschin: Kärntens schönste Wehrkirchen. Carinthia, Klagenfurt, 1985, ISBN 3-85378-237-X
- Karl Kolb: Wehrkirchen und Kirchenburgen in Franken. 2nd edition. Echter, Würzburg, 1981, ISBN 3-921056-16-0.
- Heinz Müller: Wehrhafte Kirchen in Sachsen und Thüringen. Oberlausitzer Verlag, Waltersdorf, 1992, ISBN 3-928492-26-8
- Ursula Pfistermeister: Wehrhaftes Franken : Burgen, Kirchenburgen, Stadtmauern. Carl, Nuremberg, 2000, ISBN 3-418-00387-7
- Gerhard Seib: Wehrhafte Kirchen in Nordhessen. In: Beiträge zur hessischen Geschichte 14. Trautvetter & Fischer, Marburg an der Lahn, 1999. ISBN 3-87822-111-8
- Reinhard Schmitt: „Wehrhafte Kirchen" und der „befestigte Kirchhof“ von Walldorf, Kreis Schmalkalden-Meiningen. In: Burgen und Schlösser in Sachsen-Anhalt 9 2000, pp. 127–149 - kritisch u.a. zu G. Seib
- Michael Weithmann: Wehrkirchen in Oberbayern. Eine typologische Übersicht, in: Schönere Heimat ISSN 0177-4492. 1992, Issue 4, pp. 211–222.
- Joachim Zeune: Neue Forschungen an fränkischen Kirchenburgen. In: Burgenforschung aus Sachsen 5/6 1995, pp. 226–239 - kritisch hierzu, insbesondere zu den Publikationen von Kolb
- Hermann und Alida Fabini: Kirchenburgen in Siebenbürgen : Abbild und Selbstdarstellung siebenbürgisch-sächsischer Dorfgemeinschaften 2nd edn. Koehler und Amelang, Leipzig, 1991, ISBN 3-7338-0073-7
- Hermann Fabini: Atlas der siebenbürgisch-sächsischen Kirchenburgen und Dorfkirchen. Monumenta-Verlag, Hermannstadt, ISBN 3-929848-15-5; AKSL, Heidelberg 1999, ISBN 973-98825-0-1. – 527 fortress churches, all well known, are represented with floor plans and descriptions of their architectural history
- Heinrich Lamping: Kirchenburgen in Siebenbürgen. Geographische Analysen, Kurzbeschreibungen, Bilddokumentation. In: Frankfurter wirtschafts- und sozialgeographische Schriften 57. Selbstverlag des Instituts für Wirtschafts- und Sozialgeographie, Johann Wolfgang Goethe-Universität, Frankfurt, 1991.
- Arne Franke: Das wehrhafte Sachsenland. Kirchenburgen im südlichen Siebenbürgen. Deutsches Kulturforum östliches Europa, Potsdam, 2007, ISBN 3-936168-27-X; Kurzbeschreibung Das wehrhafte Sachsenland. Available online
