= Iphofen =

- Town
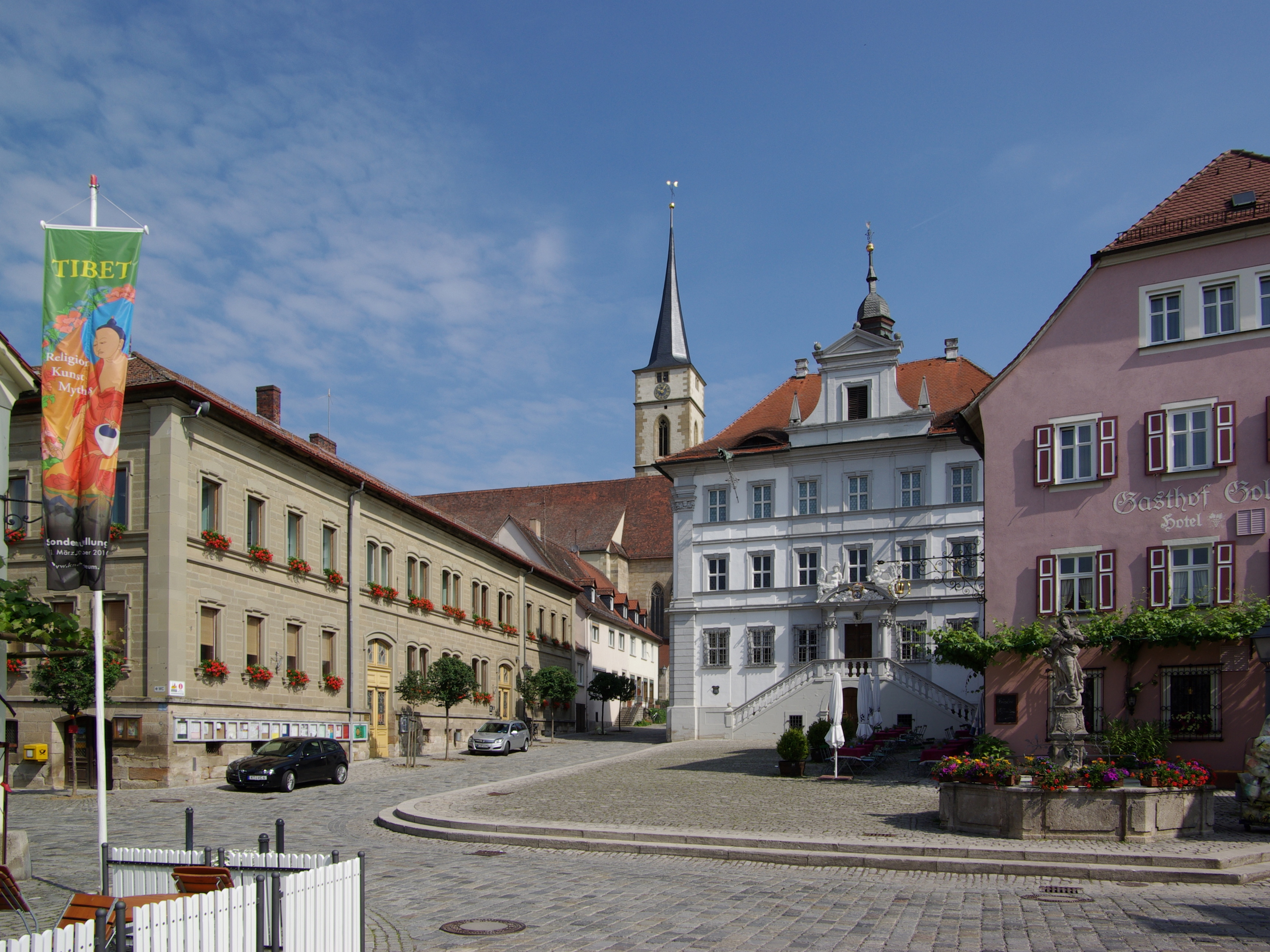
- Market square with St. Vitus, town hall and Marienbrunnen

- Coat of arms

- Location of Iphofen within Kitzingen district
- Interactive map of Iphofen
- Location within Germany Location within Bavaria
- Coordinates: 49°42′N 10°16′E
- Country: Germany
- State: Bavaria
- Admin. region: Unterfranken
- District: Kitzingen
- Municipal assoc.: Iphofen
- Subdivisions: 22 Gemeindeteile

Government
  - Mayor (2020–26): Dieter Lenzer (FW)

Area
  - Total: 78.06 km^{2} (30.14 sq mi)
- Elevation: 250 m (820 ft)

Population (2025-12-31)
  - Total: 4,822
  - Density: 61.77/km^{2} (160.0/sq mi)
- Time zone: UTC+01:00 (CET)
  - Summer (DST): UTC+02:00 (CEST)
- Postal codes: 97346
- Dialling codes: 09323
- Vehicle registration: KT
- Website: www.iphofen.de

Iphofen (German pronunciation: [ɪpˈhoːfn̩]) is a town in the district of Kitzingen in Bavaria, Germany. It has a population of around 4,500. Iphofen is known for its rare complete medieval town wall and other historic buildings as well as for being a location of wine production.

== Geography ==
=== Location ===
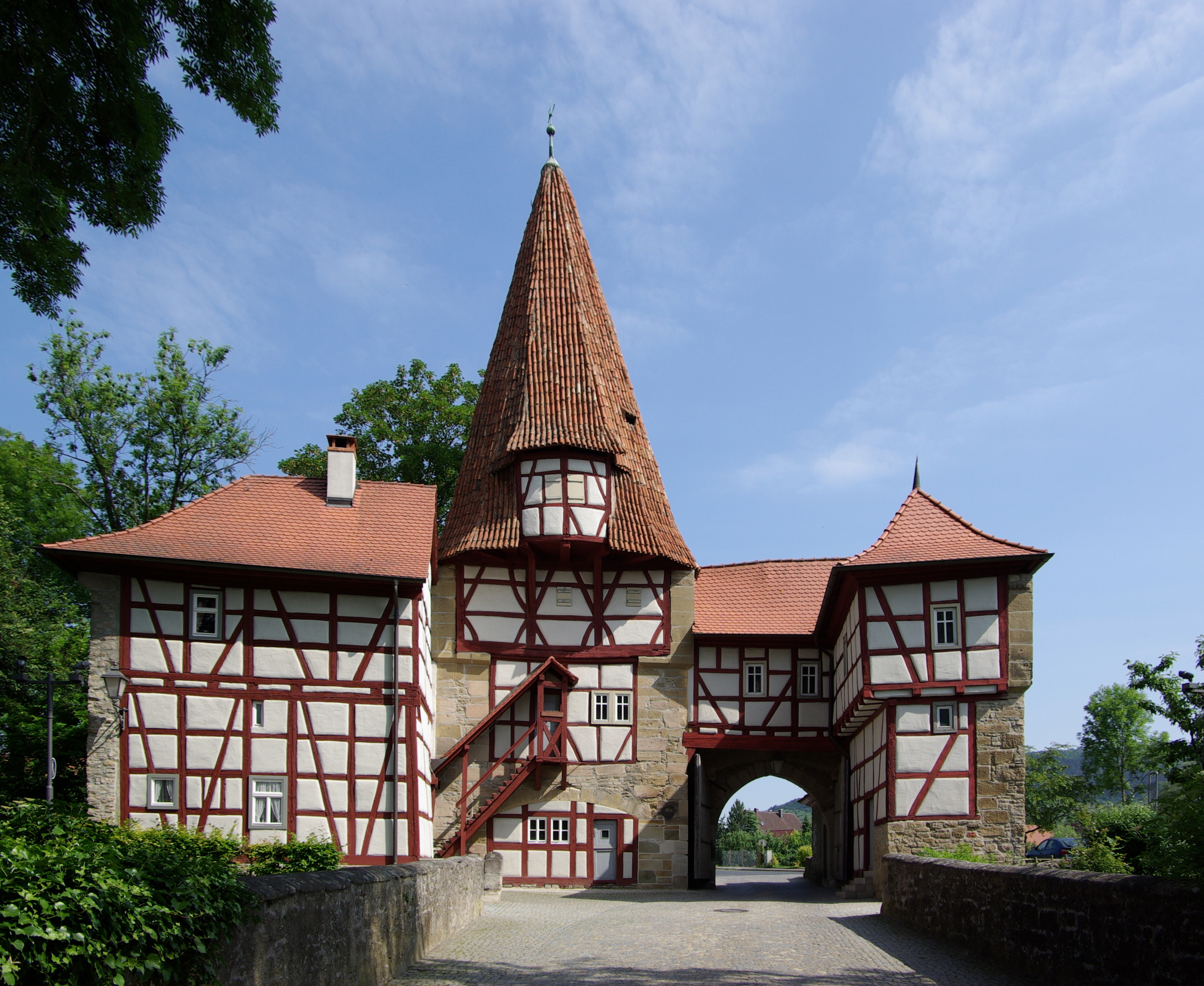
Rödelseer Tor

Iphofen lies in the southeast of the district of Kitzingen of Bavaria, in the Regierungsbezirk of Unterfranken. It is situated 9 km southeast of Kitzingen on Bundesstraße 8. The town is located about 10 km from the river Main. The nearest city is Würzburg. Iphofen lies at the foot of the Schwanberg, a prominent hill on the northwestern edge of the Mittelgebirge Steigerwald.

=== Subdivisions ===
Iphofen has six Stadtteile in addition to the town itself. These are Birklingen, Dornheim, Hellmitzheim, Mönchsondheim, Nenzenheim and Possenheim.

=== Neighbouring communities ===
Iphofen borders on (from the north, clockwise): Castell, Oberscheinfeld, Markt Bibart, Markt Einersheim, Sugenheim, Willanzheim, Mainbernheim, Rödelsee und Wiesenbronn.

== History ==
Iphofen was first mentioned as a property of the Diocese of Würzburg when it was established in 741/2. Among the 25 churches gifted to the bishop by Karlmann was the royal baptismal church Johannis baptistae at Iphofen. In addition, Würzburg received the tithes from the local royal estate.

In 1293, Iphofen was awarded the status of town. During the 14th and 15th century, Würzburg was able to purchase the rights of other nobles who held a strong position in Iphofen, notably Hohenlohe and the Counts of Castell. The latter held inter alia the patrozinium of St. Vitus, but in 1325/8 sold their properties in Iphofen to Ulrich von Hanau. He in turn sold them to the Bishop of Würzburg in 1331. The patrozinium over St. Vitus passed to the town of Iphofen in 1457. The first phase of construction of the town wall ended in 1349. Another area was incorporated in 1421.

In 1810, Iphofen permanently became a part of the Kingdom of Bavaria.

On 1 January 1972, six independent municipalities were merged with Iphofen. Until 1 July 1972, Iphofen was part of the now defunct Landkreis Scheinfeld.

== Economy ==
Iphofen has several local vineyards and is well known for its wine. Local industry includes the Knauf factory which manufactures gypsum boards.

== Attractions ==
The old town is characterized by the medieval/early modern town wall that completely surrounds it. The wall (14th/15th century) features seven towers and four gate houses: Rödelseer Tor (the symbol of Iphofen, 15th century), Mainbernheimer Tor (16th century), Einersheimer Tor and the Pesttor, walled off since 1596.

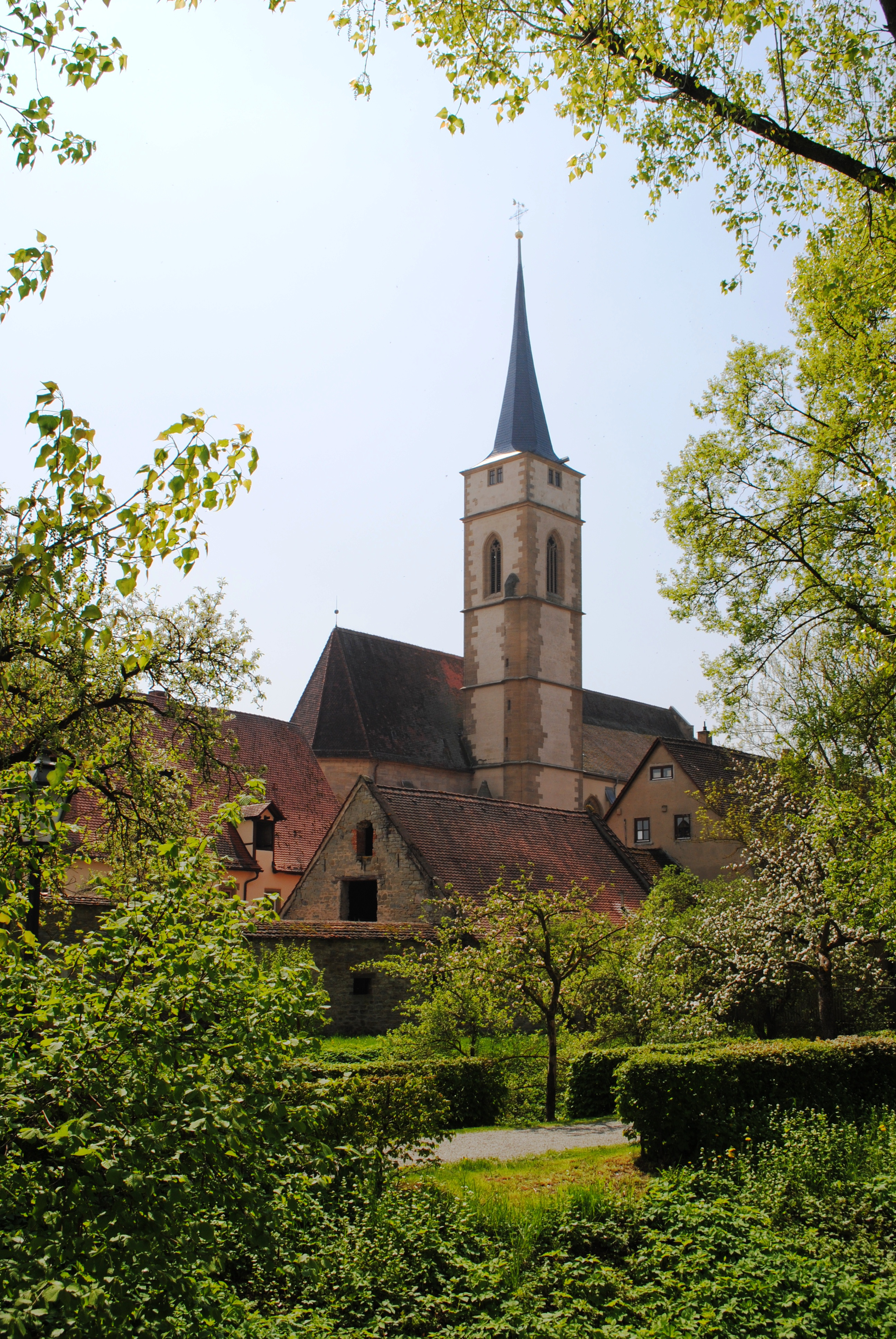
Catholic parish church St. Vitus

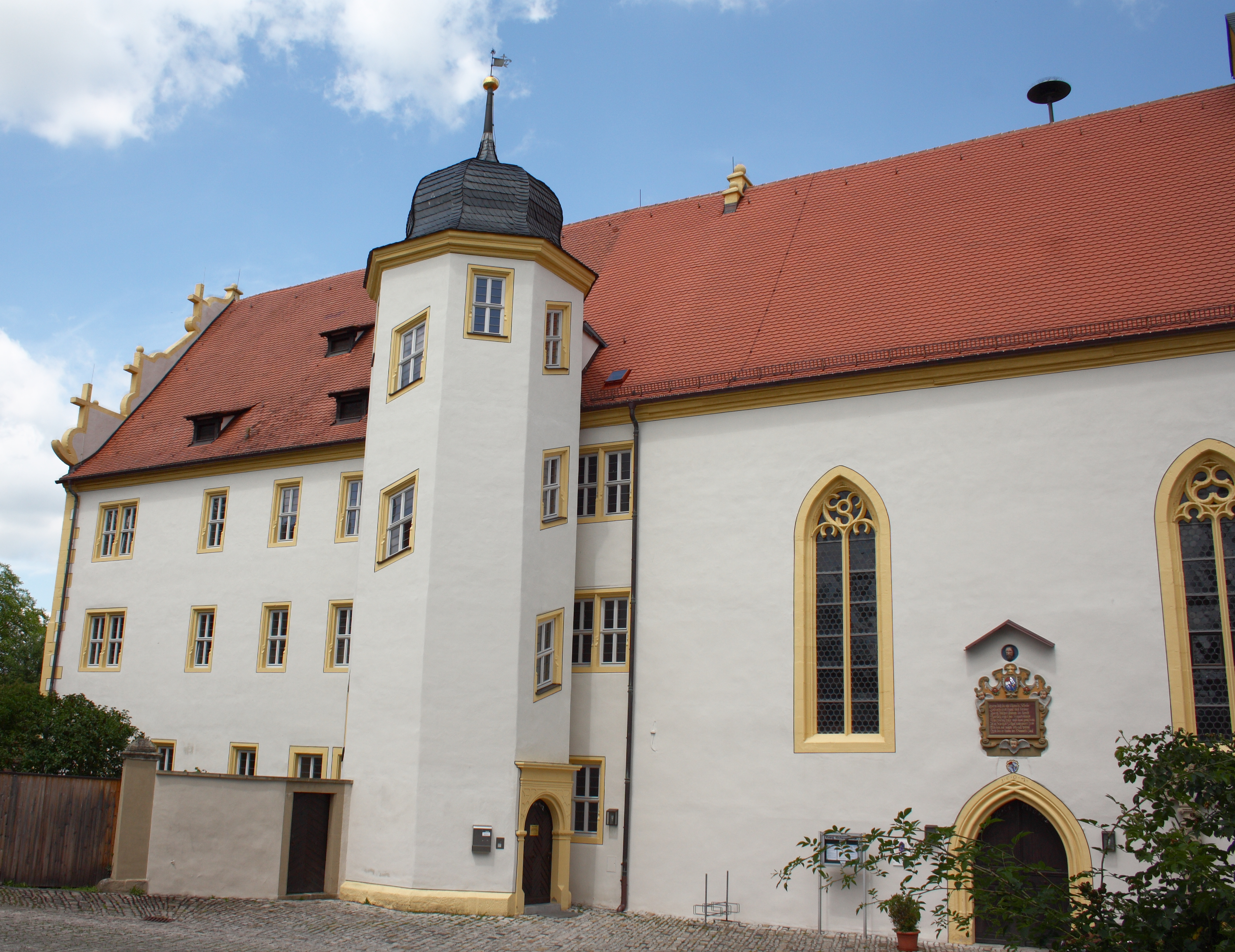
Spitalkirche St. Johannes der Täufer

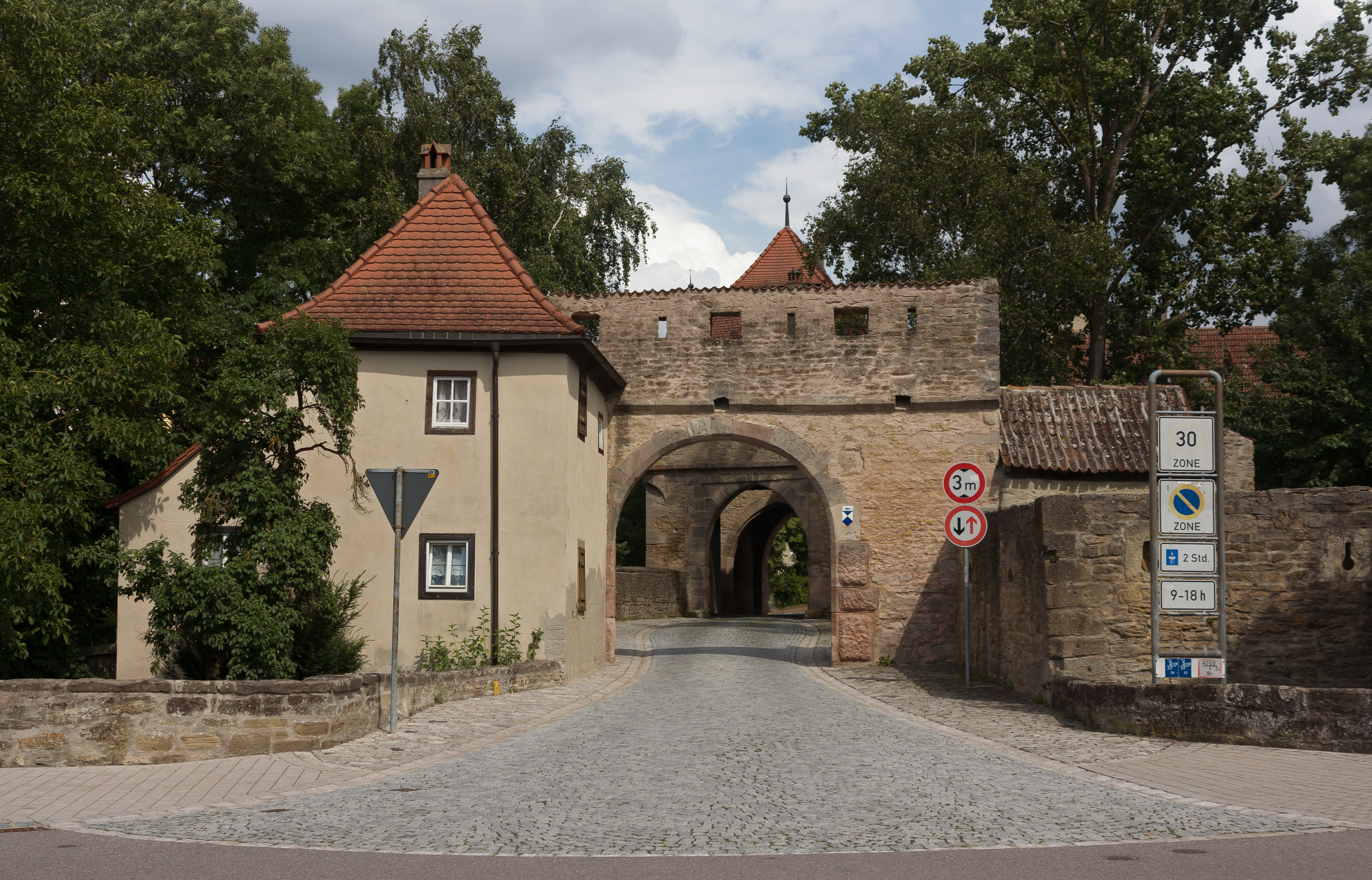
Towngate: Mainbernheimer Tor

Inside the wall, most buildings are historic and the tallest structures are the churches:

- St. Vitus – also known as St. Veit is located on the site of an earlier chapel to St. Vitus the current church was built from 1414-1612. As the town had only around 1,800 inhabitants, it struggled to finance the construction. The church combines features of the Gothic, Renaissance and early Baroque styles. It contains a Madonna sculpture carved from basswood, 15th century glass from the choir and a figure of St. John the Baptist by Tilman Riemenschneider, a Baroque altar and an organ from 1751 by Johann Philipp Seuffert.
- Spitalkirche St. Johannes der Täufer – also known as St. Johann Baptist (St John the Baptist), established in 1338 together with the Bürgerspital St. Johannis Baptistae, a hospital for the townspeople. Today, the interior is in Rococo style but also features Gothic sculptures attributed to Augustin Reuss, a local who had worked in Riemenschneider's workshop.
- Heilig Blut – likely originating in the late 13th century, the earliest documentary mention of the pilgrimage church Wallfahrtskirche zum Heiligen Blut dedicated to the Blood of Christ was in 1329.
- Michaelskapelle – this Gothic chapel is the oldest extant ecclesial building in Iphofen. When the graveyard was located at this site, it served as burial chapel. On the lower floor is the only ossuary remaining in Lower Franconia.

The Baroque town hall on the market square dates from 1716-8. It overlooks the square with many half-timbered houses and the Marienbrunnen (fountain with a Baroque statue of Mary).

The Zehntkeller (today a hotel) was the location of the Mönchshof, owned by the Augustinians at Birklingen. It was their refuge after the monastery was destroyed in the Peasants' War of 1525. The cellars then served to store the Zehntwein, i.e. the wine that was the tithe for the Bishop of Würzburg.

=== Museums ===
The Geschichtsscheune contains a large model of the town as well as housing sculptures from the 16th and 18th century.

The Knauf Museum, opened in 1983 in an early Baroque building (1688–93) which originally served as an inn, later as the local administrative seat (Amtshof) for the Prince-Bishop of Würzburg and then as the Bavarian Rentamt. The museum contains around 200 replicas of famous sculptures from ancient Egypt, Rome and Greece. Changing exhibitions are hosted in the modern annex.

The Kirchenburgmuseum in Mönchsondheim features exhibits on wine growing in Franconia, rural crafts, historic fortified churches (Kirchenburgen), such as the one at Mönchsondheim, and on life in Franconian villages.
