= Capul Church =

Roman Catholic church in Northern Samar, Philippines

- Saint Ignatius of Loyola Parish Church
- San Ignacio de Loyola Parish Church
- Simbahan ng Parokya ng San Ignacio ng Loyola (Filipino); Iglesia Parroquial de San Ignacio de Loyola (Spanish)
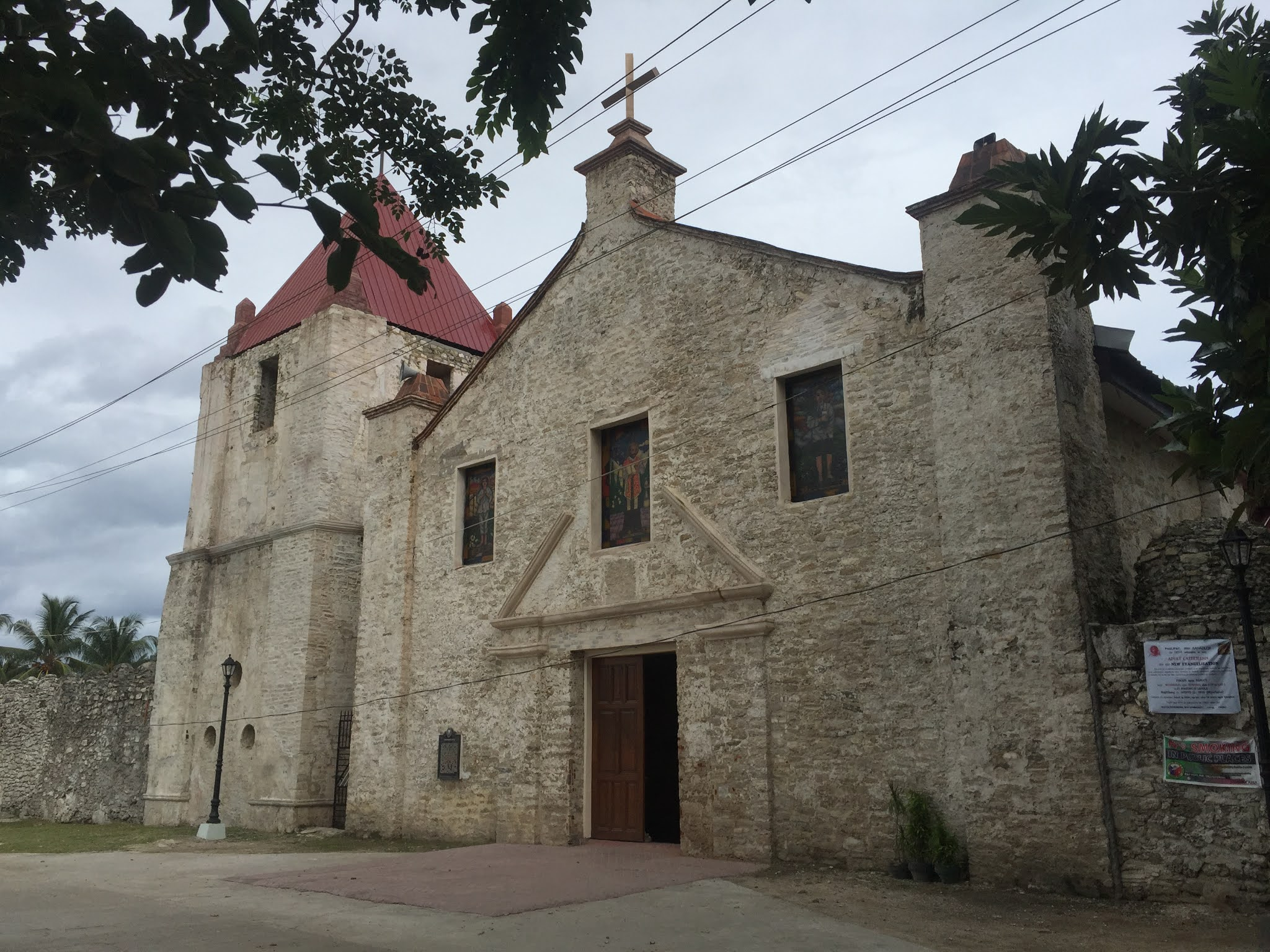
- Church facade in 2018

- Location in the Visayas Location in the Philippines
- 12°25′22″N 124°10′57″E
- Location: Capul, Northern Samar
- Country: Philippines
- Denomination: Roman Catholic

History
- Status: Parish church
- Founded: 1596
- Dedication: Saint Ignatius of Loyola

Architecture
- Functional status: Active
- Heritage designation: National Cultural Treasure
- Architect: Mariano Valero
- Architectural type: Church building
- Style: Fortress church
- Completed: 1781

Administration
- Archdiocese: Palo
- Diocese: Catarman

Clergy
- Archbishop: John F. Du
- Bishop: Emmanuel Trance

Saint Ignatius of Loyola Parish Church, commonly known as Capul Church or Fuerza de Capul, is a Roman Catholic fortress church in the municipality of Capul, Northern Samar, Philippines within the jurisdiction of the Diocese of Catarman. It was first established as a mission station by the Jesuits in 1596 under the advocacy of Saint Ignatius of Loyola.

The church was declared a National Cultural Treasure by the National Museum of the Philippines.

== History ==
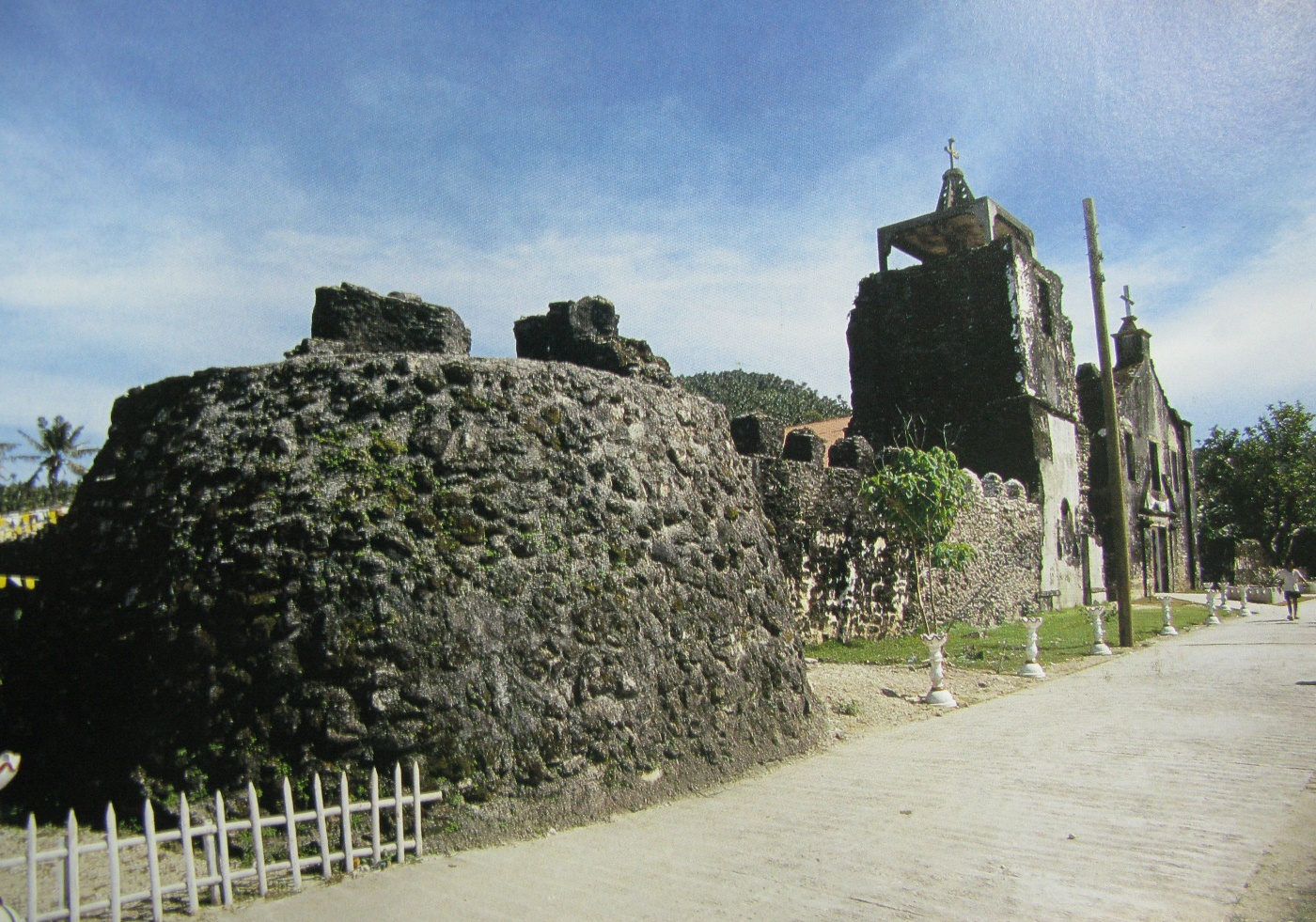
The church and its surrounding fortress

Capul was first established as a mission station by the Jesuits in 1596. (Note: According to Javellana, the Jesuits may have reached the island in 1610. The date 1596 comes from the marker of the National Historical Commission of the Philippines.) The first church made of nipa and hardwood was dedicated to Saint Ignatius of Loyola. Moro attacks from the Pacific Ocean destroyed the church. A new church made of stone, along with a fortress, was built to protect the town from Moro invasion in the 1600s. Father Juan Isandi, (Note: Also spelled as Esandi.) last Jesuit priest to Capul, died during the Moro attacks in 1768. After the Jesuits were expelled in the country, the Franciscans later supervised Capul in 1768 with Father Joaquín Martínez as the first Franciscan priest there. The church was again destroyed by the Moro and Father Mariano Valera supervised the reconstruction of the third church and construction of the 11 metres (36 ft) high bell tower in 1781. On November 8, 1864, Capul was elevated as a parish by the Bishop of Cebu. (Note: The marker of the National Historical Commission of the Philippines states that Capul was elevated as a parish on November 8, 1864. Javellana states that Capul was elevated as a parish on November 18, 1869, in conformity of an episcopal decree dated September 12, 1864)

== Architecture ==
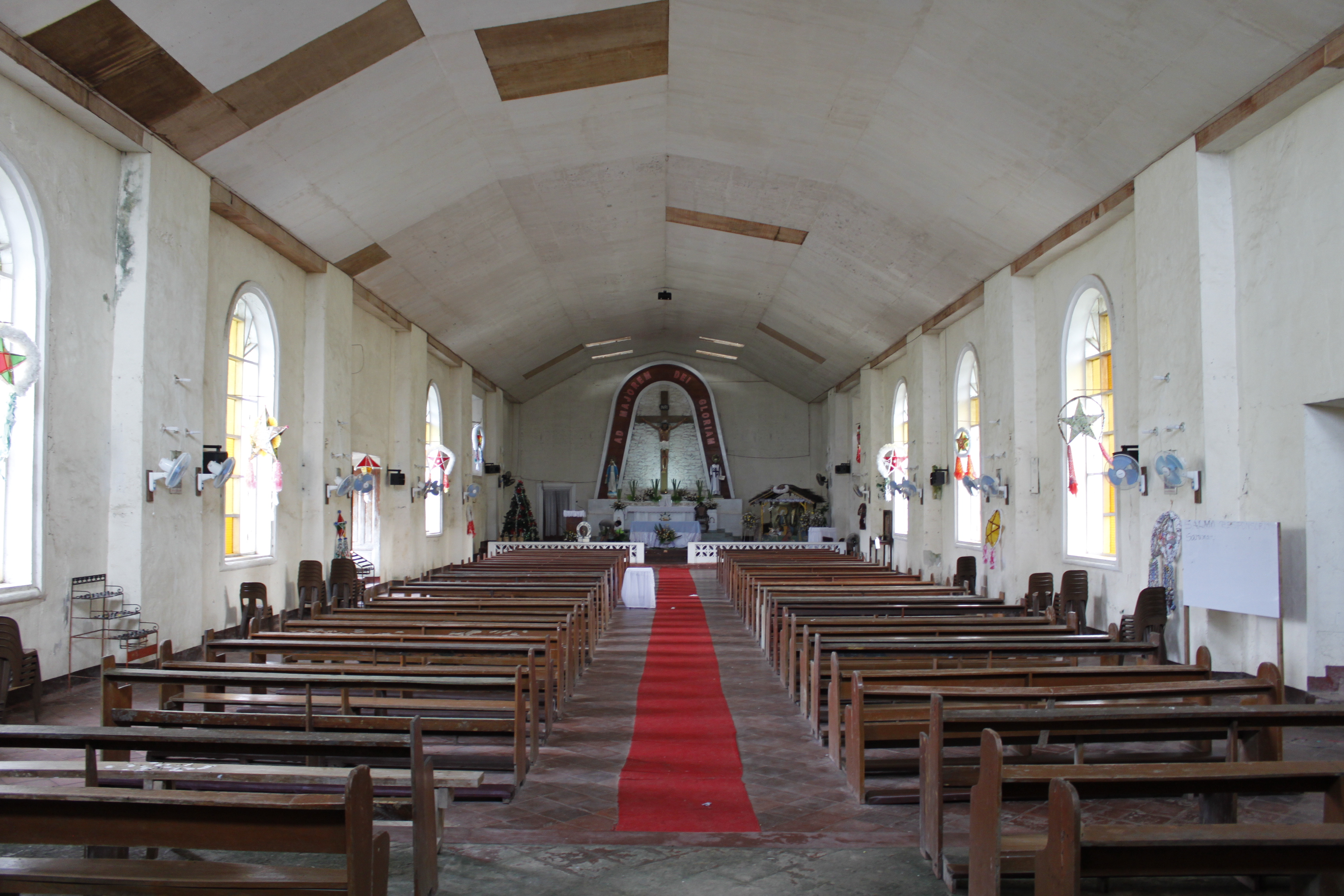
Church interior in 2012

The church is an example of a Spanish fortress church. It is surrounded by strong stone walls and bastions of dissimilar designs. Father Valero designed the church with a cross-shaped wall made of stone, similar to Intramuros. When Moros attacked the town, the people of Capul would take refuge inside the church. The bell tower is located on the left side of the church. A stone watchtower on a huge rock is located near the church complex. A small chapel, probably a mortuary chapel, can also be found inside the complex.

Its facade is simple as it forms a defensive wall. Pilasters and a split pediment around the central door only adorn the facade.

A typhoon destroyed the church's neo-gothic altar in 1947 and in 1987, another typhoon caused extensive damage when it ripped off the roof and ceiling. The church was afterwards repaired but is virtually an empty shell. The storm also destroyed the church's convent.

== Historical and cultural declarations ==
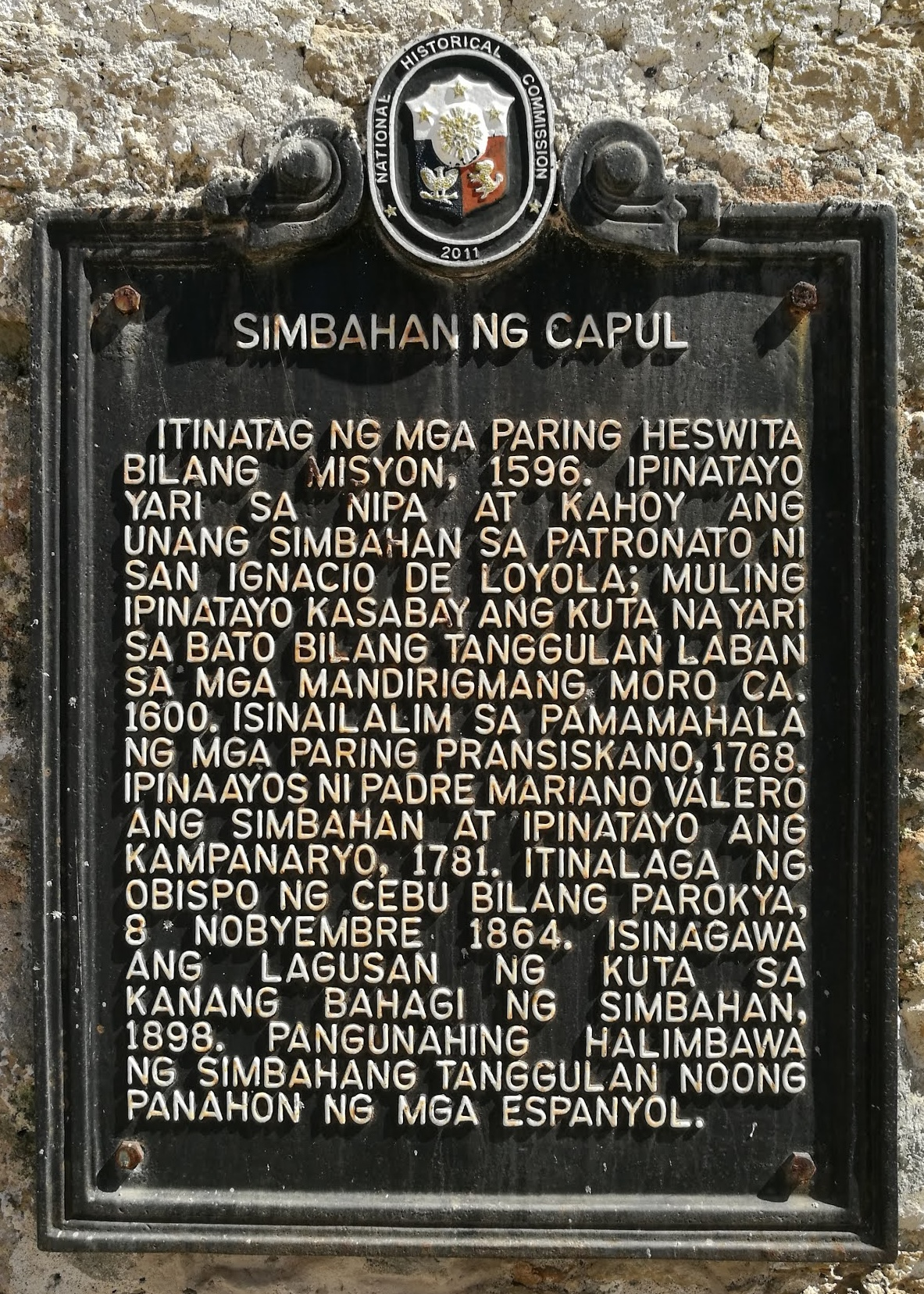
Church NHC historical marker installed in 2011

A historical marker was installed on Capul Church on August 5, 2011. It was also declared a National Cultural Treasure by the National Museum of the Philippines in 2014.
