= Iphofen (Verwaltungsgemeinschaft) =

- Verwaltungsgemeinschaft
- Location of Iphofen within Kitzingen district
- Interactive map of Iphofen
- Location within Germany Location within Bavaria
- Coordinates: 49°42′N 10°16′E
- Country: Germany
- State: Bavaria
- Admin. region: Lower Franconia
- District: Kitzingen
- Seat: Iphofen
- Subdivisions: 4 municipalities

Area
  - Total: 122.46 km^{2} (47.28 sq mi)

Population (2025-12-31)
  - Total: 9,654
  - Density: 78.83/km^{2} (204.2/sq mi)
- Time zone: UTC+01:00 (CET)
  - Summer (DST): UTC+02:00 (CEST)
- Website: vgem-iphofen.de

Iphofen is a Verwaltungsgemeinschaft (municipal association) in the district of Kitzingen in Bavaria, Germany. Its seat is in Iphofen.

It consists of the following municipalities:

1. Iphofen
2. Markt Einersheim
3. Rödelsee
4. Willanzheim
