= Autreppes =

- Commune
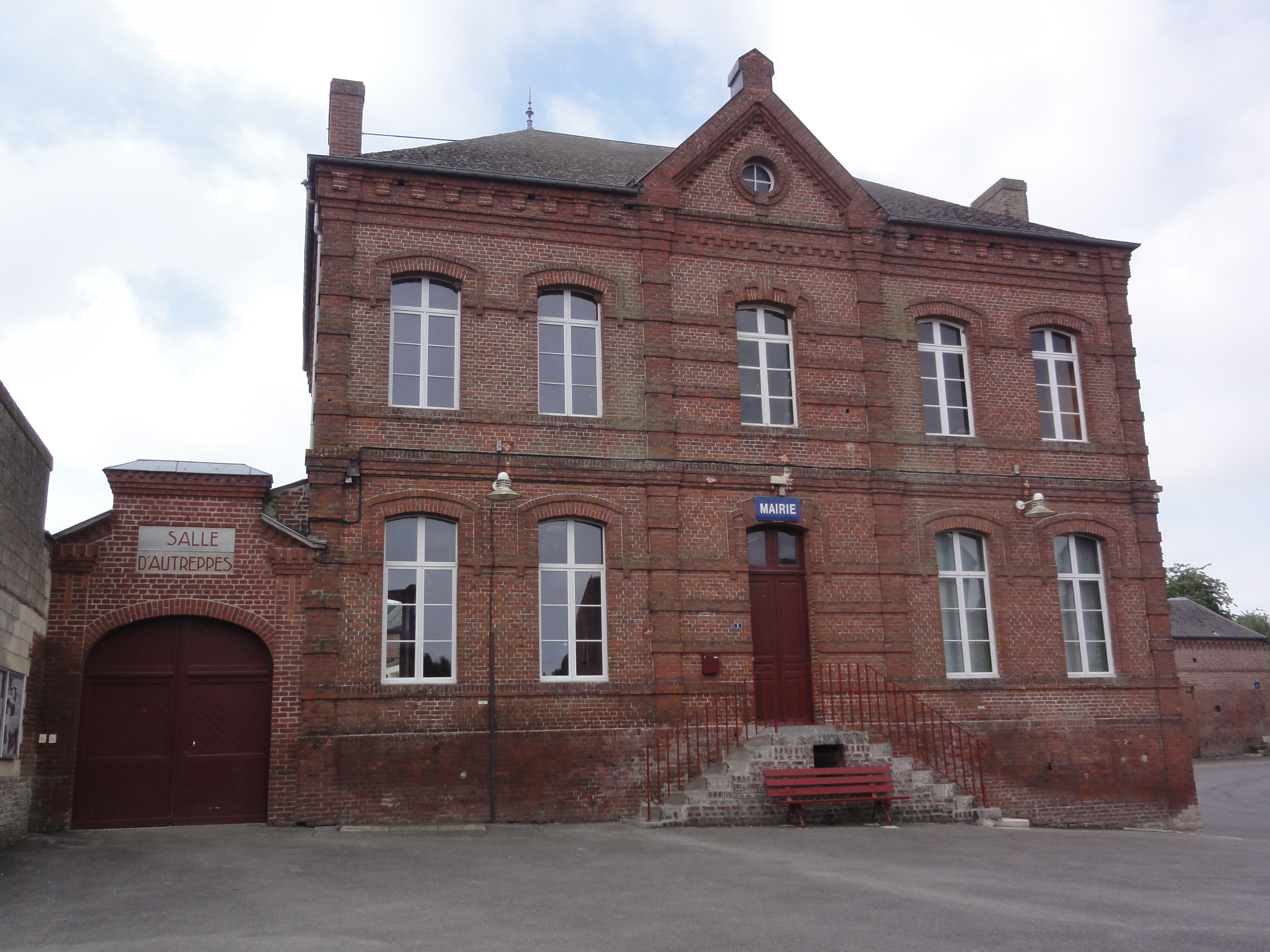
- Town hall
- Location of Autreppes
- Location within France Location within Hauts-de-France
- Coordinates: 49°54′15″N 3°51′24″E
- Country: France
- Region: Hauts-de-France
- Department: Aisne
- Arrondissement: Vervins
- Canton: Vervins
- Intercommunality: Thiérache du Centre

Government
  - Mayor (2026–32): Bruno Compain
- Area^{1}: 6.78 km^{2} (2.62 sq mi)
- Elevation: 121 m (397 ft)
- Highest elevation: 201 m (659 ft)
- Lowest elevation: 117 m (384 ft)
- Population (2023): 175
  - Density: 25.8/km^{2} (66.9/sq mi)
- Time zone: UTC+01:00 (CET)
  - Summer (DST): UTC+02:00 (CEST)
- INSEE/Postal code: 02040 /02580
- ^{1} French Land Register data, which excludes lakes, ponds, glaciers > 1 km^{2} (0.386 sq mi or 247 acres) and river estuaries.

Autreppes (French pronunciation: [otʁɛp]) is a commune in the department of Aisne in the Hauts-de-France region of northern France and in the natural region of Thiérache.

== Geography ==
Autreppes is located some 35 km east by northeast of Saint-Quentin and 15 km west of Hirson. It can be accessed by the D31 road running from Saint-Algis in the west through the heart of the commune and the village and continuing east to Etreaupont. There are also many country roads covering the commune and accessing it from all directions. The commune consists entirely of farmland.

The Oise river traverses the northern part of the commune from east to west. Only one stream flows into it from the north in the commune.

== History ==
The area was called Altripia in 876. Autreppes was part of the former royal estate given to the Abbey of Saint-Denis in 915. Then the village of Autreppes became a lordship until the French Revolution. In 1790 the commune was part of the Canton of Marly in the district of Vervins but in 1801 became part of the Canton of Vervins in the Arrondissement of Vervins.

== Population ==
Historical population
Year	Pop.	±% p.a.
1968	232	—
1975	216	−1.02%
1982	184	−2.26%
1990	150	−2.52%
1999	142	−0.61%
2007	180	+3.01%
2012	180	+0.00%
2017	178	−0.22%
2023	175	−0.28%
Source: INSEE

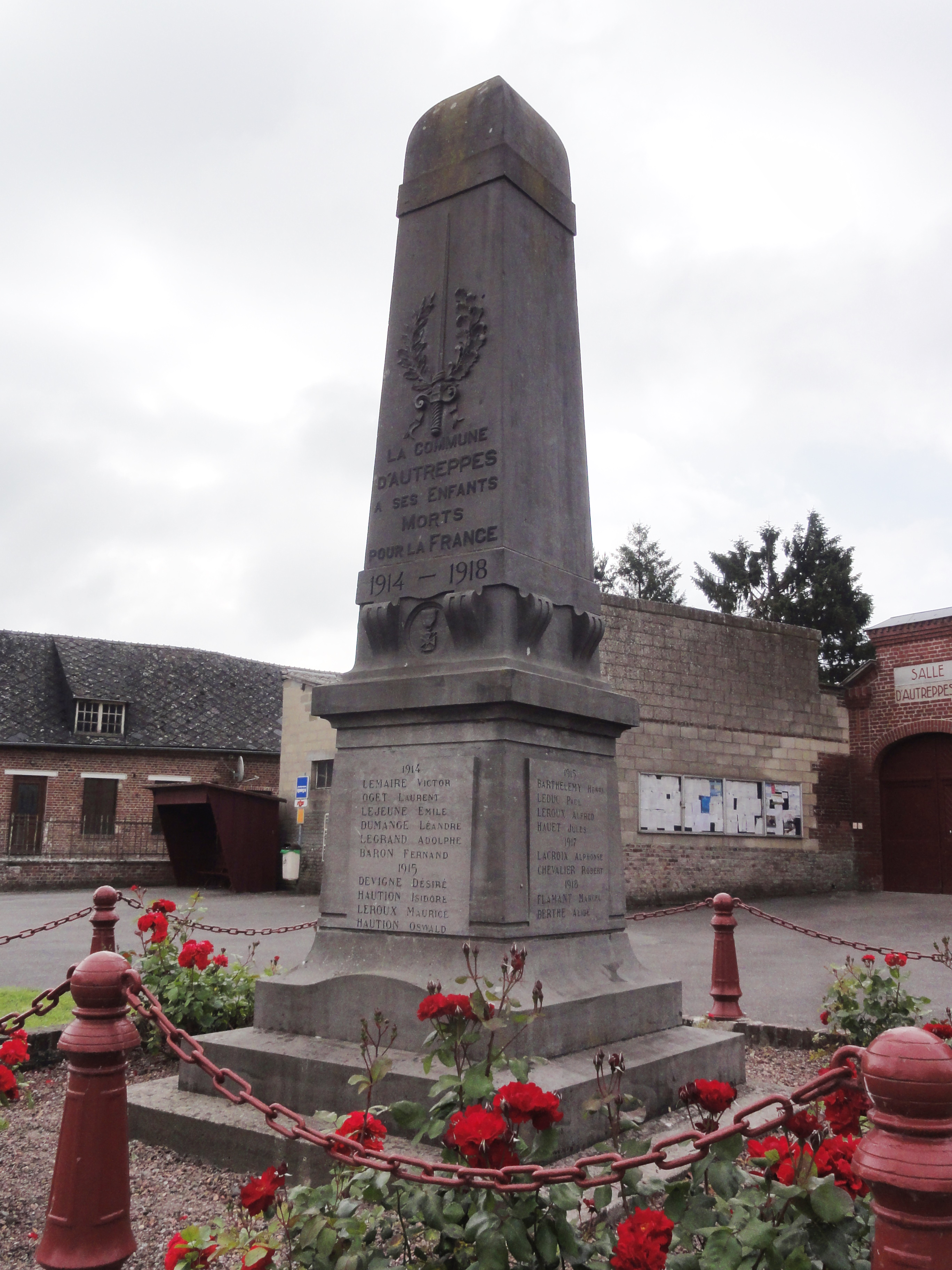
The War memorial

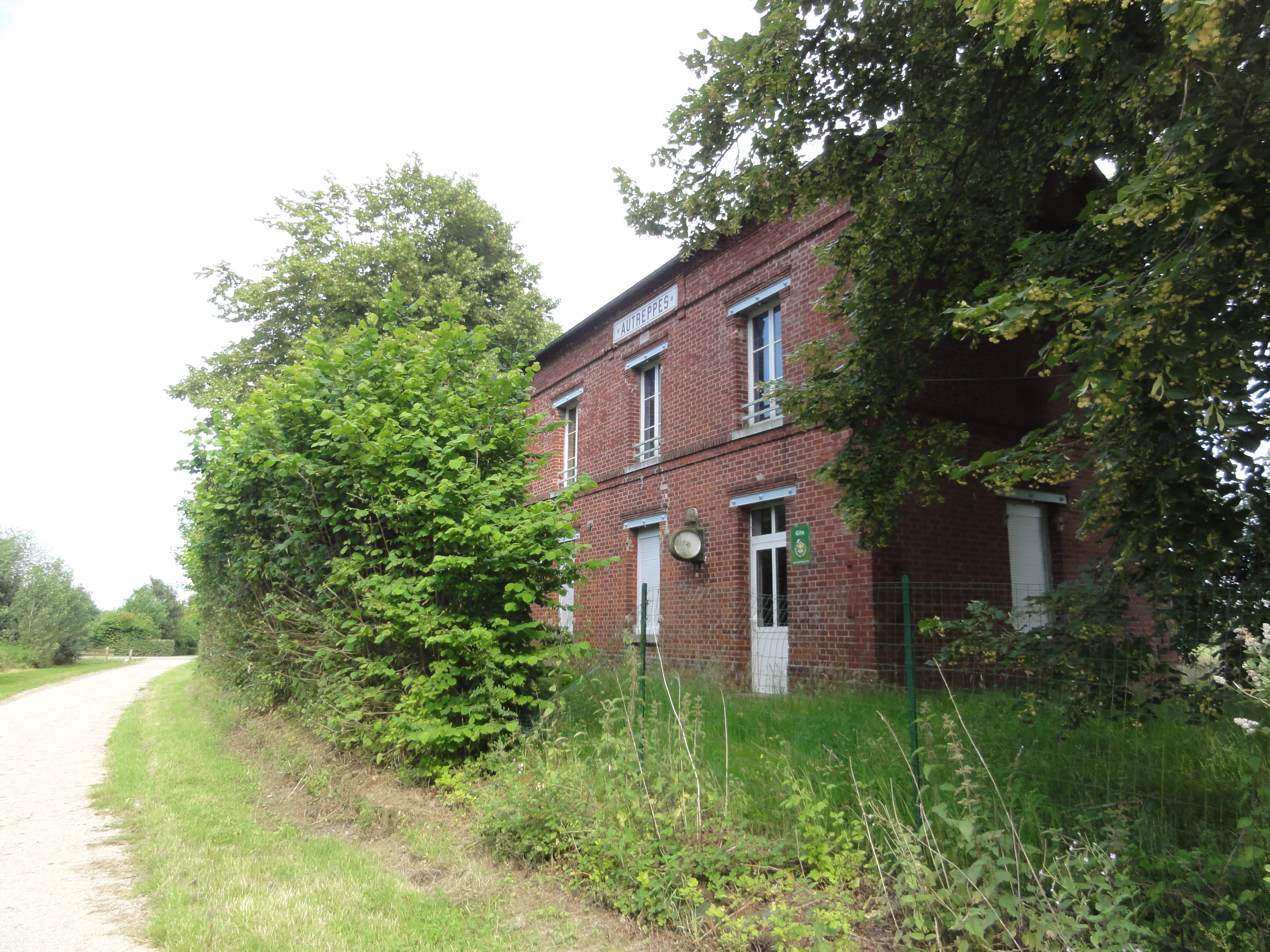
The old Railway Station

== Culture and heritage ==
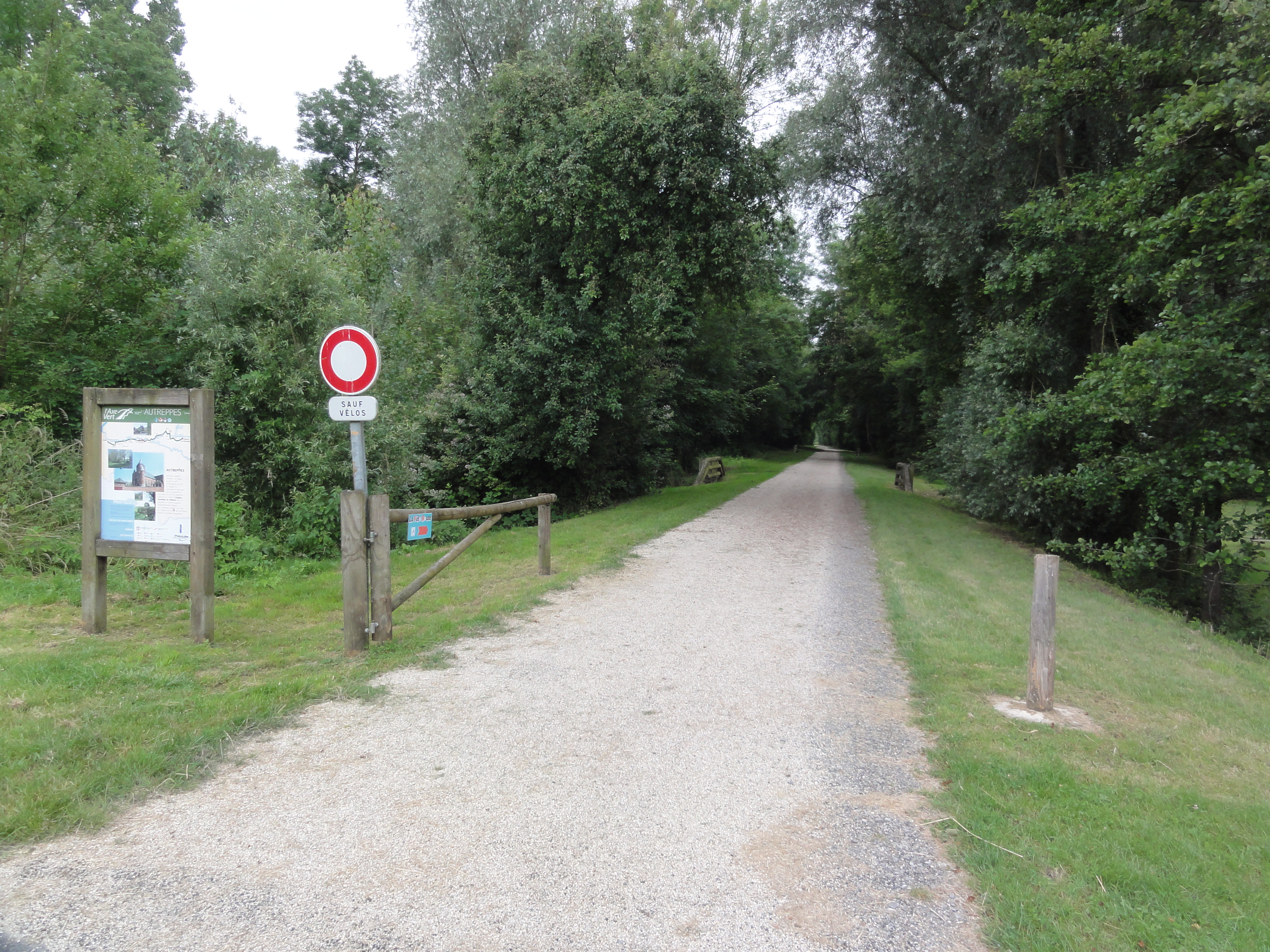
The Axe Vert

=== Civil heritage ===
The commune has a number of buildings and structures that are registered as historical monuments:

- A Schoolteacher's House at 10 Rue Bernard-Lefèvre (1823)
- A Railway Station at Rue du Gîte (1909)
- A Spinning Mill at 13 Rue Jean-Pierre-Lefèvre (1850)
- A House at 4 Rue Jean-Pierre-Lefèvre (1804)
- The Town Hall / School at Place de la Mairie (1879)
- A Farmhouse at 24 Rue de Vervins (1865)

Other sites of interest

- The Axe Vert (Green Axis) is a hiking trail built on the old Guise-Hirson railway trackbed which forms part of the GR 122 walking trail.

=== Religious heritage ===
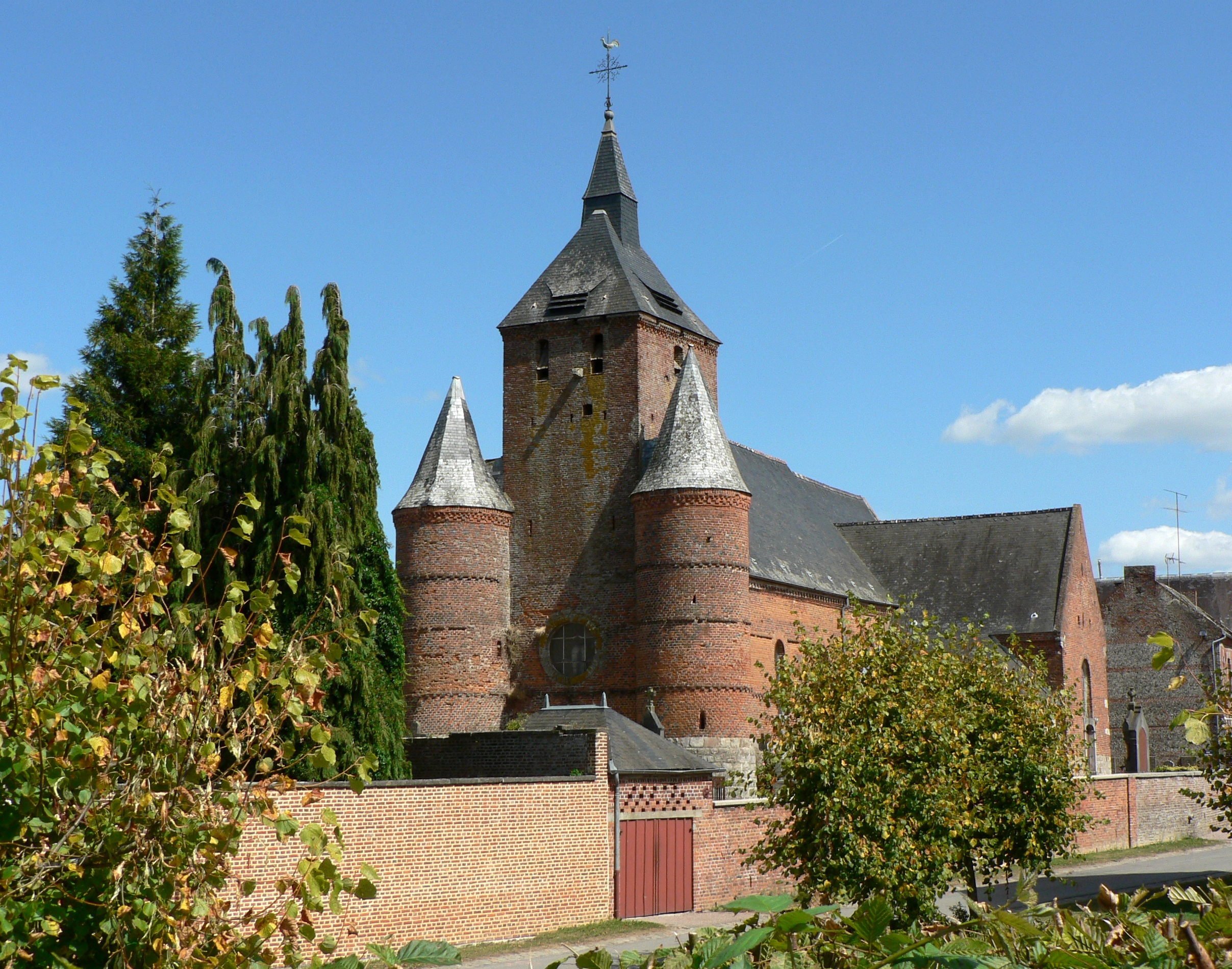
The Saint-Hilaire fortified church

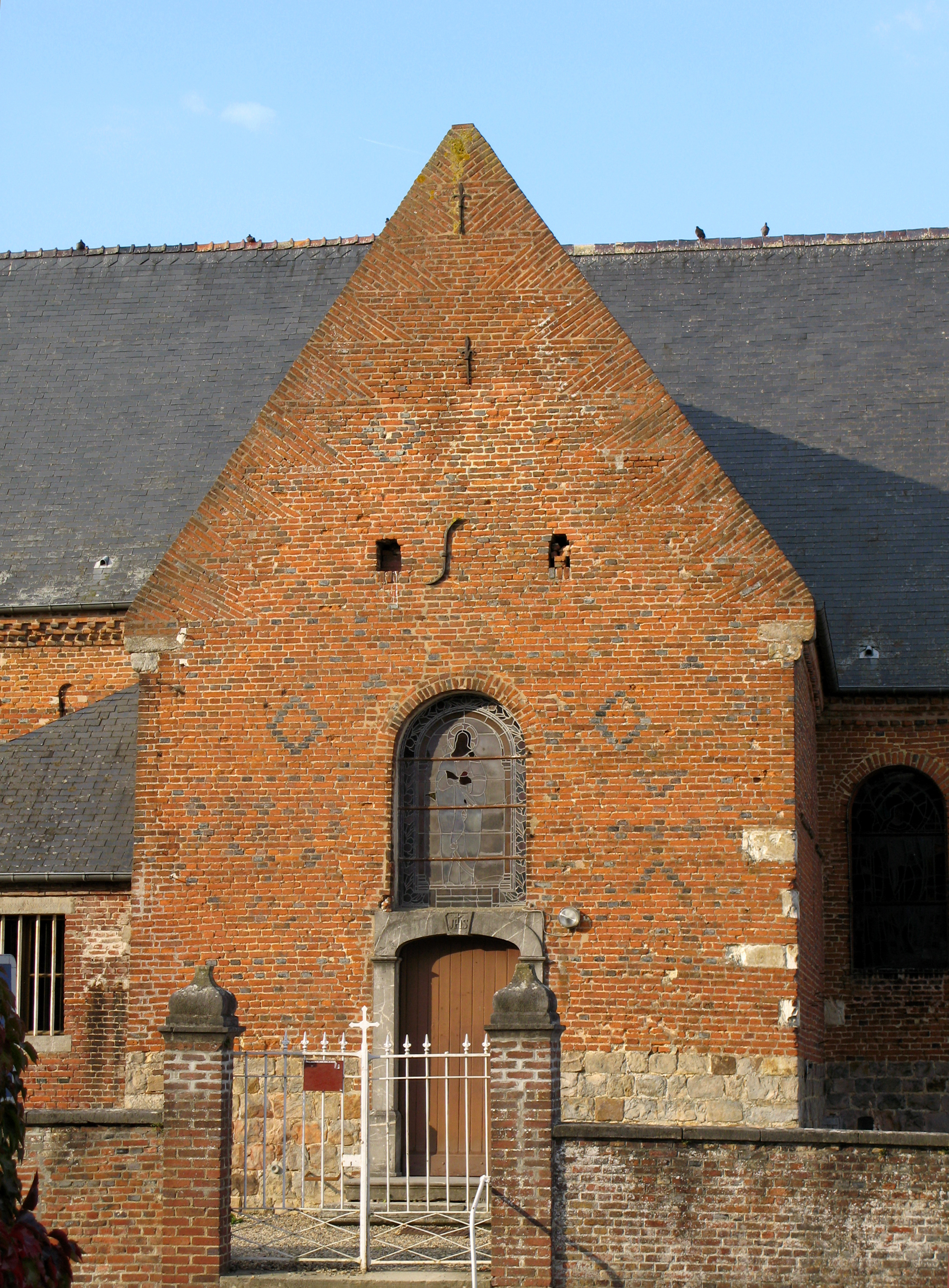
The fortified church south transept

The commune has two religious buildings that are registered as historical monuments:

- A former Presbytery (1778)
- The Parish Church of Saint-Hilaire (1632) The Church contains many items that are registered as historical objects:
  - A Rock Frame (18th century)
  - A Chasuble, Stole, Maniple, and a Chalice cover (19th century)
  - An Altar Painting: Assumption (16th century)
  - A Painting: Presentation of the Virgin in the Temple (17th century)
  - A Reliquary Cross of Saint Hilaire of Poitiers (1758)
  - A Cross: Christ on the Cross (18th century)
  - A Confessional Door (18th century)
  - A Statue: Virgin and child called Our Lady of Victories (19th century)
  - A Funeral Cross for François Demarle (1814)
  - A Tabernacle (17th century)
  - A set of 2 Consoles (18th century)
  - A set of 6 Stained glass windows of people (1961)
  - A Stained glass window: Saint Augustin (Bay 7) (19th century)
  - A set of 4 Pews (18th century)

The Church Picture Gallery

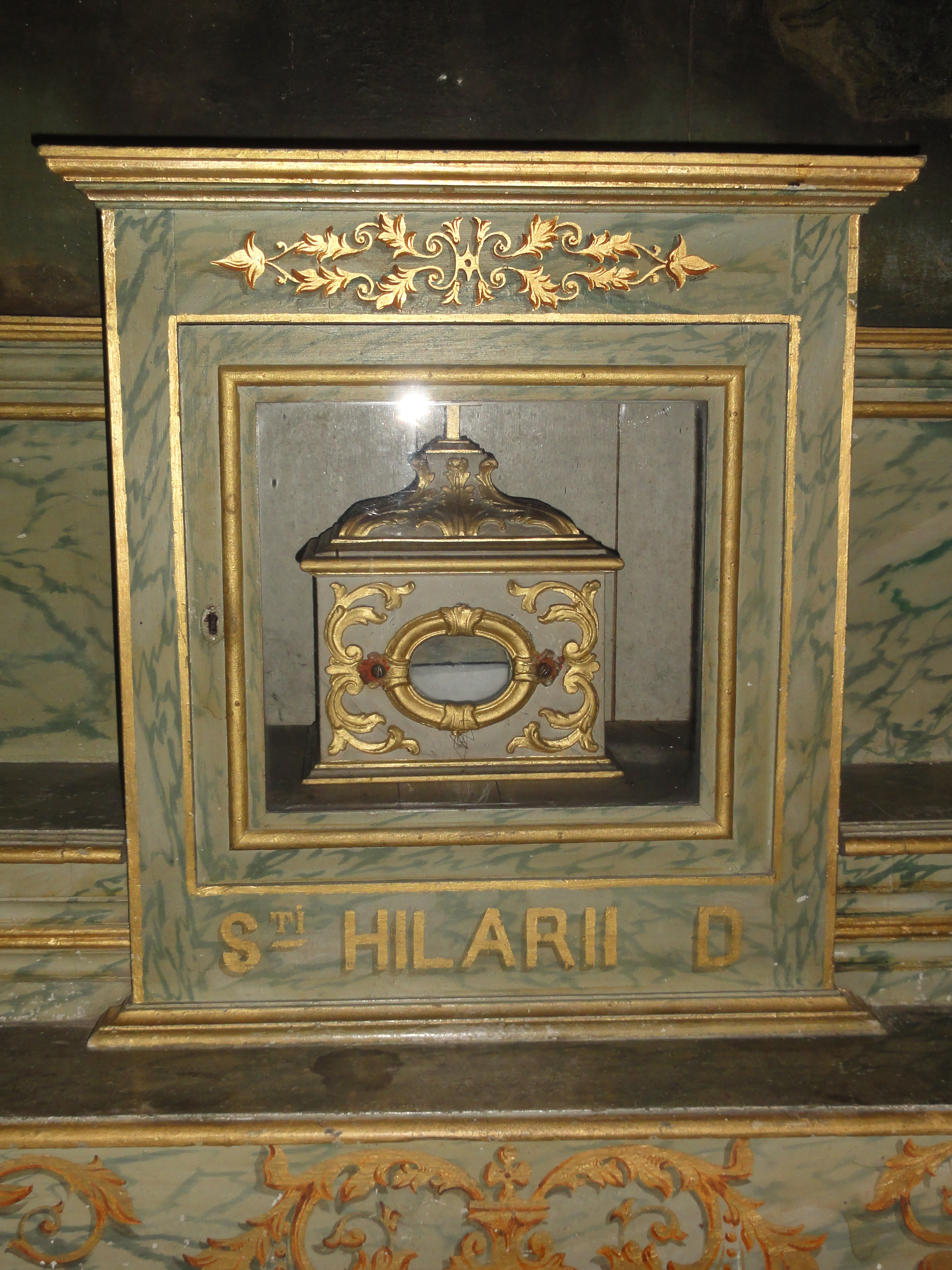
Reliquary

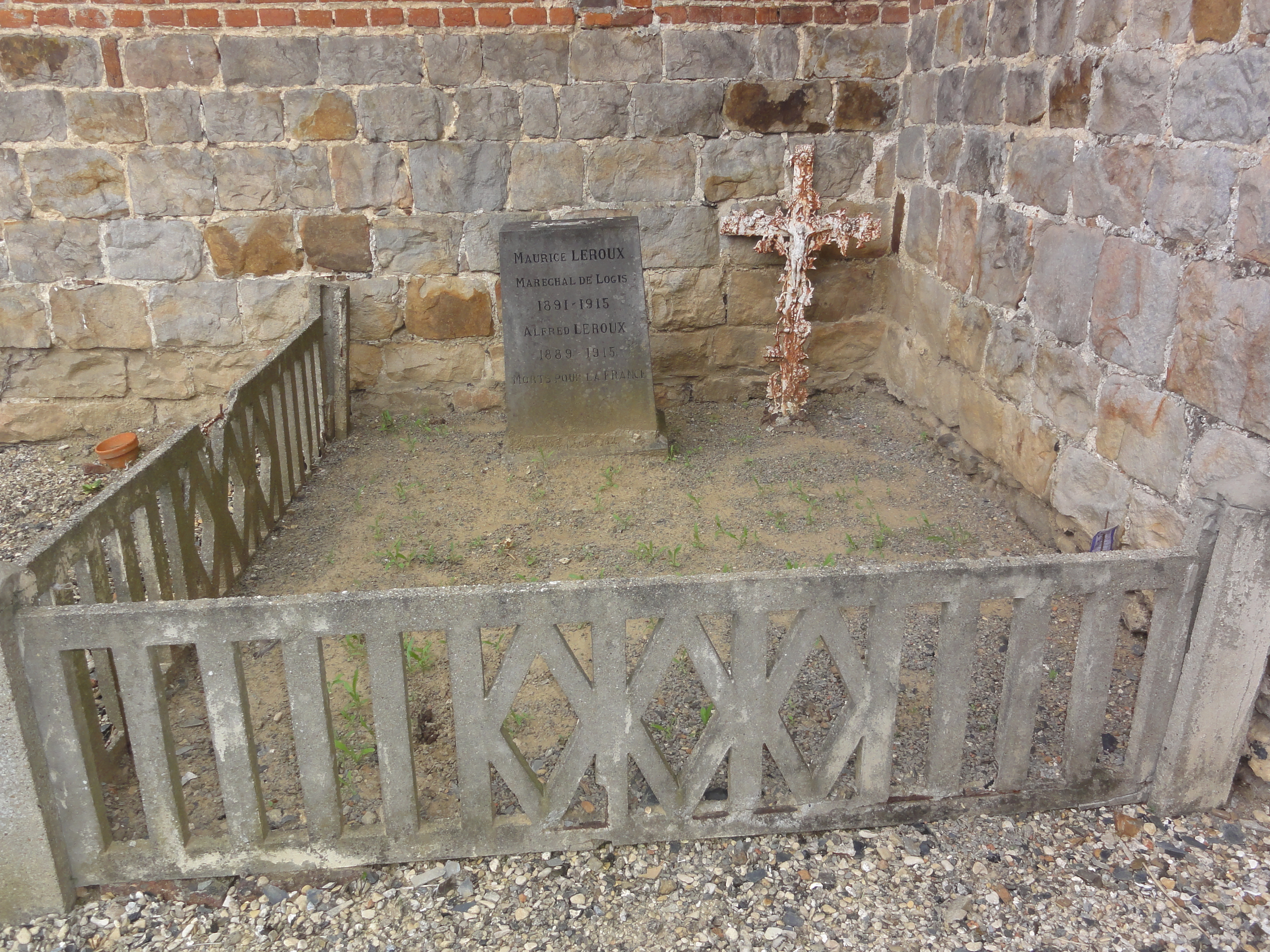
War tomb

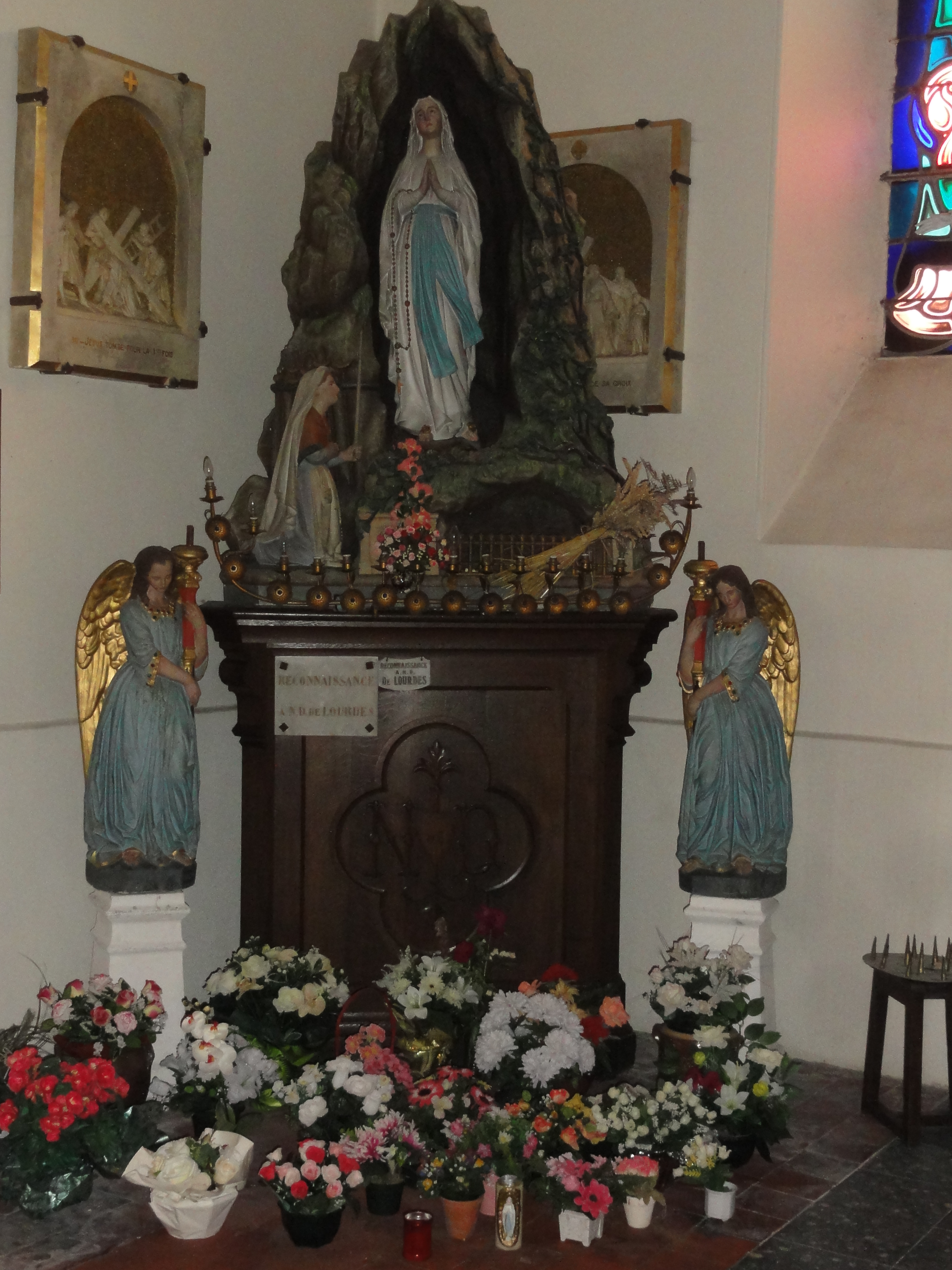
The Grotto of Lourdes

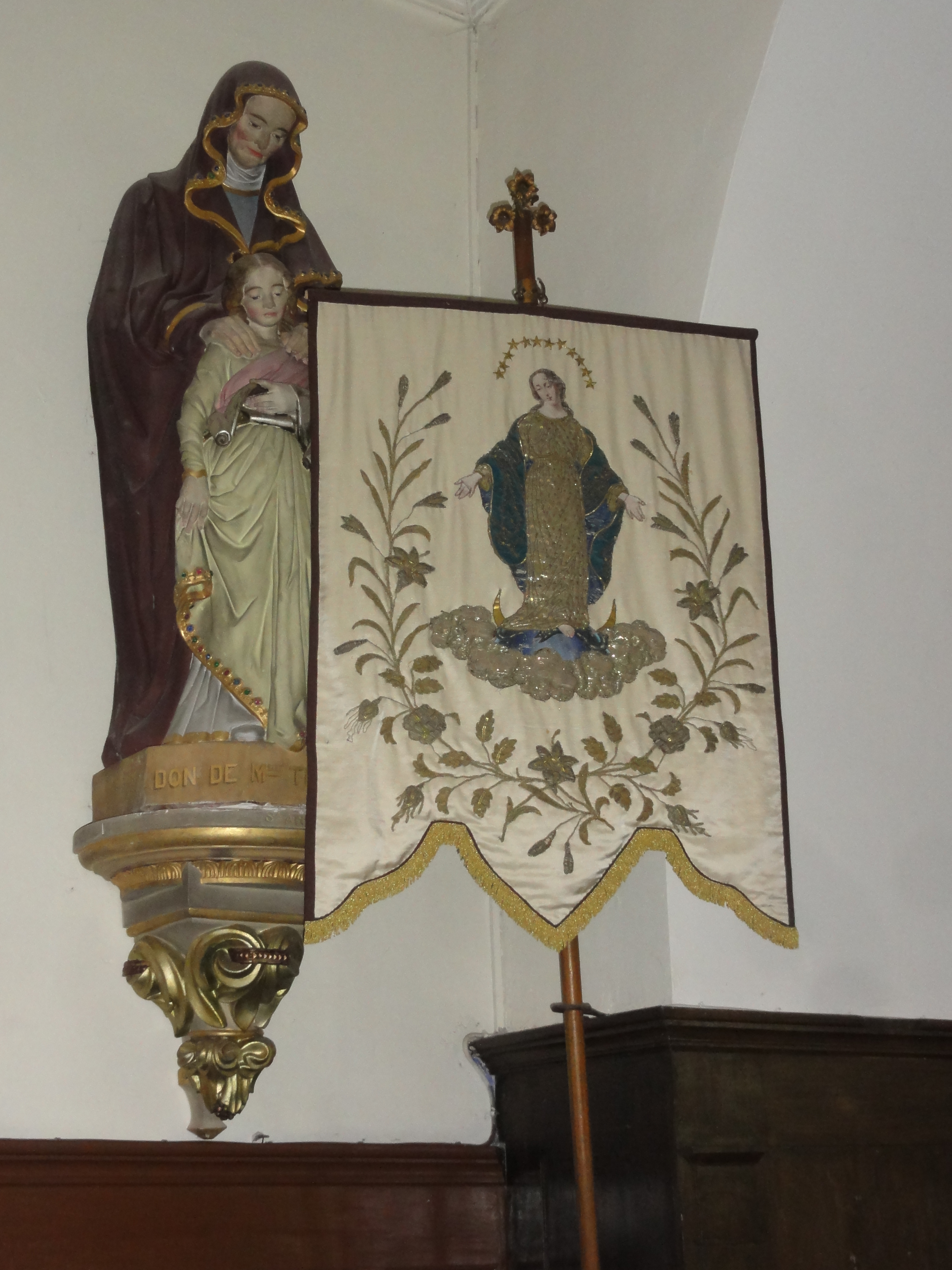
A Processional Banner

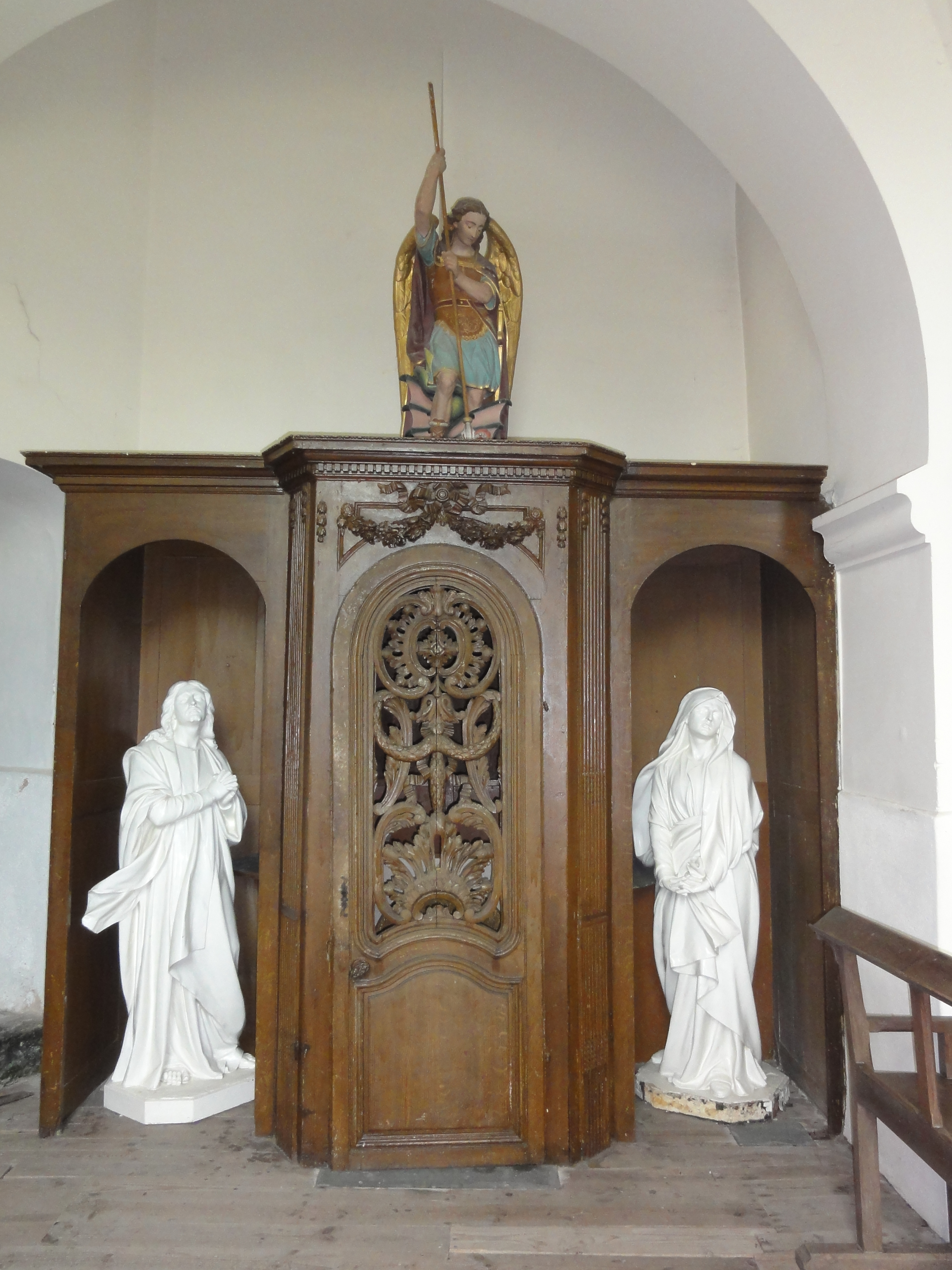
The Confessional

Other religious sites of interest

- An oratory

== Notable people linked to the commune ==
- Bernard and Jean-Pierre Lefèvre - two young people killed during the war in Algeria. The two main streets of the commune are named after them.

== See also ==
- Communes of the Aisne department
