= Markt Einersheim =

- Municipality
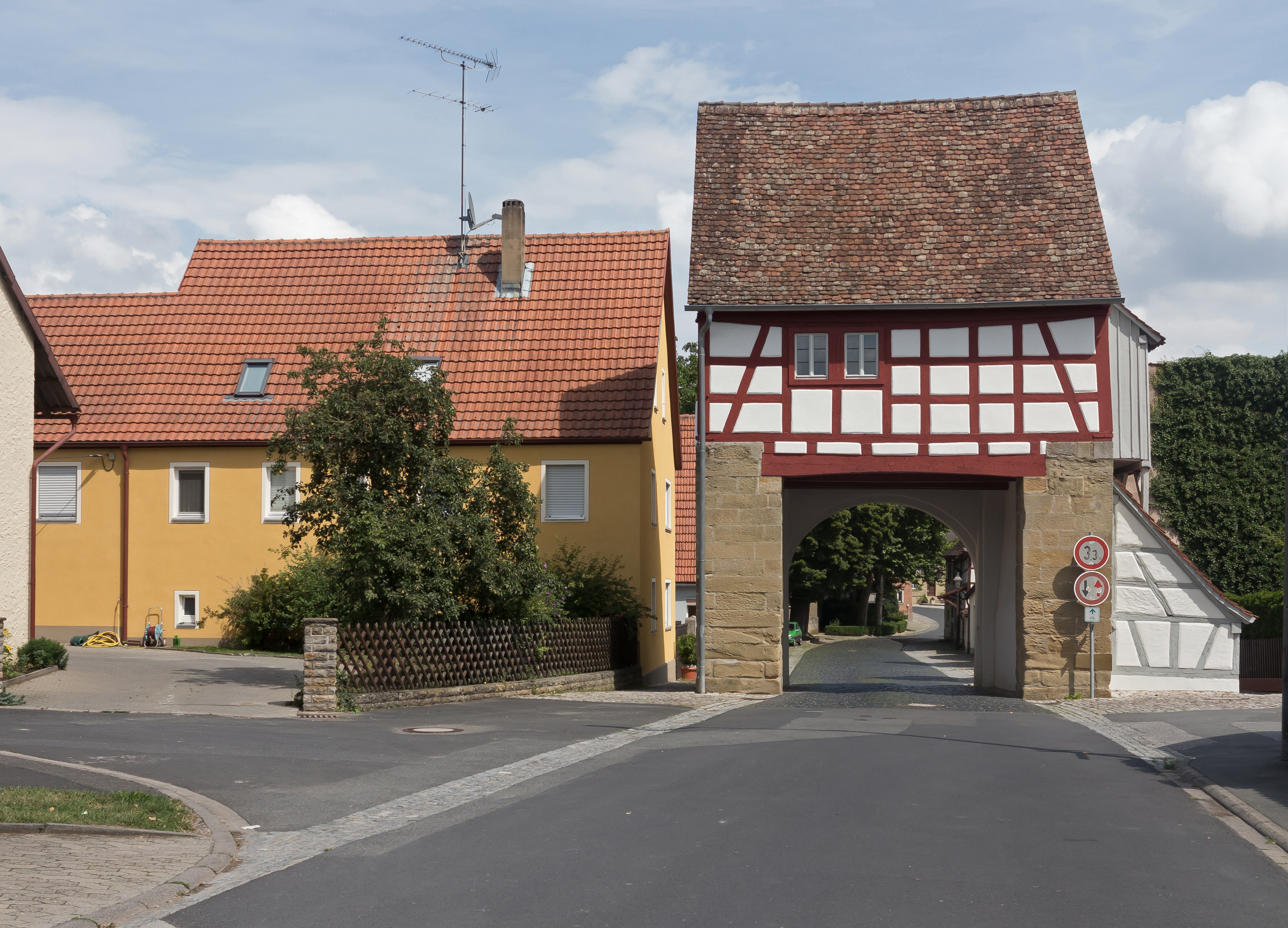
- Würzbürg Gate

- Coat of arms

- Location of Markt Einersheim within Kitzingen district
- Interactive map of Markt Einersheim
- Location within Germany Location within Bavaria
- Coordinates: 49°41′N 10°18′E
- Country: Germany
- State: Bavaria
- Admin. region: Lower Franconia
- District: Kitzingen
- Municipal assoc.: Iphofen

Government
  - Mayor (2020–26): Herbert Volkamer

Area
  - Total: 7.74 km^{2} (2.99 sq mi)
- Elevation: 290 m (950 ft)

Population (2025-12-31)
  - Total: 1,221
  - Density: 158/km^{2} (409/sq mi)
- Time zone: UTC+01:00 (CET)
  - Summer (DST): UTC+02:00 (CEST)
- Postal codes: 97348
- Dialling codes: 09326
- Vehicle registration: KT
- Website: www.markt-einersheim.de

Markt Einersheim is a market town and municipality in the district of Kitzingen in Bavaria, Germany. On April 5, 1945, at the end of World War II, the town was bombed by United States Army Air Forces P-47 Thunderbolts. American troops captured the town from German forces, who retreated to the southeast, on April 6.
