= Willanzheim =

- Municipality
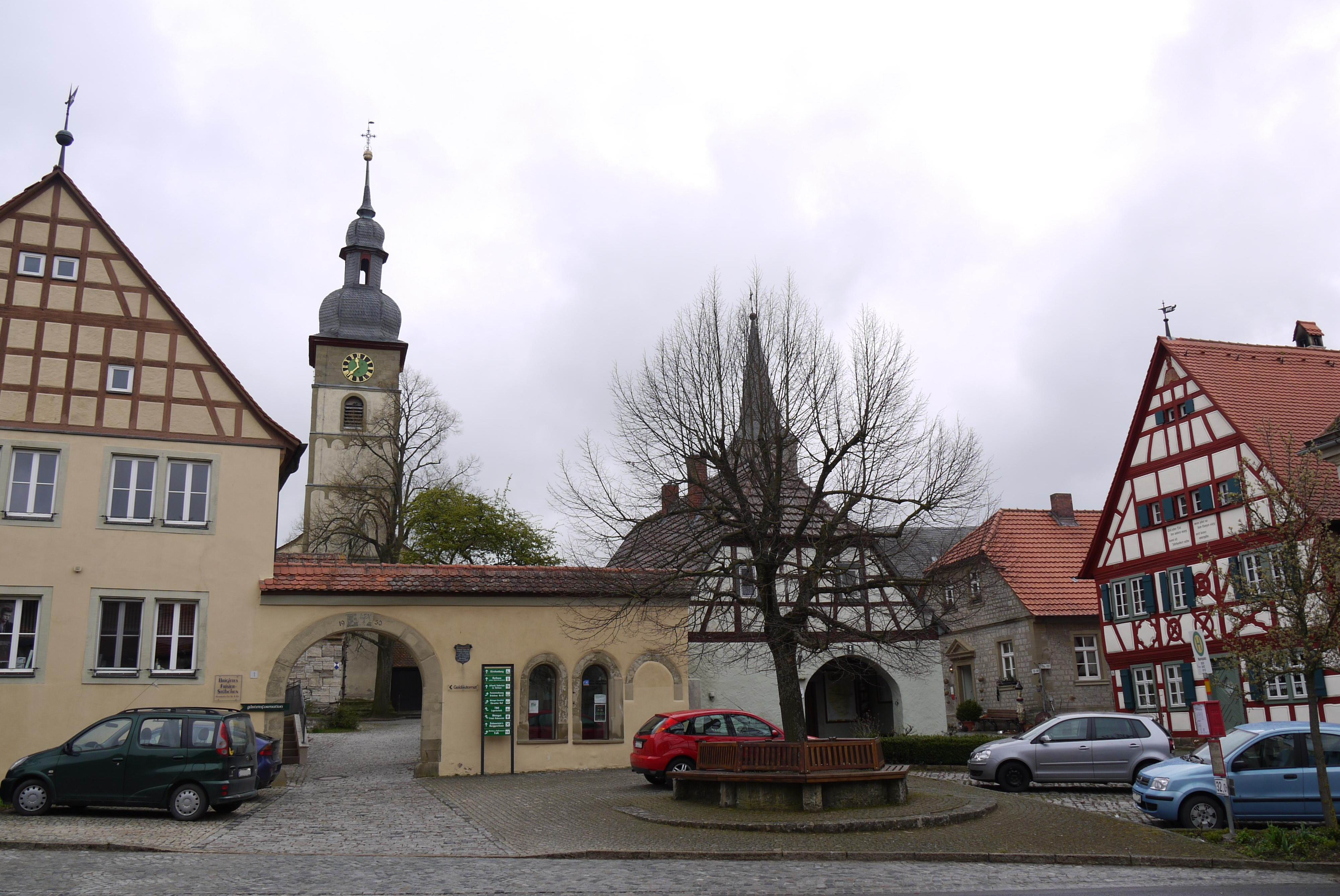
- Market square

- Coat of arms

- Location of Willanzheim within Kitzingen district
- Interactive map of Willanzheim
- Location within Germany Location within Bavaria
- Coordinates: 49°41′N 10°14′E
- Country: Germany
- State: Bavaria
- Admin. region: Unterfranken
- District: Kitzingen
- Municipal assoc.: Iphofen

Government
  - Mayor (2020–26): Ingrid Reifenscheid-Eckert

Area
  - Total: 25.19 km^{2} (9.73 sq mi)
- Elevation: 260 m (850 ft)

Population (2025-12-31)
  - Total: 1,597
  - Density: 63.40/km^{2} (164.2/sq mi)
- Time zone: UTC+01:00 (CET)
  - Summer (DST): UTC+02:00 (CEST)
- Postal codes: 97348
- Dialling codes: 09323 und 09326
- Vehicle registration: KT
- Website: www.willanzheim.de

Willanzheim is a market town in the district of Kitzingen in Bavaria in Germany. Notable natives include Philipp Joseph Frick, b. April 14, 1742, organist, composer, and performer on the glass armonica.

In 1853, a cache of 163 gold coins, mostly 14th century Florentine gold florins, was discovered in a dung-pit in a Willanzheim farm. Some are now in the collection of the Staatliche Münzsammlung, München.
