= Oppenheimer (surname) =

Oppenheimer is a toponymic surname, derived from the German town Oppenheim, common among Germans and Ashkenazi Jews.

Most uses refer to J. Robert Oppenheimer (1904–1967), the American physicist who headed the Manhattan Project.

Other notable people with the surname include:

== In arts and media ==
- Alan Oppenheimer (born 1930), American film actor
- Andrés Oppenheimer (born 1951), Argentine author and journalist known for his analysis of Latin American politics
- Deborah Oppenheimer an American film and television producer
- George Oppenheimer (1900–1977) was an American screenwriter, playwright, and journalist.
- Jerry Oppenheimer (fl. 1980s–2010s), American biographer
- Jess Oppenheimer (1913–1988), American radio and television writer, producer, and director, creator of I Love Lucy
- Joel Oppenheimer (1930–1988), American writer
- Joshua Oppenheimer (born 1974), American film director
- Mark Oppenheimer, American author and editor
- Joshua Oppenheimer (fl. 2000s–2020s), American screenwriter
- Lillian Oppenheimer (1898–1992), American origami pioneer
- Max Oppenheimer (1885–1954), Austrian painter and graphic artist
- Meaghan Oppenheimer (born 1986), American screenwriter and producer
- Stephen Oppenheimer (born 1947), British paediatrician, geneticist, and writer on genetics and human prehistory

== In business ==
=== Minerals ===
- Bernard Oppenheimer (1866–1921), South African and British diamond merchant and philanthropist, brother of Ernest
- Ernest Oppenheimer (1880–1957), diamond and gold mining entrepreneur and financier; controlled De Beers and founded the Anglo American Corporation of South Africa, brother of Bernard
- Harry Oppenheimer (1908–2000), South African businessman of De Beers Consolidated Mines Limited, son of Ernest
- Jonathan Oppenheimer (born 1969), South African businessman and conservationist, a former executive of De Beers
- Nicky Oppenheimer (born 1945), chairman of De Beers and of The Diamond Trading Company, son of Harry

=== Other businesses ===
- Damon Oppenheimer (born 1962), Vice President and Director of Amateur Scouting for the New York Yankees
- Joseph Oppenheimer (1820–1893), German-British businessman and inventor of telegraphic equipment
- Joseph Süß Oppenheimer (1698–1738), financial adviser to Karl Alexander, Duke of Württemberg
- Samuel Oppenheimer (1635–1703), Jewish banker
- Peter Oppenheimer (fl. 1980s–2020s), American business executive, first CFO of Apple Inc
- Peter C. Oppenheimer, chief global equity strategist and head of Macro Research in Europe within Global Investment Research at Goldman Sachs

== In fiction ==
- Norman Oppenheimer, a fixer and the lead character in the 2016 film Norman: The Moderate Rise and Tragic Fall of a New York Fixer

== In government and law ==
- Charles Cuprill Oppenheimer (1916–2011), lawyer and Rotary District Governor for Puerto Rico
- David Oppenheimer (1834–1897), second mayor of Vancouver, British Columbia, Canada
- Kay Oppenheimer (fl. 2000s), member of the New Hampshire House of Representatives
- Reuben Oppenheimer (1897–1982), justice of the Maryland Court of Appeals
- Santiago Oppenheimer (1869 – ca. 1930), mayor of Ponce, Puerto Rico, in 1906
- Simon Wolf Oppenheimer (died 1726), German Jewish banker and Court Jew of the Electorate of Brunswick-Lüneburg
- Suzi Oppenheimer (born 1934), New York politician

== In science and academia ==
- Amy Oppenheimer (born 1952), American lawyer
- Clive Oppenheimer (born 1964), British volcanologist
- Daniel M. Oppenheimer (fl. 2000s–2020s), American professor of psychology at UCLA
- David B. Oppenheimer (born 1950), American professor of law at UC Berkeley
- Frank Oppenheimer (1912–1985), American physicist, brother of J. Robert Oppenheimer, founder of the Exploratorium in San Francisco
- Franz Oppenheimer (1864–1943), German sociologist and political economist
- Hillel Oppenheimer (1899–1971), Israeli professor of botany, son of Franz
- Jane M. Oppenheimer (1911–1996), American embryologist and historian of science
- Katherine Oppenheimer (1910–1972), German-American biologist, wife of J. Robert Oppenheimer
- Melanie Oppenheimer (born 1957), Australian historian
- Michael Oppenheimer (born 1946), American professor of geosciences at Princeton University, authority on climate change
- Rebecca Oppenheimer (born 1972), American astrophysicist
- Stephen Oppenheimer (born 1947), British popular science writer in prehistory

== In sport ==
- Carlos Javier Correa Oppenheimer Jr. (born 1994), Puerto Rican-American professional baseball player
- Damon Oppenheimer (born 1962), Vice President and Director of Amateur Scouting for the New York Yankees
- Josh Oppenheimer (born 1969), Israeli-American basketball coach, and former basketball player
- Thomas Oppenheimer (born 1988), German ice hockey player

== In other fields ==
- David Oppenheim (rabbi) (1664–1736), also called Oppenheimer, rabbi of Prague and bibliophile
- Isabel Luberza Oppenheimer (1901–1974), also known as Isabel la Negra, Puerto Rican madam

== See also ==
- Oppenheim (surname)
