= Oppenheim (surname) =

Oppenheim is a German and Ashkenazi Jewish surname. Notable people with the surname include:

- A. Leo Oppenheim (1904–1974), Assyriologist
- Alan V. Oppenheim (born 1937), professor of Electrical Engineering at MIT and author
- Alexander Oppenheim (1903–1997), British mathematician and university administrator
- Alfred Freiherr von Oppenheim (1934–2005), associate of Sal. Oppenheim bank
- Alfred Oppenheim (chemist) (1878–1943), German chemist and manufacturer
- Avrohom Chaim Oppenheim (1796?–1824?), Rabbi at Péczel, Hungary
- Berthold Oppenheim (1867–1942), Moravian rabbi
- David Ernst Oppenheim (1881–1943), Austrian educator
- David Oppenheim (clarinetist) (1922–2007), American clarinetist and classical music and television producer
- David Oppenheim (poker player), American professional poker player
- David Oppenheim (rabbi) (1664–1736), chief rabbi of Prague
- Dennis Oppenheim (1938–2011), American conceptual artist, performance artist, sculptor, and photographer
- Duncan Oppenheim (1904–2003), British businessman
- E. Phillips Oppenheim (1866–1946), English novelist
- Franz Oppenheim (1852–1929), German chemist, entrepreneur and industrialist
- Heinrich Bernhard Oppenheim (1819–1880), German jurist, politician, and philosopher
- Hermann Oppenheim (1858–1919), German neurologist
- James Oppenheim (1882–1932), American poet, author, and editor
- Jeanette Oppenheim (born 1952), Danish lawyer and politician, MEP
- Jill Arlyn Oppenheim (born 1940), American actress better known as Jill St. John
- Joachim Oppenheim (1832–1891), rabbi and author
- Jonathan Oppenheim, British scientist
- Jonathan Oppenheim (film editor) (1951–2020), American film editor
- L. F. L. Oppenheim (1858–1919), German jurist
- Lisa Oppenheim (born 1972), American artist
- Martin Wilhelm Oppenheim (1781–1853), German banker
- Max von Oppenheim (1860–1946), German diplomat and archaeologist
- Meret Oppenheim (1913–1985), Swiss artist and lyricist
- Moritz Daniel Oppenheim (1800–1882), German painter
- Noah Oppenheim (born 1980), American writer, television producer, and President of NBC News
- Otto Georg Oppenheim (1817–1909), German jurist
- Rob Oppenheim (born 1980), American professional golfer
- Sally Oppenheim (1928–2025), shortened name for Sally Oppenheim-Barnes, Baroness Oppenheim-Barnes, UK member of Parliament
- Salomon Oppenheim, Jr. (1772–1828), founder of the Sal. Oppenheim bank
- Samuel Oppenheim (1857–1928), Austrian astronomer

== See also ==
- Oppenheim family, prominent European banking family since the 18th century
- Oppenheimer, a similar surname, also of German and Ashkenazi Jewish origin
