= 2016 Major League Baseball season =

2016 MLB season
- League: Major League Baseball
- Sport: Baseball
- Duration: April 3 – November 2, 2016
- Games: 162
- Teams: 30
- TV partner(s): Fox/FS1; TBS; ESPN; MLB Network

Draft
- Top draft pick: Mickey Moniak
- Picked by: Philadelphia Phillies

Regular season
- Season MVP: AL: Mike Trout (LAA); NL: Kris Bryant (CHC)

Postseason
- AL champions: Cleveland Indians
- AL runners-up: Toronto Blue Jays
- NL champions: Chicago Cubs
- NL runners-up: Los Angeles Dodgers

World Series
- Champions: Chicago Cubs
- Runners-up: Cleveland Indians
- World Series MVP: Ben Zobrist (CHC)

MLB seasons
- ← 2015 2017 →

Locations of AL teams for the 2013–2019 MLB seasons
West Central East
Locations of NL teams for the 2013–2016 MLB seasons
West Central East

The 2016 Major League Baseball season began on April 3, 2016, with a Sunday afternoon matchup between the St. Louis Cardinals and the Pittsburgh Pirates, the two teams with the best regular-season records in 2015, at PNC Park in Pittsburgh. The regular season ended on Sunday, October 2, 2016, and the postseason on Wednesday, November 2, 2016, with the Chicago Cubs coming back from a three games to one deficit to defeat the Cleveland Indians in the World Series and win their first championship since 1908.

The Los Angeles Angels of Anaheim shortened their name to its original Los Angeles Angels.

The Major League Baseball All-Star Game's 87th edition was played on July 12 at Petco Park in San Diego, California, home of the San Diego Padres. The American League was awarded home-field advantage in the World Series by winning the game 4–2.

The season featured two cancelled games. The first was the September 25th game between the Marlins and Braves following the death of Jose Fernandez. The second was a makeup between Cleveland and Detroit was to occur on October 3rd but was cancelled due to having no impact on the league standings.

== Standings ==
=== American League ===
AL East
Team	W	L	Pct.	GB	Home	Road
^{(3)} Boston Red Sox	93	69	.574	—	47‍–‍34	46‍–‍35
^{(4)} Toronto Blue Jays	89	73	.549	4	51‍–‍30	38‍–‍43
^{(5)} Baltimore Orioles	89	73	.549	4	50‍–‍31	39‍–‍42
New York Yankees	84	78	.519	9	48‍–‍33	36‍–‍45
Tampa Bay Rays	68	94	.420	25	36‍–‍45	32‍–‍49

AL Central
Team	W	L	Pct.	GB	Home	Road
^{(2)} Cleveland Indians	94	67	.584	—	53‍–‍28	41‍–‍39
Detroit Tigers	86	75	.534	8	45‍–‍35	41‍–‍40
Kansas City Royals	81	81	.500	13½	47‍–‍34	34‍–‍47
Chicago White Sox	78	84	.481	16½	45‍–‍36	33‍–‍48
Minnesota Twins	59	103	.364	35½	30‍–‍51	29‍–‍52

AL West
Team	W	L	Pct.	GB	Home	Road
^{(1)} Texas Rangers	95	67	.586	—	53‍–‍28	42‍–‍39
Seattle Mariners	86	76	.531	9	44‍–‍37	42‍–‍39
Houston Astros	84	78	.519	11	43‍–‍38	41‍–‍40
Los Angeles Angels	74	88	.457	21	40‍–‍41	34‍–‍47
Oakland Athletics	69	93	.426	26	34‍–‍47	35‍–‍46

=== National League ===
NL East
Team	W	L	Pct.	GB	Home	Road
^{(2)} Washington Nationals	95	67	.586	—	50‍–‍31	45‍–‍36
^{(4)} New York Mets	87	75	.537	8	44‍–‍37	43‍–‍38
Miami Marlins	79	82	.491	15½	40‍–‍40	39‍–‍42
Philadelphia Phillies	71	91	.438	24	37‍–‍44	34‍–‍47
Atlanta Braves	68	93	.422	26½	31‍–‍50	37‍–‍43

NL Central
Team	W	L	Pct.	GB	Home	Road
^{(1)} Chicago Cubs	103	58	.640	—	57‍–‍24	46‍–‍34
St. Louis Cardinals	86	76	.531	17½	38‍–‍43	48‍–‍33
Pittsburgh Pirates	78	83	.484	25	38‍–‍42	40‍–‍41
Milwaukee Brewers	73	89	.451	30½	41‍–‍40	32‍–‍49
Cincinnati Reds	68	94	.420	35½	38‍–‍43	30‍–‍51

NL West
Team	W	L	Pct.	GB	Home	Road
^{(3)} Los Angeles Dodgers	91	71	.562	—	53‍–‍28	38‍–‍43
^{(5)} San Francisco Giants	87	75	.537	4	45‍–‍36	42‍–‍39
Colorado Rockies	75	87	.463	16	42‍–‍39	33‍–‍48
Arizona Diamondbacks	69	93	.426	22	33‍–‍48	36‍–‍45
San Diego Padres	68	94	.420	23	39‍–‍42	29‍–‍52

== Postseason ==
=== Bracket ===
Wild Card Game (ALWC, NLWC)
4	Toronto	1
5	Baltimore	0
4	NY Mets	0
5	San Francisco	1

Division Series (ALDS, NLDS)
1	Texas	0
4	Toronto	3
American League
2	Cleveland	3
3	Boston	0
1	Chicago Cubs	3
5	San Francisco	1
National League
2	Washington	2
3	LA Dodgers	3

League Championship Series (ALCS, NLCS)
4	Toronto	1
2	Cleveland	4
1	Chicago Cubs	4
3	LA Dodgers	2

World Series
AL2	Cleveland	3
NL1	Chicago Cubs	4

== Schedule ==
As was the case in 2015, teams were scheduled to play 19 games against each division opponent for a total of 76 games, and six or seven games against each team from the other two divisions in its league for a total of 66 games. The Civil Rights Game was not played this year.

All teams were scheduled to play 20 interleague games throughout the season. For 2016, the interleague matchups were to be AL East vs. NL West, AL Central vs. NL East, and AL West vs. NL Central.

On July 3, 2016, the Atlanta Braves and Miami Marlins played the Fort Bragg Game, a special neutral-site game at Fort Bragg Stadium, a newly constructed field in Fort Bragg, North Carolina, in observance of the Independence Day long weekend. It was the first professional, regular-season sporting event held on an active military installation. A two-game series between the Pittsburgh Pirates and Miami Marlins was also scheduled for Hiram Bithorn Stadium in Puerto Rico in May 2016; however, on May 6, 2016, Major League Baseball announced that the Puerto Rico games would be postponed due to the ongoing Zika virus epidemic, and moved back to Marlins Park.

== Rule changes ==
In February 2016, Major League Baseball and the Major League Baseball Players Association agreed to two rule changes.

- Rule 6.01(j) delineates criteria for a legal slide while trying to break up a double play, which is defined as making contact with the ground before reaching the base, being able to and attempting to reach the base with a hand or foot, being able to and attempting to remain on the base at the completion of the slide (except at home plate) and not changing his path for the purpose of initiating contact with a fielder. This is intended to protect infielders while still allowing for aggressive baserunning. This rule was implemented after Los Angeles Dodgers infielder Chase Utley slid into New York Mets infielder Ruben Tejada during the seventh inning of Game 2 in the previous year's National League Division Series.
- The second rule change limits managers and coaches visits to the mound to 30 seconds and shortens between innings break times by 20 seconds to match television commercial breaks.

== Managerial changes ==
=== General managers ===
==== Offseason ====
Team	Former GM	New GM	Reason for leaving	Notes
Atlanta Braves	John Hart	John Coppolella	Promoted	On October 1, 2015, John Coppolella was promoted to General Manager, replacing John Hart, who will continue in his role as President of Baseball Operations.
Cincinnati Reds	Walt Jocketty	Dick Williams	Promoted	On November 4, 2015, Dick Williams was promoted to General Manager, replacing Walt Jocketty, who will stay on as director of operations for at least one more year.
Los Angeles Angels	Bill Stoneman	Billy Eppler	Interim	On October 4, 2015, the night after the regular season ended in a loss to the Rangers, the Angels hired Billy Eppler as their new permanent general manager, replacing Bill Stoneman, who was the interim GM after Jerry Dipoto who resigned earlier in the season.
Milwaukee Brewers	Doug Melvin	David Stearns	Resigned	On September 21, 2015, David Stearns replaced Doug Melvin who resigned from the club as general manager. He started his new job on October 5.
Philadelphia Phillies	Ruben Amaro Jr.	Matt Klentak	Fired	On October 24, 2015, Matt Klentak was hired as the new permanent general manager to replace interim GM Scott Proefrock, who was a temporary replacement for Ruben Amaro Jr., who was fired on September 10.
Oakland Athletics	Billy Beane	David Forst	Promoted	On October 5, 2015, General Manager Billy Beane was promoted to executive general manager. David Forst was promoted as the new general manager.
Seattle Mariners	Jeff Kingston	Jerry Dipoto	Interim	On September 28, 2015, Jerry Dipoto was named the new permanent general manager of the Mariners, replacing interim GM Jeff Kingston, who replaced Jack Zduriencik.
Toronto Blue Jays	Alex Anthopoulos	Ross Atkins	Resigned	Anthopoulos resigned on October 29, 2015, after six seasons as the general manager of the Blue Jays. Ross Atkins was named new GM days later.
Miami Marlins	Dan Jennings	Michael Hill	Fired	Jennings was fired on October 29, 2015, as general manager of the Marlins. Michael Hill was named as his replacement.

==== In-season ====
Date	Team	Former GM	New GM	Reason for leaving	Notes
July 18	Minnesota Twins	Terry Ryan	Rob Antony	Fired	The Twins fired Terry Ryan and replaced him with Vice President and Assistant General Manager Rob Antony on an interim basis.

=== Field managers ===
==== Offseason ====
Team	Former manager	Interim manager	Reason for leaving	New manager	Notes
Washington Nationals	Matt Williams	None	Fired	Dusty Baker	Matt Williams was fired on October 5, 2015, after two seasons with the team. He guided them to the division title in 2014 before losing to the San Francisco Giants. He finished with a 179–145 record. On November 3, 2015, the Nationals announced that Dusty Baker will be their new manager for the 2016 season.
San Diego Padres	Bud Black	Pat Murphy	Fired	Andy Green	Pat Murphy was named interim manager on June 16, 2015, after Bud Black was fired. He finished the 2015 season with a record of 42–53. On October 29, 2015, Andy Green was named the new permanent manager of the Padres.
Miami Marlins	Mike Redmond	Dan Jennings	Fired	Don Mattingly	Jennings made the unusual move from GM to manager when the Marlins fired Mike Redmond in May after a 16–22 start. The change failed to spark a turnaround, and the injury-riddled Marlins finished at 71–91, their sixth consecutive losing season. Jennings returned as GM and was subsequently fired from that role. On October 29, 2015, Don Mattingly was named the new manager.
Seattle Mariners	Lloyd McClendon	None	Fired	Scott Servais	McClendon compiled records of 87–75 in 2014 and 76–86 in 2015. On October 9, 2015, it was reported that new Mariners GM Jerry Dipoto wished to hire a new manager, rather than retain McClendon from the previous GM, Jack Zduriencik. On October 23, 2015, Scott Servais was the hired as the team's new manager.
Los Angeles Dodgers	Don Mattingly	None	Mutual Decision	Dave Roberts	Don Mattingly and the Dodgers parted ways on October 22 after five seasons together. The Dodgers had won their third straight NL West Championship, marking the first time in franchise history that they made the playoffs three years in a row. Their season ended when they lost to the New York Mets in the Division Series. Mattingly finished with a 446–363 record. On November 23, 2015, Dave Roberts was named the Los Angeles Dodgers new manager.

==== In-season ====
Date	Team	Former manager	Interim manager	Reason for leaving	New manager	Notes
May 17	Atlanta Braves	Fredi González	Brian Snitker	Fired	Brian Snitker	González was fired after starting the season with a 9–28 record, which was the worst record in baseball at the time. González in six-plus seasons finished with a 434–413 record with two playoff appearances. After the season was over, Brian Snitker was named as the new manager on October 11, 2016, dropping the "interim" title.

== League leaders ==
=== American League ===
Hitting leaders
Stat	Player	Total
AVG	Jose Altuve (HOU)	.338
OPS	David Ortiz (BOS)	1.021
HR	Mark Trumbo (BAL)	47
RBI	Edwin Encarnación (TOR); David Ortiz (BOS)	127
R	Mike Trout (LAA)	123
H	Jose Altuve (HOU)	216
SB	Rajai Davis (CLE)	43

Pitching leaders
Stat	Player	Total
W	Rick Porcello (BOS)	22
L	Chris Archer (TB)	19
ERA	Aaron Sanchez (TOR)	3.00
K	Justin Verlander (DET)	254
IP	David Price (BOS)	230.0
SV	Zach Britton (BAL)	47
WHIP	Justin Verlander (DET)	1.001

=== National League ===
Hitting leaders
Stat	Player	Total
AVG	DJ LeMahieu (COL)	.348
OPS	Daniel Murphy (WSH)	.985
HR	Nolan Arenado (COL); Chris Carter (MIL)	41
RBI	Nolan Arenado (COL)	133
R	Kris Bryant (CHC)	121
H	Jean Segura (AZ)	203
SB	Jonathan Villar (MIL)	62

Pitching leaders
Stat	Player	Total
W	Max Scherzer (WSH)	20
L	Jimmy Nelson (MIL)	16
ERA	Kyle Hendricks (CHC)	2.13
K	Max Scherzer (WSH)	284
IP	Max Scherzer (WSH)	228.1
SV	Jeurys Familia (NYM)	51
WHIP	Max Scherzer (WSH)	0.968

== Milestones ==
=== Batters ===
- Trevor Story (COL):
  - Became the sixth player in Major League history to hit two home runs in his debut, following Charlie Reilly, Bob Nieman, Bert Campaneris, Mark Quinn and J. P. Arencibia. He also became the first National League player to hit two home runs in his debut, and he became the first player to hit two homers in his debut on Opening Day.
  - With a home run in his next game, Story joined the Cardinals' Joe Cunningham in 1954 as the only players in modern history (since 1900) with three home runs in his first two career games.
  - With another home run in his third consecutive game, Story became the first player in Major League history to hit a home run in each of his first three big-league games. He is also the first player in Major League history to hit a home run for each of his first four hits.
  - In his fourth career game, Story hit two more home runs making him the first player in Major League history to hit a home run in each of his first four big-league games. Story also became the fifth Major League player since 1900 to homer in each of his team's first four games of a season, joining Chris Davis, Nelson Cruz, Mark McGwire and Willie Mays.
  - Hit his seventh home run of the season in his sixth career big-league game setting the record for most home runs through his first six Major League contests.
  - With his ninth home run of April, on April 27 against Pittsburgh Pirates left-hander Jon Niese, Story set a National League rookie record for home runs in April by breaking the record set in 2001 by Albert Pujols.
  - Set the National League record for home runs by a rookie shortstop by hitting his 25th home run on July 23 against the Atlanta Braves. He broke the record that was set in 2007 by Troy Tulowitzki.
- Victor Martinez (DET):
  - Became the first player in modern Major League history to hit a pinch-hit home run in his team's first two regular-season games after hitting a home run on April 6 against the Miami Marlins.
  - Recorded his 1,000th career RBI on a two-out single off Ian Kennedy of the Kansas City Royals on April 21. He became the 280th player and the fifth Venezuelan-born player to reach this mark.
- A. J. Pierzynski (ATL):
  - Recorded his 2,000th career hit with a single in the second inning against the Boston Red Sox on April 27. He became the 280th player to reach this mark.
- Ichiro Suzuki (MIA):
  - Recorded his 500th career stolen base in the first inning against the Milwaukee Brewers on April 29. He became the 38th player to reach this mark.
  - Recorded his 4,256th professional career hit, which included 1,278 hits from his time in Japan's major leagues that are not included in his official MLB total, with an infield single in the first inning against the San Diego Padres on June 15, unofficially tying Pete Rose for the all-time record for most professional hits. Suzuki then doubled in the ninth inning to unofficially surpass Rose's professional career hit record.
  - Recorded his 3,000th career hit with a triple in the seventh inning against the Colorado Rockies on August 7. He became the 30th player to reach this mark.
- Bartolo Colón (NYM):
  - The pitcher hit his first career home run in the second inning against the San Diego Padres on May 7. At age 42 years, 349 days, Colón became the oldest player in MLB history to hit his first career homer. The previous oldest player to do so was Randy Johnson, at age 40 years, 9 days.
- David Ortiz (BOS):
  - Recorded his 600th career double in the 11th inning against the Houston Astros on May 14. He became the 15th player to reach this mark. Ortiz also became the third player in Major League history to record at least 500 home runs and 600 doubles joining Hank Aaron and Barry Bonds.
- Carlos Beltrán (TEX)/(NYY):
  - Recorded his 400th career home run with a home run in the sixth inning on May 15 against the Chicago White Sox. He became the 54th player, and fourth switch-hitter, to reach this mark.
  - Recorded his 2,500th career hit with a home run in the fourth inning on May 28 against the Tampa Bay Rays. He became the 99th player, and fourth Puerto Rican-born player (Roberto Clemente, Iván Rodríguez and Roberto Alomar), to reach this mark.
  - Recorded his 1,500th career RBI with a single in the sixth inning on July 15 against the Boston Red Sox. He became the 55th player, and fourth switch-hitter, joining Mickey Mantle, Eddie Murray and Chipper Jones, to reach this mark.
  - Scored his 1,500th career run with a home run against the Baltimore Orioles on August 3. He became the 72nd player to reach this mark.
- Miguel Cabrera (DET):
  - Recorded his 500th career double in the seventh inning on May 23 against the Philadelphia Phillies. He became the 62nd player to reach this mark.
  - Recorded his 1,500th career RBI with a two-run single in the seventh inning on July 22 against the Chicago White Sox. He became the 56th player to reach this mark.
  - Recorded his 2,500th career hit with a single in the third inning against the Cleveland Indians on September 18. He became the 100th player to reach this mark.
- Adrián Beltré (TEX):
  - Recorded his 1,500th career RBI with a home run in the first inning on May 28 against the Pittsburgh Pirates. He became the 54th player to reach this mark.
- Kris Bryant (CHC):
  - Became the first player in modern Major League history, dating back to 1913, to hit three homers and two doubles in one game against the Cincinnati Reds on June 27.
- Mark Teixeira (NYY):
  - Recorded his 400th career home run with a home run in the eighth inning on July 3 against the San Diego Padres. He became the 55th player, and fifth switch-hitter, to reach this mark.
- Brandon Crawford (SF):
  - Became the sixth player in Major League history to record seven hits in one game, during a 14-inning game against the Miami Marlins on August 8. The hits tied a National League record and also marked the first time in franchise history a Giant had seven hits in a game.
- David Dahl (COL):
  - With a single in the first inning on August 11 against the Texas Rangers, Dahl extended his career-opening hitting streak to 17 games, which tied the Major League record that was set by Chuck Aleno in 1941.
- Gary Sanchez (NYY):
  - Became the fastest player in Major League history to reach 11 home runs, doing so in his 23rd career game on August 27 against the Baltimore Orioles.
  - Became the first rookie in Major League history to win consecutive Player of the Week awards. He won for the weeks ending August 21 and 28.
  - With his 19th home run on September 21 against the Tampa Bay Rays, Sanchez became the quickest player in Major League history to hit 19 home runs, doing so in his 45th game. Wally Berger of the 1930 Boston Braves owned the previous record, having done so in his 51st game.
- Corey Seager (LAD):
  - Set the single-season franchise record for home runs by a shortstop with his 23rd home run on August 27 against the Chicago Cubs. He broke the record that was set in 1930 by Glenn Wright.
- Albert Pujols (LAA):
  - Recorded his 600th career double in the first inning against the Toronto Blue Jays on September 16. He became the 16th player to reach this mark. Pujols also became the third player in Major League history to amass 575 home runs and 600 doubles in his career, joining Hank Aaron and Barry Bonds.
  - Hit his 30th home run of the season on September 17 against the Toronto Blue Jays. This was his 14th season of at least 30 homers making him the fourth player in Major League history to accomplish this feat. He joins Hank Aaron, Barry Bonds and Alex Rodriguez.

=== Pitchers ===
==== No-hitters ====
- Jake Arrieta (CHC):
  - Threw his second career no-hitter by defeating the Cincinnati Reds 16–0 on April 21. Arrieta walked four and struck out six as he became the fourth reigning Cy Young winner (joining Sandy Koufax, Bob Gibson, and Clayton Kershaw), to throw a no-hitter the following season. Arrieta threw 119 pitches, 71 of which were strikes. The no-hitter was historically notable for some other reasons:
    - The Cubs' 16 runs were the most scored by the winning team in any no-hitter in baseball's modern era (post-1900). The only no-hitter in which more runs were scored was in 1884, when the Buffalo Bisons defeated the Detroit Wolverines 18–0 behind Pud Galvin's no-hitter.
    - Arrieta became the first pitcher to go unbeaten in the regular season between no-hitters since Johnny Vander Meer, who threw consecutive no-hitters in 1938.

==== Other pitching accomplishments ====
- Jonathan Papelbon (WSH):
  - Recorded his 350th career save by closing out a 4–3 win on April 4 against the Atlanta Braves. He becomes the 11th player to reach this mark.
- Brett Cecil (TOR):
  - Recorded his 38th consecutive game played without allowing an earned run on April 4 against the Tampa Bay Rays. This tied the major league record set by Craig Kimbrel. Cecil's streak came to an end the day later, when Logan Forsythe hit a home run off of him.
- John Lackey (CHC):
  - Became the 16th pitcher to beat all 30 Major League baseball teams by defeating the St. Louis Cardinals on April 18.
  - Recorded his 2,000th career strikeout by striking out Jayson Werth of the Washington Nationals in the fourth inning on May 6. He became the 75th player to reach this mark.
- Félix Hernández (SEA):
  - Became the Mariners all-time franchise leader in victories by recording his 146th career win against the Tampa Bay Rays on May 9. He broke the record that he held with Jamie Moyer.
  - Recorded his 150th career win with a victory against the Los Angeles Angels of Anaheim on August 15. He became the 255th player to reach this mark.
- Max Scherzer (WSH):
  - Became the fourth pitcher to strike out 20 batters in a nine-inning outing, joining Roger Clemens (who did it twice), Kerry Wood and Randy Johnson. Scherzer did this on May 11 against the Detroit Tigers.
- Justin Verlander (DET):
  - Recorded his 2,000th career strikeout by striking out Eddie Rosario of the Minnesota Twins in the fourth inning on May 18. He became the 76th player to reach this mark.
- Francisco Rodriguez (DET):
  - Recorded his 400th career save by closing out a 3–1 win on May 24 against the Philadelphia Phillies. He becomes the sixth player to reach this mark.
- Zack Greinke (AZ):
  - Recorded his 150th career win with a victory against the Tampa Bay Rays on June 7. He became the 253rd player to reach this mark.
  - Recorded his 2,000th career strikeout by striking out Freddie Freeman of the Atlanta Braves in the fourth inning on August 24. He became the 78th player to reach this mark.
- Cole Hamels (TEX):
  - Recorded his 2,000th career strikeout by striking out Leonys Martin of the Seattle Mariners in the third inning on June 12. He became the 77th player to reach this mark.
- Jake Peavy (SF):
  - Recorded his 150th career win with a victory against the Los Angeles Dodgers on June 12. He became the 254th player to reach this mark.
- Kenley Jansen (LAD):
  - Became the Dodgers all-time franchise leader in saves by recording his 162nd career save by closing out a 4–1 win against the Washington Nationals on June 20.
- Marco Estrada (TOR):
  - Pitched his 11th consecutive start allowing five hits or fewer, while going at least six innings on June 21. This set a new Major League record; Johnny Cueto, Jake Arrieta, and Johan Santana were the only other pitchers to accomplish ten such starts in a row.
- Danny Duffy (KC):
  - Set the franchise single-game record by striking out 16 Tampa Bay Rays on August 1. He broke the record that was held by Zack Greinke.
- Roberto Osuna (TOR):
  - Recorded his 47th career save, which set a new Major League record for a pitcher under the age of 22. Terry Forster previously held this record.
- Jon Gray (COL):
  - Set the franchise record for most strikeouts in a game with 16 against the San Diego Padres on September 17. He broke the record that was set by Darryl Kile in 1998.
- Jered Weaver (LAA):
  - Recorded his 150th career win with a victory against the Texas Rangers on September 21. He became the 256th player to reach this mark.
- Andrew Miller (CLE):
  - Set the Major League record for most strikeouts by a relief pitcher in a single postseason with 29 on October 29. He broke the record set by Francisco Rodríguez in 2002.

=== Miscellaneous ===
- The Los Angeles Dodgers defeated the San Diego Padres 15–0 on Opening Day, making this the largest shutout victory on Opening Day in Major League history.
- The San Diego Padres became the first team in Major League history to be shut out in three consecutive games to open a season. San Diego lost to Los Angeles by the scores of 15–0, 3–0 and 7–0, respectively. Previously, the St. Louis Browns had had the worst start, going scoreless in their first 26 innings in 1943.
- The Cincinnati Reds' bullpen set a record by allowing a run in 23 consecutive games from April 10 to May 5. The previous record had been 20, set by the 2013 Colorado Rockies.
- Major League Baseball set a new league record with 6,726 strikeouts in the month of May.
- On June 25, the Chicago White Sox tied the Major League record for most home runs hit in a single game by a losing team. Chicago hit seven home runs, but still lost 10–8 against the Toronto Blue Jays. The only other team to accomplish this feat was the Detroit Tigers on May 28, 1995, and August 8, 2004.
- With Hyun Soo Kim's home run on June 30 in the seventh inning against the Seattle Mariners, the Baltimore Orioles set the Major League record for most home runs hit by a team for the month of June. The Orioles 56 home runs broke the record of 55 home runs that was set by the 1996 Oakland Athletics.
- On July 19 against the Baltimore Orioles, New York Yankees outfielder Jacoby Ellsbury reached base via catcher's interference for the ninth time of the season, setting a new Major League record for most in a season. He broke the record that was set in 1992 by Roberto Kelly.
- On August 11 the Milwaukee Brewers scored in every inning they batted against the Atlanta Braves. They became the 19th team since 1900 to accomplish this. Then on September 12, the Chicago White Sox became the 20th in an 11–4 win against the Cleveland Indians.
- On August 19 the Baltimore Orioles set a new Major League record by hitting four home runs before recording their first out, in the course of a five run first inning against the Houston Astros.
- The Twins Max Kepler's home run in the third inning on August 31 against the Cleveland Indians was the 1,034th homer in Major League baseball for August. That is the most home runs hit in the month of August in Major League history. It is also the third-most homers hit in any month in Major League history (1,069 in May 2000, 1,101 in June 2017).
- The Cincinnati Reds gave up their 242nd home run on September 19. That is the most home runs allowed in a season by a team in Major League history. The 1996 Detroit Tigers held the previous mark with 241 home runs allowed. Prior to this game, Cincinnati had been tied for the high among National League clubs with the Colorado Rockies, who allowed 239 home runs in 2001.
- In Game 3 of the 2016 ALDS on October 9, the Toronto Blue Jays defeated the Texas Rangers by a score of 7–6. In the bottom of the 10th inning, Rougned Odor threw away a potential inning-ending double play ball, allowing Josh Donaldson to score the winning run from second base. It was the first time in MLB history that a playoff series ended via a walk-off error.
- The Cleveland Indians defeated the Toronto Blue Jays in the 2016 ALCS despite hitting just .168, setting a Major League record for the lowest batting average for a winning team in a postseason series. The previous record had been .180 by the Atlanta Braves in the 1996 NLDS.
- The Cleveland Indians defeated the Chicago Cubs 1–0 in Game 3 of the 2016 World Series. This was the Indians' fifth shutout of the postseason, setting a Major League record.

== Awards and honors ==
=== Regular season ===
Baseball Writers' Association of America Awards
BBWAA Award	National League	American League
Rookie of the Year	Corey Seager (LAD)	Michael Fulmer (DET)
Cy Young Award	Max Scherzer (WSH)	Rick Porcello (BOS)
Manager of the Year	Dave Roberts (LAD)	Terry Francona (CLE)
Most Valuable Player	Kris Bryant (CHC)	Mike Trout (LAA)
Gold Glove Awards
Position	National League	American League
Pitcher	Zack Greinke (AZ)	Dallas Keuchel (HOU)
Catcher	Buster Posey (SF)	Salvador Pérez (KC)
1st Base	Anthony Rizzo (CHC)	Mitch Moreland (TEX)
2nd Base	Joe Panik (SF)	Ian Kinsler (DET)
3rd Base	Nolan Arenado (COL)	Adrián Beltré (TEX)
Shortstop	Brandon Crawford (SF)	Francisco Lindor (CLE)
Left field	Starling Marte (PIT)	Brett Gardner (NYY)
Center field	Ender Inciarte (ATL)	Kevin Kiermaier (TB)
Right field	Jason Heyward (CHC)	Mookie Betts (BOS)
Silver Slugger Awards
Pitcher/Designated Hitter	Jake Arrieta (CHC)	David Ortiz (BOS)
Catcher	Wilson Ramos (WSH)	Salvador Pérez (KC)
1st Base	Anthony Rizzo (CHC)	Miguel Cabrera (DET)
2nd Base	Daniel Murphy (WSH)	Jose Altuve (HOU)
3rd Base	Nolan Arenado (COL)	Josh Donaldson (TOR)
Shortstop	Corey Seager (LAD)	Xander Bogaerts (BOS)
Left Field	Yoenis Céspedes (NYM)	Mookie Betts (BOS)
Center Field	Charlie Blackmon (COL)	Mike Trout (LAA)
Right Field	Christian Yelich (MIA)	Mark Trumbo (BAL)

=== Other awards ===
- The Sporting News Player of the Year Award: Jose Altuve (HOU)
- Comeback Players of the Year: Mark Trumbo (BAL, American); José Fernández (MIA, National)
- Edgar Martínez Award (Best designated hitter): David Ortiz (BOS)
- Hank Aaron Award: David Ortiz (BOS, American); Kris Bryant (CHC, National)
- Roberto Clemente Award (Humanitarian): Curtis Granderson (NYM)
- Mariano Rivera AL Reliever of the Year Award (Best AL reliever): Zach Britton (BAL)
- Trevor Hoffman NL Reliever of the Year Award (Best NL reliever): Kenley Jansen (LAD)
- Warren Spahn Award (Best left-handed pitcher): Jon Lester (CHC)

Fielding Bible Awards
Position	Player
Pitcher	Dallas Keuchel (HOU)
Catcher	Buster Posey (SF)
1st Base	Anthony Rizzo (CHC)
2nd Base	Dustin Pedroia (BOS)
3rd Base	Nolan Arenado (COL)
Shortstop	Andrelton Simmons (LAA)
Left Field	Starling Marte (PIT)
Center Field	Kevin Pillar (TOR)
Right Field	Mookie Betts (BOS)
Multi-position	Javier Baez (CHC)

=== Monthly awards ===
==== Player of the Month ====
Month	American League	National League
April	Manny Machado	Bryce Harper
May	Jackie Bradley Jr.	Daniel Murphy
June	Jose Altuve	Wil Myers
July	Mookie Betts	Daniel Murphy
August	Gary Sánchez	Kris Bryant
September	Miguel Cabrera	Freddie Freeman

==== Pitcher of the Month ====
Month	American League	National League
April	Jordan Zimmermann	Jake Arrieta
May	Rich Hill	Clayton Kershaw
June	Danny Salazar	Jon Lester
July	Justin Verlander	Stephen Strasburg
August	Corey Kluber	Kyle Hendricks
September	Rick Porcello	Jon Lester

==== Rookie of the Month ====
Month	American League	National League
April	Nomar Mazara	Trevor Story
May	Nomar Mazara	Steven Matz
June	Tyler Naquin	Corey Seager
July	Tyler Naquin	Ryan Schimpf
August	Gary Sánchez	Trea Turner
September	Ryon Healy	Trea Turner

== Home field attendance and payroll ==
Team name	Wins	%±	Home attendance	%±	Per game	Est. payroll	%±
Los Angeles Dodgers	91	−1.1%	3,703,312	−1.6%	45,720	$231,342,096	−12.7%
St. Louis Cardinals	86	−14.0%	3,444,490	−2.2%	42,525	$150,353,500	17.2%
Toronto Blue Jays	89	−4.3%	3,392,099	21.4%	41,878	$182,690,767	54.9%
San Francisco Giants	87	3.6%	3,365,256	−0.3%	41,546	$177,021,333	−1.7%
Chicago Cubs	103	6.2%	3,232,420	10.7%	39,906	$176,097,333	52.7%
New York Yankees	84	−3.4%	3,063,405	−4.1%	37,820	$193,229,350	−9.7%
Los Angeles Angels	74	−12.9%	3,016,142	0.1%	37,236	$139,712,000	6.2%
Boston Red Sox	93	19.2%	2,955,434	2.6%	36,487	$218,682,750	18.9%
New York Mets	87	−3.3%	2,789,602	8.6%	34,440	$155,221,282	57.0%
Texas Rangers	95	8.0%	2,710,402	8.8%	33,462	$212,117,760	18.6%
Colorado Rockies	75	10.3%	2,602,524	3.8%	32,130	$89,707,000	−7.0%
Kansas City Royals	81	−14.7%	2,557,712	−5.6%	31,577	$125,132,675	2.9%
Detroit Tigers	86	16.2%	2,493,859	−8.5%	31,173	$199,902,000	16.0%
Washington Nationals	95	14.5%	2,481,938	−5.3%	30,641	$152,967,400	−13.3%
San Diego Padres	68	−8.1%	2,351,422	−4.4%	29,030	$50,656,166	−59.5%
Milwaukee Brewers	73	7.4%	2,314,614	−9.0%	28,575	$52,077,500	−26.5%
Houston Astros	84	−2.3%	2,306,623	7.1%	28,477	$89,498,000	−4.0%
Seattle Mariners	86	13.2%	2,267,928	3.4%	27,999	$137,169,100	5.0%
Pittsburgh Pirates	78	−20.4%	2,249,201	−10.0%	27,768	$81,187,933	−22.3%
Baltimore Orioles	89	9.9%	2,172,344	−4.8%	26,819	$153,744,833	36.1%
Arizona Diamondbacks	69	−12.7%	2,036,216	−2.1%	25,138	$78,399,500	21.7%
Atlanta Braves	68	1.5%	2,020,914	1.0%	24,950	$74,999,750	−27.9%
Minnesota Twins	59	−28.9%	1,963,912	−11.5%	24,246	$93,333,700	−13.4%
Philadelphia Phillies	71	12.7%	1,915,144	4.6%	23,644	$84,846,666	−17.7%
Cincinnati Reds	68	6.3%	1,894,085	−21.7%	23,384	$77,329,561	−30.7%
Chicago White Sox	78	2.6%	1,746,293	−0.5%	21,559	$113,416,000	0.5%
Miami Marlins	79	11.3%	1,712,417	−2.3%	21,405	$72,472,000	1.7%
Cleveland Indians	94	16.0%	1,591,667	14.6%	19,650	$94,511,067	59.7%
Oakland Athletics	69	1.5%	1,521,506	−14.0%	18,784	$54,969,067	−14.1%
Tampa Bay Rays	68	−15.0%	1,286,163	−0.1%	15,879	$48,223,791	−25.3%

== Uniforms ==
=== Wholesale changes ===
The Arizona Diamondbacks unveiled their new uniform concept for 2016 on December 3, 2015.

The San Diego Padres introduced new uniforms with a blue and yellow color scheme.

The silhouetted batter logo started to appear on the back belt loop of pants.

The New Era flag logo began to appear on all authentic game-used caps, starting with the 2016 postseason.

=== Alternate changes ===
The Milwaukee Brewers added a new alternate uniform with modern colors and a retro design.

The Minnesota Twins added a red alternate to their uniform lineup. It features the TC logo on the chest. Although the Twins announced they would be worn on Fridays, they wore the alternate on April 25 and September 5 (Labor Day), both Monday; they wore it on other days as well.

The Philadelphia Phillies added a red alternate that they will wear on mid-week home matinee games.

=== Anniversaries and special events ===
The following teams wore commemorative patches for special occasions:

Team	Special occasion
All teams	Pink ribbons for breast cancer awareness (May 8, Mother's Day)
All teams	"Play Ball" initiative in cooperation with USA Baseball (May 14–15)
All teams	Blue ribbons for prostate cancer awareness (June 19, Father's Day)
All teams	Gold ribbons for childhood cancer awareness (September 2)
Arizona Diamondbacks	In memory of Joe Garagiola
Arizona Diamondbacks	Gold ribbons for childhood cancer awareness (September 17)
Atlanta Braves	In memory of former coach Bobby Dews (during spring training)
Atlanta Braves	Final season at Turner Field
Baltimore Orioles	50th anniversary of 1966 World Series championship (July 8)
Boston Red Sox	Rod Carew's Heart of 29 Day in cooperation with the American Heart Association (July 21)
Boston Red Sox	In honor of David Ortiz's retirement (September 30 – October 2)
Chicago Cubs	100th anniversary at Wrigley Field
Chicago Cubs	Gold ribbons for childhood cancer awareness (September 5)
Chicago White Sox	In memory of Part-Owner Eddie Einhorn
Cincinnati Reds	In memory of former clubhouse manager Bernie Stowe
Cincinnati Reds	Number 14 patch June 25–26 (Pete Rose number retirement)
Cleveland Indians	In memory of kidnapping victim Jacob Wetterling (September 9)
Kansas City Royals	2015 World Series Championship
Los Angeles Angels of Anaheim	In memory of Dean Chance (August 20)
Los Angeles Angels of Anaheim	50th anniversary at Angel Stadium (September 9 – October 2)
Los Angeles Dodgers	Gold ribbons for childhood cancer awareness (September 17)
Miami Marlins	Number 16 patch in memory of José Fernández (from September 27 onwards)
Milwaukee Brewers	Gold ribbons for childhood cancer awareness (September 5)
Minnesota Twins	25th anniversary of 1991 World Series championship
Minnesota Twins	Rod Carew's Heart of 29 Day in cooperation with the American Heart Association (July 21)
Minnesota Twins	In memory of kidnapping victim Jacob Wetterling (September 9)
New York Mets	White ribbons on June 14 in honor of the Orlando nightclub shooting
New York Mets	Mike Piazza patch on July 30 (#31 jersey retirement)
New York Yankees	Number 8 patch in memory of Yogi Berra
Oakland Athletics	In memory of Dave Henderson (April 4)
Oakland Athletics	In memory of Tony Phillips (April 4)
Pittsburgh Pirates	White ribbons on June 14 in honor of the Orlando nightclub shooting
Pittsburgh Pirates	Bicentennial of Pittsburgh's incorporation as a city (July 9)
San Diego Padres	2016 All-Star Game
Seattle Mariners	Ken Griffey Jr. jersey retirement (August 5–6)
San Francisco Giants	"MONTE 20" patch in memory of Monte Irvin
San Francisco Giants	"DAVVY 12" patch in memory of Jim Davenport
San Francisco Giants	"Orlando" patches in honor of the Orlando nightclub shooting (June 17)
Tampa Bay Rays	"Orlando" patches in honor of the Orlando nightclub shooting (June 17)
Toronto Blue Jays	40th season of the franchise

=== Throwbacks ===
The Pirates wore yellow 1979 throwbacks on home Sunday games, replacing the 1971 throwbacks. The Pirates did wear their 1971 throwbacks on September 7, Roberto Clemente Day.

The Mets wore 1986 throwbacks on Sunday home games throughout the season to mark the 30th anniversary of their 1986 World Series title. They also wore them on May 27 and 28.

The Braves and Royals wore Negro leagues throwbacks on May 15. The Braves wore the uniforms of the Atlanta Black Crackers, and the Royals wore the uniforms of the Kansas City Monarchs.

The Phillies and Brewers wore 1976 throwbacks from June 3–5. The Phillies' throwbacks included the NL's 100th anniversary logo, while the Brewers didn't because they were an American League team at the time.

The Indians and Royals wore 1976 throwbacks on June 4.

The White Sox and Tigers wore Negro leagues throwbacks on June 4. The White Sox wore the uniforms of the Chicago American Giants, while the Tigers wore the uniforms of the Detroit Stars.

On June 18, the Giants wore 1978 orange throwbacks, while the Rays wore retro-style "fauxback" jerseys.

The Reds wore 1976 throwbacks on June 24 to mark the 40th anniversary of their 1976 World Series title.

The Brewers and Nationals as well as the Braves and Mets wore Negro leagues throwbacks on June 25. The Brewers wore the uniforms of the Milwaukee Bears, while the Nationals honored the Homestead Grays. The Braves wore the uniforms of the Atlanta Black Crackers, and the Mets wore the uniforms of the Brooklyn Royal Giants.

The Cardinals and Mariners wore 1984 throwbacks on June 25.

The Cubs and Reds wore 1916 throwbacks on July 6 to mark the 100th anniversary of the Cubs playing at Wrigley Field.

The Orioles wore 1966 throwbacks on July 8 to mark the 50th anniversary of the Orioles' 1966 World Series title.

The Angels wore 1970s throwbacks on July 15 and 16.

Eight teams wore throwbacks on July 20 as a part of an MLB "Turn Back the Clock" promotion:

- Atlanta at Cincinnati: The Braves wore 1969 throwbacks, while the Reds wore throwbacks from the early 2000s, when Ken Griffey Jr. played. The Braves' uniforms did not have an Indian on the left sleeve or the 100th anniversary of pro baseball logo on the right sleeves, which all teams wore that season.
- New York Mets at Chicago Cubs: The Mets wore 1986 road throwbacks, while the Cubs wore 1988 throwbacks.
- San Francisco at Boston: The Giants wore their 1978 throwbacks, and The Red Sox wore 1975 throwbacks.
- Texas at Los Angeles Angels: The Rangers wore their 1986 throwbacks, and the Angels wore the 1970s throwbacks they had worn July 15 and 16.

The Cardinals wore 1956 throwbacks July 23. The Cardinals uniforms didn't have the two cardinals and bat, which were only worn that season. The Dodgers, their opponent, wore Brooklyn Dodgers caps, but wore their normal road uniform.

The Brewers and Pirates wore 1990s throwbacks on July 30.

The Cubs and Athletics wore 1981 throwbacks on August 6.

The Rangers and Astros wore 1986 throwbacks on August 6 to mark the Astros' 30th anniversary of their winning the NL West title.

The Padres wore 1998 throwbacks on August 6.

The Cardinals wore 1927 throwbacks on August 27 to mark the 90th anniversary of their 1926 World Series title.

The Red Sox and Padres wore 1936 throwbacks on September 7 to mark the 80th anniversary of the Padres' debut in the Pacific Coast League.

The Reds and Pirates wore Negro leagues throwbacks on September 9. The Reds wore the uniforms of the Cincinnati Tigers, which were actually the Reds' road uniforms in the 1930s, while the Pirates wore the uniforms of the Homestead Grays (which the Nationals had worn on June 25 - the Grays called both Pittsburgh and Washington home).

The Diamondbacks will wear their 1998–2006 throwbacks on Thursday home games.

=== Other uniforms ===
The Royals wore uniforms with a golden "Royals" script and caps with a golden KC on April 3 and 5 to mark their winning the 2015 World Series. The Royals then announced they would wear the uniforms on Friday nights for the remainder of the season.

Players, coaches, and umpires at all games wore #42 on April 15, the 69th Anniversary of Jackie Robinson's debut in the majors.

Umpires wore a "EA" patch on the left sleeves honoring umpire Emmett Ashford on April 11 for breaking the color barrier for umpires.

On April 18 (Patriots' Day), the Boston Red Sox wore home white jerseys with "BOSTON" written on the front to mark the three year anniversary of the Boston Marathon bombings. The uniform also sported the 2013 navy-blue circular patch with a white border on the left shoulder saying "B Strong" (with the red B in the classic font featured on the Red Sox's caps).

The Red Sox wore a patch on April 21 to mark Earth Day. The patch is of the two hanging socks surrounded by the recycling symbol. The Red Sox had worn that logo in 2008 and 2009.

The Reds and Giants wore Spanish-language "Los Rojos" and "Gigantes" uniforms respectively on May 5, Cinco de Mayo. The Reds wore the "Los Rojos" uniforms again on August 13 and September 16 (as part of a Fiesta Rojos promotion).

Teams wore special caps and uniforms with pink lettering on May 8, Mother's Day.

The Reds wore camouflage caps and uniforms on May 21, Armed Forces Day, June 12, August 19 and September 2. The team's uniforms had the "Reds" script wordmark on the front, rather than the "C" and the Reds and the player's number.

The Blue Jays wore a 1970s-era cap May 29 to mark the franchise's 40th season.

Teams wore camouflage caps and uniforms May 30, Memorial Day in the United States. The uniforms were woodland camouflage, licensed from the US Marine Corps. The Blue Jays wore camouflage of the Canadian forces' CADPAT design, even though Memorial Day is not officially a holiday in Toronto, the province of Ontario, or Canada on the last Monday in May.

The Rays wore a special cap on June 17 to mark the Orlando shooting five days earlier. They wore the cap of the Orlando Rays, the team's Southern League affiliate from 1999 to 2002. Both the Rays and Giants, their opponents, wore "ORLANDO" patches.

Teams wore uniforms with blue lettering on June 19, Father's Day.

The Royals and the Astros wore Spanish-language "Los Reales" and "Los Astros" uniforms on June 25.

The Blue Jays wore a red uniform July 1, Canada Day. The Indians, their opponents, wore a Canadian flag on their sleeve. The Blue Jays wore their red uniforms again on August 28.

All teams wore red, white and blue-themed uniforms on July 4, Independence Day in the United States.

The Reds and Brewers wore Spanish-language "Los Rojos" and "Cerveceros" uniforms August 13.

The Mariners wore Spanish-language "Marineros" uniforms September 4.

All 30 teams wore caps with American flags September 11 to mark the 15th anniversary of the terrorist attacks. The Blue Jays wore a cap with American and Canadian flags.

The Reds wore green uniforms on September 18. The uniforms had the Reds script wordmark on the front, instead of the C and the player's number. The uniforms have a shamrock on their right sleeves.

The Astros wore orange Spanish-language "Los Astros" uniforms September 25.

The Marlins all wore uniforms with José Fernández's name and number 16 on September 26 to honor him. Fernández died the previous day.

== Venues ==
This was the Atlanta Braves' final season at Turner Field, where the team played its final regular season game against the Detroit Tigers on October 2, 2016. From the 2017 Major League Baseball season onward, the Braves will play home games at SunTrust Park in Cobb County, Georgia.

The Toronto Blue Jays had a full dirt infield installed in Rogers Centre after using sliding pits throughout their history there as well as Exhibition Stadium.

== Television ==
=== National ===
==== United States ====
This was the third year of the current eight-year deals with Fox Sports, ESPN and TBS. Fox aired eight weeks of baseball on Saturday night leading up to the 2016 Major League Baseball All-Star Game, which also aired on Fox. Fox then televised Saturday afternoon games for the last four weeks of the regular season. Fox Sports 1 televised games on Tuesday nights and Saturdays, both during the afternoon and night. ESPN televised games on its flagship telecast, Sunday Night Baseball, as well as Monday and Wednesday nights. TBS televised Sunday afternoon games for the last 13 weeks of the regular season. Fox and ESPN Sunday Night Baseball telecasts will be exclusive; all other national telecasts will be subject to local blackout.

TBS will televise the American League Wild Card Game, Division Series, and Championship Series. ESPN will televise the National League Wild Card Game, Fox Sports 1 and MLB Network will televise the National League Division Series, and Fox Sports 1 will televise the National League Championship Series. The World Series will air exclusively on Fox for the 17th consecutive year.

On April 14, 2016, it was announced that 25 MLB Network Showcase games would be broadcast in 4K ultra-high definition exclusively on DirecTV in the 2016 season (subject to local blackout restrictions), beginning April 15.

On July 25, 2016, Major League Baseball Advanced Media and Twitter reached an agreement which allowed the social media platform to stream one MLB game per week. The games were blacked out in the local markets of the teams playing.

==== Canada ====
On October 5, 2015, Toronto Blue Jays owner Rogers Communications announced that all Blue Jays home games on Sportsnet during the 2016 season would be broadcast in 4K.

=== Local ===
In November 2015, after negotiations surrounding revenue sharing and infrastructural mandates (including a proposed requirement that the games only be available through the league's existing apps), Fox Sports Networks reached a three-year deal with Major League Baseball to allow in-market, authenticated online streaming for eligible pay TV subscribers via Fox Sports Go, of regional telecasts for the sixteen teams it holds rights to, beginning in the 2016 season.

== Radio ==
ESPN Radio aired its 19th season of national coverage, including Sunday Night Games, Saturday games, Opening Day and holiday games, the All-Star Game, and Home Run Derby, and the entire postseason.

=== Local ===
The Chicago White Sox moved from WSCR to Cumulus Media's WLS for the 2016 season. The Chicago Cubs concurrently moved to WSCR from its sister station WBBM, per an option in the team's contract with CBS Radio in the event WSCR lost the White Sox.

The Philadelphia Phillies saw their broadcasts move from AM to FM, going from WPHT to WIP-FM (both also owned by CBS Radio).

== Retirements ==
- Los Angeles Dodgers broadcaster Vin Scully announced in August 2015 that he will retire after the 2016 season, his 67th as play-by-play announcer for Brooklyn and Los Angeles Dodgers broadcasts.
- Chicago Cubs catcher David Ross announced that he would probably retire during a November 2015 radio interview on MLB radio network. He homered in his final major league game in the sixth inning of Game 7 of the 2016 World Series, becoming the oldest player to homer in a World Series game 7.
- San Diego Padres broadcaster Dick Enberg announced in September 2015 that he will retire as San Diego Padres broadcast play-by-play announcer after the 2016 season.
- David Ortiz announced on November 18, 2015, that he will retire at the end of the 2016 season.
- Skip Schumaker announced his retirement on March 9.
- Willie Bloomquist announced his retirement on March 11.
- Adam LaRoche announced his retirement on March 15.
- Brad Penny, who last pitched in the majors in 2014, announced his retirement on March 18.
- Rafael Soriano announced his retirement on March 20.
- Chone Figgins announced his retirement on March 21.
- Philip Humber announced his retirement on March 29.
- David Murphy announced his retirement on April 25.
- Grant Balfour announced his retirement on April 29.
- Phillippe Aumont announced his retirement on June 7.
- Mark Teixeira announced his retirement on August 5, effective at the end of the season.
- Alex Rodriguez announced his retirement on August 7, Rodriguez played his final game on August 12 at Yankee Stadium, the following day he was granted his release by the Yankees.
- Prince Fielder announced on August 10 that he was unable to continue his playing career after undergoing two neck surgeries in the past 3 years.
- Houston Astros broadcaster Bill Brown announced on September 22 that he will retire as Houston Astros broadcast play-by-play announcer after the 2016 season.
- Umpire Bob Davidson announced his retirement at the end of the 2016 MLB season.
- Umpire John Hirschbeck announced his retirement at the end of the 2016 World Series.
- Matt Thornton announced his retirement on November 8.
- Joe Thatcher announced his retirement on November 12.
- Joel Hanrahan announced his retirement on November 15.
- Matt Harrison announced his retirement on January 13, 2017.
- Umpire Jim Joyce announced his retirement on January 16, 2017.
- J. P. Arencibia announced his retirement on January 18, 2017.
- Josh Johnson announced his retirement on January 19, 2017.
- Javier López announced his retirement on February 8, 2017.
- C. J. Wilson announced his retirement on February 8, 2017.
- Randy Choate announced his retirement on February 16, 2017.
- Nick Swisher announced his retirement on February 17, 2017.
- Chris Reed announced his retirement around February 17, 2017.
- Caleb Cotham announced his retirement on March 9, 2017.
- David DeJesus announced his retirement on March 22, 2017.
- A. J. Pierzynski announced his retirement on March 28, 2017.

== Retired numbers ==
- Wade Boggs had his #26 retired by the Boston Red Sox on May 26. It is the tenth number retired by the organization.
- Pete Rose had his #14 retired by the Cincinnati Reds on June 26 as part of the Reds' Hall of Fame Ceremony. Rose was also inducted as part of the Reds' 2016 induction class. It is the tenth number retired by the Reds.
- Mike Piazza had his #31 retired by the New York Mets on July 30. It is the fourth number retired by the Mets.
- Ken Griffey Jr. had a formal retirement ceremony for his #24 by the Seattle Mariners during the pregame on August 6; the number had officially been retired as of the start of the season. It is the first number retired by the team. Griffey's number has also been retired throughout the whole Mariners minor-league organization.
- José Fernández had his #16 retired by the Miami Marlins immediately after his accidental death on September 25. In a statement from Marlins owner Jeffrey Loria, "No one will ever wear #16 ever again in the Marlins franchise." It is the second number retired by the franchise.

== Attendances ==
Club	Total attendance	Home average
Los Angeles Dodgers	3,703,312	45,720
St. Louis Cardinals	3,444,490	42,525
Toronto Blue Jays	3,392,099	41,878
San Francisco Giants	3,365,256	41,546
Chicago Cubs	3,232,420	39,906
New York Yankees	3,063,405	37,820
Los Angeles Angels	3,016,142	37,236
Boston Red Sox	2,955,434	36,487
New York Mets	2,789,602	34,440
Texas Rangers	2,710,402	33,462
Colorado Rockies	2,602,524	32,130
Kansas City Royals	2,557,712	31,577
Detroit Tigers	2,493,859	31,173
Washington Nationals	2,481,938	30,641
San Diego Padres	2,351,422	29,030
Milwaukee Brewers	2,314,614	28,575
Houston Astros	2,306,623	28,477
Seattle Mariners	2,267,928	27,999
Pittsburgh Pirates	2,249,201	27,768
Baltimore Orioles	2,172,344	26,819
Arizona Diamondbacks	2,036,216	25,138
Atlanta Braves	2,020,914	24,950
Minnesota Twins	1,963,912	24,246
Philadelphia Phillies	1,915,144	23,644
Cincinnati Reds	1,894,085	23,384
Chicago White Sox	1,746,293	21,559
Miami Marlins	1,712,417	21,405
Cleveland Indians	1,591,667	19,650
Oakland Athletics	1,521,506	18,784
Tampa Bay Rays	1,286,163	15,879

== See also ==
- 2016 in baseball
- 2016 KBO League season
- 2016 Nippon Professional Baseball season
