= Alfred Oppenheim =

Alfred Oppenheim may refer to:

- Alfred Oppenheim (chemist) (1878–1943), German chemist and gas mantle manufacturer
- Alfred Oppenheim (artist) (1873–1953), German artist
- Alfred Freiherr von Oppenheim (1934–2005), known in America as Alfred Oppenheim, German billionaire and banker
