= Gershon Ashkenazi =

Polish Talmudist

Rabbi Gershon Ashkenazi (c.1620 – 1693) was a Polish Talmudist who studied under Joel Sirkis. He was a disciple of the Maharam Shif and the Rabbi Heschel of Kraków.

During his lifetime, Ashkenazi was a recognised authority in Talmudic law. Ashkenazi authored the Sefer Avodas HaGersuhni.

Between 1649 and 1664, he served as a Rabbi in Prossnitz, Hanau, and Nikolsburg. In 1664, he moved to Vienna, where he remained until Jewish people were banished from the city in 1670. After his arrival in the city, he reached a high degree of respect in Metz, where he was commonly sought after for rituals and teaching. Ashkenazi was popular and revered amongst a large number of his pupils, notably Rabbi David Oppenheim.

Ashkenazi died on March 20, 1693, in Nikolsburg.
