= Oppenheim (disambiguation) =

Oppenheim is a small town in Germany.

Oppenheim may also refer to:

- Oppenheim, New York, U.S.
- Oppenheim (surname)
- Oppenheim family, prominent European banking family since the 18th century
- Oppenheim Architecture, architecture, planning and interior design practice

== See also ==
- Oppenheimer (disambiguation)
- Hempel-Oppenheim model
