= Peter Oppenheimer (disambiguation) =

Peter Oppenheimer (born 1963) is the former senior vice president and chief financial officer of Apple Inc.

Peter Oppenheimer may also refer to:

- Peter Oppenheimer (economist) (born 1938), English economist and fellow of Christ Church, Oxford
- Peter C. Oppenheimer, English chief global equity strategist and head of Macro Research in Europe
