= Oppenheimer (disambiguation) =

J. Robert Oppenheimer (1904–1967) was an American theoretical physicist.

Oppenheimer may also refer to:

== Arts and entertainment ==
- Oppenheimer (film), a 2023 film about the life of J. Robert Oppenheimer
- Oppenheimer (TV series), a 1980 BBC serial about J. Robert Oppenheimer
- Oppenheimer (play), a 2015 play
- Oppenheimer (band), an indie-pop electronica duo from Belfast, Northern Ireland
  - Oppenheimer (album), the band's debut album

== Businesses ==
- Oppenheimer Holdings, of Toronto, Ontario
  - Oppenheimer & Co., a global investment bank, and a division of Oppenheimer Holdings
- Oppenheimer Funds, acquired by Massachusetts Mutual Life Insurance Company, a New York mutual fund

== Science ==
- Oppenheimer (crater), a lunar impact crater
- Oppenheimer Diamond, a large yellow diamond named for Sir Ernest Oppenheimer

== Other uses ==
- Oppenheimer (surname), a surname
- Oppenheimer family, an Anglo-South African family

== See also ==
- Oppenheim (disambiguation)
- Oppy (disambiguation)
