= Conrad Westermayr =

German painter and engraver

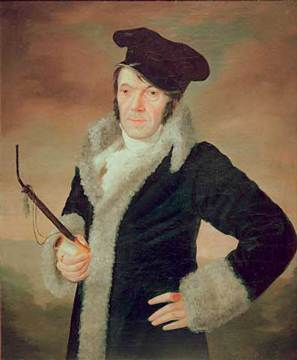
Conrad Westermayr (1817); by Moritz Daniel Oppenheim

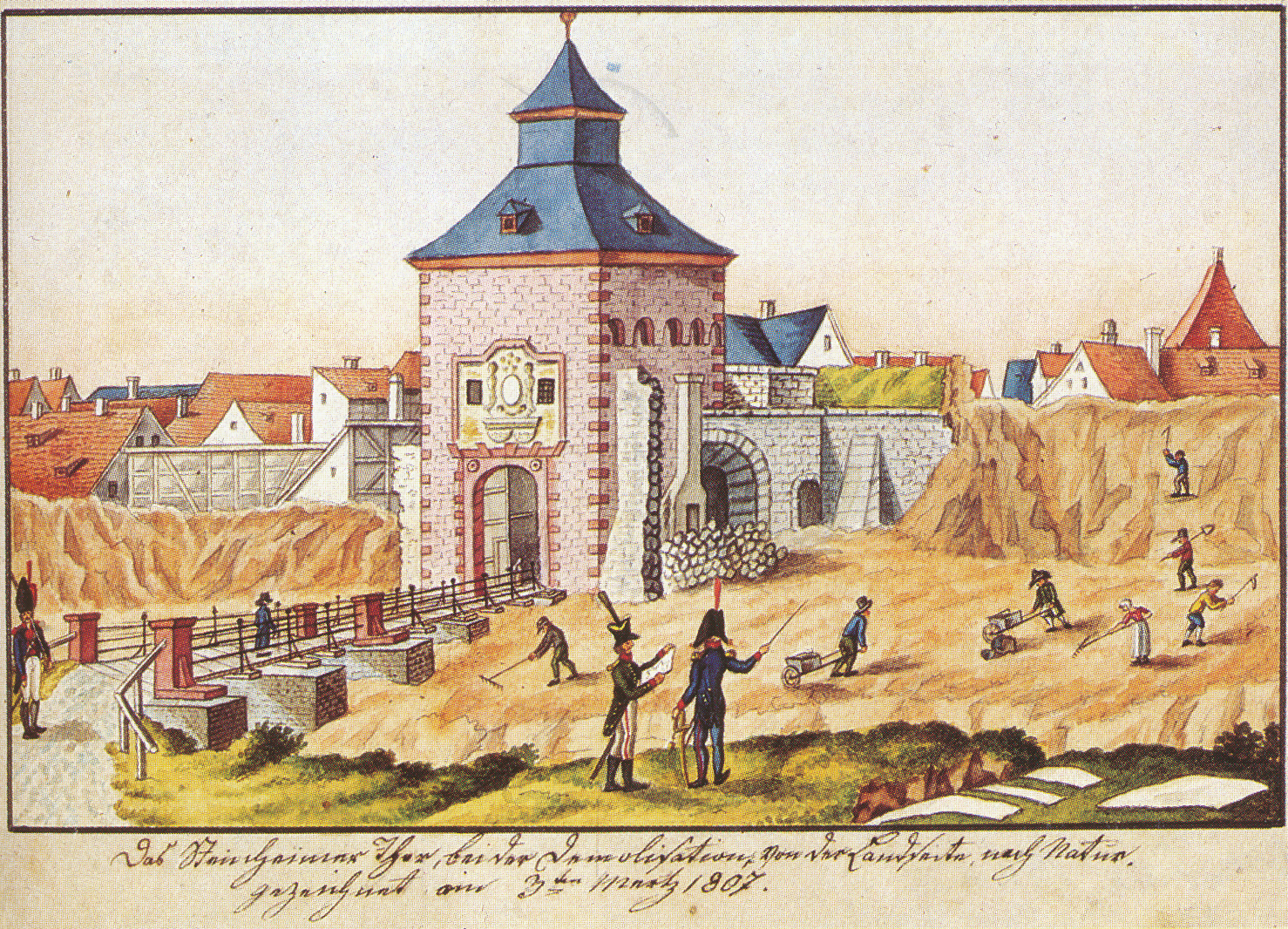
The Steinheimer Tower in Hanau, during demolition

Conrad Westermayr (30 January 1765 – 5 October 1834) was a German painter and engraver.

== Life and work ==
His father, Daniel Jacob Westermayr (1734–1788), was a goldsmith. He learned the craft from him, while attending the State Drawing Academy. At first, he focused on creating portraits, as the best source of income. In 1788, he enrolled at the Kunsthochschule Kassel, to continue his studies with one of the numerous members of the Tischbein family; most likely Johann Heinrich Tischbein. His first oil paintings were copies of the Old Masters.

After 1791, Westermayr studied in Weimar, with the copper engraver, Johann Heinrich Lips. Later, he made engraved copies of larger works by other artists, and worked for the publishing house, "Industrie-Kontor", owned by Friedrich Justin Bertuch. He went to Dresden in 1795, to further his skills in landscape painting. In 1800, he returned to Weimar and married Henriette Stötzer, an artist who had also worked for Bertuch.

Westermayr was named a professor at the Hanau Academy in 1806. The old city gates were demolished that year, and his drawings provide the only visual record of them. In 1808, he became a member of the Wetterauische Gesellschaft, a scientific society, for which he drew minerals and other natural objects. Not long after, he became the academy's Director, a position he held for the rest of his life. In 1813, he made several paintings and engravings of the Battle of Hanau.

Despite these activities, his focus was on promoting his students, one of which was Moritz Daniel Oppenheim, considered to be one of the first modern Jewish painters.

Westermayr died in 1834, at the age of sixty-nine. He and Henriette had no children. Over 500 of his plates have been preserved at the Hanau Historical Museum.

== Sources ==
- Wilhelm Grotefend (1897). "Westermayr, Konrad". Allgemeine Deutsche Biographie (in German). Vol. 42. Leipzig: Duncker & Humblot. pp. 189–191.
- Norbert Nail: "Semper lustig. Nunquam traurig: Marburger Studenten im Stammbuch des Conrad Westermayr", In: Alma Mater Philippina. Sommersemester 1994, pp. 22–25
- Georg Kaspar Nagler, "Westermayr, Conrad", In: Neues allgemeines Künstler-Lexicon, Vol.24, Schwarzenberg & Schumann, 1835, pp. 186–188 (Online)
- Ina Schneider: "Conrad und Henriette Westermayr – Leben und Arbeiten in Weimar und Hanau", In: Neues Magazin für Hanauische Geschichte, 1996, pp. 2–34
