= Hillel Oppenheimer =

Israeli professor of botany

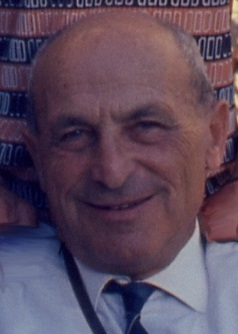
Hillel Oppenheimer

Hillel Oppenheimer (Hebrew: הלל אופנהיימר; born Heinz Reinhard Oppenheimer; 4 April 1899 – 15 June 1971), was an Israeli professor of botany. He was awarded the Israel Prize for his work in Botany in 1959.

== Biography ==
Hillel Oppenheimer was born in Berlin, Germany. His father was Franz Oppenheimer, a German-Jewish sociologist and political economist. Between 1917 and 1922, Oppenheimer studied botany at universities in Berlin, Frankfurt and Freiburg in Germany and at the University of Vienna in Austria, where he received his doctorate.

At the invitation of Selig Suskin, Oppenheimer immigrated to Mandate Palestine in 1925, and for some years was actively involved in attempts to establish new settlements and drain the swamps around Zichron Yaacov.

== Academic career ==
In 1931, he commenced working as a physiologist in the Department of Botany at the Hebrew University of Jerusalem. He helped found the Faculties of Natural Science and Agriculture at the university, and was their first lecturer on the subjects of anatomy and physiology of the plant. From 1933 to 1941, Oppenheimer headed the Department of Physiology and Genetics of the Agricultural Research Station in Rehovot. From 1941 to 1953, he was head of the department for the growth of citrus tree and agricultural botany, being appointed as a professor in 1949. Oppenheimer was dean of Faculty of Agriculture at the Hebrew University from 1953 to 1954.

== Awards and recognition ==
- In 1959, Oppenheimer was awarded the Israel Prize, in agriculture.
- A street, Hillel and Chanan Oppenheimer road In Rehovot, was named after him and his cousin, both winners of the Israel Prize.

== See also ==
- List of Israel Prize recipients
- Oppenheimer
