= Billy Eppler =

American baseball executive (born 1975)

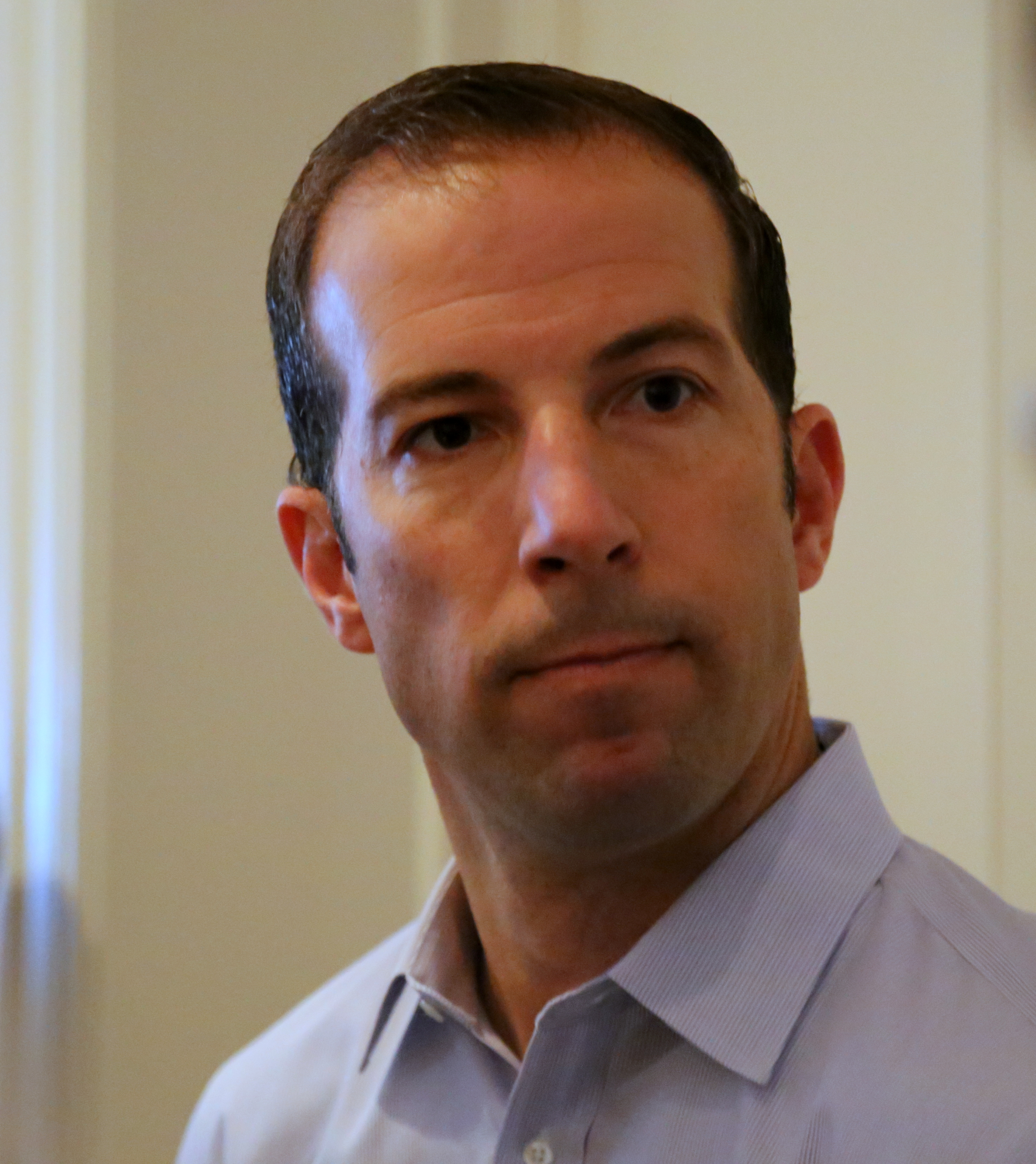
- Eppler in 2015

Milwaukee Brewers
- Born: September 16, 1975 (age 51); San Diego, California, U.S.

Teams
- As assistant general manager: New York Yankees (2012–2014); As general manager: Los Angeles Angels (2015–2020); New York Mets (2021–2023)

Billy Eppler (born September 16, 1975) is an American professional baseball executive who currently serves as a special advisor for the Milwaukee Brewers of Major League Baseball (MLB). He has previously served as the general manager of the New York Mets from 2021 to 2023. He also served as the general manager of the Los Angeles Angels from 2015 to 2020. Before that, he worked as the director of professional scouting and assistant general manager for the New York Yankees.

== Career ==
Eppler is a native of San Diego, California. He is the youngest of four children. He graduated from University of San Diego High School in 1993. He enrolled at San Diego Mesa College, where he played college baseball before earning an athletic scholarship to the University of Connecticut to play for the Connecticut Huskies baseball team. An arm injury ended his playing career. He graduated cum laude with a bachelor's degree in finance in 1998.

After graduating from Connecticut, Eppler interned with the Washington Redskins of the National Football League. The Colorado Rockies of Major League Baseball hired Eppler as a scout in 2000. After the 2004 season, he was hired to scout for the New York Yankees, working in the Tampa office run by Mark Newman and Damon Oppenheimer. When Yankees General Manager Brian Cashman was given the authority to restructure the Yankees' front office after the 2005 season, he created a professional scouting department and promoted Eppler to serve as its director. In that role, Eppler and his staff were responsible for scouting acquisitions, which led to the signings of Bartolo Colón, Eric Chavez, Cory Wade, Freddy García, Russell Martin, Andruw Jones, and Luis Ayala. He was promoted to assistant general manager during the 2011–12 offseason.

Eppler is well versed in the statistics of baseball, using them to sign Edwar Ramírez out of independent baseball. In 2011, Eppler interviewed for the general manager opening for the Los Angeles Angels of Anaheim. He was one of the finalists for the position, which went to Jerry Dipoto. In August 2014, he interviewed to be the general manager for the San Diego Padres, but the Padres hired A. J. Preller. When the Arizona Diamondbacks fired Kevin Towers as their general manager in September 2014, Eppler was one of the five candidates they identified as a potential replacement. Eppler declined to interview for the position, and the Diamondbacks chose Dave Stewart.

After the 2015 season, following Dipoto's resignation, Eppler again interviewed with the Angels for their general manager position. The Angels hired Eppler as their general manager on October 4, signing him to a four-year contract. Later in October, the Angels lost front office executives Matt Klentak, Tim Bogar, and Scott Servais, who were hired by other organizations. Eppler developed his own analytics department, and brought some executives, including special assistant Eric Chavez, to the Angels from New York. Over the next few seasons, Eppler built around Mike Trout with acquisitions of Shohei Ohtani, Justin Upton, Anthony Rendon, and Andrelton Simmons.

Following the conclusion of the 2020 season, Eppler was fired by the Angels. In his five years with the Angels, they never reached the postseason. In September 2021, William Morris Endeavor announced that Eppler would be joining their baseball division as a business partner.

On November 18, 2021, the New York Mets hired Eppler as their general manager, signing him to a four-year contract. Following the hiring of David Stearns to be the Mets' president of baseball operations, Eppler resigned from the Mets on October 5, 2023. When he resigned, he was under investigation by MLB for using the injured list for players who were not injured. On February 9, 2024, MLB announced that Eppler had been placed on the ineligible list for the 2024 MLB season, due to violating league rules regarding the injured list.

On March 2, 2025, the Milwaukee Brewers hired Eppler as a special advisor for scouting and baseball operations.

== Personal life ==
Eppler and his wife, Catherine, married in 2007 and have a son.
