= Simon Wolf Oppenheimer =

German banker, Court Jew of Hanover

Simon Wolf Oppenheimer (born 1665 - died 10 November 1726) was a German Jewish banker and Court Jew of the Electorate of Brunswick-Lüneburg in Hanover. He was the son of Samuel Oppenheimer, and was married to Frade Behrends, the granddaughter of Leffmann Behrends.
