= Matt Klentak =

American baseball executive (born 1980)

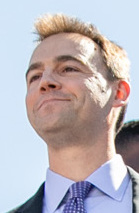
- Klentak in 2019

Milwaukee Brewers
- Advisor
- Born: August 14, 1980 (age 46); Medfield, Massachusetts, U.S.

Teams
- Philadelphia Phillies (2015–2020)

Matthew Klentak (born August 14, 1980) is an American baseball front office executive who served as the general manager of the Philadelphia Phillies of Major League Baseball from October 2015 to October 2020. He also previously served as the assistant general manager of MLB's Los Angeles Angels of Anaheim. He currently serves as a special assistant in the Brewers front office.

== Early life ==
Klentak was raised in Medfield, Massachusetts, and attended Xaverian Brothers High School in Westwood, Massachusetts, where he earned two varsity letters in baseball. He then attended Dartmouth College, where he played college baseball for the Dartmouth Big Green all four years, starting at shortstop for three years, and serving as the team captain in his senior year. Bob Whalen, Dartmouth's head coach, moved Ed Lucas from shortstop to third base so that Klentak could play shortstop. Klentak graduated from Dartmouth in 2002 with a bachelor's degree in economics.

== Baseball career ==
Klentak worked for the Colorado Rockies in their baseball operations department during the 2003 season. He then worked in Major League Baseball's Labor Relations Department for four years. He worked with Andy MacPhail, then the team president of the Baltimore Orioles, while working on the 2006 Collective Bargaining Agreement. In 2008, MacPhail hired Klentak as director of baseball operations. After the 2011 season, the Los Angeles Angels of Anaheim hired Klentak as their assistant general manager. When Jerry Dipoto, the Angels' general manager, resigned during the 2015 season, Klentak was interviewed for the position. The Angels hired Billy Eppler.

The Philadelphia Phillies, led by MacPhail as their president, interviewed Klentak for their general manager position after the 2015 season. The Phillies hired Klentak as their general manager, introducing him at a press conference on October 26, 2015. On October 3, 2020, Klentak announced that he would be stepping down as Phillies General Manager. He was replaced in the position by Sam Fuld. On January 24, 2022, the Milwaukee Brewers announced that they had hired Klentak as a special assistant in the organization.

== Personal life ==
Klentak is from Medfield, Massachusetts. His father, George, is an engineer and his mother, Josee, works as a teacher's aide. He and his wife, Lauren, met at Dartmouth and have two daughters.
