= Meir Schiff =

German rabbi and Talmud scholar

Meïr ben Jacob HaKohen Schiff, (1608–1644) (Hebrew: מאיר הכהן שיף) called the Maharam Schiff (מהר"ם שיף), was a German rabbi and Talmud scholar.

== Early life ==
Meïr Schiff was born at Frankfort-on-the-Main in 1608. His father, Jacob Schiff, was director of the yeshiva at Frankfort until his death. At the age of seventeen Meïr was called to the rabbinate of Fulda, where he had charge also of a number of pupils. There he composed, between 1627 and 1636, his commentaries, which covered the entire Talmud; but only those on Betzah, Ketubot, Gittin, Bava Metzia, and Hullin, together with fragments on Shabbat, Megillah, Bava Kamma, Bava Batra, Sanhedrin, and Zebahim, have been preserved.

== Teachings ==
Schiff, being averse to pilpul, attacked not only contemporaries, like Solomon Luria (Ket. 94), Meïr of Lublin (B. M. 61), and Samuel Edels (B. M. 50), but even Rashi (Ket. 42), Isaac b. Sheshet (B. M. 48), and Mordecai (B. M. 4). He enters at once upon the discussion of his subjects, which he treats in detail though without digression; nor does he attempt to derive his proofs from remote Talmudic passages. His explanations are often obscure on account of their extreme brevity, many sentences being incomplete. This was due to pressure of other demands on his time, since he was actively interested in the affairs of his community. He did not write his commentaries in note-books, but on loose leaves of paper. He refers only to one of the different kinds of pilpul current in his time, namely, the so-called "Norburger."

Apart from his halakic commentaries, Schiff also composed sermons on the Pentateuch. In these he appears as an opponent of simple exegesis. He says, for instance, that Jacob must have been familiar with the explanation of Gen. xxv. 33 given by Rashi (B. Ḳ., end). Of the sermons only a fragment on Deut. iv. has been preserved. A mnemonic index to the Bible and the Talmud by him is also extant. In 1636 he removed to Schmalkalden; he was called to the rabbinate of Prague shortly before his death.

On his death-bed Schiff is said to have called his daughter Henlah and told her to keep all his works in a box until one of his younger relatives should be able to study and publish them. Henlah sent the box containing the works to a strange house, where they became moth-eaten, and some of them were stolen; so that her son, Michael Stein, came into possession of only a remnant of them, which he finally published, probably in 1737, at Homburgvor-der-Höhe under the title Ḥiddushe Halakot. A second edition appeared there in 1757; and both were full of misprints. The first revised edition was published by Mordecai Markus of Polozk in 1810. It was seen asa been the model for Talmudic study, and a copy was often given as a prize to students who have distinguished themselves in the study of Ḥiddushim. Eventually, Schiff's notes were printed in the back of the standard edition Talmud, along with the super commentary of Mordechai Mardush of Paritsk.

Most of Schiff's notes on the four Ṭurim, as well as his cabalistic works and Talmudic decisions, were destroyed during the conflagration at Frankfort-on-the-Main in 1711.

He died about 1644 at Prague.

== Bibliography ==
- Fraenkel, in Orient, Lit. vi. 827-830;
- S. Horodetzki, in Ha-Goren, 1899, ii. 58-66;
- Azulai, Shem ha-Gedolim, p. 63;
- Wolf, Bibl. Hebr. iii. 1398;
- Steinschneider, Cat. Bodl. Col. 1715;
- Benjacob, Oẓar ha-Sefarim, p. 179.
