= Moritz Daniel Oppenheim =

German artist (1800–1882)

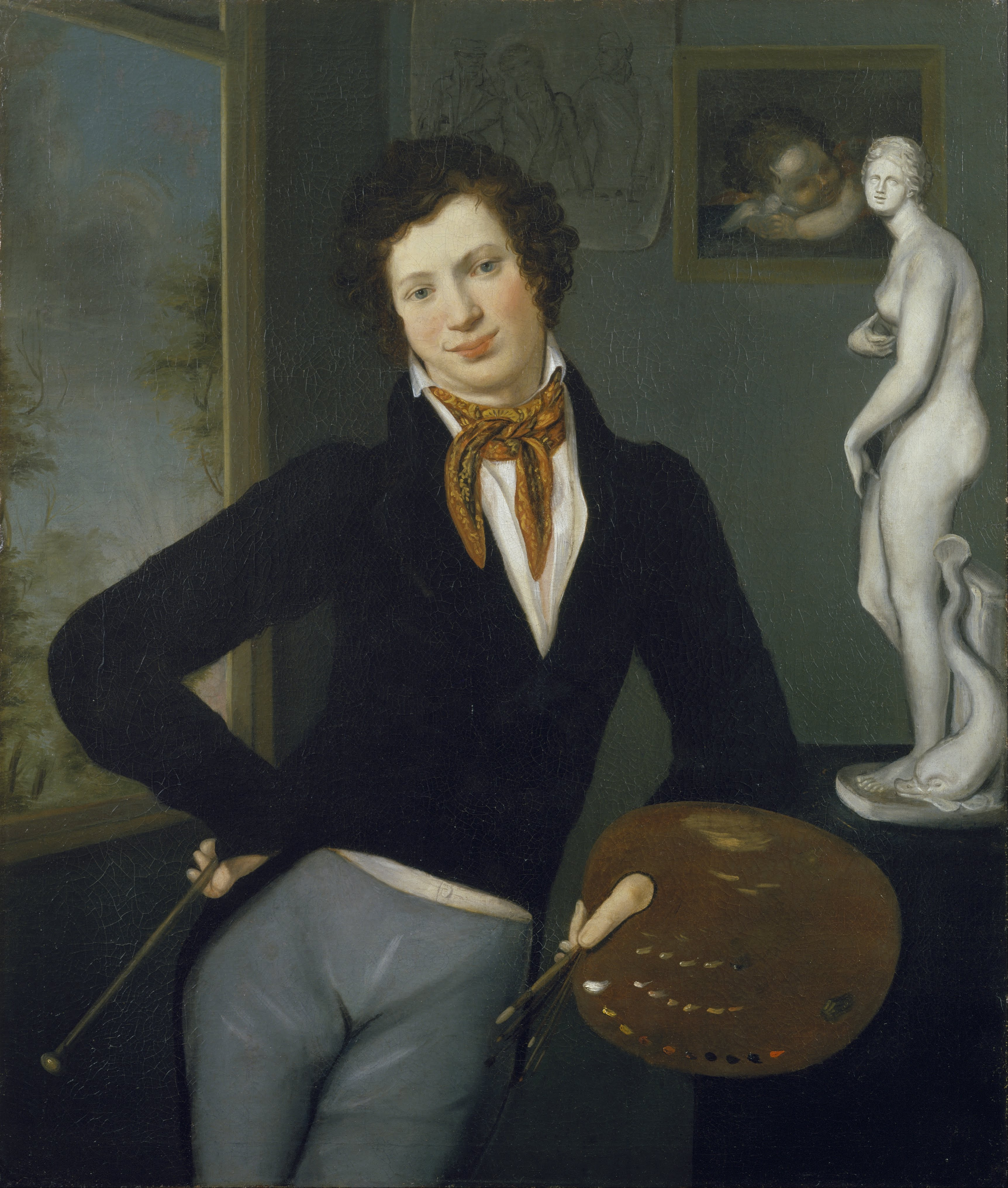
- Self portrait c. 1815
- Born: 7 January 1800; Hanau, Germany
- Died: 26 February 1882 (aged 82); Frankfurt am Main, Germany
- Education: Conrad Westermayr, Jean-Baptiste Regnault, Bertel Thorwaldsen, Barthold Georg Niebuhr, Friedrich Overbeck
- Known for: Painting
- Notable work: Return of the Jewish Volunteer, The Kidnapping of Edgardo Mortara, Mignon and the Harper, Italian Genre Scene, Confirmation, Sabbath Blessing

Moritz Daniel Oppenheim (7 January 1800 – 26 February 1882) was a German painter who is often regarded as the first Jewish painter of the modern era. His work was influenced by his cultural and religious roots at a time when many of his German Jewish contemporaries chose to convert to Christianity. Oppenheim is considered by the scholar Ismar Schorsch to be in sympathy with the ideals of the Wissenschaft des Judentums movement, because he remained "fair to the present" without denying his past.

== Biography ==
Oppenheim was born to Jewish parents at Hanau, Germany in 1800; he died at Frankfurt am Main in 1882. He received his first lessons in painting from Conrad Westermayr, in Hanau, and entered the Munich Academy of Arts at the age of seventeen. Later he visited Paris, where Jean-Baptiste Regnault became his teacher, and then went to Rome, where he studied with Bertel Thorwaldsen, Barthold Georg Niebuhr, and Johann Friedrich Overbeck. There he studied the life of the Jewish ghetto and made sketches of the various phases of its domestic and religious life, in preparation for several large canvases which he painted upon his return to Germany.

In 1825 he settled at Frankfurt, and shortly after exhibited his painting David Playing Before Saul, to see which a great number of admirers from all parts of Europe visited his studio. In 1832, at the instance of Goethe, Charles Frederick, Grand Duke of Saxe-Weimar-Eisenach conferred upon him the honorary title of professor. Oppenheim was commissioned to paint several portraits of prominent members of the Rothschild banking dynasty. Oppenheim also portrayed his grandson Alfred Oppenheim, who became also a well known artist.

Oppenheim taught at the Städel Institute, where Julius Bien was one of his students.

== Selected works ==
Oppenheim's studies of Jewish life, his pictures of Emperor Joseph II and Moses Mendelssohn, and his portraits from life of Ludwig Börne and other contemporary Jewish notables, established his reputation as one of the foremost Jewish artists of the nineteenth century. His Return of the Jewish Volunteer is among his most famous works and was frequently reproduced; others include Mignon and the Harper, Italian Genre Scene, Confirmation, and Sabbath Blessing. All these are characteristic examples of his power of conception and skill at grouping.

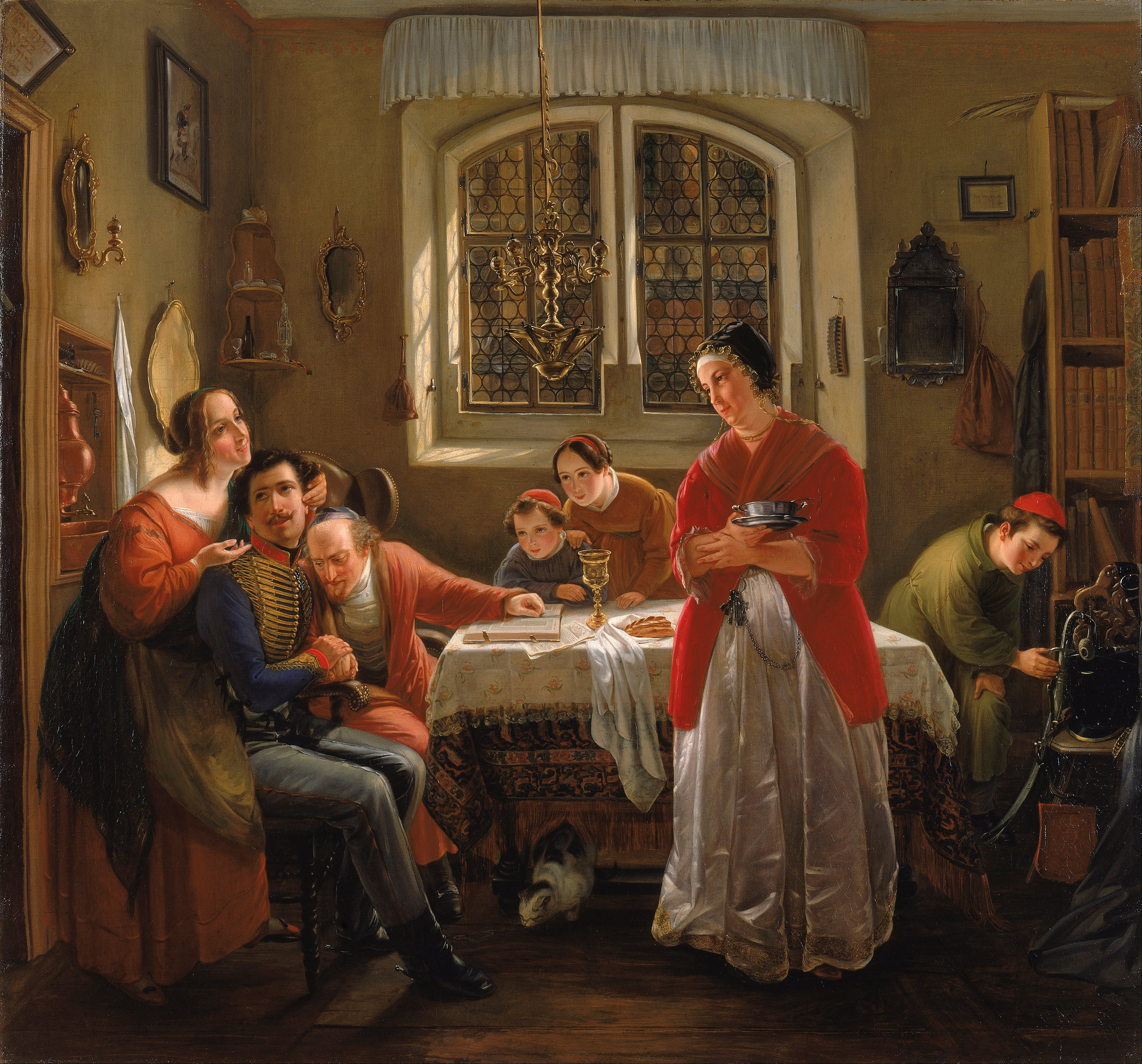
The Return of the Jewish Volunteer from the Wars of Liberation to His Family Still Living According to Old Customs (1833–34)

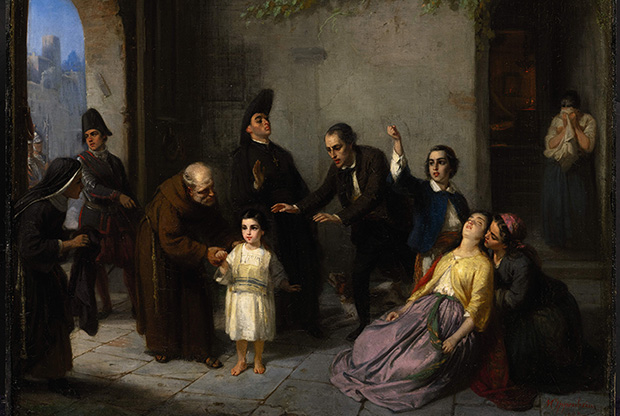
The Kidnapping of Edgardo Mortara (1862)

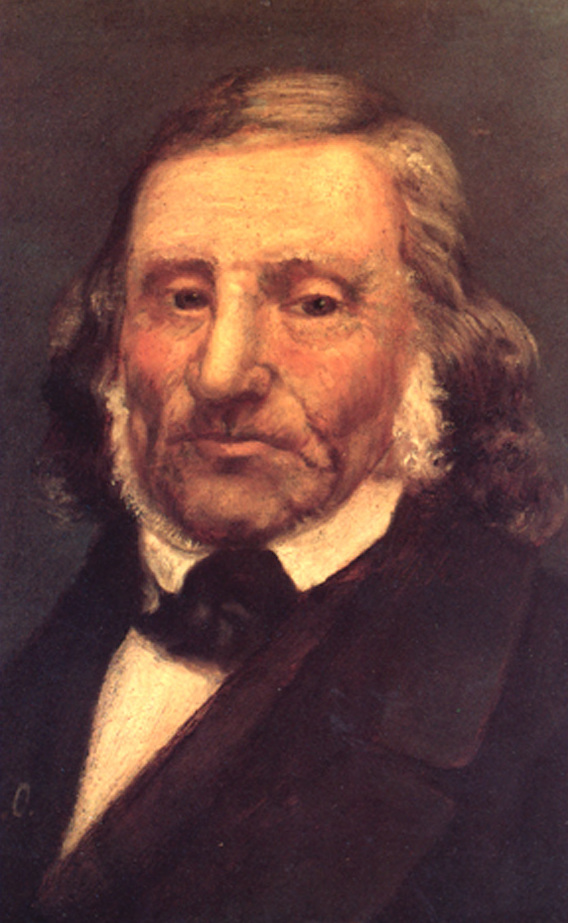
Portrait of Leopold Zunz

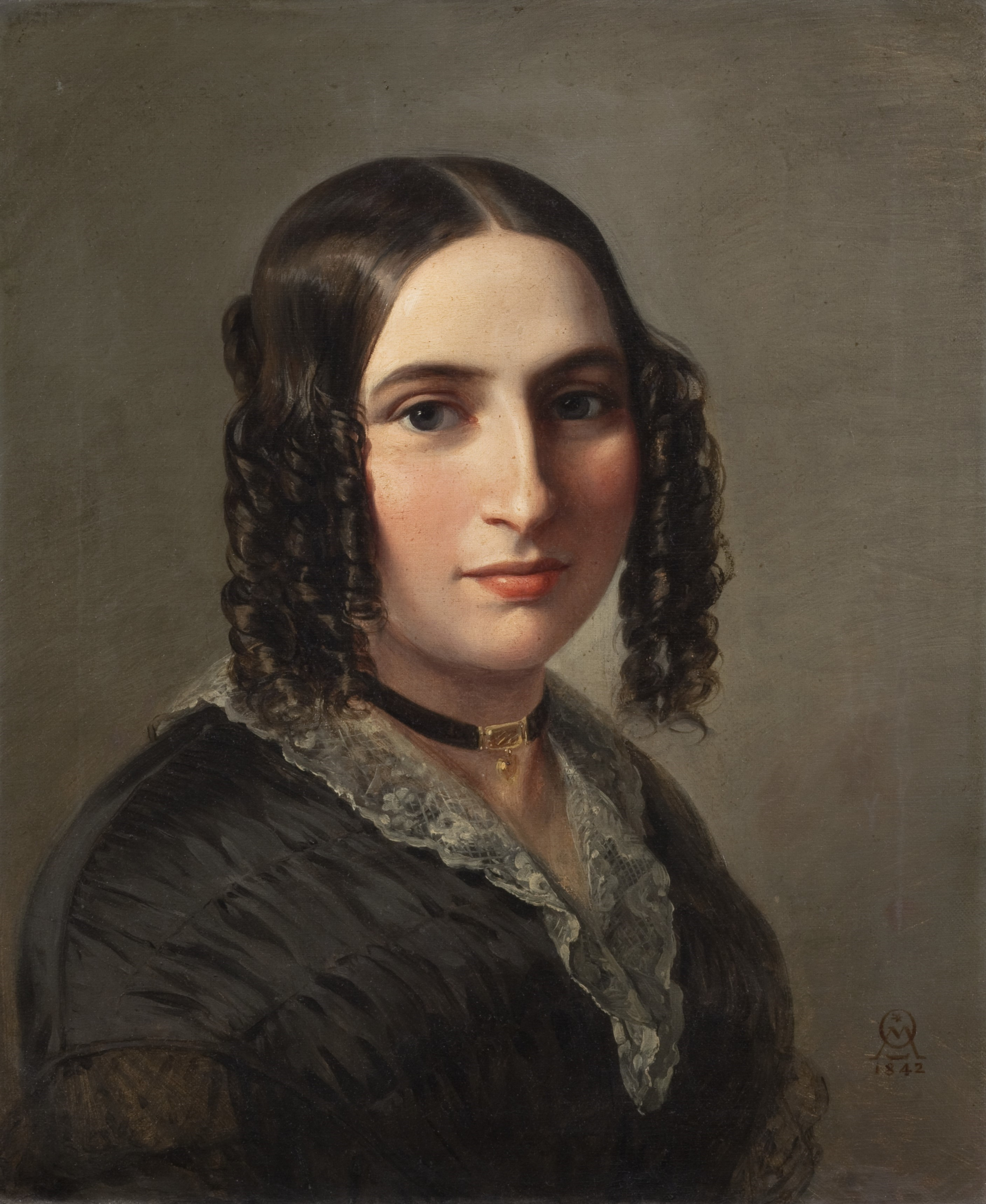
Portrait of Fanny Hensel
