= Avrohom Chaim Oppenheim =

Rabbi in Pécs, Hungary (c. 1796–1824)

Rabbi Avrohom Chaim Oppenheim

Personal life
- Born: 1796?
- Died: 1824? Pécs, Hungary
- Notable work(s): Har Ebel, Nishmas Chayim
- Known for: Author of Har Ebel and Nishmas Chayim
- Occupation: Rabbi

Religious life
- Religion: Judaism

Senior posting
- Post: Rabbi of Pécs

Rabbi Avrohom Chaim Oppenheim (Yiddish: אַבְרָהָם חַיִּים אָפּענהײַם, Hebrew: אַבְרָהָם חַיִּים אופנהיים; 1796? – 1824?) was a rabbi at Pécs, Hungary, where he died at the age of 28, before 1825.

He was the author of Har Ebel (Lemberg, 1824), ritual regulations on visiting the sick, mourning customs, etc., and of a treatise entitled Nishmas Chayim (Dyhernfurth, 1829), on the immortality of the soul, both of which were published by his relative Simon Oppenheim, dayan in Budapest.
