= Samuel Oppenheimer =

German-Jewish banker and diplomat (1630–1703)

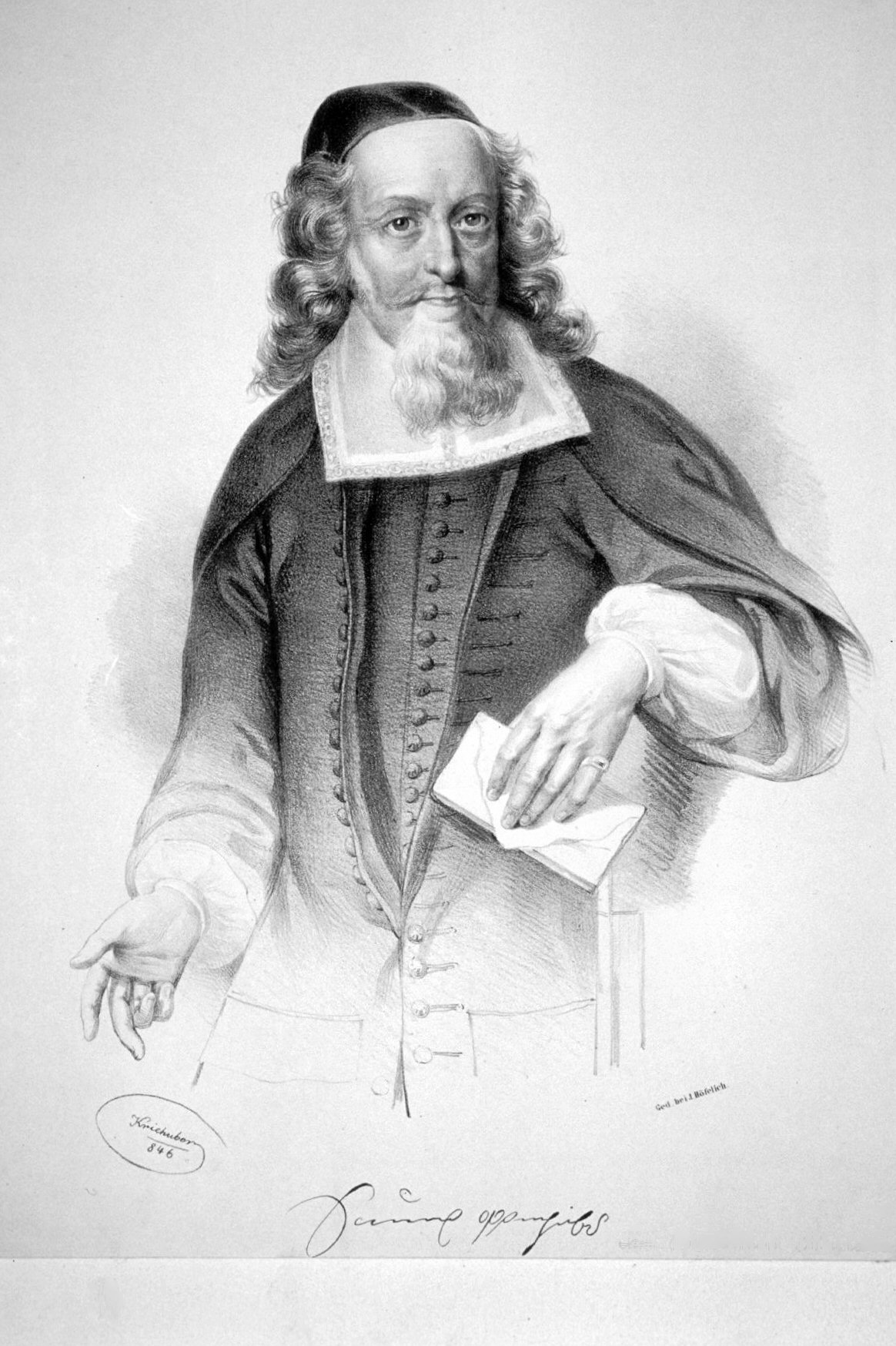
- Samuel Wolf Oppenheimer by Josef Kriehuber
- Born: 21 June 1630; Heidelberg, Holy Roman Empire
- Died: 3 May 1703 (aged 72); Vienna, Holy Roman Empire
- Occupation: Court Jew
- Children: Simon Wolf Oppenheimer
- Parents: Simeon Oppenheimer (father); Edel Drach (mother)
- Relatives: David Oppenheim (nephew)

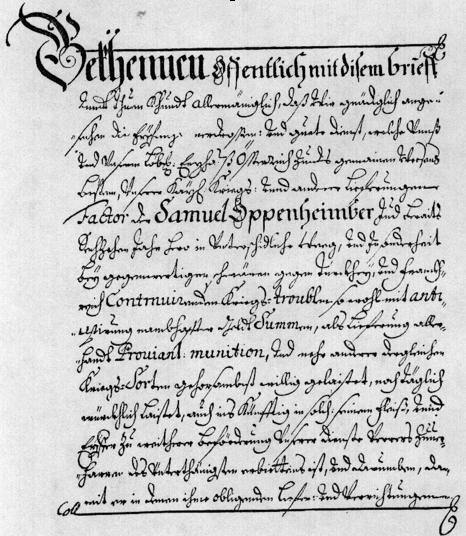
Privileges for Samuel Oppenheimer, 1691

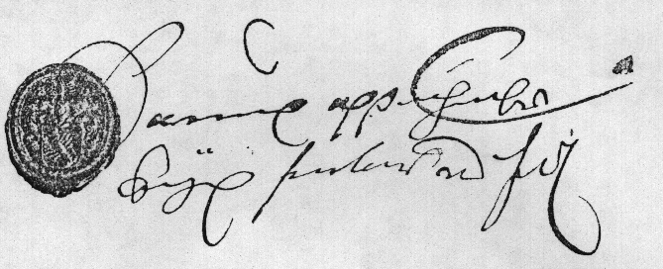
Samuel Oppenheimer's seal and signature

Samuel Oppenheimer (21 June 1630 – 3 May 1703) was an Ashkenazi Jewish banker, imperial court diplomat, factor, and military supplier for the Holy Roman Emperor. He enjoyed the special favor of Emperor Leopold I, to whom he advanced considerable sums of money for the Great Turkish War. Prince Eugene of Savoy brought him a large number of valuable Hebrew manuscripts from Turkey, which became the nucleus of the famous David Oppenheim Library, now part of the Bodleian Library at Oxford.

Although the Jews had been recently expelled from Vienna in 1670, the emperor permitted Oppenheimer to settle there, together with his "Gesinde", his followers, who included a number of Jewish families. He even received the privilege of building a mansion in the heart of Vienna. He was appointed "Oberfaktor" and court Jew at the recommendation of Margrave Ludwig of Baden, the imperial general in Hungary, to whom he had advanced 100,000 gulden for war expenses. He also enabled Prince Eugene to provide medical attendance for the army during the Turkish war. About the year 1700, a riot broke out, possibly sanctioned by the royal court, to persuade Oppenheimer to relieve the court's debt. During the riot, houses were sacked and property looted, including Oppenheimer's. As a result, one man was hanged for sacking Oppenheimer's house and others were imprisoned for participating in the disturbance.

Oppenheimer took steps to suppress the antisemitic Entdecktes Judenthum (Judaism Unmasked) treatise by spending large sums of money to win the court and the Jesuits to the side of the Jews. As a result, an imperial edict was issued forbidding circulation of the author, Eisenmenger's, work. Oppenheimer was employed also by the emperor in political missions which were often of a delicate nature.

When Oppenheimer died, the state refused to honor its debts to his heir Emanuel and had his firm declared bankrupt. His death brought deep financial crisis to the state; it experienced great difficulty in securing the credit necessary to meet its needs. Emanuel appealed to European rulers to whom the state owed money and who intervened on his behalf. After deliberate procrastination, the state refused Emanuel's demand for 6 million florins and instead demanded 4 million florins from him. This amount was based on a sum which (with compound interest), according to the state, Oppenheimer had allegedly obtained by fraud at the beginning of his career. Emanuel died in 1721 and the Oppenheimer estate was auctioned off in 1763. Although Oppenheimer was not himself learned, he was a benefactor on a scale hitherto unknown, building many synagogues and yeshivot and supporting their scholars. He also paid ransom for the return of Jews captured during the Turkish wars and supported as well R. Judah he-Hasid's voyage to Eretz Israel in 1700. Known as Judenkaiser by his contemporaries, he was a man whose complex personality, a mixture of pride and reserve, defied historical analysis. Twenty years after his death, it was estimated that more than 100 persons held residence in Vienna by virtue of their being included in Oppenheimer's privileges.

Oppenheimer was buried in the Rossauer Cemetery, the oldest Jewish cemetery in Vienna (Seegasse 9). Stones in the cemetery were buried during WWII for protection. Many were recovered and the cemetery was restored in the 1980s. One half of Samuel Oppenheimer's tombstone as well as the lower part of the second half were recovered during excavations in the cemetery in 2008 and restored to its original location, as were the tombstones of several of his descendants. A photograph taken before the war reveals the elaborate inscriptions on his tombstone.

One of Oppenheimer's sons, Simon Wolf Oppenheimer, established a banking house in Hanover. Simon Wolff's son, Jakob Wolf Oppenheimer continued the family banking house. It was there, from 1757 to 1763, that Mayer Amschel Rothschild apprenticed and learned the banking business that would become synonymous with that family name. Oppenheimer's descendants include the composer Felix Mendelssohn.
