= Alfred Oppenheim (artist) =

German painter

Alfred Nathaniel Oppenheim (born July 7, 1873, in Frankfurt am Main, † July 14, 1953 London) was a German artist.

== Life ==
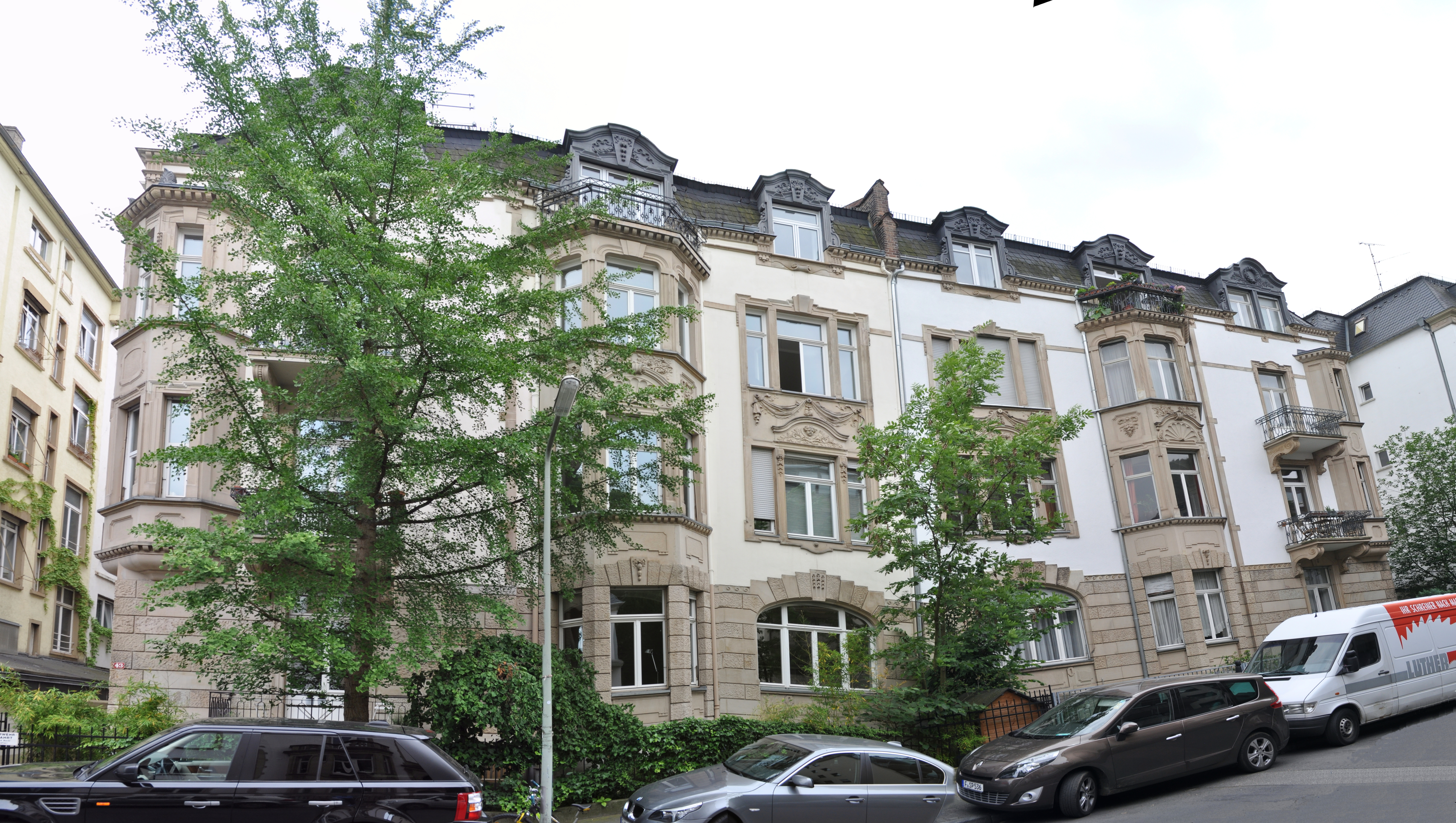
Alfred Oppenheim lived in the Eppsteiner Str. 45 (house on the left) in Frankfurt

Alfred Nathaniel Oppenheim was the grandson of the painter Moritz Oppenheim. The grandfather portrayed the three-year-old grandson in 1876 with the a figure of Struwwelpeter in his hand. Oppenheim studied at the Städelschule in Frankfurt and from 24 April 1894 at the Academy in Munich. Then he went to Paris and returned in 1900 to Frankfurt. In addition to his work as a painter, he also worked as a bijoutier of arts and crafts and explored as one of the first East Asian art. In 1924 he wrote the book Memories, which was dedicated to his grandfather. His own art collection included 19th century French art and Asian art. In 1939 he emigrated to London. The "aryanization" of his collection was carried out in 1943 by Ernst Holzinger, the director of the Städel Museum, who did not auction them, but sought to incorporate them into the city's possessions. When the city returning the collection, Oppenheim donated two of his own works to the Städel to thank for saving the collection.

In 2009, Deutsche Post issued a stamp with Oppenheim's poster motif for the International Airship Exhibition in Frankfurt 1909 (ILA). Displays of his former art collection were shown in 2018 in the Museum der Weltkulturen as a symbol of Nazi art robbery.

== Work ==
Although Alfred Oppenheim was successful as an artist, for example as a portraitist of the Frankfurt bourgeoisie, he had further activities. Educated in Paris as a jeweler, he worked in the style of French Art Nouveau, which was an exception in Germany at that time, although he is more associated with German impressionism.
