= Leffmann Behrends =

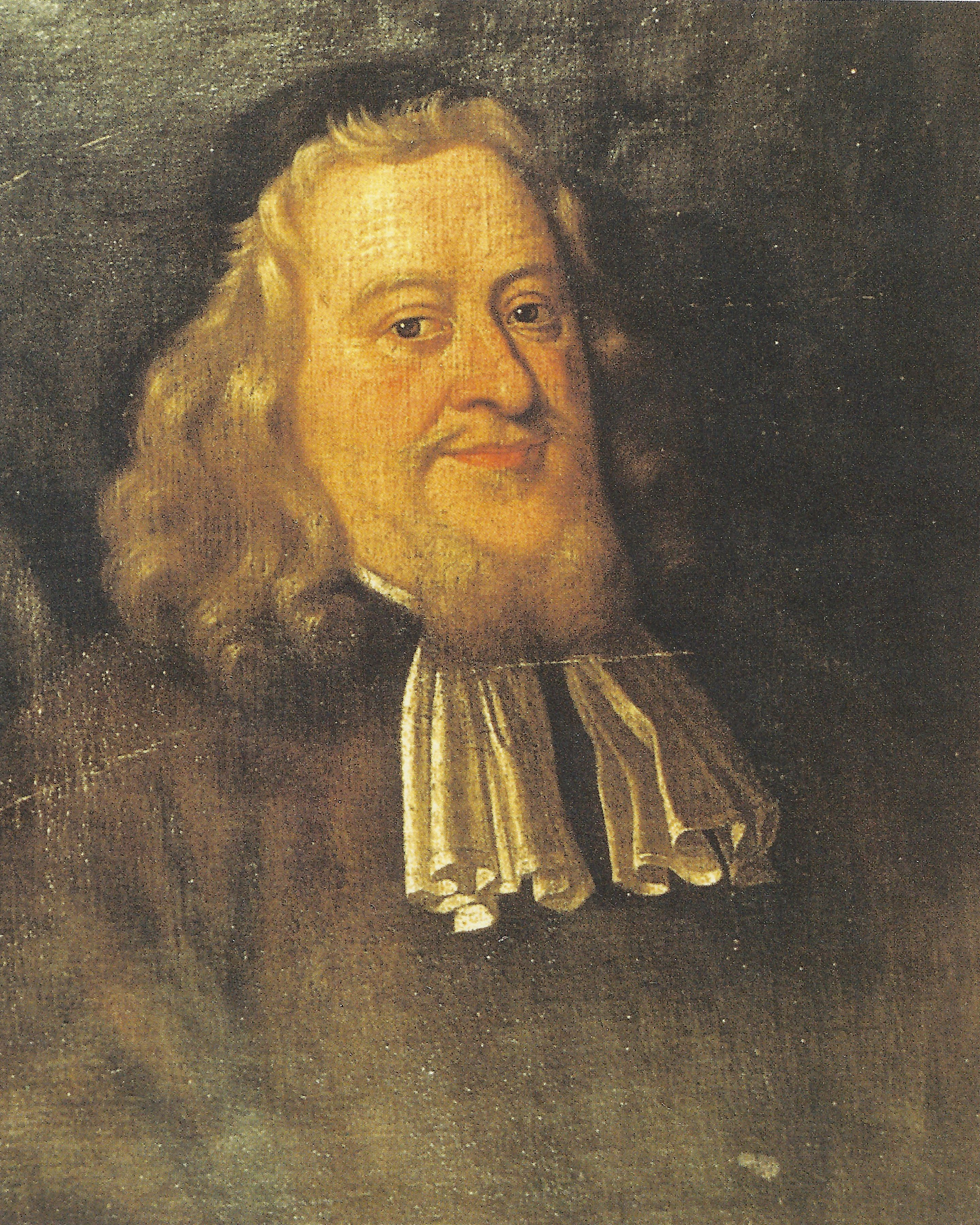
- Born: 1634
- Died: 1 January 1714 (aged 79–80)
- Occupation: Merchant

Leffmann Behrends or Liepmann Cohen (born: Elieser (Ezechiel) Lippmann ben Issachar Hakohen; c. 1630 – January 1, 1714, in Hanover) was the German-Jewish financial agent of the dukes and princes of Hanover, notably Ernest Augustus. He is considered "one of the most important court Jews in northern Germany".

== Biography ==
Leffmann Behrends' honorable position is lauded by Mannasseh ben Israel in his Hope of Israel. Behrends frequently used his influence in favor of his coreligionists. His father, Issachar Bärmann by name (died August 23, 1675), was the son of the Talmudic scholar Isaac Cohen of Borkum; and the name "Behrends" was adopted by Liepmann in honor of his father. His first wife, Jente (died 1695), was a daughter of Joseph Hameln, president of the congregation; his second, Feile (died 1727), a daughter of Judah Selkele Dilmann. Liepmann had the following children by his first marriage: Naphtali Hirz (died 1709), who became president of the congregation; Moses Jacob (died 1697), praised as a Talmudic scholar and philanthropist; Gumpert and Isaac, who, in 1721, were accused of an attempt at fraudulent bankruptcy, in consequence of which they were compelled to leave Hanover (1726). Behrends' daughter Genendel became the wife of the chief rabbi of Prague, David Oppenheim. She died at Hanover June 13, 1712.

Behrends' services as president of the congregation, in his endeavors to preserve the congregational cemetery, and to secure a special rabbinate and other privileges for Hanover, were valuable in the extreme. In 1683 Duke Rudolph August appointed him chief supervisor of the bleacheries of his community in the Harz. He stood in close relation to a number of princes, assisted Talmudic scholars, and established a bet ha-midrash in his own house. The library of his son-in-law David Oppenheimer, which he had himself enlarged, and which his son-in-law, owing to censorship and other reasons, did not wish to keep at Prague, was removed by Behrends to Hanover, thus enabling the pastor Johann Christoph Wolf of Hamburg to avail himself of it in preparing the Bibliotheca Hebræa. Together with his son Naphtali Hirz, Liepmann in 1703 had a new synagogue erected upon the site of the old one, which, constructed by order of the duke of Hanover in 1609, had been torn down four years after its erection. The fate of Liepmann's two sons Gumbert and Isaac is related in a family megillah, published by Jost in the second volume of the Jahrbuch für die Geschichte der Juden.
