= Alfred Oppenheim (chemist) =

German chemist and gas mantle manufacturer (1878–1943)

Alfred Oppenheim (3 November 1878 in Berlin – 14 May 1943 in Berlin) was a German chemist and gas mantle manufacturer.

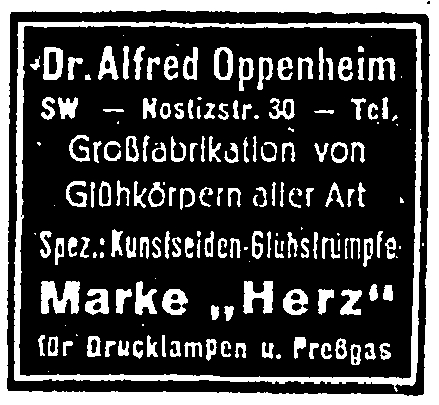
Advertising of the Berlin company Dr. Alfred Oppenheim.

== Life and work ==
=== Family ===
Oppenheim's father Adolph (1839–1913) worked as a merchant in Berlin during the German Empire. His mother Johanna, née Goldstandt (1851–1920), came from a wealthy family in Löbau. In 1919 Alfred Oppenheim married Frieda Gehrmann (*1896), 1930 his daughter Ilse Lore was born.

=== Education ===
After preschool education Oppenheim attended the Köllnische Gymnasium in Berlin (1887–1896). Right after his Abitur he studied at the Technische Hochschule in Charlottenburg [(now Technische Universität Berlin), at the Bergakademie Berlin, and at the Humboldt University of Berlin Chemistry, Physics, Botany, Bacteriology, Mineralogy, and Philosophy. During this time Blasius, Dilthey, Finkener, Hermann Emil Fischer, Gabriel, Günther, Jacobus Henricus van 't Hoff, Jahn, Klein, Adolf Lasson, Ernst Pringsheim Sr., Rosenheim, Warburg, Wichelhaus und Witt were among his docents.

Oppenheim took his final doctoral examination in Berlin. Simon Schwendener did the examination in Botany, Max Planck in Physics, Wilhelm Dilthey in Philosophy, and Siegmund Gabriel in Chemistry. In 1900 he published his thesis Ueber ß-Benzoylisobuttersäure und einige zugehörige Pyridazinderivate. A review of his dissertation was published in the Chemisches Zentralblatt Oppenheim itself commented his thesis in a contribution for the well-known Berichte der deutschen chemischen Gesellschaft.

=== Chemist and Manufacturer ===
==== Richard Feuer & Co. ====
After his graduation Oppenheim worked as an analyst in gas mantle factories. Since 1901 he worked for a chemical company in Berlin called Richard Feuer & Co., later part of the Auergesellschaft. One year later, he was appointed director of operations.

==== Allgemeine Glühlichtwerke Dr. Alfred Oppenheim ====
In 1903 Oppenheim founded his first own company called Allgemeine Glühlichtwerke Dr. Alfred Oppenheim & Co. G.m.b.H., in which he shared the management with Julius and Rosa Rosenfeld. The company soon had 300 employees and produced about 30,000 gas mantles a day.

==== Aktien-Gesellschaft für Gasglühlicht ====
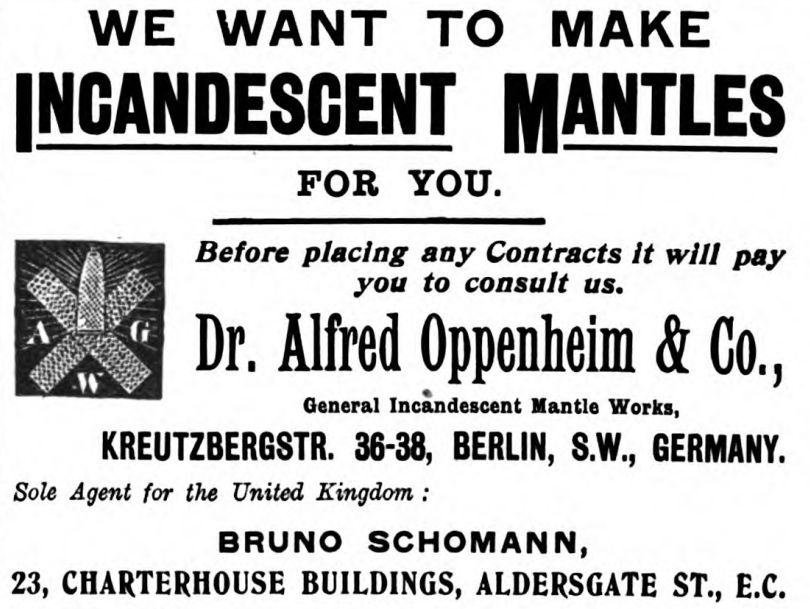
Advertising of the Berlin company Dr. Alfred Oppenheim from 1905.

Due to the high competition pressure, the Allgemeine Glühlichtwerke and similar companies merged to the Aktien-Gesellschaft für Gasglühlicht in 1905. Oppenheim was member of the managing board next to Alfred Salomon, Julius Janz, Fritz Saulmann, and Julius Norden.

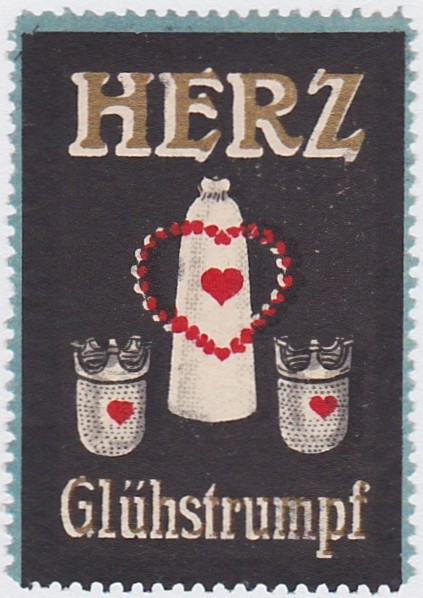
Poster stamp of the Berlin company Dr. Alfred Oppenheim, advertising for a gas mantle called "Herz" ("Heart").

==== Factory and Laboratory Dr. Alfred Oppenheim ====
After finishing his work for the joint-stock company, he founded (1910/1911), again trading under its own name, another factory called Dr. Alfred Oppenheim, which was connected with a chemical laboratory. The company mainly supplied government agencies and was well known for its railway lighting products. Mid-1930s there were about 100 people employed. The company's focus was the manufacture of gas mantles. The best-known product was a trademark called Herz (Heart), that was produced in different versions. Further lamps had proprietary names such as Edelstein (Jewel), Topas (Topaz), and Veilchen (Viola). But also chemical and pharmaceutical products were manufactured, for example Self-filtering Tablets.

==== Takeover of the Erste Rixdorfer Glühkörper-Fabrik Alschweig & Co. ====
In 1922 Oppenheim took over a company called Erste Rixdorfer Glühkörper-Fabrik Alschweig & Co., which had been founded ten years ago. As well as his own company, it was specialized in chemical products and gas mantles.

==== Author ====
Oppenheim was not only an entrepreneur, but also active in journalism. For many years, he was listed as an employee of a trade magazine for the lighting industry called Licht und Lampe (Light and Lamp).

=== Surveyor and Association Work ===
==== Hansabund ====
In 1909 Oppenheim was among the founders of the liberal Hansabund. The union was an economic advocacy for German merchants and industrialists with about 200,000 members (1913). Oppenheim was presidium member of this association as well as chairman of the local group for Greater Berlin.

==== Verband unabhängiger Glühkörperfabrikanten (Association of Independent Gas Mantle Manufacturers) ====
1912 Oppenheim was among the founding leaders of the Verband unabhängiger Glühkörperfabrikanten, which he directed and chaired until the end of the Weimar Republic. From the beginning, the union was well accepted and dealt with all relevant issues of the gas mantle industry. Initially, the focus was on the improvement of purchasing conditions for association members. Above all, the association had the goal to counter the lighting industry monopoly under the leadership of the Auergesellschaft. In the aftermath of World War I the association addressed the revival of the export business as well as questions concerning the regulation of workers and employees.

==== Sworn Expert ====
Since July 1921, Oppenheim worked as publicly appointed and sworn expert for gas mantles and gas burners. In addition, he was an expert working for the Berlin Kammergericht and for the Berlin Land Court's jurisdictional areas I, II and III.

=== Art Lover and Collector ===
At the beginning of the 20th century, Oppenheim gave concerts with pieces by Johann Sebastian Bach, Alexandre Guilmant, Jules Mouquet und César Franck in his private apartment. He played on an Art Harmonium that came from the company of his friend Alphonse Mustel (1873-1936). As Oppenheim was a successful entrepreneur, he could follow his passion as a collector of art and books. He had a preference for paintings of the Dutch Golden Age. The art historian and specialist in Dutch painting, Max Jakob Friedländer, advised him to build his collection with works by Thomas Wijck, Adriaen van de Venne and Jan Steen. After the Nazis seized power, Oppenheim's collection was disbanded and looted. Parts of it went on sale, parts disappeared in foreign ownership.

=== The end ===
After his marriage in 1919, Oppenheim officially withdrew from Judaism. This did not prevent the Nazi rulers to stop his jewish business in the context of the Aryanization. The company Dr. Alfred Oppenheim ceased to exist at the end of 1939. The next year, the liquidation of the Erste Rixdorfer Glühkörper-Fabrik Alschweig & Co. was completed. In 1940 - under massive pressure from the Nazis - the so-called miscegenation with his Protestant wife Frieda was annulled. In the final years of his life, Oppenheim was forced to Unfree labour in a Berlin chemical factory. He died in the Jewish Hospital in Berlin and was buried in the Weißensee Cemetery on 20 May 1943.

== Patents and utility model ==
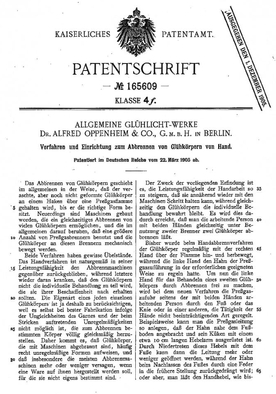
Part from patent no. 165609.

- Kaiserliches Patentamt, patent no. 153758: Verfahren, Glühstrümpfe versandfähig zu machen. class 4f, patented on 14 December 1902, published on 28 September 1904, inventors: Alfred Oppenheim, Richard Feuer (1902/1903 the patent was also granted under no. 27821 in Great Britain as well as 1903 under no. 332223 in France.)
- Kaiserliches Patentamt, utility model DRGM no. 242235: Verpackungshülse für Glühkörper, bei der beide Deckel durch einen gemeinsamen Schutzstreifen gleichzeitig festgehalten werden. class 81c, application on 14 January 1905, applicant: Allgemeine Glühlicht-Werke Dr. Alfred Oppenheim & Co., G.m.b.H.
- Kaiserliches Patentamt, patent no. 165609: Verfahren und Einrichtung zum Abbrennen von Glühkörpern von Hand. class 4f, patented on 22 March 1905, published on 1 December 1905, applicant: Allgemeine Glühlicht-Werke Dr. Alfred Oppenheim & Co., G.m.b.H.
- Deutsches Reich, Reichspatentamt, patent no. 499812: Verfahren zur Formung von Glühstrümpfen. class 4f, group 5, O 17802 VI/4f, patented on 8 December 1928, published on 16. June 1930, inventor: Alfred Oppenheim.

== Secondary literature ==
- C. Richard Böhm: Die Fabrikation der Glühkörper für Gasglühlicht. Ein Lehr- und Handbuch aus der Praxis für die Praxis. Halle 1910.
- Jacques Goldberg: 25 Jahre Gasglühlicht! Dr. Alfred Oppenheims 25jähriges Geschäftsjubiläum und 50. Geburtstag. In: Licht und Lampe, no. 12, 1928.
- Reichshandbuch der deutschen Gesellschaft. Das Handbuch der Persönlichkeiten in Wort und Bild. Vol. 2, Berlin 1931, p. 1360–1361.
- Georg Wenzel: Deutscher Wirtschaftsführer. Lebensgänge deutscher Wirtschaftspersönlichkeiten. Hamburg 1929, 1644.
