= David Oppenheim (rabbi) =

Rabbi in Prague (1664–1736)

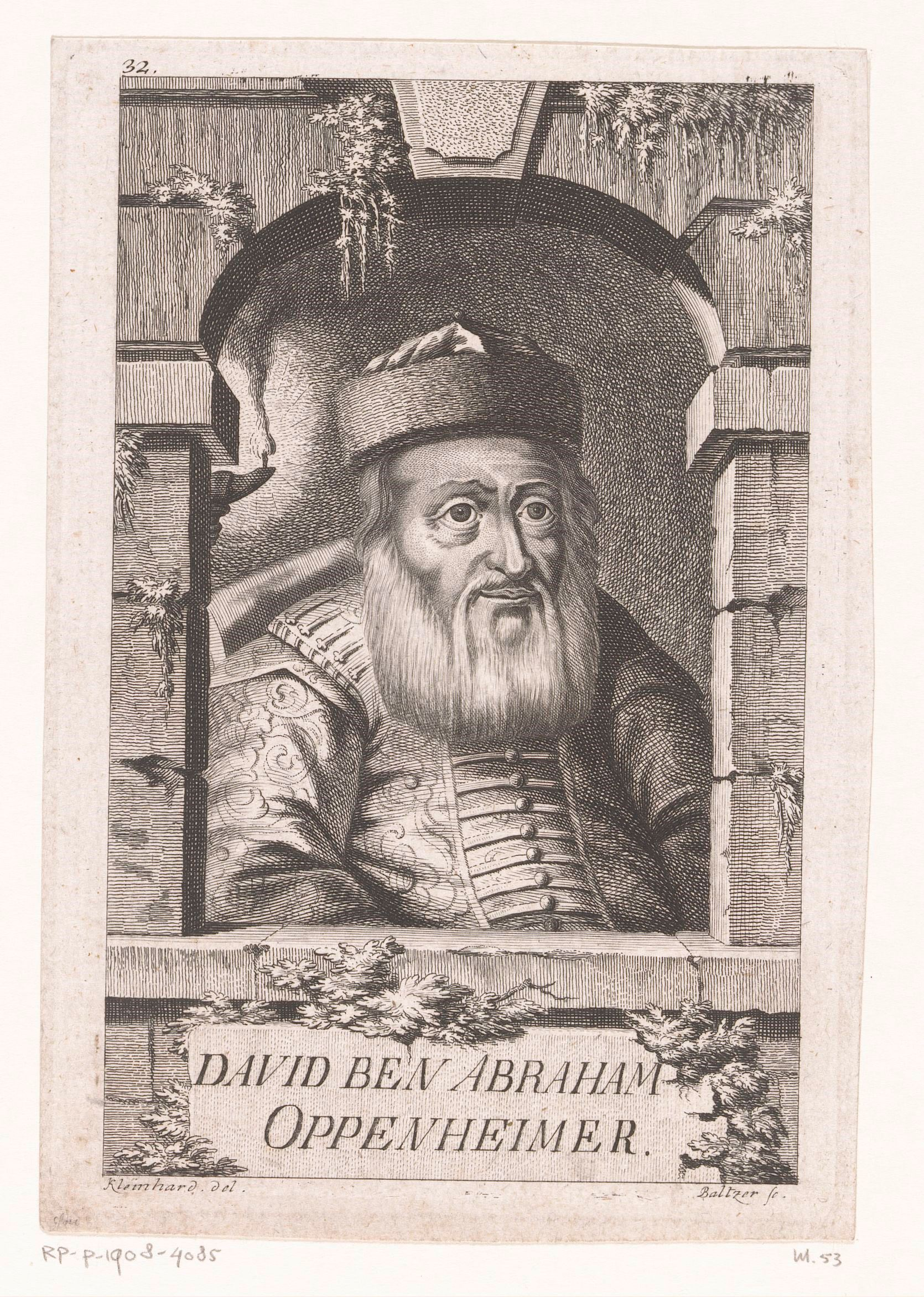
- Engraved portrait by Johann Balzer (1772).
- Born: June 1664; Worms, Holy Roman Empire
- Died: 12 September 1736 (aged 72); Prague, Kingdom of Bohemia
- Resting place: Old Jewish Cemetery, Prague
- Occupations: Rabbi, Posek, Book collector
- Years active: 1691-1736
- Era: Nikolsburg, Prague
- Known for: Book collector
- Spouses: Genendel (daughter of Leffmann Behrends); Shifra
- Father: Abraham Oppenheim
- Relatives: Samuel Oppenheimer (uncle)

David Oppenheim (1664 – 12 September 1736) was the chief rabbi of Nikolsburg in 1691 and later of Prague. His book collection constitutes an important part of the Hebrew section of the Bodleian Library in Oxford.

== Personal background ==
Oppenheim was born in 1664 in Worms, where his father, Abraham, was a community rabbi and leader and a brother of Samuel Oppenheimer. David Oppenheim's teachers included: Yair Bacharach, Gershon Ashkenazi, Ya'akov Sack (father of Tzvi Ashkenazi, the "Chacham Tzvi"), Benjamin Wolf Epstein, and Isaac Benjamin Wolff. In 1681, he married Gnendel, daughter of the "court Jew" Leffmann Behrends (Lipmann Cohen) of Hanover. His rabbinical responsibilities grew over the years: in 1691, he became the chief rabbi of Nikolsburg, in 1703 of Prague, in 1713 of half of Moravia, and by 1718, he led the entire region.

His grave is located in the Old Jewish Cemetery in Prague, between the Klausen Synagogue and the Old-New Synagogue. His tombstone was restored in 1978.

The Bodleian Library in Oxford bought his extraordinary collection of manuscripts and prints in 1829 for 9,000 thalers.

== Bibliography ==
- Marx, Alexander (1944). Studies in Jewish History and Booklore. New York: The Jewish Theological Seminary of America.
- Teplitsky, Joshua (2019). Prince of the Press. How One Collector Built History's Most Enduring and Remarkable Jewish Library. Yale University Press.
