= Peter C. Oppenheimer =

Goldman Sachs economist

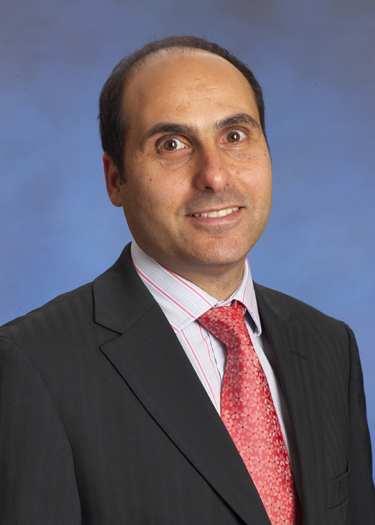
- Education: London School of Economics (BSc)
- Occupations: Chief Global Equity Strategist, Goldman Sachs

Peter C. Oppenheimer is chief global equity strategist and head of Macro Research in Europe within Global Investment Research at Goldman Sachs. Oppenheimer joined Goldman Sachs in 2002 as European and global strategist and was named managing director in 2003 and partner in 2006. He regularly appears in news outlets such as Financial Times, CNBC, The Guardian, The Independent, Bloomberg, and Barron’s among others as a finance strategist and expert.

Prior to joining the firm, Oppenheimer worked as managing director and chief investment strategist at HSBC and was previously head of European strategy at James Capel. Prior to that, he was chief economic strategist at Hambros Bank. Oppenheimer began his career as an economist at Greenwells in 1985.

In 2020, Oppenheimer wrote the book The Long Good Buy: Analysing Cycles in Markets, which explores the differences between cyclical factors and secular trends in markets, and the specific factors that have emerged for investors since the financial crisis. In 2024, Oppenheimer wrote his second book Any Happy Returns: Structural Changes and Super Cycles in Markets. The book discusses how structural changes in macroeconomic drivers, geopolitics, government policy and social attitudes all combine to drive secular super cycles that help to explain investor returns.

== Background ==
Oppenheimer grew up in London where he attended Hendon School. He earned a BSc, first class, in Geography from the London School of Economics. Oppenheimer is a trustee for the National Institute of Economic & Social Research (NIESR). He is also a trustee of The Anna Freud National Centre for Children and Families, a children's nonprofit dedicated to providing training and support for child mental health services.

== Op-eds and publications ==
- Binder, Jessica; Nielsen, Anders Ersbak Bang; and Oppenheimer, Peter (2010). “Finding Fair Value in Global Equities: Part I.” 36(2), The Journal of Portfolio Management, 80 – 93.
- Daly, Kevin; Nielsen, Anders Ersbak Bang; and Oppenheimer, Peter (2010). “Finding Fair Value in Global Equities: Part II—Forecasting Returns.” 36(3), The Journal of Portfolio Management, 56 – 70.
- Nielsen, Anders Ersbak Bang; and Oppenheimer, Peter (2011). Valuation over the cycle and the distribution of returns. In In F. Fabozzi and H. Markowitz (Ed.), Equity Valuation and Portfolio Management. Hoboken, New Jersey: John Wiley & Sons, Inc.
- Oppenheimer, Peter (2017). “Importance of Timing Bear Market is Overstated,” Financial Times.
- Oppenheimer, Peter (2012). “There is Life in This 'Investable' Rally,” Financial Times.
- Oppenheimer, Peter (2024). "The cycle vs the trend: investors need to prepare for secular change," Financial Times.
