= Damon Oppenheimer =

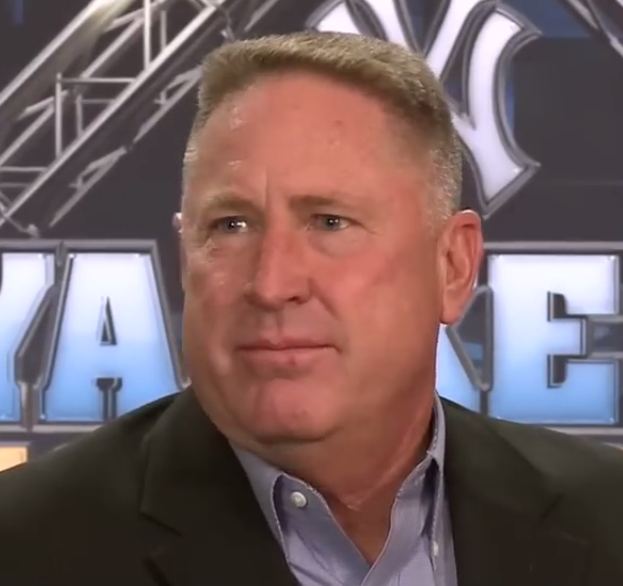
- Oppenheimer in 2019

New York Yankees
- Born: 1962 (age 63–64); United States
- Bats: Right Throws: Right
- Stats at Baseball Reference

Damon T. Oppenheimer (born 1962) is vice-president and director of amateur scouting for the New York Yankees.

== Playing career ==
Oppenheimer attended the University of Southern California (USC), where he played college baseball as a catcher for the USC Trojans baseball team. He was drafted out of USC by the Milwaukee Brewers in the 18th round (445th overall) of the 1985 Major League Baseball draft. He played one season for the Beloit Brewers of the Class-A Midwest League.

== Front office career ==
Oppenheimer became the director of player personnel for the Yankees in 2001. He was promoted to scouting director in 2005. He has been considered a likely future General manager (GM). He was considered for the Arizona Diamondbacks GM vacancy after the 2010 season, but the Yankees denied the Diamondbacks permission to interview him.
