= Fürstlich Castell'sche Bank =

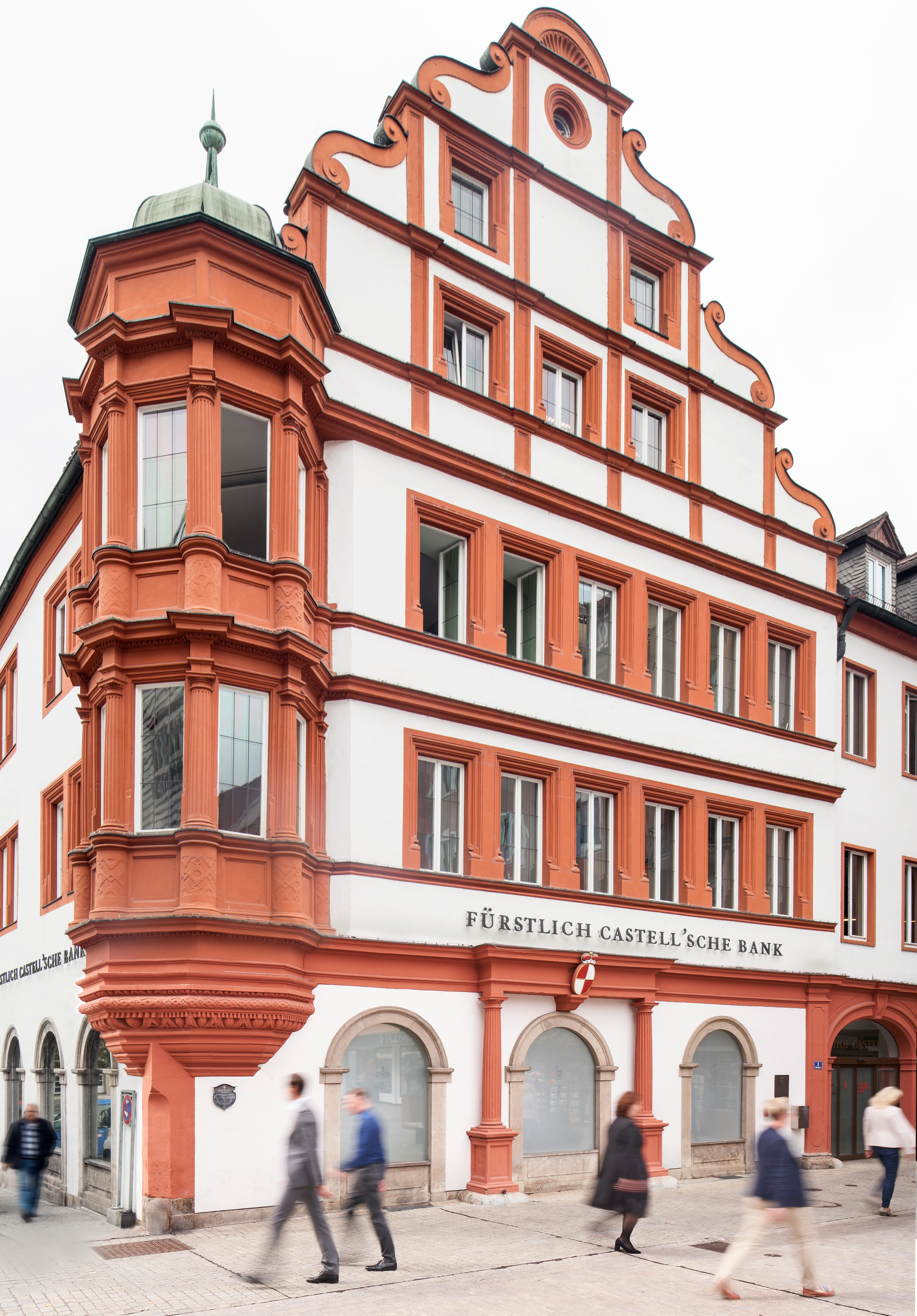
- Native name: Fürstlich Castell'sche Bank, Credit-Casse AG
- Industry: Bank
- Founded: 1774, Castell
- Headquarters: Marktplatz 1, 97070, Würzburg, Germany
- Key people: Ingo Mandt (Chairman of the Executive Board); Stephan Wycisk (Executive Board); Dr. Christoph Schücking (Chairman of the Supervisory Board); Ferdinand Fürst zu Castell-Castell (Deputy Chairman of the Supervisory Board); Otto Fürst zu Castell-Rüdenhausen (Deputy Chairman of the Supervisory Board); Katharina Gehra (Supervisory Board); Jessica Holzbach (Supervisory Board)
- Number of employees: 200
- Website: castell-bank.de

Fürstlich Castell'sche Bank, Credit-Casse AG is the third-oldest bank in continuous operation in Germany, founded in 1774 as the Gräflich Castell-Remlingen'sche Landes-Credit-Cassa.

The company’s registered office is in Castell, while its main administration and executive management have been located in Würzburg since 1972. The bank is family-owned by the Castell‑Castell and Castell‑Rüdenhausen families.

The bank positions itself primarily as a wealth and asset manager but also conducts private banking business. It is regarded as the oldest bank in Bavaria.

== History ==
The institution was founded in 1774 as the Gräflich Castell-Remlingen’sche Landes-Credit-Casse. The initiative for its establishment came from Friedrich Adolf von Zwanziger, who at the time served as chancellery director of the County of Castell. From 1806, the bank was headquartered for more than 40 years at what is now Bergstraße 2; in 1847, its headquarters were relocated to Rathausplatz 1.

In 1857, the Gräflich Castell'sche Neue Credit-Casse was founded as an additional institution, focusing on corporate banking and asset management. The older Landes-Credit-Casse maintained offices in several buildings in Castell. In 1941, the two banks merged to form the Fürstlich Castell’sche Bank.

In 2001, the company was converted into a partnership limited by shares (Kommanditgesellschaft auf Aktien, KGaA). With effect from 1 August 2006, the legal form was changed to the current public limited company (Aktiengesellschaft).

With effect from 1 January 2023, the bank appointed its former authorized representatives Christian Hille and Thomas Rosenfeld as members of the management board. Hille later left the company for personal reasons. Thomas Rosenfeld stepped down from the management board in 2024. On 1 July 2024, Inka Winter (Chief Sustainability Officer) was appointed authorized representative.

== See also ==
- List of banks in Germany
