= Castell, Bavaria =

Castell
- Municipality
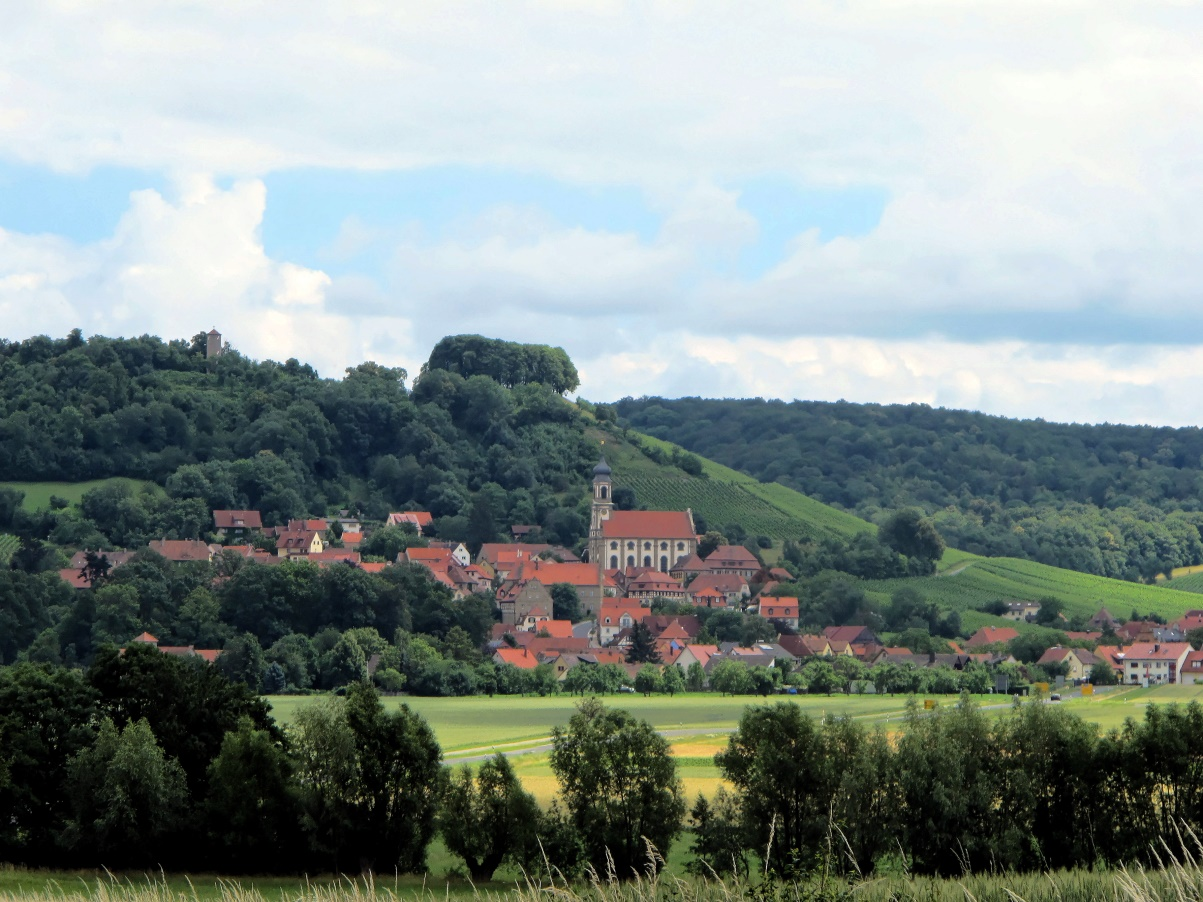
- View of Castell from the north

- Coat of arms

- Location of Castell within Kitzingen district
- Interactive map of Castell
- Location within Germany Location within Bavaria
- Coordinates: 49°45′N 10°20′E
- Country: Germany
- State: Bavaria
- Admin. region: Unterfranken
- District: Kitzingen
- Municipal assoc.: Wiesentheid
- Subdivisions: 3 Ortsteile

Government
  - Mayor (2020–26): Christian Hähnlein

Area
  - Total: 22.93 km^{2} (8.85 sq mi)
- Elevation: 317 m (1,040 ft)

Population (2025-12-31)
  - Total: 832
  - Density: 36.3/km^{2} (94.0/sq mi)
- Time zone: UTC+01:00 (CET)
  - Summer (DST): UTC+02:00 (CEST)
- Postal codes: 97355
- Dialling codes: 09325
- Vehicle registration: KT
- Website: www.castell-gemeinde.de

Castell is a municipality in the district of Kitzingen in Bavaria in Germany. It was the seat of the Counts of Castell. Today it is part of the municipal association Wiesentheid. It has around 800 inhabitants.

== Geography ==
=== Location ===
Castell is located on the western slope of the Mittelgebirge Steigerwald in the district of Kitzingen of the Franconia region. Its territory borders on that of Oberscheinfeld, located in the neighbouring district of Neustadt (Aisch)-Bad Windsheim.

=== Subdivision ===
Castell has seven Ortsteile: Castell, Forsthaus, Geiersmühle, Greuth, Gründleinsmühle, Trautberg and Wüstenfelden.

The municipal territory was 2,292 hectares in 2013, of which 1,162 ha were accounted for by forest and 936 by agricultural use. Settlement and transport areas total just 168 ha.

=== Neighbouring communities ===
Castell borders on (clockwise from the north) Abtswind, Geiselwind, Oberscheinfeld, Iphofen, Wiesenbronn and Rüdenhausen.

== History ==
Castell was first mentioned in the foundation charter of Megingaudshausen Abbey (later moved to Münsterschwarzach), dated 816.

In 1091, a noble named Rupert refers to himself in a document from the Diocese of Würzburg as de Castello, marking the first use of the name. From 1202, the lords of Castell held the rank of Graf (count), after 1228 with the supplement dei gratia ("by the grace of god").

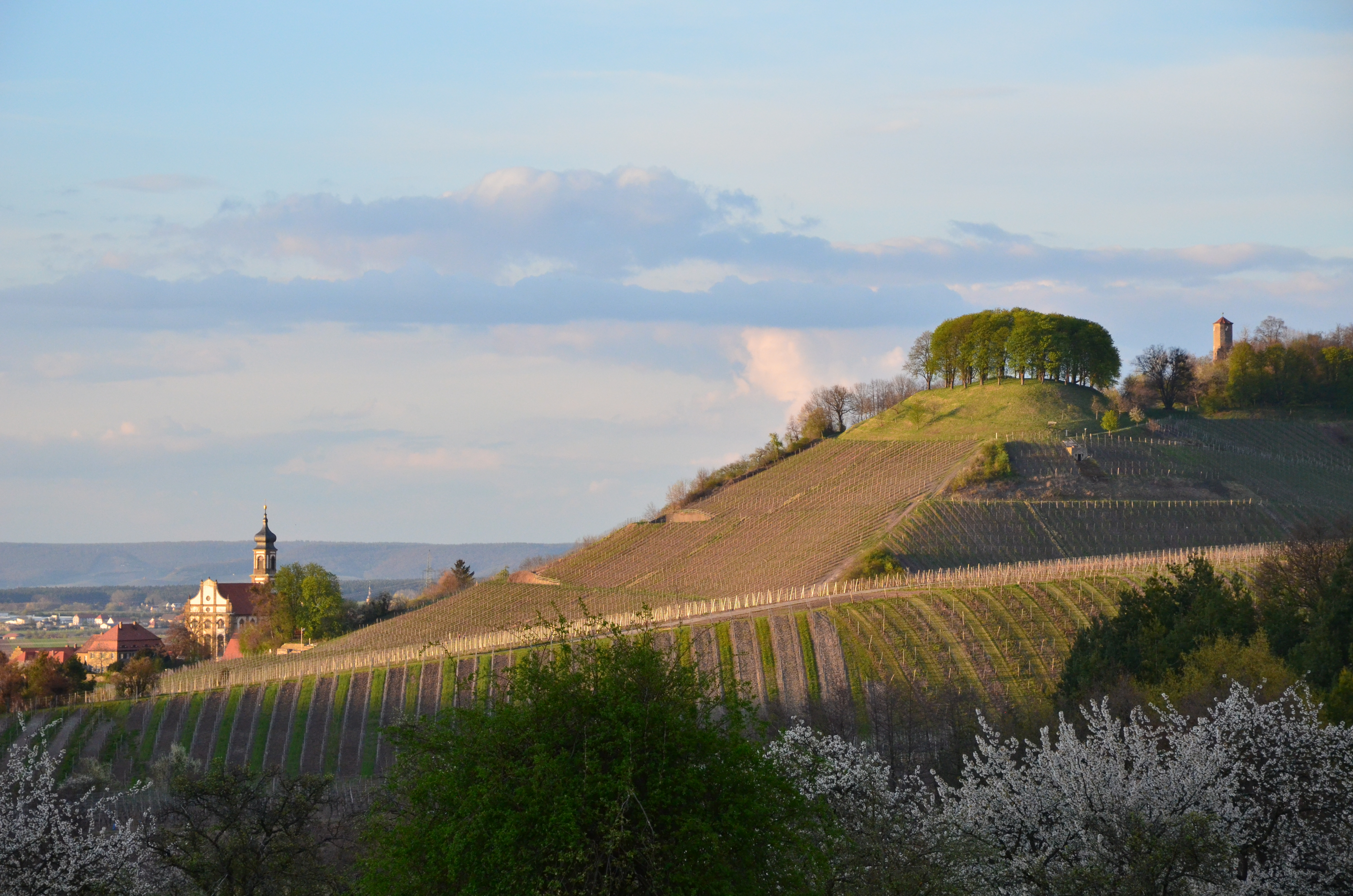
The site of the old castle on the Schlossberg above Castell

The hill south of the village, was long the site of two castles. This partition was first mentioned around 1266 in a document by Hermann I. zu Castell and Heinrich II. zu Castell. On the peak known as Herrenberg stood a castle held after 1328 by the Burgraviate of Nuremberg and later by the Margraviate of Brandenburg-Ansbach, who also controlled part of the village of Castell. On the Schlossberg stood a castle held by the Counts of Castell. Both were destroyed in the Peasants' War in 1525 by revolting peasants. The Counts had their castle rebuilt, while the other remained a ruin.

Between 1546 and 1561, the Counts Conrad, Georg and Heinrich Castell introduced Reformation to the county, thus founding a small Landeskirche centred on Castell.

After the destruction of their castle, the Margraviate of Brandenburg moved their Amt to Kleinlangheim but held on to their half of the village of Castell. In 1680/84, Graf Wolfgang Dietrich zu Castell-Remlingen (1641-1709) bought back the Brandenburg territory and had a new Baroque palace built by Peter Sommer in 1686–91. This was one of the earliest three-winged palaces in Franconia.

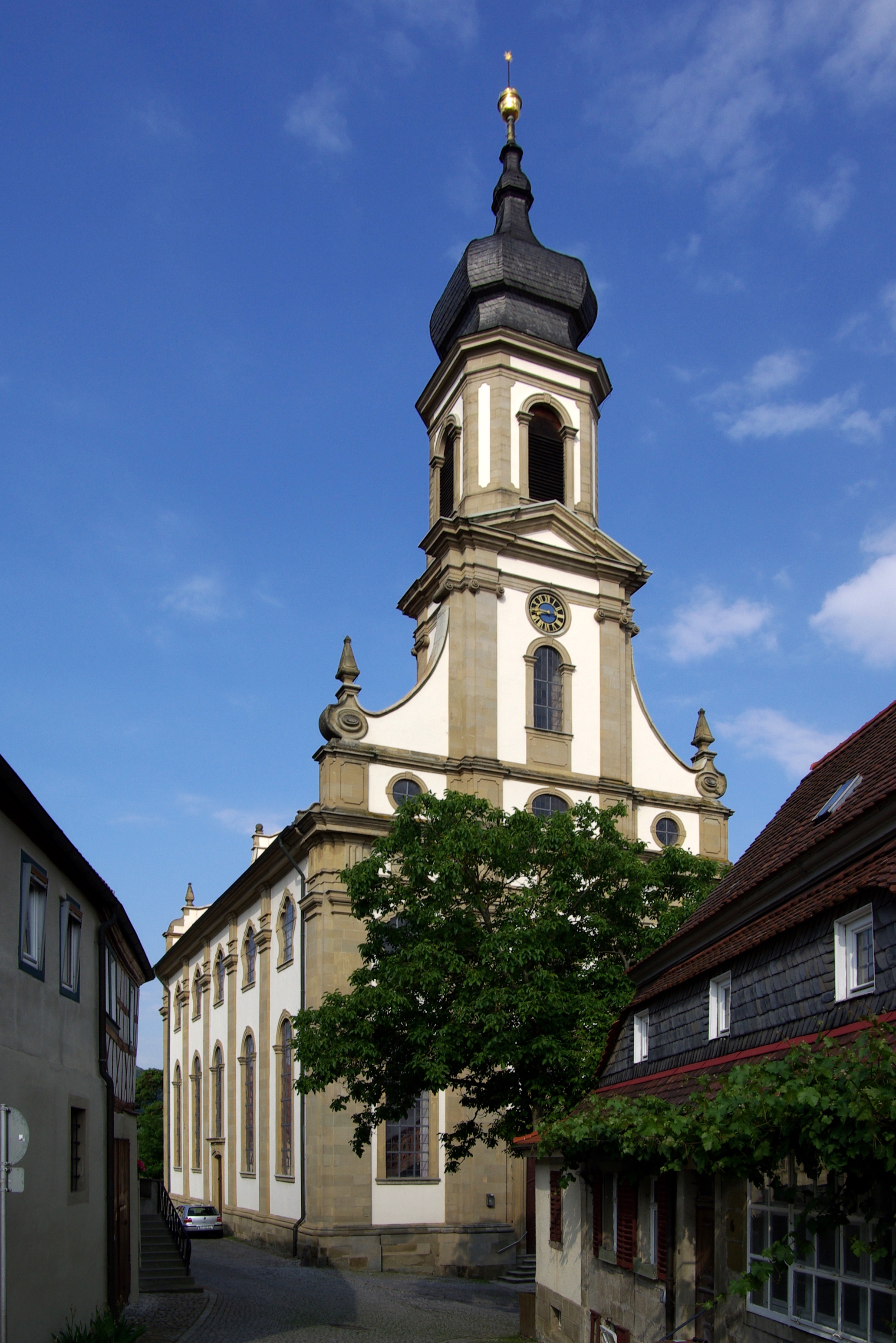
Church St. Johannes

In 1691, the Counts moved to the new Schloss at the foot of the hill and the old castle was relegated to a farm building. Later it was used as a source of building materials and, in 1818/19, Graf Friedrich Ludwig zu Castell-Castell had the previously treeless Schlossberg turned into an English landscape garden. The new castle is still today owned and inhabited by the prince of Castell-Castell.

In 1774, the Gräflich Castell-Remlingen'sche Landes-Credit-Cassa was founded here, the oldest Bavarian bank still in operation, known today as Fürstlich Castell’sche Bank.

During mediatisation, the County lost its role as a sovereign state it had held within the Holy Roman Empire. In September 1806, it was turned into a part of the Kingdom of Bavaria. The Landeskirche became part of the Bavarian Protestant church in 1814. In 1818, during the reordering of Bavaria, the municipality Castell was created.

From 1902 to 1907, the Fürstlich Castell'sches Archiv (princely archive) was set up by the historian and writer August Sperl, who also authored the standard work on the history of the House of Castell.

In 1950, the Communität Casteller Ring, a Protestant religious order for women, was established in Castell and took its name from the village. In 1957, the mother house moved to the Schwanberg.

On 1 July 1977, the formerly independent municipalities of Greuth and Wüstenfelden became part of Castell.

== Economy ==
Much of the economy of Castell is still linked to its historical role as a princely seat. Since 1972, the main office of the Fürstlich Castell’sche Bank has been at Würzburg, but it retains a presence in Castell which remains the formal seat of the bank.

Fürstlich Castell’sches Domänenamt produces high-quality wine on a total area of 70 hectares of vineyards. The vineyards around the Castell Schlossberg were first mentioned in 1266.

The village's many historic buildings also make it a popular tourist destination.

== Government ==
The mayor of Castell is Jochen Kramer.

== Attractions ==
The village features a number of listed monuments (see list of protected monuments in Castell (German)).

=== St. Johannes ===
The church St. Johannes (Castell), is one of the most prominent buildings in Castell. The current early Neoclassical hall church was built in 1784–92, based on plans by Joseph Albert still showing Baroque influences. Like its predecessors, it served as the main church of the Protestant Landeskirche of Castell. The princely burial place is located here. Today, it is the main church of the Evangelisch-Lutherisches Dekanat Castell.

=== Schloss Castell ===
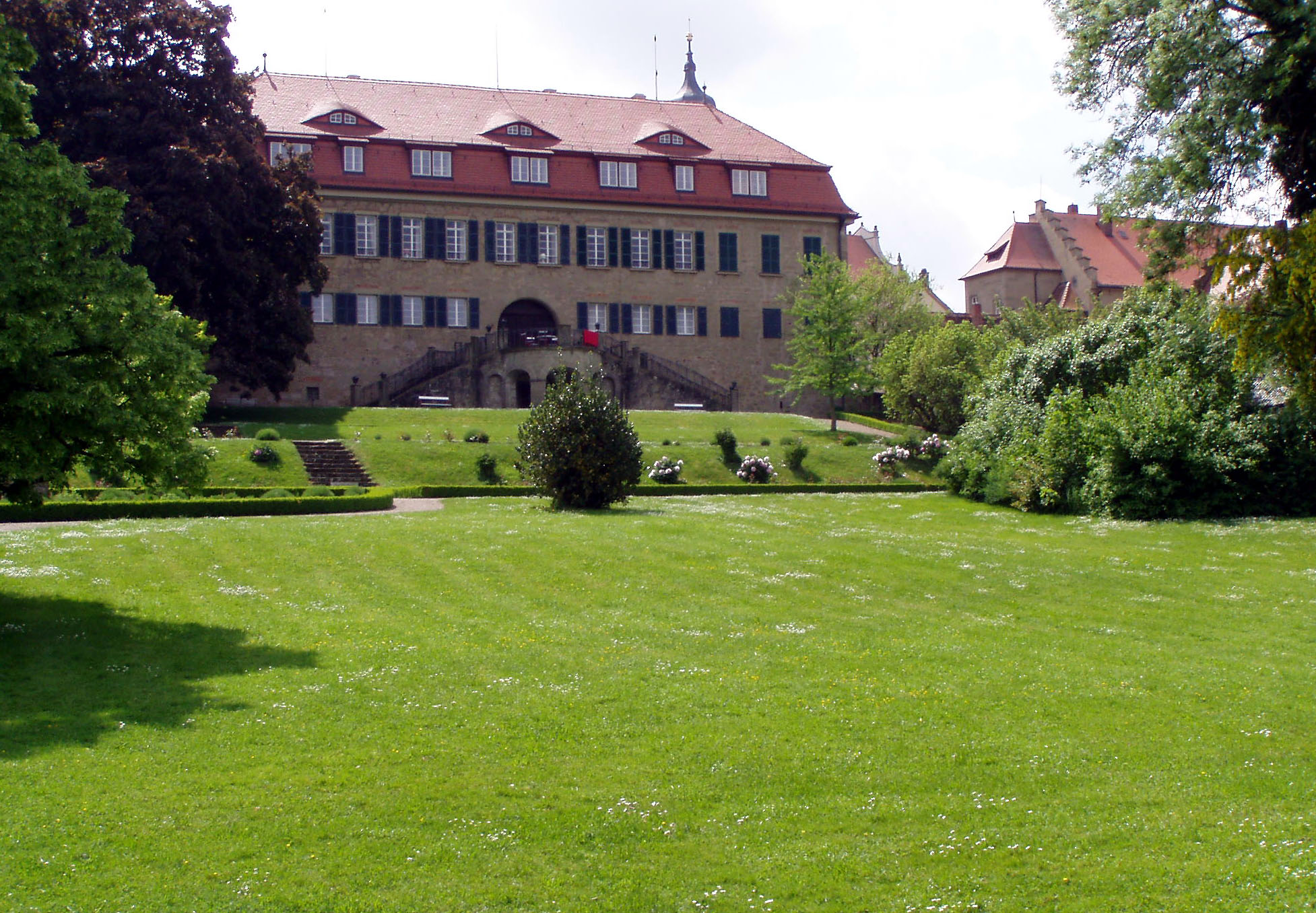
Schloss Castell

Schloss Castell (Castell palace), built in the late 17th century in Baroque style, remains the seat of the princely family of Castell-Castell. Around 1820, the formal Baroque garden was turned into an English landscape garden. Between 1863 and 1869 Graf Friedrich Ludwig (1791-1875) had the Torbau, the eastern wing and the corner pavilions rebuilt and expanded in Baroque revival style. A new stables was added at that time, which serves today as the restaurant Weinstall. Around 1870, the park was expanded based on plans by Carl von Effner. These Anlagen feature a pond, a new stables, a riding hall and the Wiedervereinigungsstein from 1991 by Theo Steinbrenner.

=== Castle ruins ===
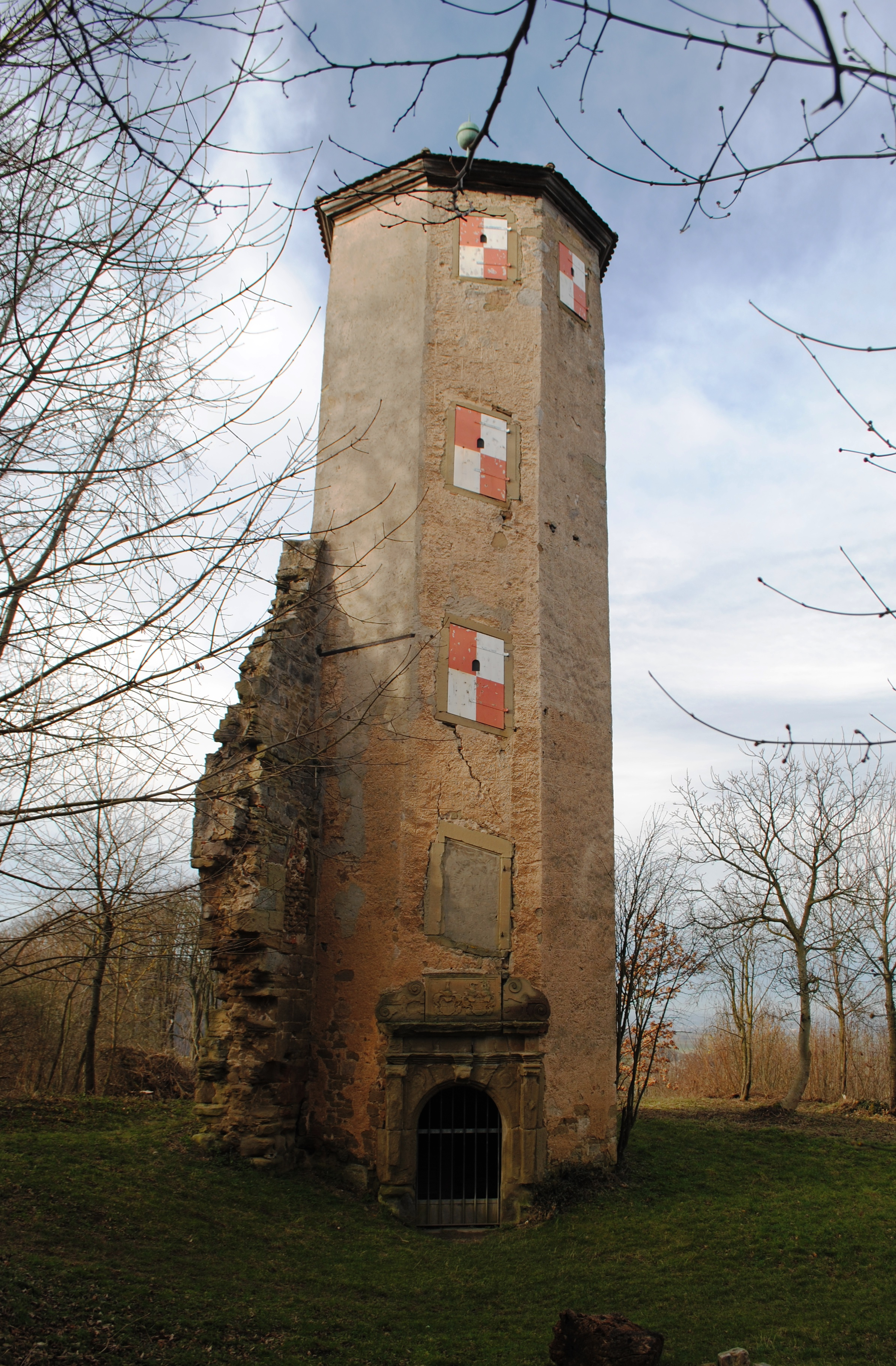
Remains of the Oberschloss

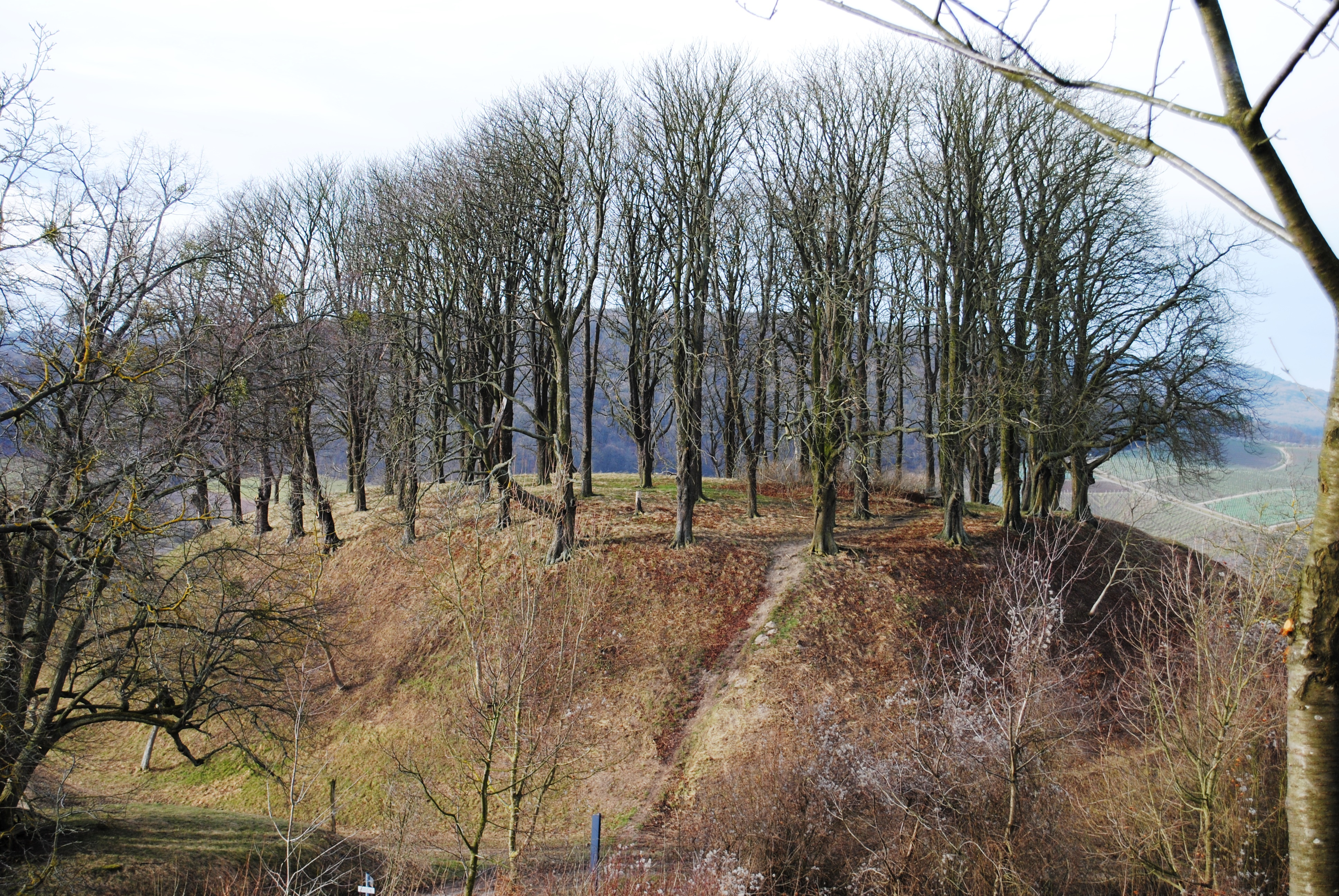
The mound where the Unterschloss once stood

Outside of the village, on the peaks known as Herrenberg and Schlossberg, are the remains of the two castles. The Oberschloss Castell marks the location of the original seat of the Counts of Castell. The medieval castle was expanded during the Second Margrave War in 1553. In 1607 to 1615 it was replaced by an early-modern one. This in turn fell into disuse after Schloss Castell was built. Besides trenches and structures below ground, only a stair tower with some attached walls remains today (this dates from the rebuilding in the early 17th century).

Even less is visible of the other castle, held by the Burgraviate of Nuremberg and later by the Margraviate of Brandenburg-Ansbach. It is today known as Turmhügel Altcastell , formerly also Unteres Schloss (lower castle) to distinguish it from the Oberes Schloss or Oberschloss (upper castle). All that remains of this structure is a mound, later planted with trees.

=== Wildbad ===
Castell served as a spa for many centuries. The Wildbad was first mentioned in 1399. It grew so fast in the 16th century that in 1601 a new two-storied spa building was erected in Renaissance style. Visitors took baths in curative "bitter" water. In the late 17th century, the Wildbad was closed. The building then served as the seat of the princely government and administration and of the Landeskirche. The princely bank was founded here and the building later housed the princely archive, which today contains around 8,000 documents. The original bathing rooms in the cellar also still exist today.

== Infrastructure ==
=== Transport ===
Castell is located on the Bundesstraße 286, not far south of the major highway Bundesautobahn 3.

The closest railway line is the Nuremberg–Würzburg railway which has a stop at Iphofen.

== Notable people ==
- Heinrich Adolph von Zwanziger (1776–1835), Bavarian military officer
- Heinrich Müller (1820–1864), anatomist and professor at the University of Wurzburg
- Friedrich Carl zu Castell-Castell (1864–1923), Fürst zu Castell-Castell
- Carl Parrot (1867–1911), ornithologist

== See also ==
- County of Castell
- Castell-Castell
- Castell-Remlingen
- Castell-Rüdenhausen
