= List of states in the Holy Roman Empire (C) =

This is a list of states in the Holy Roman Empire beginning with the letter C. Some historians mark the beginning of the Empire as 800, with the coronation of Frankish king Charlemagne ("Charles the Great").

Name	Type	Imperial circle	Imperial diet	History
Calvelage	County	n/a	n/a	1072: First mentioned 1170: Renamed to Ravensberg
Calw	County	n/a	n/a	c. 1075: First mentioned 1155: Acquired Löwenstein; 1189: Side line Calw-Vaihingen founded c. 1150: Partitioned into Calw-Löwenstein and Calw-Calw
Calw-Calw	County	n/a	n/a	c. 1150: Partitioned from Calw; 1282: Extinct; to Tübingen
Calw-Löwenstein	County	n/a	n/a	c. 1150: Partitioned from Calw; 1277: Sold to Würzburg; 1281: Sold to Austria; 1283: To Schenkenberg who founded the County of Löwenstein
Calw-Vaihingen	County	n/a	n/a	1189: Founded by Godfrey of Calw after marrying heiress of Vaihingen; 1364: Extinct; to Württemberg
Cambrai	Bishopric; 1559: Archbishopric	Low Rhen	n/a	6th Century: Diocese established 1007: Acquired Cambrésis; imperial immediacy 1543: To Spain; 1559: Raised to Archdiocese; 1677: To France
Cambrai	Imperial City	Low Rhen	n/a	1227: Gained some autonomy from the Bishops; 1543: To Spain; 1677: To France
Cammin (Kammin)	Bishopric	Upp Sax	see below	1140: Diocese established 1180: HRE Duke of the Empire; 1185-1227: Fief of Denmark; 1276: Acquired Kolberg; 1345: Imperial immediacy 1556: Secularised to Pomerania-Wolgast; 1648: Secularised as Principality of Cammin to Brandenburg
Cammin (Kammin)	Principality	Upp Sax	PR	1556: Secularised to Pomerania-Wolgast; 1648: Secularised as Principality of Cammin to Brandenburg
Cappenberg	County	n/a	n/a	10th - 11th Century; 1122: Rhenish possessions to Cappenberg Abbey and Ilbenstadt Abbey; 1124: Swabian possessions to Swabia
Carinthia (Kärnten)	Duchy	Aust	n/a	889: Partitioned from Bavaria; 976: from Margraviate to Duke; 1286: To Gorizia-Tyrol; 1335: To Austria; 1803: Bench of Princes
Carniola (Krain)	Duchy	Aust	n/a	1040: Partitioned from Carinthia; 1071: To Aquileia; 1245: To Austria; 1246: To Carinthia; 1269: To Bohemia; 1276: To Austria; 1286: To Gorizia-Tyrol; 1335: To Austria; 1364: Margraviate to Duke; 1803: Bench of Princes; 1805-1806: To France
Castell	1202/5: County	Franc	FR	1054: First mentioned 1266: Partitioned into Castell-Unterschloss and Castell-Oberschloss; 1331: Reunited by Castell-Oberschloss; 1546: Partitioned into Castell-Castell, Castell-Remlingen and Castell-Rüdenhausen
Castell-Castell	County	Franc	FR	1546: Partitioned from Castell; 1577: Extinct; divided between Castell-Remlingen and Castell-Rüdenhausen; 1668: Partitioned from Castell-Remlingen; 1717: Extinct; to Castell-Remlingen; 1718: Partitioned from Castell-Remlingen; 1772: Renamed to Castell-Remlingen
Castell-Oberschloss	County	n/a	n/a	1266: Partitioned from Castell; 1331: Renamed to Castell
Castell-Rehweiler	County	Franc	FR	1718: Partitioned from Castell-Remlingen; 1772: Extinct; to Castell-Castell
Castell-Remlingen	County	Franc	FR	1546: Partitioned from Castell; 1595: Extinct; to Castell-Rüdenhausen; 1597: Partitioned from Castell-Rüdenhausen; 1668: Partitioned into itself and Castell-Castell; 1718: Partitioned into itself, Castell-Castell, and Castell-Rehweiler; 1762: Extinct; to Castell-Castell; 1772: Renamed from Castell-Castell; 1803: Partitioned into itself and Castell-Rüdenhausen; 1806: To Bavaria
Castell-Rüdenhausen	County	Franc	FR	1546: Partitioned from Castell; 1597: Partitioned into Castell-Remlingen and itself 1803: Extinct; to Castell-Remlingen; 1803: Partitioned from Castell-Remlingen; 1806: To Bavaria
Castell-Unterschloss	County	n/a	n/a	1266: Partitioned from Castell; 1331: Extinct; to Castell-Oberschloss
Celje; See: Cilli				
Chablais	County; 1310: Duchy	n/a	n/a	1018: To St Maurice's Abbey; 1035: Half to Savoy; 1128: All to Savoy; 1475: Half to Bern; 1536: All to Bern; 1569: All to Savoy; 1792: To France
Chiemsee	Bishopric	Bav	EC	1215: Diocese established; Held administrative functions in the Archbishopric of Salzburg; Initially held votes in the Bavarian Circle and the Bench of Spiritual Princes; 1803: Secular functions abolished 1808: Diocese abolished
Chiny	County	n/a		1337: Yvois and Virton sold to Luxembourg; 1364: To Luxembourg
Chur	Bishopric	Aust	EC	451: First mentioned 958: Acquired territorial rights 1798: To the Helvetic Republic
Cilli (Celje; Cilly)	Lordship; 1341: County; 1436: Princely County	n/a	n/a	1123: First mentioned; ministerialis of Styria; 1322: Acquired Heunburg as fief of Carinthia; 1333: Acquired Celje; 1341: HRE Count; 1397: Acquired Varaždin and Zagorje as fief of Hungary; 1418: Acquired Ortenburg; 1436: HRE Princely Count; 1456: Extinct; to Austria
Cleves (Kleve)	County	n/a	n/a	1092: First mentioned; emerged from the gau county of Hamaland; 1255: Partitioned into itself and Kranenburg c. 1275: Partitioned into itself and Hülchrath; 1290: Acquired Duisburg; 1368: Extinct; to Mark; 1394: Partitioned from Mark; 1397: Acquired Ravenstein; 1398: Acquired Mark; renamed to Cleves-Marck; 1521: To Jülich-Cleves-Berg; 1609: War of the Jülich Succession; 1614: To Brandenburg; 1795: To France; 1815: To Prussia
Cleves-Marck (Kleve-Mark)	County; 1417: Duchy	Low Rhen	PR	1398: Renamed from Cleves after acquisition of Mark; 1417: HRE Duke; 1450: Appanage Cleves-Ravenstein established 1491: Side line Cleves-Nevers founded in France; 1521: Extinct; to Jülich-Berg who formed Jülich-Cleves-Berg
Cleves-Ravenstein	Barony	n/a	n/a	1450: Appanage created in Cleves-Marck; 1528: Extinct; appanage abolished
Colloredo	Lordship; 1588: Barony; 1724: County; 1763: Principality	Swab	SC	1026: First mentioned; in the service of the Emperor; 1031: Invested with Mels as fief of Aquileia; 1588: HRE Baron; 1724: HRE Count; 1741: Bench of Counts of Swabia (Personalist); 1763: HRE Prince; 1780: Acquired Bohemian estates of Mansfeld; 1788: Renamed to Colloredo-Mansfeld
Colloredo-Mansfeld	Principality (personalist)	Swab	SC	1788: Renamed from Colloredo; 1803: Purchased a portion of Limpurg, and Rieneck; 1806: Limpurg to Württemberg, Rieneck to Regensburg
Colmar	Imperial City	Upp Rhen	RH	1226: Free Imperial City; 1679: To France
Cologne (Köln)	Archbishopric; 1356: Prince-Elector	El Rhin	EL	313: Diocese first mentioned 814: Raised to Archdiocese; 954: Acquired secular territory; HRE Prince of the Empire; 1180: Acquired Westphalia and Angria; HRE Duke; 1356: HRE Elector; 1794: Left bank to France; 1803: Secularised; Westphalia to Hesse-Darmstadt and Nassau-Orange-Fulda, Vest Recklinghausen to Arenberg
Cologne (Köln)	Imperial City	Low Rhen	RH	1288: Free Imperial City; 1794: To France; 1815: to Prussia
Comburg	Abbacy; 1488: Provostry	Franc	SC	1078: Abbey established 13th Century?: Imperial immediacy 1484: Made fief of the Bishopric of Würzburg; 1488: Converted into a Provostry; 1583: Made fief of Württemberg; 1803: Secularised
Cornelimünster; See: Kornelimünster	Abbacy			
Corvey (Korvey)	Abbacy; 1792: Bishopric; 1803: Principality	Low Rhen	EC	877: Abbey established c. 1150: Imperial immediacy c. 1582: HRE Prince of the Empire; 1792: Converted to a Bishopric; 1803: To Nassau-Orange-Fulda; 1807: To Westphalia; 1815: To Prussia
Cottbus	Lordship	n/a	n/a	1199: Lords of Cottbus first mentioned 1445: Sold to Brandenburg; 1807: To Saxony; 1813: To Prussia
Croÿ (Croy)	Lordship; 1677: Principality; 1767: Duchy	Low Rhen	PR	12th Century: First mentioned 1590: Acquired Solre; fief of the Spanish Netherlands; 1677: HRE Prince; 1767: Duke in France; 1803: Acquired Dülmen; 1806: To Arenberg; 1810: To France; 1815: To Prussia
Cuijk (Cuyk)	Lordship	n/a	n/a	11th Century: First mentioned 1132: Side line Cuijk-Arnsberg founded 1400: Sold to Guelders; 1492: Extinct
Cuijk-Arnsberg	Lordship	n/a	n/a	1132: Established when Godfrey I of Cuijk acquired Arnsberg by marriage 1166: Made fief of Cologne; 1237: Side line Rietberg founded 1352: Ceded Fredeburg to Marck; 1368: Sold to Cologne; 1371: Extinct
