= Counts of Castell =

German noble family

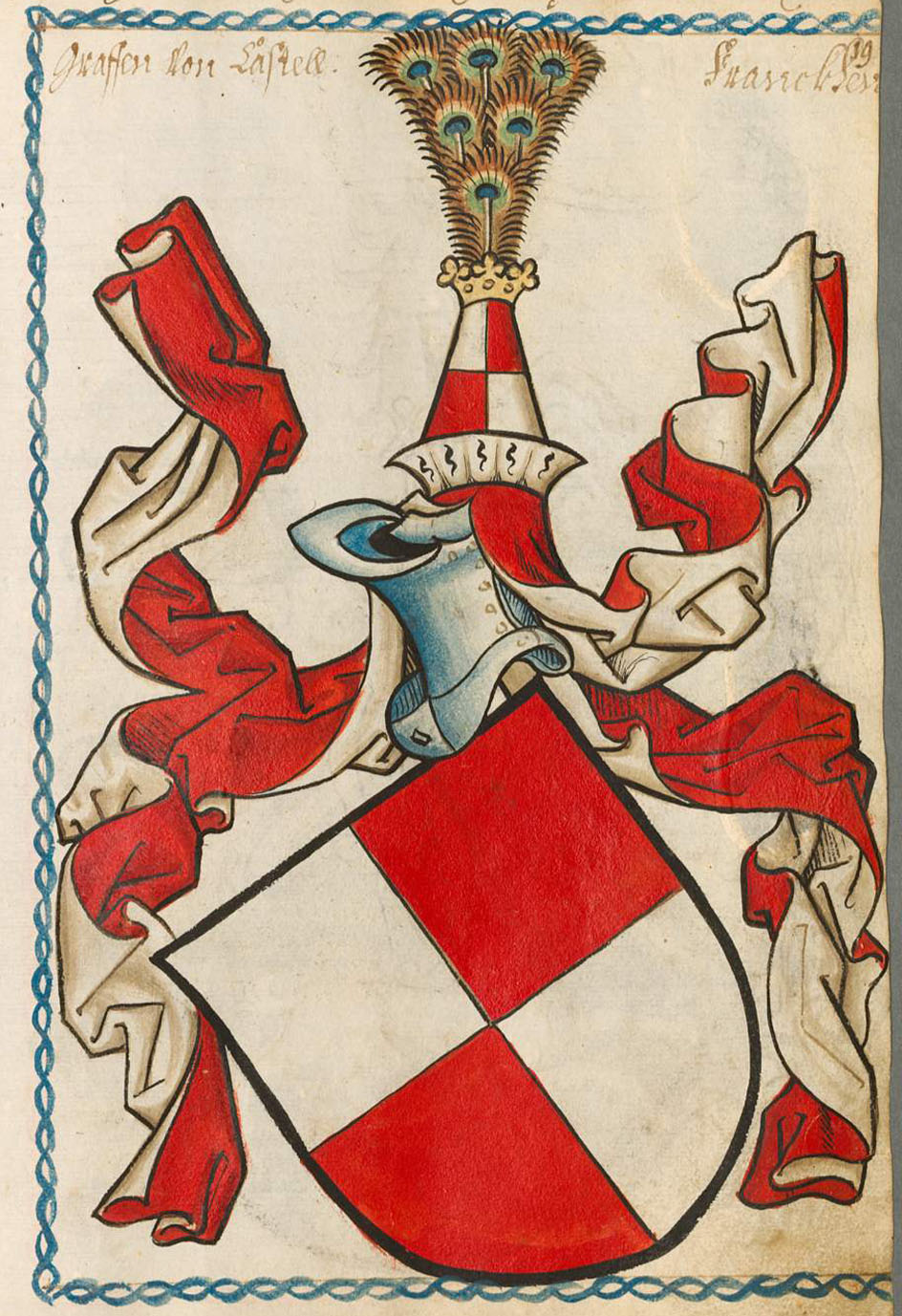
Original Coat of arms of the family, from the Scheiblersches Wappenbuch

The House of Castell is a German noble family of mediatised counts of the old Holy Roman Empire. In 1901, the heads of the two family branches, Castell-Castell and Castell-Rüdenhausen, were each granted the hereditary title of Prince by Luitpold, Prince Regent of Bavaria.

== History ==
The family appears in 1057 with Robbrath de Castello. The County of Castell was created in 1200, in the modern region of Franconia in northern Bavaria, Germany. Rulership of Castell was shared between the brothers Louis and Rupert II in 1223, and later with the brothers Albert II, Frederick II and Henry I in 1235. The County was partitioned into Elder and Younger lines in 1254, which were reunited in 1347 with the extinction of the Elder branch. Castell was repartitioned in 1597 into Castell-Remlingen and Castell-Rüdenhausen. When Count Wolfgang Theodoric of Castell-Castell (itself a partition of Castell-Remlingen) died in 1709, the County of Castell was recreated as a partition. Castell was annexed to Castell-Castell in 1772.

== Counts of Castell (1200–1254) ==
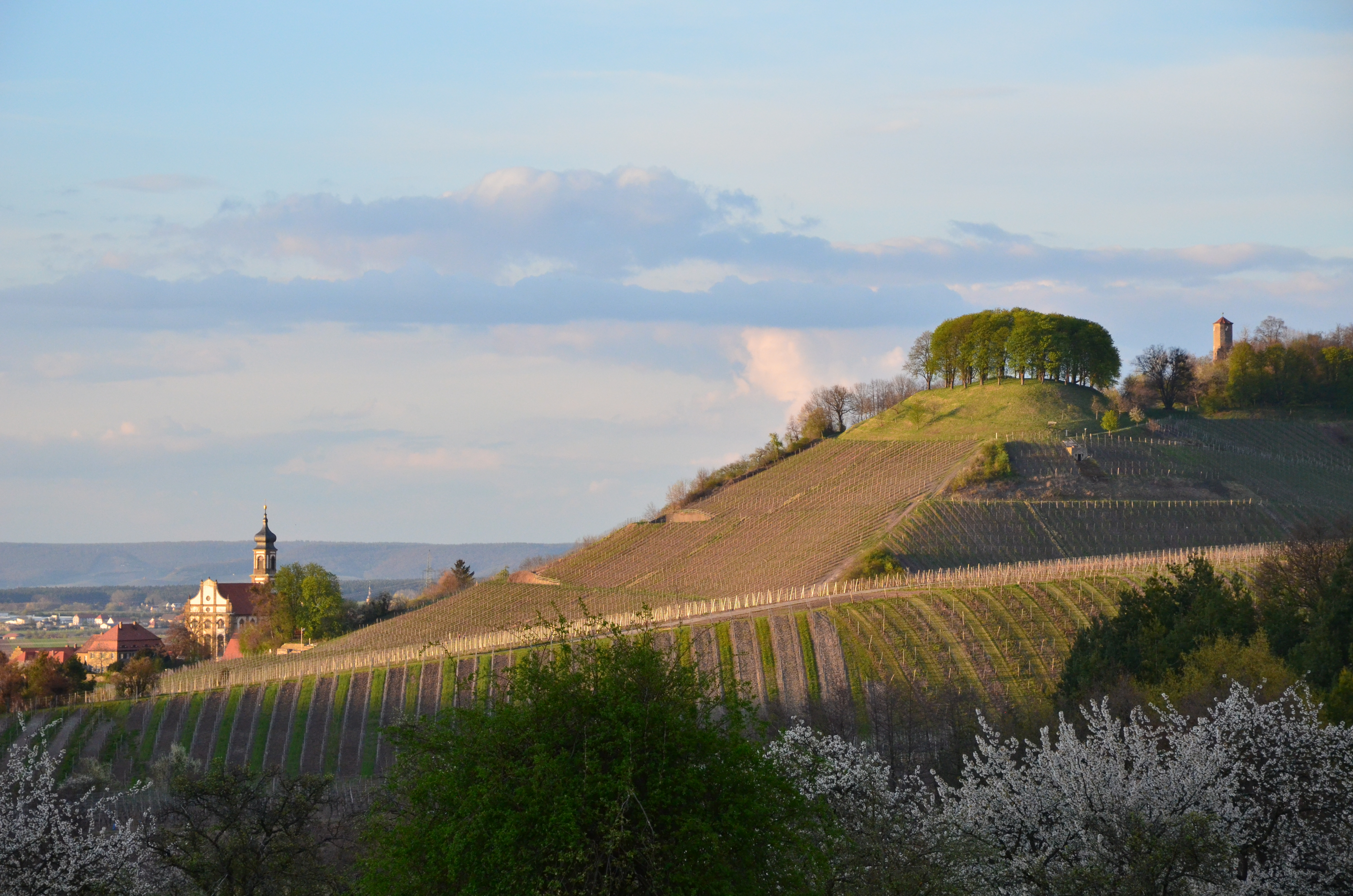
The site of the old castle on the hill above Castell

- Rupert I (1200–23)
- Louis (1223–30) with...
- Rupert II (1223–35)
- Albert II (Count of Castell (Younger)) (1235–54) with...
- Frederick II (1235–51) and...
- Henry I (1235–54) and...
- Frederick III (1251–4)

Partitioned between Elder and Younger lines

== Counts of the Elder Line of Castell (1254–1347) ==
- Henry II (1254–307)
- Rupert II (1307–34)
- Henry III (1334–47)

Line extinct and inherited by the Younger line, which renamed itself to Castell

== Counts of the Younger Line of Castell (1254–1347) ==
- Albert II (Count of Castell) (1254–8)
- Herman II (1258–85)
- Frederick IV (Count of Castell) (1285–1347)

Line inherited the Elder branch and was renamed to Castell

== Counts of Castell (1347–1597) ==
- Frederick IV, Count of Castell, from the Younger line (1347–49)
- Herman IV (1349–63) with...
- Frederick VII 1349–76) and...
- John I (1363–84) and...
- William I (1363–99)
- Leonard (1399–426)
- William II (1426–79)
- Frederick IX (1479–98)
- George I (1498–1528) with...
- John III (1498–500) and...
- Wolfgang I (1498–546)
- Conrad II (1546–77) with...
- Frederick XI (1546–52) and...
- Henry IV (1546–95) and...
- George II (1546–97)

Partitioned into Castell-Remlingen and Castell-Rüdenhausen

== Counts of Castell (1709–1772) ==
- Louis Frederick (1709–72) with...
- Christian Adolph Frederick (Count of Castell-Remlingen) (1743–62)

Inherited by Count Christian Frederick Charles of Castell-Castell

== After 1806 ==
The family was mediatized in 1806 and 1815, however without the loss of its equal-to-royal rank, and the two states were incorporated into Bavaria. In 1901, both branches received the Bavarian rank of Prince (only in primogeniture), with the title of Prince (Serene Highness) for the heads of the branches and the title of Count/Countess (Illustrious Highness) for all other members of the House.

== Castell-Castell line ==
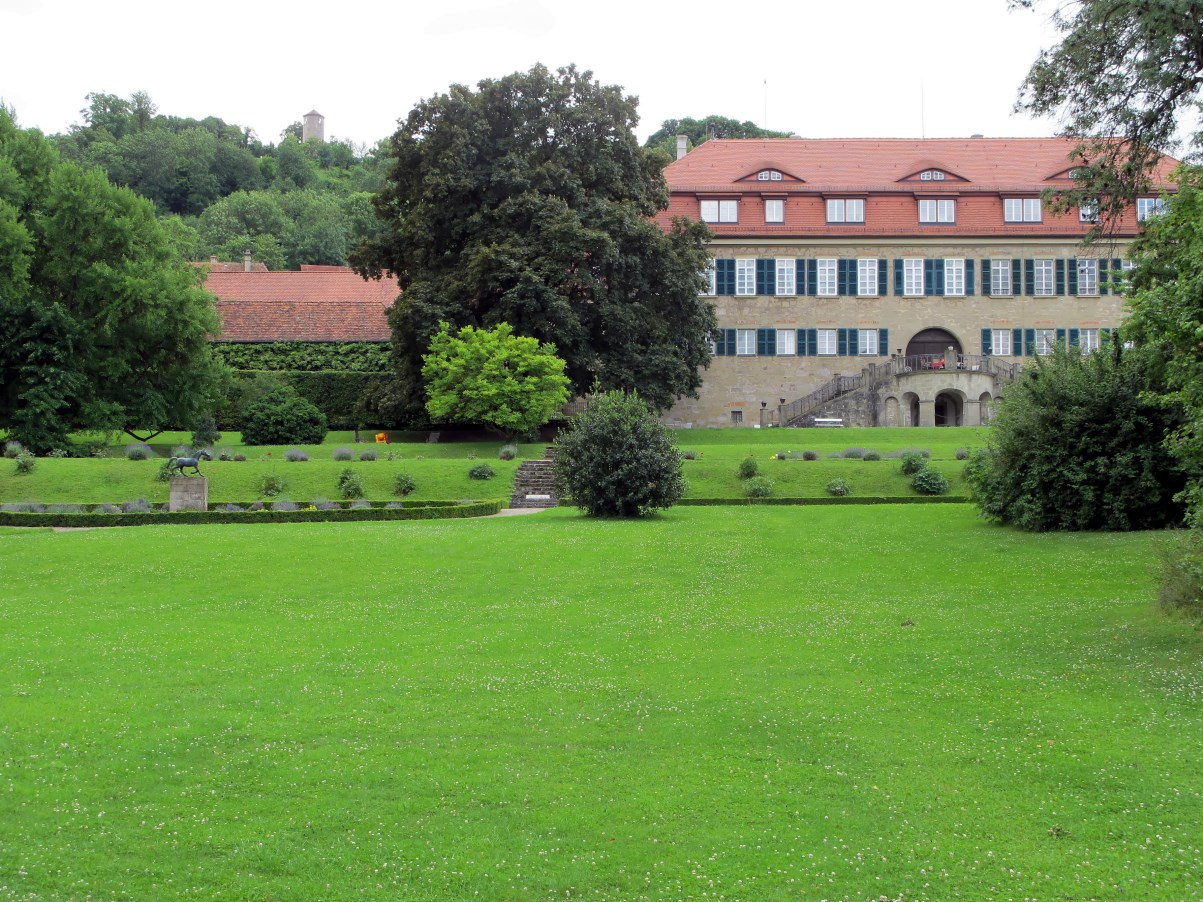
Castell Castle

- Friedrich Carl, Count 1886-1901, 1st Prince 1901-1923 (1864-1923), m. Gertrud, Countess of Stolberg-Wernigerode
  - Carl, 2nd Prince 1923-1945 (1897-1945), m. Anna-Agnes, Princess of Solms-Hohensolms-Lich
    - Albrecht, 3rd Prince 1945-2016 (1925-2016), m. Marie Luise, Princess of Waldeck and Pyrmont
      - Ferdinand, 4th Prince 2016–present (born 1965), m. Marie-Gabrielle, Countess of Degenfeld-Schonburg
        - Count Carl of Castell-Castell (born 2001)

== Castell-Rüdenhausen line ==
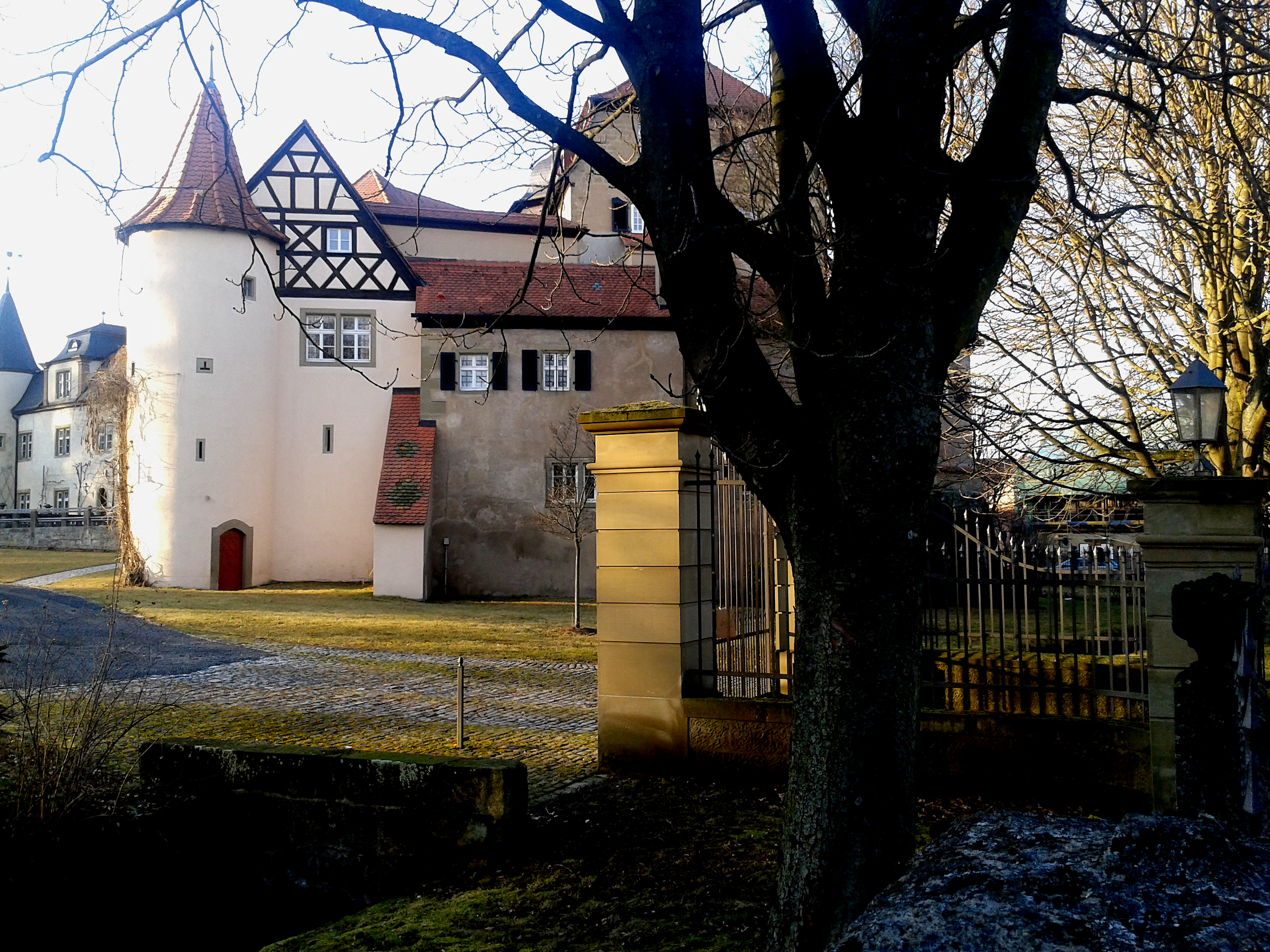
Rüdenhausen Castle

- Wolfgang, Count 1850-1901, 1st Prince 1901-1913 (1830-1913), m. Emma, Princess of Ysenburg and Büdingen in Büdingen
  - Casimir, 2nd Prince 1913-1933 (1861-1933), m. Mechtild, Countess of Bentinck
    - Rupert, 3rd Prince 1933-1944/1951 (1910-missing 1944, declared dead 1951)
    - Siegfried, 4th Prince 1944/1951-2007 (1916-2007), m. Irene, Countess of Solms-Laubach
      - Johann Friedrich, 5th Prince 2007-2014 (1948-2014), m. Maria, Countess of Schönborn-Wiesentheid
        - Otto Friedrich, 6th Prince 2014–present (born 1985)
        - Count Anton of Castell-Rüdenhausen (born 1992)
      - Count Manto Friedrich (b. 1949)
        - Countess Marie Karoline Johanna Mechtild (b. 1985)
      - Countess Donata of Castell-Rüdenhausen (1950-2015), m. I) Prince Louis Ferdinand of Prussia (1944–1977), m. II) Duke Friedrich August of Oldenburg (b. 1936)
      - Count Christian (1952-2010), owner of Twickel castle near Hof van Twente, Netherlands, m. Carolina Hintzen
        - Count Juriaan Georg Frederik (b. 1978)
        - Count Roderik Frederik (b. 1980) m. Elisabeth Lotgering
          - Count Alexander (b. 2015)
        - Countess Clara Marie (b. 1983)
      - Count Rupert Friedrich of Castell-Rüdenhausen (born 1954), m. Alexandra, Baroness of Werthern-Beichlingen
        - Count Philipp of Castell-Rüdenhausen (born 1979)
        - Count Leopold of Castell-Rüdenhausen (born 1981)
      - Count Karl Friedrich of Castell-Rüdenhausen (born 1957)
      - Count Hermann Friedrich of Castell-Rüdenhausen (born 1963), m. Henriette, Princess of Waldeck and Pyrmont
        - Count Casimir of Castell-Rüdenhausen (born 1994)
  - Alexander, Count of Faber-Castell 1898-1927 (1866-1928), children by 1st marriage Faber-Castell (see below)
  - Count Hugo of Castell-Rüdenhausen (1871-1936), m. Clementine, Countess of Solms-Sonnenwalde
    - Count Friedrich-Wolfgang of Castell-Rüdenhausen (1906-1940), m. Karoline-Mathilde, Princess of Saxe-Coburg-Gotha
      - Count Bertram Friedrich of Castell-Rüdenhausen (1932-2024), m. Felizitas, Countess of Auersperg
        - Count Dominik of Castell-Rüdenhausen (born 1965)
        - Count Michael of Castell-Rüdenhausen (born 1967)

== Faber-Castell ==
This is a collateral, morganatic line of Castell-Rüdenhausen. Through the marriage of Count Alexander von Castell-Rüdenhausen (1866–1928) with Baroness Ottilie von Faber (1877–1944), from a well-known family of industrialists, the branch of Faber-Castell was created in 1898.

The current Faber-Castell company was founded in 1761 at Stein near Nuremberg by cabinet maker Kaspar Faber (1730–1784), and it has remained in the family for nine generations. The company opened branches in New York (1849), London (1851) and Paris (1855), and then expanded to Vienna (1872) and St. Petersburg (1874). It opened a factory in Geroldsgrün and expanded internationally, and it launched new products under Kaspar Faber's ambitious great-grandson, Lothar von Faber (1817–1896). In 1900, after the marriage of Lothar's granddaughter with a cadet of the Counts of Castell, the A. W. Faber enterprise took the name of Faber-Castell and a new logo, combining the Faber motto ("Since 1761") with the "jousting knights" of the Castells' coat of arms.

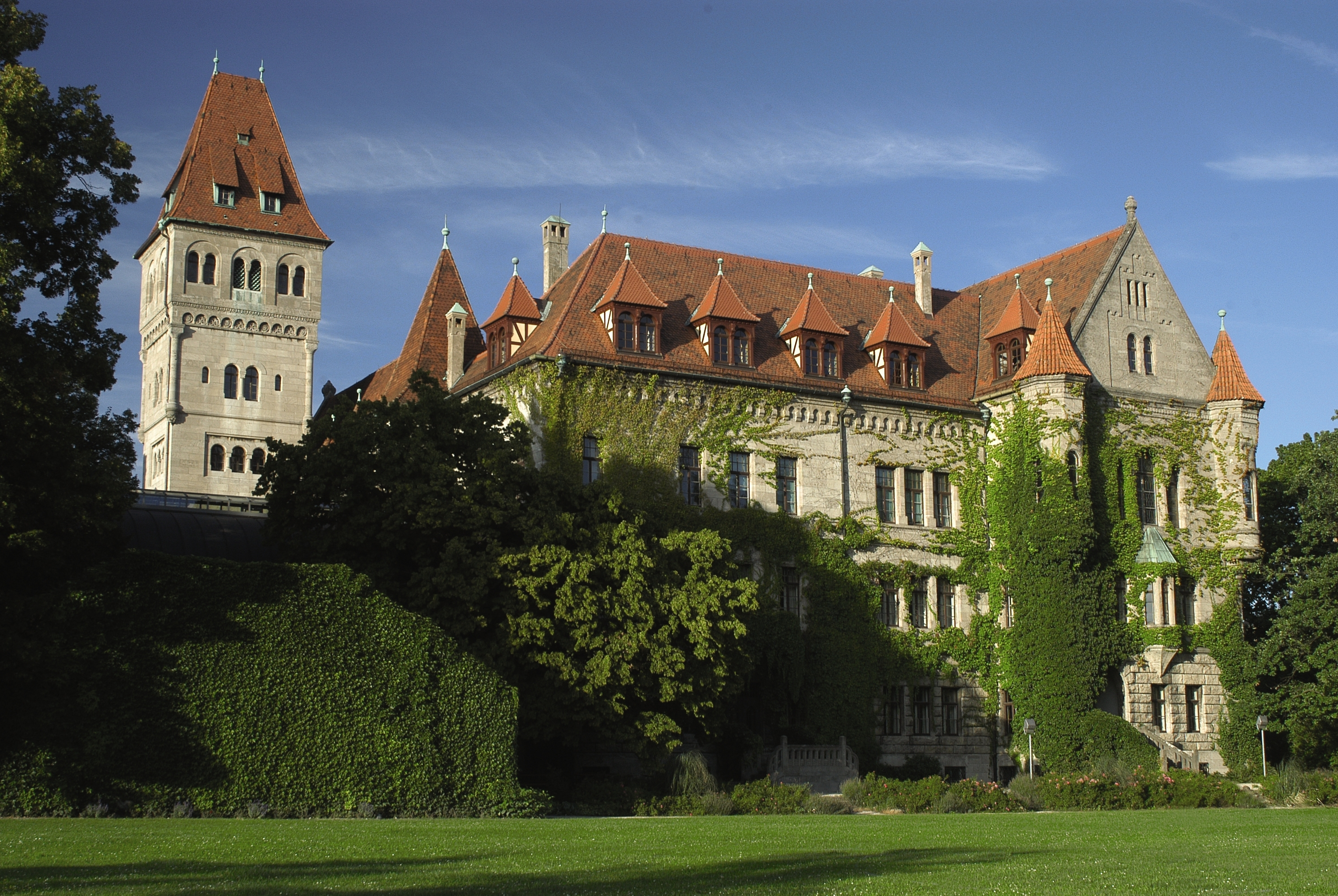
Faber Castle at Stein near Nuremberg

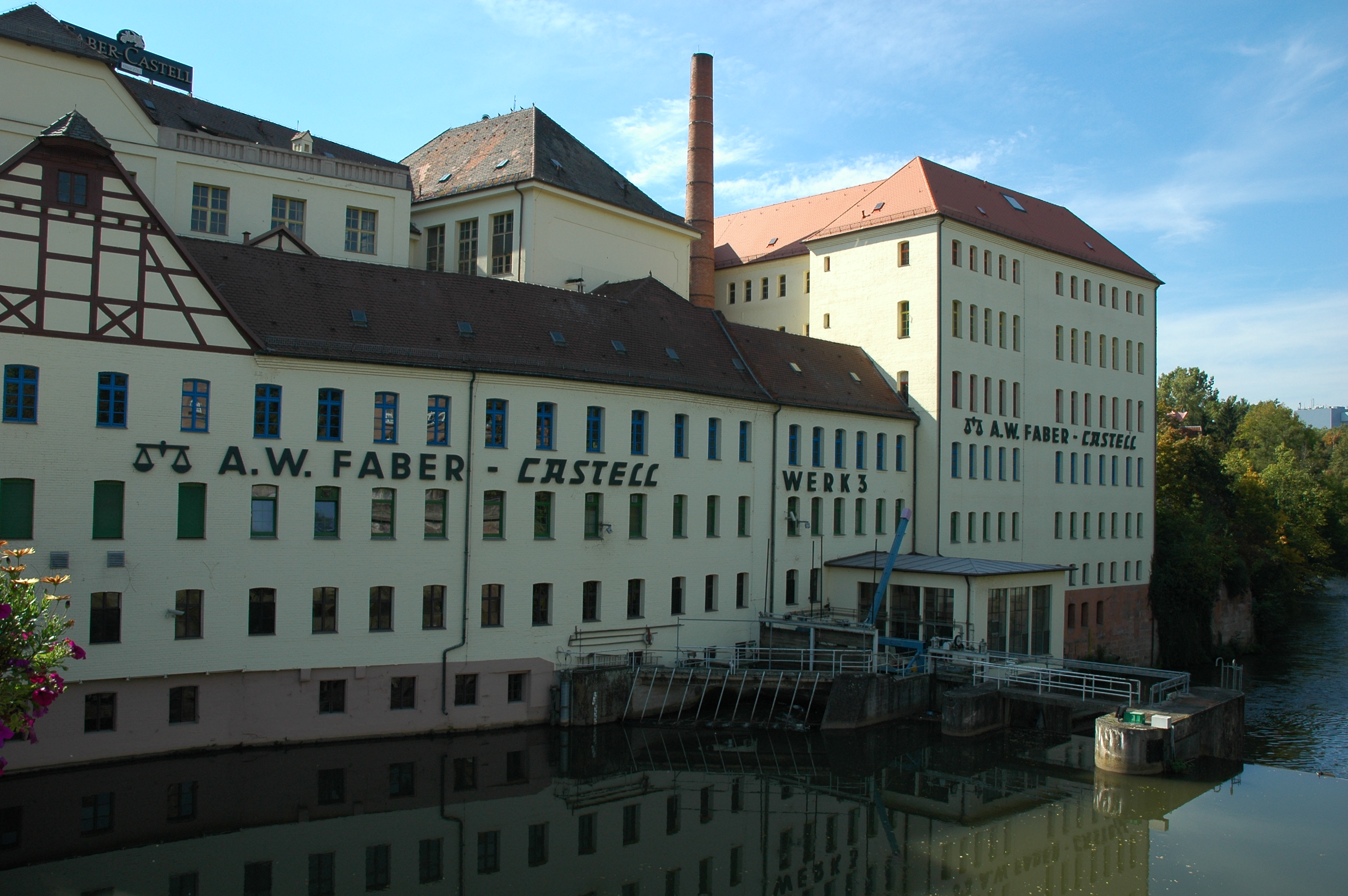
Faber-Castell works at Stein

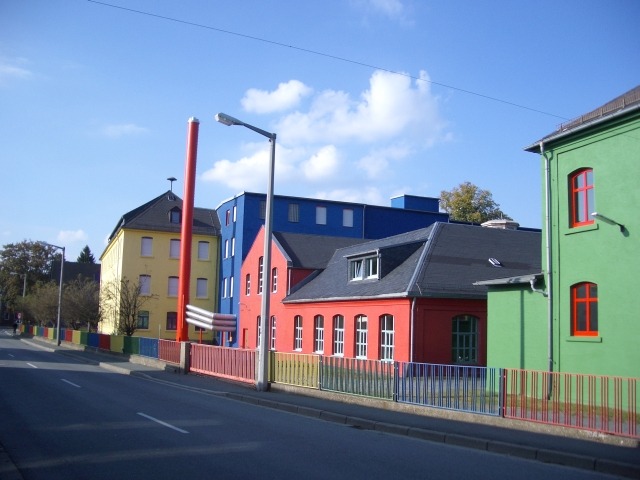
Faber-Castell works at Geroldsgrün

A descendant of the first Prince of Castell-Rüdenhausen, Count Alexander von Castell-Rüdenhausen (1866–1928), married Baroness Ottilie von Faber (1877–1944), heiress of the Faber pencil "dynasty", in 1898. Although the immensely wealthy Lothar von Faber had been ennobled in 1861 and titled as Freiherr (Baron) von Faber in the Kingdom of Bavaria in 1881, in the German Empire, a mediatised nobleman's marriage to Lothar's granddaughter would have been deemed morganatic, and the count's trafficking in commerce considered an act of social derogation for a member of the Hochadel, so Alexander renounced his birth rank prior to the marriage. He was granted the new hereditary title of Graf (Count) von Faber-Castell by Luitpold, Prince Regent of Bavaria, for the descendants of his marriage to the Faber heiress. Although Alexander and Ottilie divorced in 1918, the Faber business trust had conferred headship of the company on Alexander, who even kept the Fabers' renovated palace at Stein (which would be commandeered to billet journalists during the Nuremberg trials, including Ernest Hemingway and John Steinbeck).

In 1927, Alexander resumed his original name for himself, his second wife (born a countess, Margit Zedtwitz von Moravan und Duppau, 1886–1973), and their son, Radulf (1922–2004). Alexander's issue by his first marriage had never been considered dynasts of the House of Castell, but they inherited the vast Faber fortune and continue to include 'Castell' in their surname with the comital title. Alexander and Ottilie's only son, Roland Lothar Wolfgang Christian Ernst Wilhelm Graf von Faber-Castell (1905–1978), inherited the headship of the Faber-Castell companies from his parents.

=== Family ===
The immensely wealthy Lothar Faber was ennobled in 1861 and made Baron von Faber in the Kingdom of Bavaria in 1881. The sons of his only son Wilhelm (1851–1893) (by his wife Bertha Faber (1856-1940), daughter of Lothar's younger brother, Eberhard (1822-1879), who had founded the New York branch of the company) having died young, a marriage for his granddaughter and heiress Ottilie was arranged with a scion of one of Germany's formerly ruling comital dynasties. Yet in the conservative German Empire of fin-de-siècle Europe, the marriage of a Faber into a family of the high nobility was regarded as too bold a leap upward socially. A morganatic marriage would have been required, and the Faber pencil works could not have remained in the hands of their descendants because trafficking in commerce was still considered an act of social derogation among members of the Hochadel.

To resolve this dilemma, the chosen groom, Count Alexander von Castell-Rüdenhausen (1866–1928) renounced his birth rank prior to the marriage. The Castell family had been Imperial counts in Franconia, known since the 11th century. When the Holy Roman Empire was dissolved under pressure from Napoleon I in 1806, the Castell lands were annexed by the Kingdom of Bavaria. Although deprived of sovereignty, in 1815 the Castells were mediatized, their rank with the reigning dynasties of Europe being formally recognized, and family would be granted the hereditary title of Prince.

Count Alexander, a younger son of the first prince, married the pencil heiress, Baroness Ottilie von Faber (1877–1944), in 1898. He was granted the new hereditary title of Count von Faber-Castell in Bavaria for the descendants of their marriage. Although Alexander and Ottilie divorced in 1918, the Faber business trust had transferred headship of the company to Alexander, who even kept the Fabers' renovated palace at Stein (which would be commandeered to billet journalists during the Nuremberg trials, including Ernest Hemingway and John Steinbeck).

In 1927 Alexander resumed his original name for himself, his second wife (born a countess, Margit Zedtwitz von Moravan und Duppau, 1886–1973), and their son, Count Radulf (1922–2004). His issue by the first marriage had never been considered dynasts of the House of Castell, but they inherited the vast Faber fortune and continue to include Castell in their name with the comital title.

Various branches of the family continued to flourish, but the Faber and Faber-Castell corporate holdings usually passed to the eldest male of the patrilineage. Alexander and Ottilie's only son, Roland Graf von Faber-Castell (1905–1978), inherited headship of the Faber-Castell companies from his parents. His eldest son, Hubertus Graf von Faber-Castell, left the family business after a dispute with his father and was succeeded by his younger brother, Anton-Wolfgang (1941-2016). As the first born, Hubertus inherited the majority of the family's assets, yet sold most of his company shares to his successor, after leaving the company. Hubertus joined his maternal family business Sal Oppenheim. The company stakes made Hubertus a billionaire. Anton Wolfgang Graf von Faber-Castell left a son, Charles Alexander von Faber-Castell (born in Zürich 20 June 1980), of his 1986 marriage to Carla Mathilde Lamesch. His widow, Mary Hogan (born 1951), continues as managing director of Faber-Castell's cosmetics division. His three daughters, Katharina Elizabeth (born 5 May 1988), and twins Sarah Angela and Victoria Maria (born 1 August 1996), succeed him.

Hubertus's daughter, Floria-Franziska Gräfin von Faber-Castell, (b. 1974) was married at Kronberg on 17 May 2003 in a much-publicised wedding attended by members of Europe's reigning families, to Donatus, Landgrave of Hesse, a great-grandson of King Victor Emmanuel III of Italy and a grand-nephew of Princess Sophie of Greece and Denmark, sister of Britain's prince consort Philip, Duke of Edinburgh. His second daughter is German-Swiss philanthropist Caroline von Faber-Castell, who is married to Düsseldorf-based entrepreneur Michael Gotzens. Patrick von Faber-Castell publicly married German actress Mariella Ahrens in Faber-Castell Castle, near Nuremberg. The siblings own one of the most important collections of silver and jewelry in Germany. Most of the pieces are available to the public in various German museums. The private collection has been recorded by the Kunstmuseum Köln and has been published under the name "Ein Rheinischer Silber Schatz – Schmuck und Gerät aus Privatbesitz" ("A Rhenish Silver Treasure – Privately Owned Jewellery and Equipment").

== Other items ==
Castell, Texas in the USA is named after Count Carl Frederick Christian of Castell-Castell (1801–1850), who was the Vice President and Business Manager at the beginning of the Adelsverein, a German settlement organization.

The present heads of the existing two branches are Albrecht, Prince of Castell-Castell and Otto Friedrich, Prince of Castell-Rüdenhausen.

== Literature ==
- Almanach de Gotha, Gotha 1901 and 1930.
