= Carl Parrot =

German physician and ornithologist

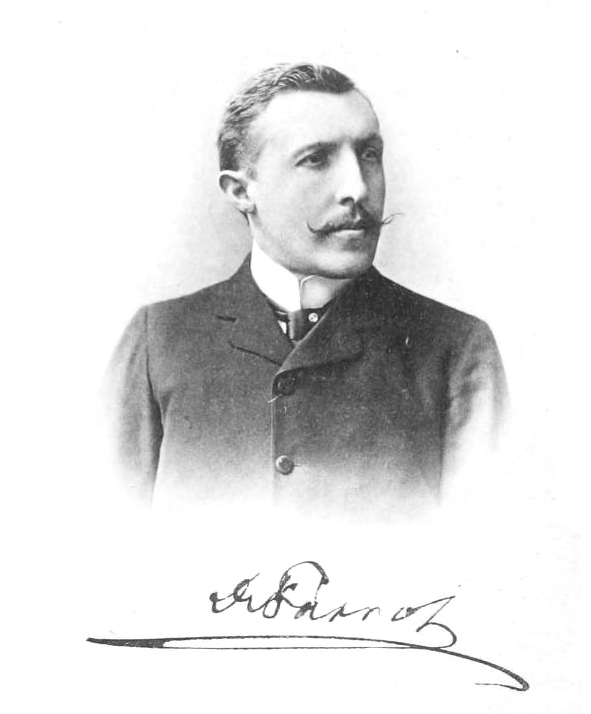
- Born: 1 February 1867; Castell, Bavaria
- Died: 28 January 1911 (aged 43); Munich
- Education: Berlin, Vienna, Munich
- Known for: Founder of the Ornithological Society of Bavaria
- Scientific career
- Fields: Gynaecology, ornithology, systematics
- Institutions: Munich (as gynaecologist)

Carl Philip August Parrot (1 February 1867, Castell – 28 January 1911, Munich) was a German physician and ornithologist who founded the Ornithological Society of Bavaria.

Parrot was born in Castell, Lower Franconia, Kingdom of Bavaria to physician Jean Parrot. He studied medicine at Berlin, Vienna and Munich, and after obtaining an M.D. in 1894 practiced in Munich as a gynaecologist. From an early age he was interested in natural history and took a special interest in the distribution and migration of birds. In 1897 he founded the "Ornithologische Verein Muenchen" which later became the Ornithological Society of Bavaria that he presided over until his death. Although a field ornithologist, he also worked on systematics and examined a collection from the Island of Banka and Deli in Sumatra.
