= Wiesentheid (Verwaltungsgemeinschaft) =

- Verwaltungsgemeinschaft
- Location of Wiesentheid within Kitzingen district
- Interactive map of Wiesentheid
- Location within Germany Location within Bavaria
- Coordinates: 49°48′N 10°21′E
- Country: Germany
- State: Bavaria
- Admin. region: Lower Franconia
- District: Kitzingen
- Seat: Wiesentheid
- Subdivisions: 4 municipalities

Area
  - Total: 75.98 km^{2} (29.34 sq mi)

Population (2025-12-31)
  - Total: 7,414
  - Density: 97.58/km^{2} (252.7/sq mi)
- Time zone: UTC+01:00 (CET)
  - Summer (DST): UTC+02:00 (CEST)
- Website: vgem-wiesentheid.de

Wiesentheid is a Verwaltungsgemeinschaft (municipal association) in the district of Kitzingen in Bavaria, Germany. Its seat is in Wiesentheid.

It consists of the following municipalities:

1. Abtswind
2. Castell
3. Rüdenhausen
4. Wiesentheid
