= Abtswind =

- Municipality
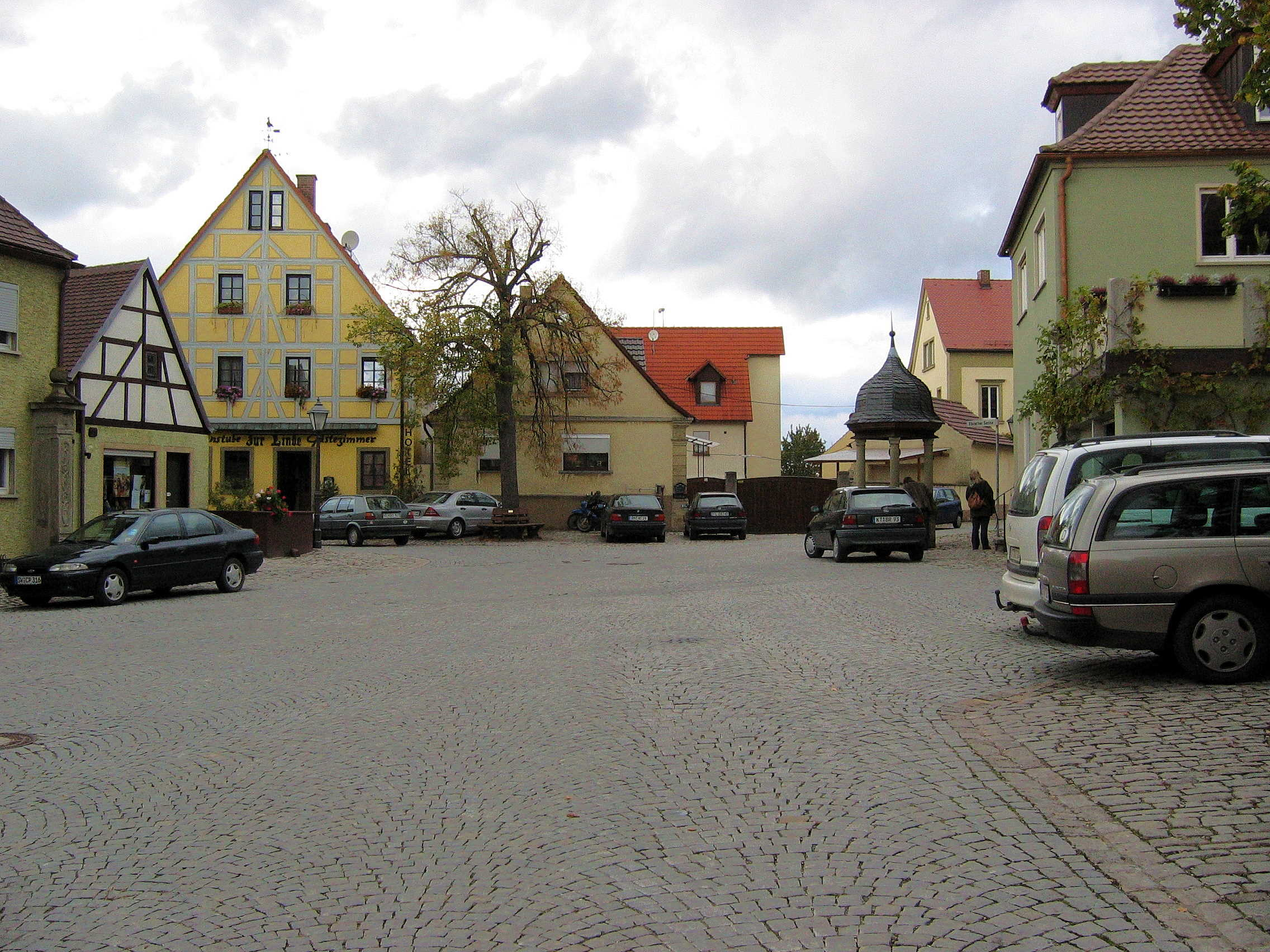
- Central square in Abtswind

- Coat of arms

- Location of Abtswind within Kitzingen district
- Interactive map of Abtswind
- Location within Germany Location within Bavaria
- Coordinates: 49°46′N 10°22′E
- Country: Germany
- State: Bavaria
- Admin. region: Unterfranken
- District: Kitzingen
- Municipal assoc.: Wiesentheid

Government
  - Mayor (2020–26): Jürgen Schulz

Area
  - Total: 12.81 km^{2} (4.95 sq mi)
- Elevation: 291 m (955 ft)

Population (2025-12-31)
  - Total: 837
  - Density: 65.3/km^{2} (169/sq mi)
- Time zone: UTC+01:00 (CET)
  - Summer (DST): UTC+02:00 (CEST)
- Postal codes: 97355
- Dialling codes: 09383
- Vehicle registration: KT
- Website: www.abtswind.de

Abtswind is a municipality in the district of Kitzingen in Bavaria in Germany.
