= Castell-Castell =

County in the Holy Roman Empire

Coordinates: 49.7416°N 10.3499°E

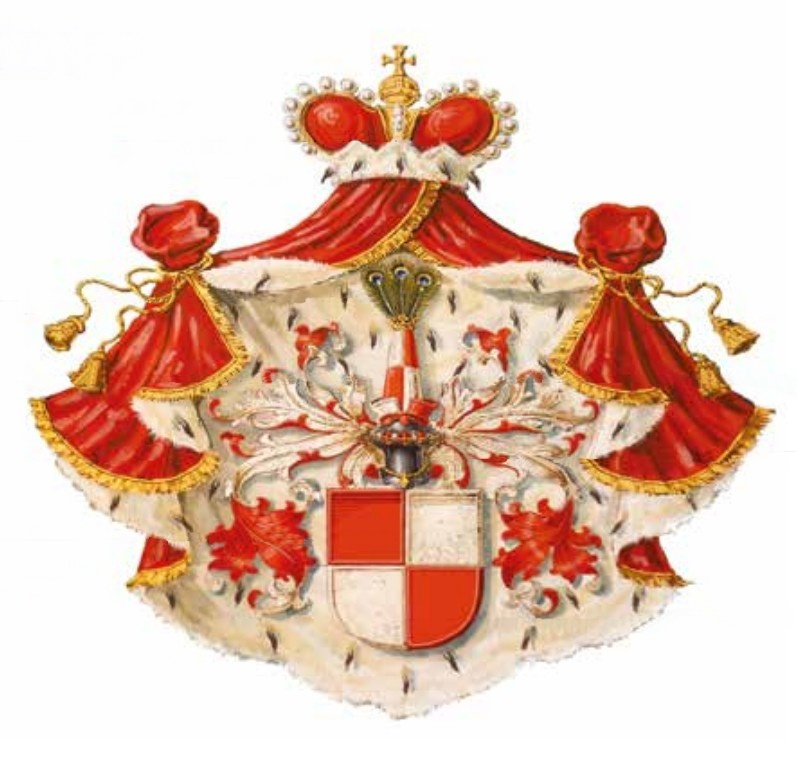
Princely coat of arms of the Castell-Castell family, 1901

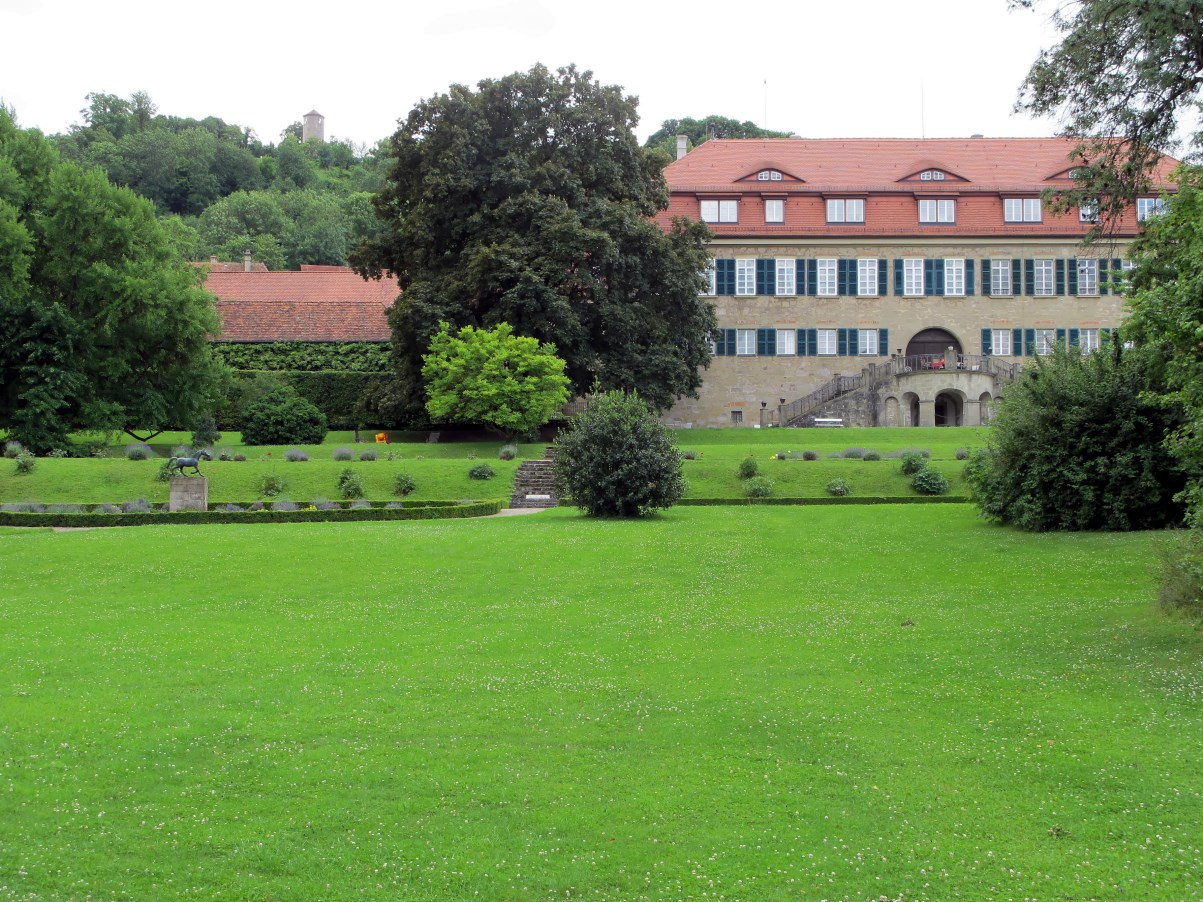
Castell Castle

Castell-Castell was a county in the Holy Roman Empire, ruled by a branch of the Counts of Castell. It was established as a partition of Castell-Remlingen in 1668, and it was partitioned between itself and Castell in 1709. It annexed the County of Castell in 1772, and was mediatised to Bavaria in 1806.

On 7 March 1901 the Castell-Castell branch, along with the one of Castell-Rüdenhausen line were raised to the hereditary rank of Prince in primogeniture with the style of Serene Highness by Luitpold, Prince Regent of Bavaria.

== Counts of Castell-Castell (1668–1806) ==
- Wolfgang Theodoric (1668–1709)
- Augustus Francis Frederick (1709–1767) reigned mutually with
- Charles Frederick Gottlieb (Count of Castell-Remlingen) (1709–1717) and
- Wolfgang George II (1709–1736) and
- Christian Frederick Charles (Count of Castell-Rüdenhausen) (1736–1773)
- Albert Frederick Charles (1773–1806) mutually with
- Christian Frederick (later Count of Castell-Rüdenhausen) (1773–1803)

== (Mediatized) Counts of Castell-Castell ==
- Friedrich Ludwig (1810–1875)
- Carl (1875–1886)
- Friedrich Carl (1886–1901)

== (Mediatized) Princes of Castell-Castell ==
- Friedrich Carl, Count 1886–1901, 1st Prince 1901–1923 (1864–1923), married 1895 Countess Gertrud of Stolberg-Wernigerode
  - Carl, 2nd Prince 1923–1945 (1897–1945), married Princess Anna-Agnes of Solms-Hohensolms-Lich
    - Albrecht, 3rd Prince 1945–2016 (1925–2016), married Marie Luise, Princess of Waldeck and Pyrmont
      - Ferdinand, 4th Prince 2016–present (born 1965), married Countess Marie-Gabrielle of Degenfeld-Schonburg
        - Carl, Hereditary Count of Castell-Castell (born 2001)
        - Count Johannes (born 2011)
