= Castell-Rüdenhausen =

County of the Holy Roman Empire

Coordinates: 49.7665°N 10.3395°E

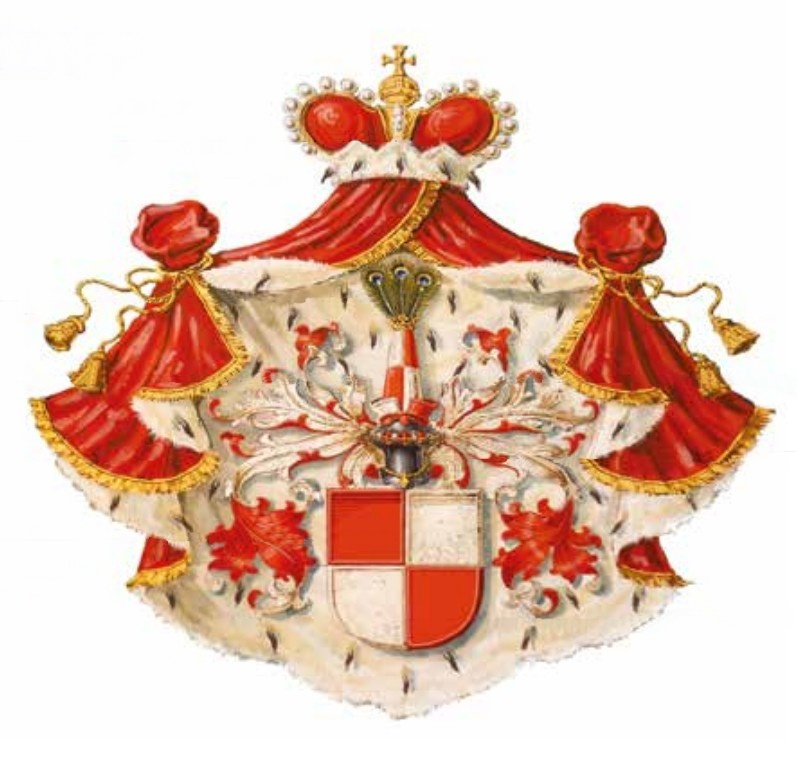
Princely coat of arms of the Castell-Rüdenhausen family, 1901

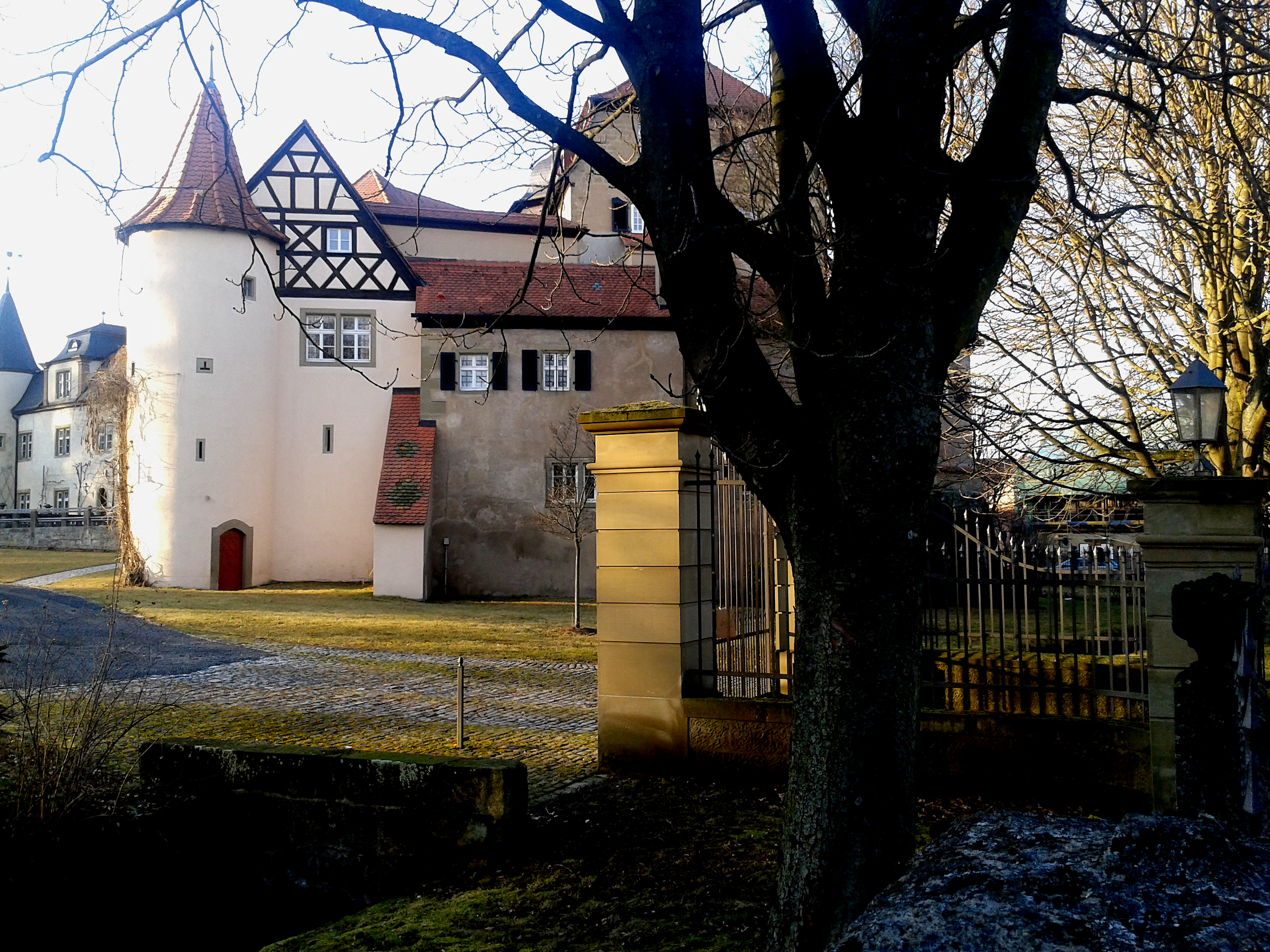
Rüdenhausen Castle

Castell-Rüdenhausen was a county of the Holy Roman Empire in the region of Franconia in northern Bavaria. It was created in 1597 as a partition of Castell and was ruled by a branch of the Counts of Castell. In 1806, it was mediatised to Bavaria.

On 7 March 1901, both branches of the family were raised to the hereditary rank of prince in primogeniture with the style of Serene Highness by Luitpold, Prince Regent of Bavaria. A morganatic branch of this princely house is the comital Faber-Castell family.

== Counts of Castell-Rüdenhausen (1597) ==
- Godfrey (1597–1635)
- George Frederick (1635–1653)
- Philip Godfrey (1653–1681)
- John Frederick (1681–1749)
- Frederick Louis (1749–1803)
- Christian Frederick (previously Count of Castell-Castell) (1803–1806)

== (Mediatized) Counts of Castell-Rüdenhausen (1806) ==
- Christian Frederick (1806–1850)
- Wolfgang (1850–1901)

== (Mediatized) Princes of Castell-Rüdenhausen (1901) ==
- Wolfgang, Count 1850–1901, 1st Prince 1901–1913 (1830–1913), m. Princess Emma of Ysenburg and Büdingen
  - Casimir, 2nd Prince 1913–1933 (1861–1933), m. Countess Mechtild of Bentinck
    - Rupert, 3rd Prince 1933–1944 (1910–1944)
    - Siegfried, 4th Prince 1944–2007 (1916–2007), m. Countess Irene of Solms-Laubach
      - Johann-Friedrich, 5th Prince 2007–2014 (1948–2014), m. Countess Maria of Schönborn-Wiesentheid
        - Otto, 6th Prince 2014–present (b. 1985), m. Sophia Mautner von Markhof
          - Lelio Johann-Friedrich Theodor (b. 13 October 2020)
