= Rüdenhausen =

- Municipality
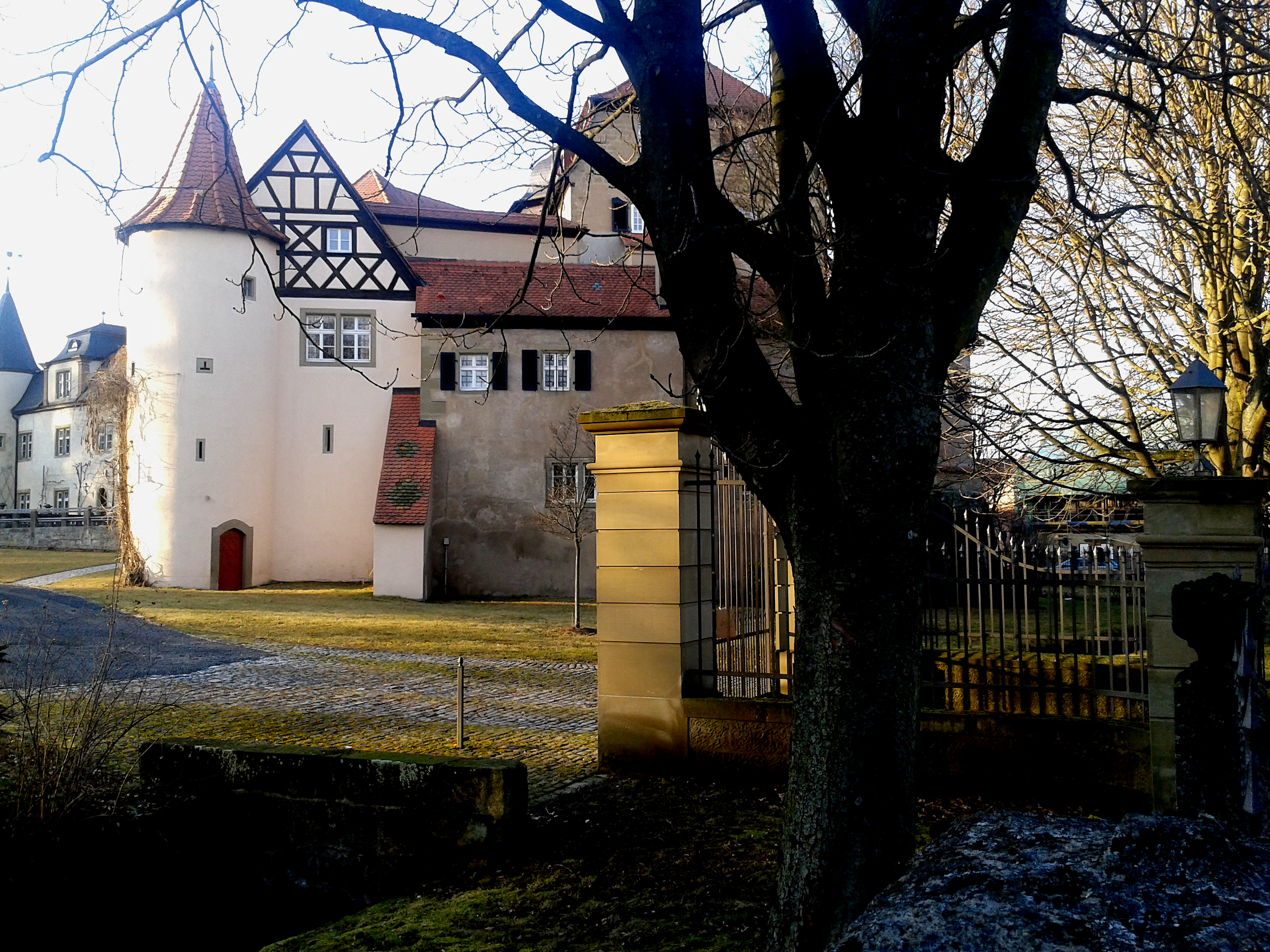
- Rüdenhausen Castle

- Coat of arms

- Location of Rüdenhausen within Kitzingen district
- Interactive map of Rüdenhausen
- Location within Germany Location within Bavaria
- Coordinates: 49°46′N 10°21′E
- Country: Germany
- State: Bavaria
- Admin. region: Unterfranken
- District: Kitzingen
- Municipal assoc.: Wiesentheid

Government
  - Mayor (2020–26): Gerhard Ackermann

Area
  - Total: 6.88 km^{2} (2.66 sq mi)
- Elevation: 264 m (866 ft)

Population (2025-12-31)
  - Total: 852
  - Density: 124/km^{2} (321/sq mi)
- Time zone: UTC+01:00 (CET)
  - Summer (DST): UTC+02:00 (CEST)
- Postal codes: 97355
- Dialling codes: 09383
- Vehicle registration: KT
- Website: www.ruedenhausen.de

Rüdenhausen is a market town and municipality in the district of Kitzingen in Bavaria in Germany.
