= County of Castell =

Coordinates: 49°45′N 10°20′E

Castell was a county of northern Bavaria, Germany, comprising a string of territories in the historical region of Franconia, both east and west of Würzburg. It was ruled by the Counts of Castell.

Little is known about the noble House of Castell, although they were the counts of Kreis Gerolzhofen, Regierungsbezirk, and Unterfranken of Bavaria. They were a member of the Fränkische Grafenkolleg ("Franconian Counts College"). The two main branches of the House of Castell were Castell-Remlingen (Protestant) and Castell-Rüdenhausen (Protestant and Catholic).

Castell was composed of three territories (Flecken) and 28 villages, with about 10,000 inhabitants at the time of mediatisation. The County of Castell joined Bavaria in 1806.

== Partitions of Castell ==
- Castell-Remlingen (1597–1806)
  - later split into Castell-Castell (1668–1806)
- Castell-Rüdenhausen (1597–1806)
