= Fürst (surname) =

Fürst (Fuerst) and Furst are surnames which may refer to:

- Alan Furst (born 1941), Jewish American novelist
- Anton Furst (1944–1991), production designer
- Artur Fürst (1880–1926), German-Jewish writer
- Caleb Furst (born 2002), American basketball player
- Carl Magnus Fürst (1854–1935), Swedish anatomist and anthropologist
- Chajim Fürst (1592–1653), Danish-German merchant
- Christiane Fürst (born 1985), German volleyball player
- Edmund Fürst (1874–1955), German-Israeli painter and illustrator
- Gebhard Fürst (born 1948), Bishop of Rottenburg-Stuttgart
- Griff Furst (born 1981), actor and director
- Hans Furst (1890–1967), Austrian professional wrestler and matchmaker
- János Fürst (1935–2007), Hungarian-Jewish conductor
- Joseph Fürst (1916–2005), Austrian actor
- Julius Fürst (1805–1873), German-Jewish orientalist
- Lilian R. Furst (1931–2009), Austrian-born British-American literary scholar
- Michael Furst (1856–1934), American lawyer
- Moritz Fuerst (1782–1840), Jewish American artist
- Moses Israel Fürst (?–1692), German Jewish merchant
- Nathan Furst (born 1978), composer
- Paula Fürst (1894–1942), German-Jewish educator and Zionist
- Rafe Furst (born 1968) American entrepreneur and writer
- Stephen Furst (1954–2017), actor and director
- Steve Furst (born 1967), comedian and actor
- Walter Fürst (?–1317), Swiss patriot

== See also ==
- First (disambiguation)
