= Albert von Keller =

German painter

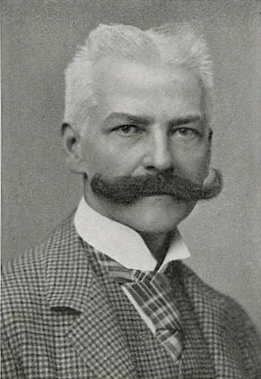
Albert von Keller (1904)

Albert von Keller (27 April 1844 in Gais, Switzerland – 14 July 1920 in Munich, Germany) was a German painter of Swiss ancestry. He specialized in portraits and indoor scenes. Female figures are a prominent feature of his work.

== Biography ==
Keller was born in Gais, Switzerland. He was one of eight children born to Caroline Keller, who was divorced at the time of his birth. As was customary, she had resumed the use of her maiden name. Her ex-husband's brother may have been his true father. When he was three, after several moves, the family settled in Bayreuth where he attended primary school and took piano lessons. In 1852, his mother became a citizen of Bavaria and, by extension, so did he. Sometime in mid-1854, they relocated to Munich, and he was enrolled at the Maximiliansgymnasium. He graduated in 1863 and transferred to the Ludwig-Maximilians-Universität München to study law.

After 1865, he decided to pursue a career in art instead, but spent only a short time at the Academy of Fine Arts. He made numerous study trips throughout Germany, France, Italy and the Low Countries. From 1867, he worked at several different studios throughout Munich, including that of Arthur von Ramberg, where he drew nude studies. He had his first showing at the Glaspalast in 1869 and became a member of Allotria, an artists' association, in 1873.

In 1878, he married Irene von Eichthal (1858–1907), great-granddaughter of the Bavarian Court Banker, Aron Elias Seligmann, Freiherr von Eichthal. He would eventually paint over forty portraits of her. Their first son died as an infant. Their second son, Balthasar, was born in 1884, but died in 1906, shortly before his mother.

He exhibited at the Salon for the first time in 1883, while living in Paris. In 1886, he became a member of the new "Munich Psychological Society"; actually a group devoted to the paranormal, founded by Albert von Schrenck-Notzing. Soon he began representing parapsychological motifs, connected to Christian themes, with visions and hallucinations. In 1892, he was one of the co-founders of the Munich Secession and served as vice president from 1904 to 1920. He was also a board member of the Deutscher Künstlerbund. In 1898, he received the Knight's Cross of the Order of Merit of the Bavarian Crown, which entitled him to use the noble "von" in his name.

He died on 14 July 1920 in Munich. He and his wife Irene are interred at the Alter Südfriedhof there.

== Selected paintings ==
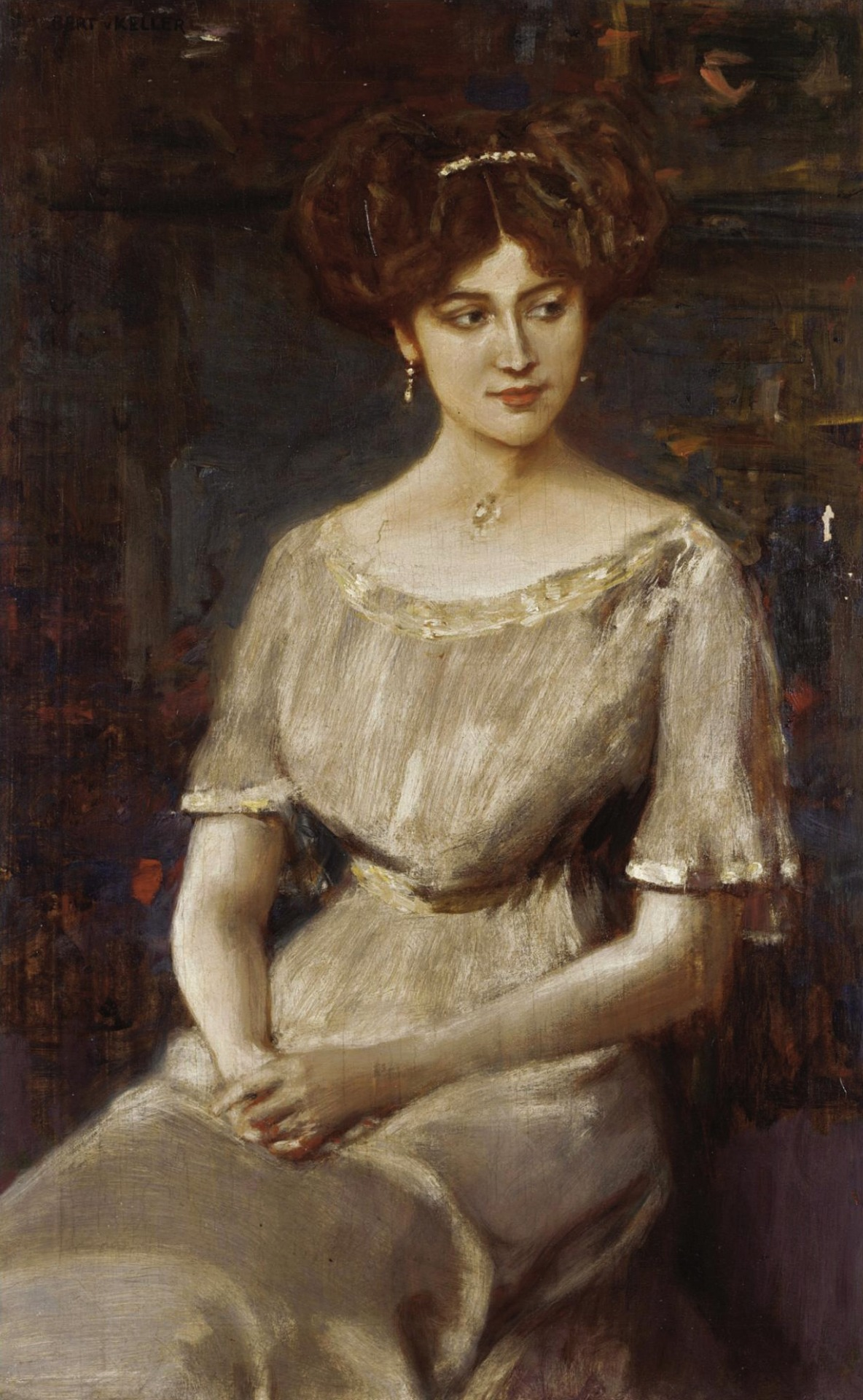
Portrait of Elisabeth von Wichmann

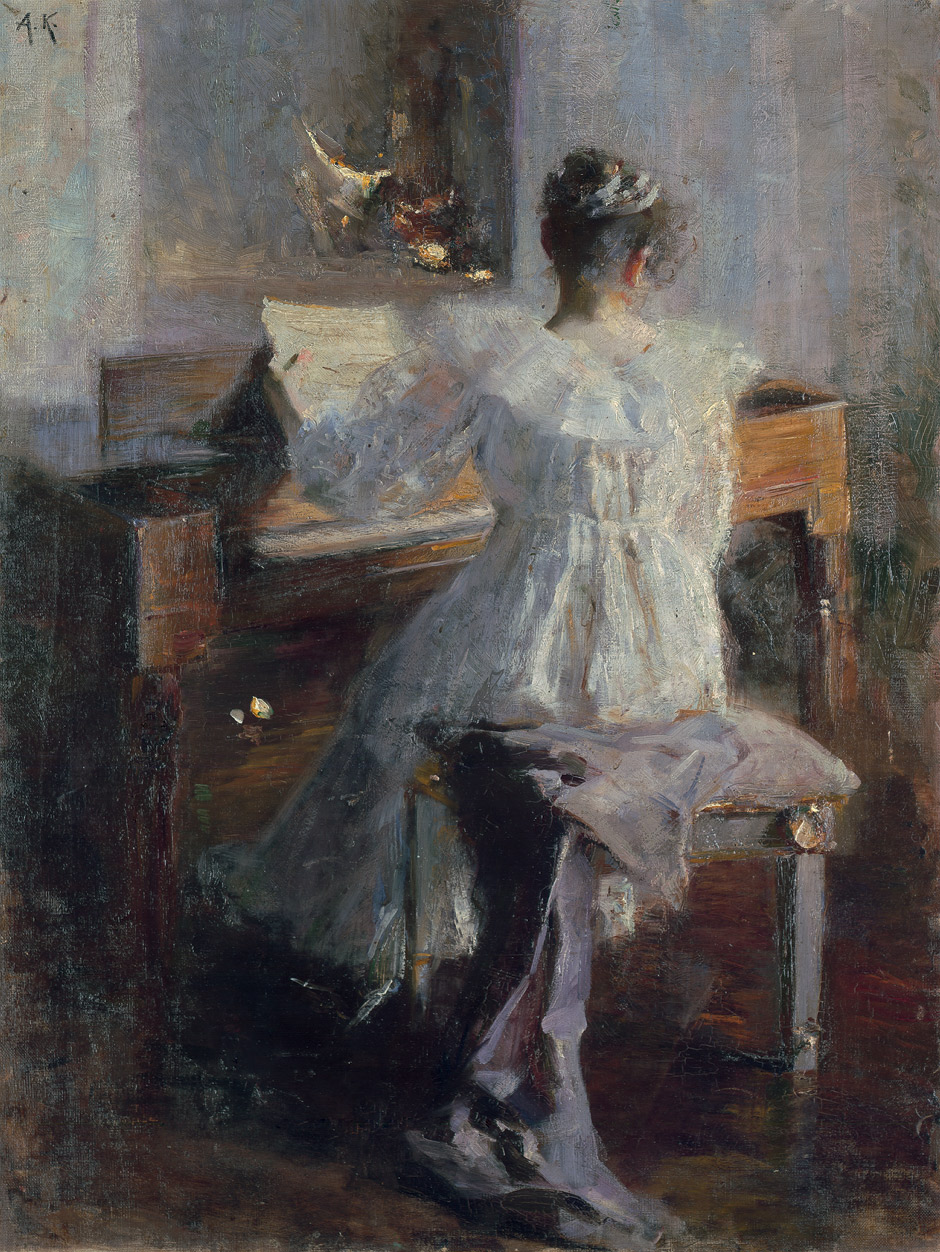
The Pianist

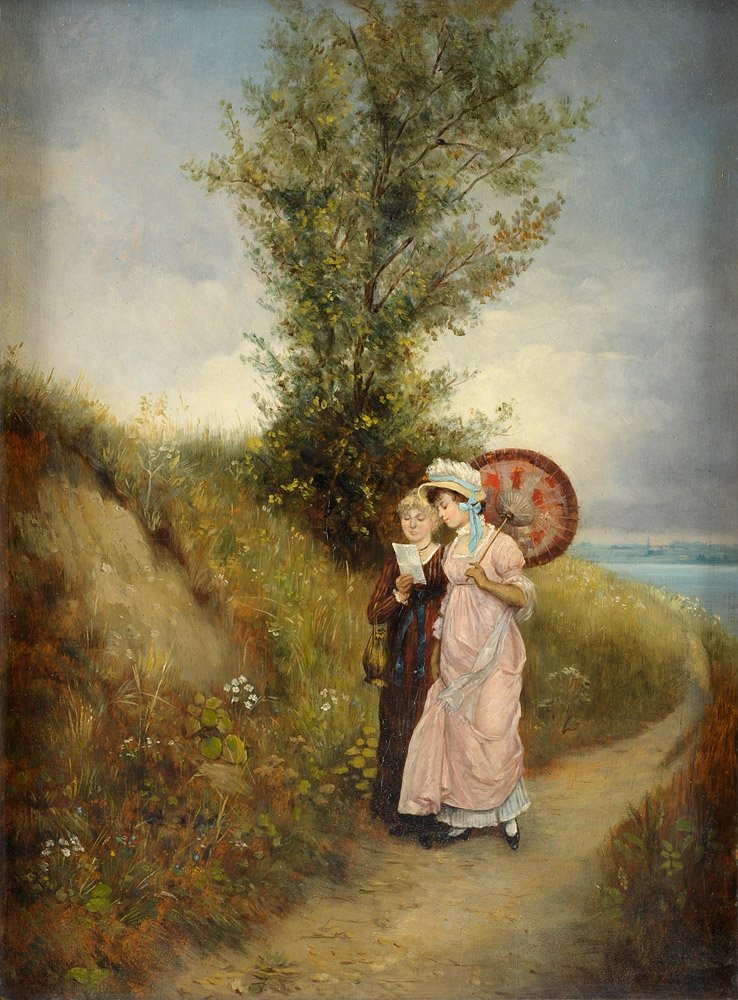
The Sunday Walk, 1886

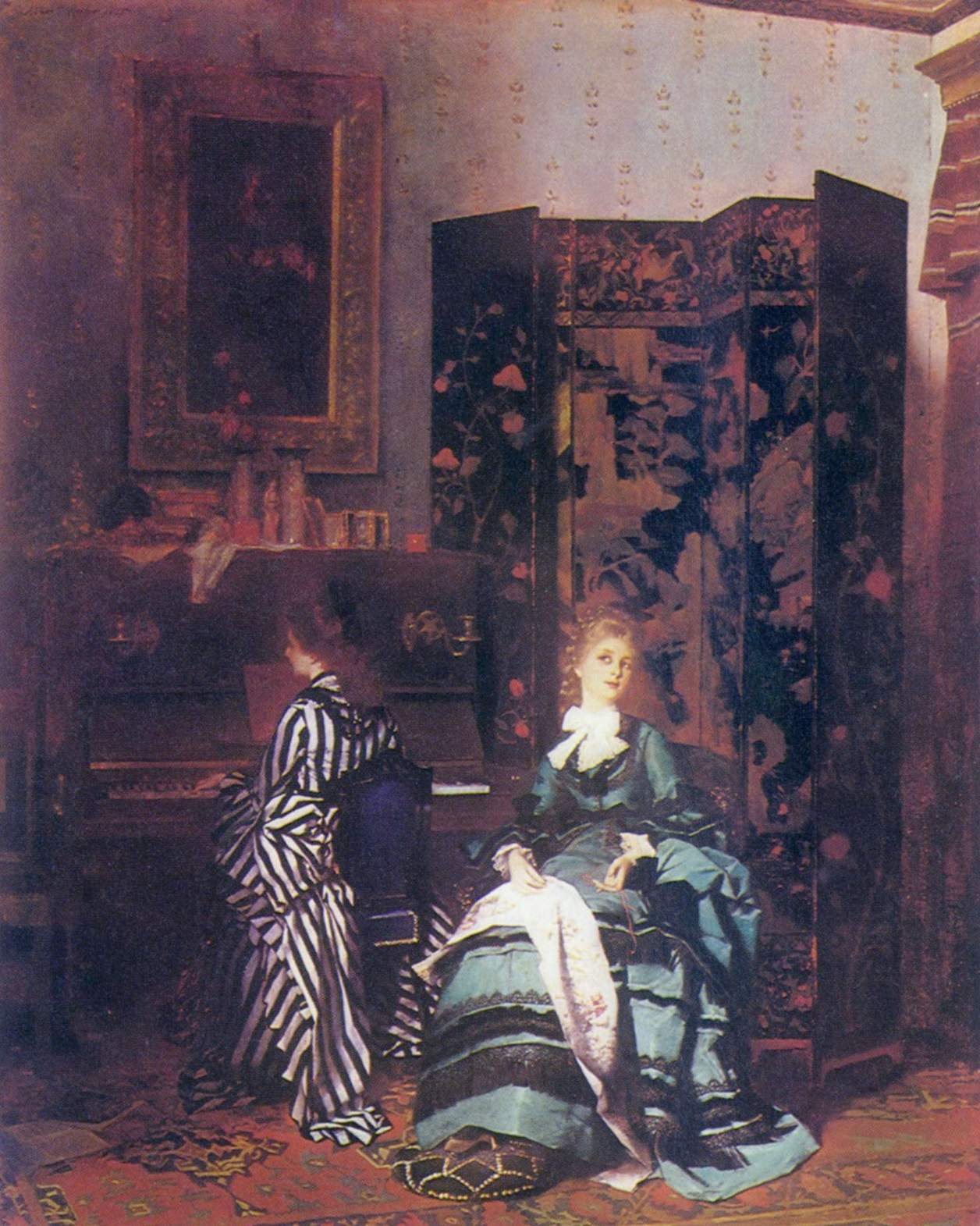
Chopin, 1873

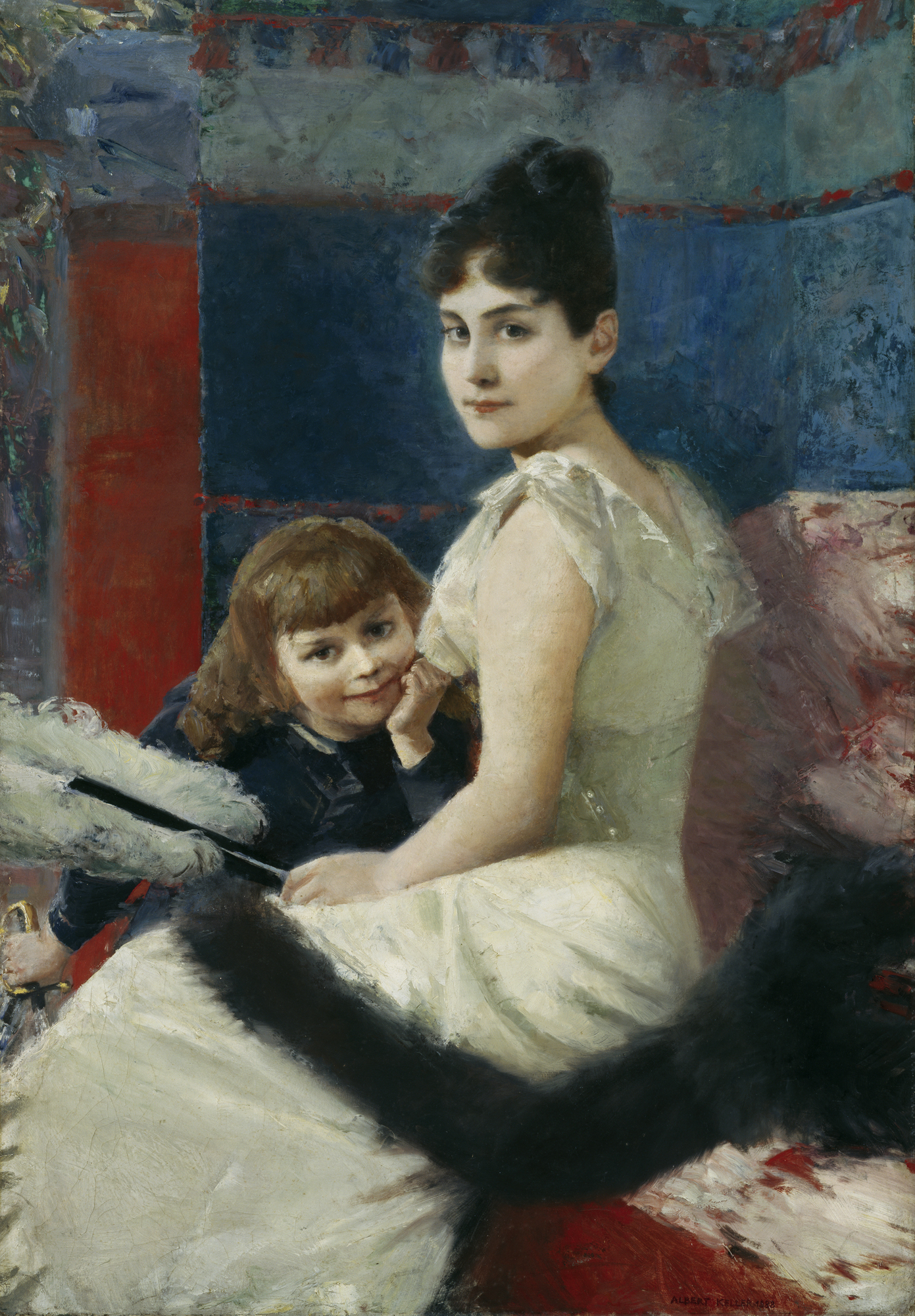
Irene von Keller with her son Balthasar, 1888
