= Philippine Kaskele =

German Court Jew banker

Philippine Kaskele (1742–1811), was a German Court Jew banker. She took over the position of hoffaktoren or banker of the Court of Saxony from her spouse Jacob Kaskele in 1788–1808 during the minority of her son Michael Kaskel.
