= Useful Jew =

Historical term

The term useful Jew was used in various historical contexts, typically describing a Jew useful in implementing an official authority's policy, sometimes by oppressing other Jews.

- In 1744, Frederick II of Prussia introduced the practice of limiting Jewish population to a small number of the most wealthy families, known as Schutzjuden ("protected Jews"). The first-born son in such families inherited this privilege; other children were considered useless by the authorities and had the choice of either abstaining from marriage or leaving.
- Following the establishment of the Pale of Settlement by Imperial Russia, only "useful Jews" (Russian: полезные евреи) were allowed to live outside the Pale; these included Jews such as wealthy first-rung merchants (Russian: купцы первой гильдии), persons who had received higher education, cantonists (after serving their full term in the army), and some other categories.
- In the Soviet Union, Jewish members of the Anti-Zionist Committee of the Soviet Public were colloquially known as "useful Jews" or "pocket Jews" (Russian: карманные евреи), implying their corruption by high positions in the state hierarchy.
- In Israel and among its supporters, along with the term "useful Jews", the term "useful idiots" is often used to describe anti-Zionist/post-Zionist Jews who stand against the Jewish state.

== See also ==
- Court Jew
- Jewish question
- Self-hating Jew
- Shtadlan
- Uncle Tom
- Useful idiot
- Kapo
- Judenrat
- Yevsektsiya
- Jewish collaboration with Nazi Germany
  - Jewish Ghetto Police
  - Group 13
  - Chaim Rumkowski
  - Stella Kübler
