= Samson Wertheimer =

Austrian rabbi and financier

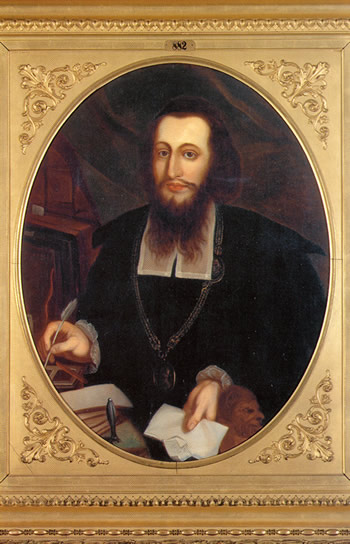
- Rabbi Samson Wertheimer (1658–1724)

Personal life
- Born: 17 January 1658 Worms, Holy Roman Empire
- Died: 6 August 1724 (aged 66) Vienna, Austria

Religious life
- Religion: Judaism

Samson Wertheimer (17 January 1658 – 6 August 1724) was chief rabbi of Hungary and Moravia, and rabbi of Eisenstadt. He was also a powerful Austrian financier, court Jew and shtadlan to Austrian Emperor Leopold I. With the help of Samuel Oppenheimer, he helped finance the Spanish War of Succession on behalf of the Empire.

A scholar and patron of scholars, he also financed the printing of the Babylonian Talmud undertaken at Frankfurt (1712–22) by his son-in-law, Moses Kann. Wertheimer possessed numerous palaces and ten imperial soldiers guarded his house. He was known by the title of Judenkaiser (Jewish emperor).

The Wertheimer family established branches in several European nations.

Famous descendants include billionaire Gerard Wertheimer and billionaire Alain Weirtheimer, little is known about them according to French media.

== Family ==
Wertheimer was born in Worms, the son of Joseph Josel Wertheimer (1626 – 2 May 1713), and received his education at the yeshivas of Worms and Frankfurt am Main.

== Supplied the Imperial Army ==
He arrived in Vienna on 2 December 1684 and associated himself with the banker Samuel Oppenheimer, sharing the latter's privilege of residence. During the absence of Oppenheimer, Wertheimer represented him in transactions with the Austrian government. Wertheimer soon gained the confidence of Emperor Leopold I, who presented a portrait of himself to Wertheimer and his son Wolf, and on 15 December 1701 followed this gift with another of 1,000 ducats for the financier's success in obtaining for the daughter of the King of Poland a dowry of 1,000,000 florins from her father upon her marriage to Leopold's brother-in-law Duke Charles Philip.

In the Spanish War of Succession, Wertheimer united with Samuel Oppenheimer to procure the money necessary for the equipment of the Imperial Army and for the supply of provisions. After Oppenheimer's failure, and his sudden death in 1703, Wertheimer maintained the credit of the state and found new sources of income. On 29 August 1703 the emperor appointed him court factor, and extended for twenty years his privileges of free religious worship, denizenship, and immunity from taxation. Joseph I, who succeeded his father on 5 May 1705, confirmed Wertheimer's title and privileges.

Under Emperor Joseph I, Wertheimer maintained his position as a financier and creditor of the state. He was in personal relations with Prince Eugene of Savoy, to whom he paid 300,000 florins promised by Joseph I, Charles VI adding another 100,000 florins. During the Turkish war Wertheimer made large loans to the government. The title of "Landesrabbiner", which the Jews of Hungary had bestowed on Wertheimer, was made effective by Charles VI (26 August 1711). Wertheimer, according to a contemporary account of one of his relatives, Abraham Levi, was called the "Judenkaiser." Ten imperial soldiers stood as sentinels before his house. He possessed many of the palaces and gardens in Vienna, and numerous estates and houses in Germany, e.g., in Frankfurt am Main, Worms, and other cities. He established schools, and distributed large amounts of money in Europe and in the Holy Land. Alien Jews were not allowed to remain over night in Vienna without a written permit from him.

== Rabbinical knowledge ==
Wertheimer did not discontinue his rabbinical studies. In a manuscript volume he left a number of derashot that he had delivered in the private synagogue in his house; these show considerable Talmudic erudition. He delivered many funeral sermons on the deaths of distinguished rabbis, as Simchah Cohen and David ben Israel, rabbi of Trebitsch and son-in-law of Rabbi Menachem Krochmal, Rabbi of Nikolsburg. From far and near, questions of religion, particularly of ritual, were submitted to him and to the rabbinical court over which he presided; and to the latter he called such great authorities as Jacob Eliezer Braunschweig, Simeon ben Judah Löb Jalles of Kraków, and Alexander ben Menahem ha-Levi of Prossnitz. Rabbi Yair Bacharach ("Chavot Yair") said about Rav Wertheimer that "since the days of Rav Ashi of the Talmud, there was no one who possessed Torah and Gedulah B'Makom Echad (Torah and secular greatness in one place) as did Rav Wertheimer." Wertheimer was widely regarded as the greatest sage ('Gadol Hador') of his time.

== As patron of the arts ==
Moses Meïr Perls, for many years Wertheimer's secretary and almoner, mentions him in his "Megillat Sefer" (1709) as "a rabbi of great congregations in Israel." In some works Wertheimer is called "rabbi of Prague and Bohemia"; but he did not accept this title, as may be seen in an edition of Alfasi (Frankfurt am Main, 1699–1700). His reputation spread even to the Orient, where he was described as a "prince of the Holy Land" and given the title of "rabbi of Hebron and Safed". His native city also honored him with the title of rabbi. Many authors sought his "approbation", but only in a few cases did he give it, e.g., in Moses ben Menahem's Va-Yachal Mosheh, and Rabbi Yair Bacharach's "Chavath Yair." He contributed liberally toward the publication of such works as "Chavath Yair" (in which his name appears with that of Samuel Oppenheimer), Rabbi Yehudah ben Nisan's "Beth Yehudah", Rabbi Gershon Ashkenazi's "Avodath ha-Gershuni" and "Tif'ereth ha-Gershuni" (in which David Oppenheimer also is mentioned). He and his son-in-law Moses Kann bore the greater part of the expense of printing the Babylonian Talmud in Frankfurt am Main in 1712-22; this excellent edition was confiscated and for thirty years kept under lock and key (see Kann, Moses).

When Eisenmenger's Entdecktes Judenthum appeared in Frankfurt in 1700, Wertheimer addressed to Emperor Leopold a petition in which he warned of the grave dangers which it would bring upon the Jews. Accordingly, the 2,000 copies of the book were confiscated, and for years its sale was forbidden.

When, in consequence of Rákóczy's insurrection (1708), the Jewish congregation of Eisenstadt had been dispersed and the wealthier members had taken refuge in Vienna, Wertheimer persuaded them to return or to help their poorer brethren rebuild the congregation. He himself built for them in Eisenstadt a house and an attractive synagogue, still called "Samson's Schule." He lent his aid also in establishing about forty congregations in Hungary. In Frankfurt am Main he founded and richly endowed a Talmudical school, at whose head was his son-in-law Moses Kann.

== Legacy ==
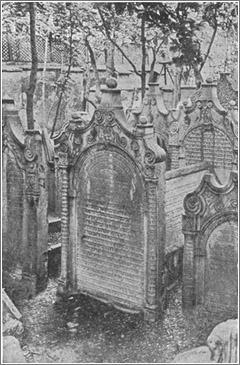
Grave and tombstone of Samson Wertheimer in Vienna's oldest cemetery on Seegasse.

By the marriages of his children Wertheimer became connected with the most prominent families of Austria and Germany. His stepson Isaac Nathan Oppenheimer married a daughter of the wealthy purveyor Pösing; his eldest son, Wolf, married a daughter of Emanuel Oppenheimer.

Wertheimer died, aged 66, in Vienna.

Wolf was an active agent in his father's financial transactions, and shared his dignity as court factor. He later experienced great reverses of fortune, however. Having invested a large part of his wealth in loans to the Bavarian government, the stipulated terms of repayment were not kept, and bankruptcy stared him in the face. For a time he was able to pay only half of the interest on the 150,000 florins which Samson Wertheimer had donated to charity, and of which Wolf was trustee. On his father's donation of 22,000 florins in favor of the German Jews in Palestine he did not pay any interest after 1733. His embarrassment was ended by Elector Maximilian, who liquidated his debts. In his will (1762) Wolf declared that, although entailing a great loss upon him, he accepted this liquidation in order to do justice to his creditors. Further, he enjoined his children to pay in full his father's donation of 22,000 florins, although in 1759 he (Wolf) had returned to the Frankfurt congregation 10,000 florins which it had contributed to this fund.

In 1769 the grandchildren of Samson Wertheimer secured the donation of 150,000 florins, and Wolf's heirs added thereto 40,000 florins, in compensation for unpaid interest. These two foundations at Vienna and Jerusalem still keep alive the name of Wertheimer.

Samson's second son, Löb, married a daughter of Issachar ha-Levi Bermann of Halberstadt, a relative of Leffman Behrens, court Jew of Hanover; thus the three great "shetadlanin" were closely connected. Samson's sons-in-law were: R. Moses Kann of Frankfurt-on-the-Main; Issachar Berush Eskeles, father of the Vienna banker Bernhard von Eskeles; Joseph, son of R. David Oppenheimer; and Seligmann Berend Kohn, called Solomon of Hamburg. His youngest son, Joseph Josel (b. 1718), married a daughter of his stepbrother Wolf. Joseph died in Vienna (1761), where he was reportedly greatly esteemed for his charity and Talmudic learning.

== See also ==
- Austrian Jewish Museum
