= Landesrabbiner =

Spiritual heads of Jewish communities, particularly in Germany and Austria

Landesrabbiner (Note: Variant terms: Landrabbiner, Oberlandesrabbiner.) (German: [ˈlandəs.ʁaˌbiːnɐ]; Hebrew: רב המדינה, romanized: Rav HaMedina) are spiritual heads of the Jewish communities of a country, province, or district, particularly in Germany and Austria. The office is a result of the legal condition of the Jews in medieval times when the Jewish communities formed a unit for the purposes of taxation. As the community had to pay certain taxes to the government, the latter had to appoint someone who should be responsible to it for their prompt collection, and who consequently had to be invested with a certain authority. The office of Landesrabbiner had no ecclesiastical meaning until the 18th century, when the various governments began to consider it their duty to care for the spiritual welfare of the Jews. Such ecclesiastical authority, owing to the strictly congregational constitution of the communities, never took root among the Jews (see, however, on the chief rabbinate of Moravia after the death of Marcus Benedict, Moses Sofer, Responsa, Oraḥ Ḥayyim, 13).

== Earliest data ==
The transfer of the Jews from the status of imperial to that of territorial subjects, provided by the charter of Frederick II of Austria (1244) and recognized by Emperor Charles IV in his golden bull (1356), as well as their very frequent expulsion from the large cities in the 15th and 16th centuries, scattered the Jews in small communities. These were without protection against the arbitrary action of petty tyrants; and they caused the rulers considerable inconvenience owing to constant litigation concerning encroachments on the rights of Jews living under their protection. Therefore, the Jews of a given territory organized themselves into an association which elected an advocate ("Shtadlan") for the protection of their interests. Such an official was recognized by the government as the legal representative of the Jews, whose duty was to see that the taxes imposed on the Jews as a body were promptly paid, that the laws against usury were obeyed, and who in turn was given jurisdiction in civil cases. This jurisdiction, which he exercised either personally if a scholar or through his deputy if not one, gave the Landesrabbiner an authority within the community. Inasmuch as the Jews from the sixteenth century lived almost exclusively in small communities and could not maintain a rabbi or a rabbinical court (which consisted of three members in every settlement), several communities in a district combined to do so. To this condition of things may be attributed the real creation of the office of Landesrabbiner, the former attempts to appoint a chief rabbi over all the Jews of a country—e.g., in Germany by Emperor Rupert in 1407, and in Spain, France, and Portugal, partly in the 14th, partly in the 15th, century—having been mostly abortive, and at all events merely fiscal measures designed for the purpose of tax-collecting (see Heinrich Grätz, "Gesch." viii. 8, 102, et passim; Scherer, "Rechtsverhältnisse der Juden", p. 258; Bishop of the Jews; Hochmeister). The first Landesrabbiner of whom there is authentic record is Judah Löw ben Bezaleel, of whom his contemporary David Gans says that he was for 20 years (1553–73) the spiritual head ("ab bet din") of all the Jewish congregations in the province of Moravia ("Ẓemaḥ Dawid", year 5352).

== From the 17th century ==
At the time of Löw ben Bezaleel the congregations of Moravia were evidently very small. They were composed of refugees who through the influence of Capistrano, had been expelled from the large cities like Brno and Olomouc (1454) and had settled where any well-disposed lord would receive them under his protection. As they formed communities too small to engage a well-qualified rabbi, they elected to act as their judge one having his seat in one of the largest congregations of the province. Similar conditions prevailed elsewhere. The Jews living in the principality of Bamberg obtained in 1619 permission to elect a "Paumeister oder obristen Rabbi", and they may have had such an official earlier (Eckstein, "Gesch. der Juden im Ehemaligen Fürstbistum Bamberg", pp. 62, 157, Bamberg, 1898). The communities of the Principality of Oettingen, also formed from refugees of larger cities like Nördlingen, had a Landesrabbiner from early times (Müller, "Aus Fünf Jahrhunderten", p. 171, Augsburg, 1900). The Jews living under the protection of the Elector and the Archbishop of Mayence had in 1718 Issachar Berush Eskeles as their Landesrabbiner (Bamberger, "Historische Berichte über die Juden . . . Aschaffenburg", p. 18, Strasbourg, 1900). The title was occasionally conferred as a sign of distinction; thus Samson Wertheimer received in 1717 from Emperor Charles VI. the title of Landesrabbiner of Hungary ("pro archi sive superiori Judæorum Rabbino"). His son-in-law, the above-named Eskeles, who (although he resided in Vienna, being connected with his father-in-law's banking business there) had succeeded his father, Gabriel Eskeles, as Landesrabbiner of Moravia, was appointed (1725) at Wertheimer's death his successor as Landesrabbiner of Hungary (Kaufmann, "Samson Wertheimer", p. 104, Vienna, 1888; Wurzbach, "Biographisches Lexikon", s.v. "Eskeles").

== As Spiritual Chiefs ==
In the course of the 18th century, various governments attempted to influence the internal condition of the Jewish communities, and for this reason legislated with regard to their congregational constitutions. Typical in this respect is Maria Theresa, who in her "General-Polizei-Prozess und Kommercialordnung für die Judenschaft" of Moravia (December 29, 1753) prescribes in detail the duties of the Landesrabbiner; e.g., that he shall assign the tractate which all other rabbis shall adopt for instruction; bestow the title of "Doppelter Reb" ("Morenu"); see that all taxes are promptly paid; and arrange the complicated election of a new official. Other provinces were to have a Landesrabbiner. Indeed, the empress appointed one for Galicia, but he had no successor. In Germany it was chiefly in the small states, where the governments directed all affairs, that the institution was established. Hesse-Cassel had a "Landesrabbinat", which was a board constituted on the same basis as the Protestant consistory, but with a Landesrabbiner as presiding officer. Its establishment was decreed in 1823. Hanover made similar provisions in the law of 1844 on Jewish affairs. Up to 1938 it has had 4 Landrabbiners, at Hanover (Land Rabbinate of Hanover, est. 1687), Hildesheim (est. 1842), Stade (Land Rabbinate of Stade, est. 1842; since 1860 served per pro by the land rabbis of Hanover and Emden alternately) and Emden (est. 1827). Specially typical conditions existed in the Grand Duchy of Mecklenburg-Schwerin, where the government established the institution of Landesrabbiner May 14, 1839, continuing the 1764-established chief rabbinate for the Duchy of Mecklenburg-Schwerin. Here the rabbis (Samuel Holdheim and David Einhorn) were at first supposed to introduce radical reforms, but after the revolution of 1848, when the policy of the government became reactionary, the 1853-newly elected rabbi Baruch Isaak Lipschütz was intended to strengthen "historic Judaism". In Saxe-Weimar the government used the Landesrabbiner to enforce the law of June 20, 1823, which ordered that services be held in German (see Hess, Mendel). In Saxe-Meiningen the Landesrabbinat was organized by the law of Jan. 5, 1811. Here as elsewhere in the small German states the object of the institution was to raise the moral and intellectual status of the Jews.

== In the 19th century ==
By the 19th century, only some of the small states of Germany still had a Landesrabbiner, namely, Mecklenburg-Schwerin, Mecklenburg-Strelitz, Oldenburg, Birkenfeld, Saxe-Meiningen, Anhalt, Brunswick, and Schwarzburg-Sondershausen. Prussia, which always proclaimed the principle of non-interference in internal Jewish affairs, retained the office in some of the provinces annexed in 1866, as the 4 Landrabbinate in the Province of Hanover and in the province of Hesse-Nassau (Cassel). The office of Landesrabbiner for the province of Brandenburg, which existed in Berlin and in Frankfort-on-the-Oder, survived, as in other countries, up to the end of the 18th century by virtue of the rabbi's capacity as civil judge. The last one to hold the title was Hirschel Lewin, while his successor, Simon Mayer Weyl (d. 1828), held the title of "Vice[-]ober[-]landesrabbiner". As an exceptional favor the government in 1849 gave to Gedaliah Tiktin of Breslau the title of Landesrabbiner, which was interpreted as a manifestation of the government in favor of Orthodoxy and as a disapproval of the Reform movement (L. Geiger, "Abraham Geiger's Leben in Briefen", pp. 113 et seq., Berlin, 1878).

In Austria Samson Hirsch held the office for the province of Moravia from 1847 to 1851. He was elected according to the complicated method prescribed in the law issued by Maria Theresa. At the time of his resignation the legal position of the Jewish communities was in a state of chaos owing to the events of 1848, which had played havoc with the principles on which the legislation rested. The government then appointed as substitute Abraham Placzek of Boskowitz, who in his last years had his son Baruch Placzek of Brünn appointed as his assistant. An attempt made by Baron Moritz Königswarter, who was a member of the House of Lords, to introduce into the law of 1890 regulating the legal status of the Austrian Jewish congregations a clause reestablishing the office of Landesrabbiner of Moravia was defeated in the lower house of the Reichsrath (Löw, "Das Mährische Landesrabbinat", in "Gesammelte Schriften", ii. 215–218, Szegedin, 1890; D'Elvert, "Zur Gesch. der Juden in Mähren und Oesterreich. Schlesien", pp. 209–211, Brünn, 1895; Willibald Müller, "Beiträge zur Geschichte der Mährischen Judenschaft", pp. 157–165, Olomouc, 1903). Baruch Placzek is, however, officially addressed by the government authorities as "Landesrabbiner"; he recently appointed Solomon Funk, rabbi of Boskowitz, as his substitute, an appointment which the government confirmed ("Oesterr. Wochenschrift", 1904, p. 190). The office existed also in Siebenbürgen early in the 19th century.

A similar institution is that of Chief Rabbi of the United Hebrew Congregations of the British Empire, which, however, rests exclusively on voluntary acknowledgement on the part of the congregations, and does not extend over whole groups of congregations like the Portuguese, the Reform, and the Polish organizations. The office of the Grand Rabbin du Consistoire Central in France is also of similar nature, but differs in that the chief rabbi acts merely in his capacity as member of the consistory, and not as hierarchic chief.

== See also ==
- Chief Rabbi
- Court Jew
- Crown rabbi
- Hakham Bashi
- Landsmanshaft
- Schutzjude
