= Servi camerae regis =

Servi camerae regis (Latin: "servants of the royal chamber", German: Kammerknechtschaft) was the status of the Jews in Christian Europe in the Middle Ages. The ruler had the right to tax them for the benefit of his treasury (camera regis), but at the same time he had a duty to protect them when they were in danger from others. The Laws of Edward the Confessor enacted in England in the 12th century defined the status of the Jews as follows:

All Jews, wherever in the realm they are, must be under the king's liege protection and guardianship, nor can any of them put himself under the protection of any powerful person without the king's license, because the Jews themselves and all their chattels are the king's. If, therefore, anyone detain them or their money, the king may claim them, if he so desire and if he is able, as his own.

This status is found in several areas of Christian Europe during the Middle Ages. For example, in 1236 Frederick II, Holy Roman Emperor announced in Regensberg and Worms that all Jews in Germany belonged to the emperor's fiscus. Frederick also determined the extent of Jewish civil rights and their ability to work for Christians or hire Christians.

== See also ==
- Court Jew
- Schutzjude
- Leibzoll
