= Issachar Berend Lehmann =

German-Jewish banker, merchant, diplomat and court Jew

- Born: 23 June 1661; Essen
- Died: 9 July 1730 (aged 69); Halberstadt
- Occupation: Banker, court Jew, diplomat, merchant, jeweler

Issachar Berend Lehmann, Berend Lehmann, Yissakhar Bermann Segal, Yissakhar ben Yehuda haLevi, or Berman Halberstadt (April 23, 1661 in Essen, Westphalia – July 9, 1730 in Halberstadt, Kingdom of Prussia), was a German banker, merchant, diplomatic agent as well as army and mint contractor working as a court Jew for Elector Augustus II the Strong of Saxony, King of Poland, and other German princes. He was privileged as a court Jew and resident. Thanks to his wealth, privileges as well as social and cultural commitment, he was a Jewish dignitary famous in his day in Central and Eastern Europe.

== Life ==
=== Ancestry and training ===
Lehmann's father belonged to the Jewish upper class of Westphalia, just like his brother-in-law, the court Jew Leffmann Behrens of Bochum, later established in Hannover. From him, older biographers assume, Berend Lehmann received some business training and then traded in Behrens’ commission. In 1692 he is active together with Leffmann Behrens at the imperial court in Vienna in business transactions to promote Duke Ernst August of Hannover's Duchy of Hannover to an electorate.

=== Young family and own business in Halberstadt ===
His activity is first documented, as, at age 26, he did business at the Leipzig Trade Fair of 1687, where subsequently he was a regular visitor at the then three annual seasons. He resided in Halberstadt, where, from 1688, he is listed as married to Miriam, daughter of the deceased protected Jew, Joel Alexander. From him he derived his protected status. Two years later his first son, Lehmann Behrend, was born and he built his first, modest abode in the Jewish quarter of Halberstadt (Bakenstraße 37, partly existent in the building complex of Little Venice).

=== Banker to Saxon elector ===
In 1694 he became a mint and general business agent to his own sovereign, the Elector of Brandenburg; a year later he was in a banking connection with the Saxon electoral court at Dresden. In 1697 he was commissioned by the young Elector, Augustus the Strong, to procure money needed for the acquisition of the Polish throne. He received authority to sell or pawn lands situated outside the main territory of Saxony and collected loans worth millions of guilders from Christian and Jewish banking partners, with the help of which the Saxon field marshal Heino Heinrich Graf von Flemming persuaded the majority of the Polish nobility into electing Augustus the Strong King "in" Poland. In recognition of such services, Augustus made Berend Lehmann "Resident of the King of Poland in the Lower Saxon Circle". This was some sort of a consul's privilege on which Lehmann repeatedly based his demands, more or less successfully.

=== Building activities in Halberstadt ===
So, from Elector Frederic William III of Brandenburg he received the right to buy for himself in Halberstadt, in addition to the modest house he already possessed, a sizable building he thought fitting of his rank. This was an exception, as having a second house was normally forbidden to Jews. When in the extensive garden grounds he had a new building erected for a yeshiva (a Torah-/Talmud academy) as the nucleus of a community campus which was also to accommodate a large new synagogue, he was forbidden to carry on. Before he was able to buy two adjacent houses in addition, the property was confiscated for the newly received French Reformed refugees. The protest of his protector, Augustus the Strong, against the confiscation proved in vain.

=== Talmud printed ===
In the meantime he had achieved a considerable religious feat: When the Dessau court Jew Wulff, who was about to have the Babylonian Talmud printed, ran into financial difficulty, Lehmann took over the project and the printing licence. He "had gold flow from his pocket", so that within two years, from 1697 to 1699, 2,000 copies of a twelve volume edition could be produced in Frankfurt (Oder). A large part of the work went - free of charge - to poor Jewish communities.

=== Army contractor ===
Between 1700 und 1704 Berend Lehmann supplied military equipment for Augustus the Strong in the Northern War against Sweden. Letters from him to an influential courtier at Dresden show him busy acquiring new loans, and anxious over their repayment.

=== Community benefactor in Halberstadt ===
In 1707 his wife, Miriam, died and soon after he remarried, namely Hannle, daughter of a Frankfurt (Main) community superior by the name of Mendel Beer. At this time he built a whole complex of buildings as an extension of his first modest home in Halberstadt. In his building ambitions he was permanently hindered by the Prussian local administration, but promoted by the Berlin Hofcammer, an institution geared to the levying of money for the King. On the new premises, apart from offices and private space for a growing family and team of servants, he kept a warehouse and a wine cellar, and "for mercy, so they can perform their divine service", sheltered six poor Jewish families. As one of the three parnassim (superiors) of the Halberstadt community of around 1,000 Jews (more than in Berlin), he had the task of "repartitioning" the extra contributions which King Frederick William I of Prussia (the Soldiers’ King) repeatedly drew from the Jews. He himself shouldered the lion's share.

=== Dresden branch ===
Back in Dresden, he also worked as a mint agent for the Saxon-and-Polish state. Likewise he procured jewels for Augustus the Strong's show collection Grünes Gewölbe. In 1708, such activities led to the foundation of a Dresden branch of his Halberstadt business, in which his then 18-year-old eldest son, Lehmann Behrend, worked alongside himself and his brother-in-law, Jonas Meyer. Strictly speaking, outside the Leipzig trade fairs the Lehmanns and Meyer were the only protected Jews in all of Saxony. But the large enterprise (proudly residing in the Altes Posthaus at Landhausstraße 13) employed and housed up to 70 Jewish employees who were themselves not protected . This above all provoked the anti-Jewish protest of the Saxon estates (among whom the clergy and traders were particularly active), which Augustus the Strong fended off for a longtime but eventually gave in to. In the mid-1720s the sale of merchandise had to stop, while the banking branch continued in a smaller fashion.

=== Agricultural and Hebrew printing activities in Blankenburg ===
From Halberstadt he had a business connection with the sovereign of the nearby petty principality of Blankenburg (Harz). In 1717, Prince Louis Rudolph, Duke of Brunswick-Wolfenbüttel allowed him to buy landed property there, a privilege otherwise denied to Jews. Lehmann resided in a stately mansion and founded a Hebrew printing office, which was conducted by the printer Israel Abraham from Jeßnitz, but failed for Christian censorship reasons.

=== Foreign affairs adventure ===
In 1721 Lehmann went in for a precarious attempt at causing the sovereigns of Prussia and Saxony-Poland to undertake the partition of Poland. Lehmann had outstanding debts there and hoped to be able to cash them in from the future Prussian part of the country. The Habsburg Emperor Charles VI and Czar Peter the Great were also to profit from the partition. Lehmann sought to address the Emperor through the latter's son-in-law, the Blankenburg prince, Louis Rudolph. The Czar, let in on the plan by Prussia, reacted angrily and demanded strict inquiry and punishment of the Jew. Lehmann was spared the worst by Augustus the Strong; he was only granted back the grace of his patron after sacrificing a precious stone to him.

=== Financial decline and death ===
At the same time, he lost a great amount of capital, which was confiscated when his son-in-law, the Hanover court Jew Isaac Behrends, went bankrupt and Lehmann was accused of having illegally held back securities, jewels and money from the estate for him (the allegation was never verified). The Hannover Justizkanzlei (chancellery of justice) wanted him on trial in Hannover, but the Prussian king, Frederick William I, refused the extradition of his Protected Jew, and a heavy dispute continued for years whether Hannover or Lehmann's Prussian domicile of Halberstadt was the legal venue. Meanwhile, Lehmann tried to bring about a settlement with the Behrens' creditors by partly renouncing his own claims and encouraging the other Jewish creditors to do likewise. He also protested in several letters to King George I, who was also the Hannoverian sovereign, against his relatives' five years' imprisonment and ultimate torture (which did not yield the expected confession of the alleged embezzlemement). There were further losses, so that in 1727 Berend Lehmann's own insolvency was declared. The causes of his failure have not yet been researched. Neither is it clear how he, all the same, succeeded in setting up several foundations. One of them was to hold money to facilitate the marriages of poor orphan boys and girls in the Halberstadt community, another was to secure the livelihood of his yeshiva scholars. It served its purpose for the following two centuries. Early in 1730, the margrave of Bayreuth confronted him with a debt claim of 6,000 talers dating back to 1699. It took him some time to borrow the sum in order to have the "execution" of house arrest lifted. After his death on July 9, 1730, claims of several hundred thousand talers could only partly be satisfied through the auction of most of his real estate. Subsequently, his eldest son, Lehmann Behrend of Dresden, also failed. Lehmann's gravestone, in the oldest Halberstadt Israelitic cemetery, is preserved, and it praises his generosity as a community benefactor and his high reputation in the Christian "palaces" which enabled him to act as a shtadlan (an advocate) of his correligionists.

== Importance ==
Berend Lehmann ranks among the great court Jews - the Wertheimers and Oppenheimers of Vienna, Joseph Süss Oppenheimer of Stuttgart, Leffmann Behrends of Hannover, the Rothschilds of Frankfurt on the Main - as one of the most highly respected Jewish personalities in Central and Eastern Europe. His ambition to make an impact on the life of his times made him a baroque figure not unlike his noble Christian contemporaries and it put him in frequent conflict with the Christian authorities trying to curb his efforts. In his charitable and religious generosity he is the model of a wealthy Jew also being a pious leader of his community.

== Reception ==
=== Saint and hero ===
Berend Lehmann's later image was first determined by eulogies and legends in the Hebrew and Yiddish chronicles of the community. 150 years later, in the Geschichte der israelitischen Gemeinde Halberstadt (History of the Israelitic Community of Halberstadt, 1866) the then rabbi of the city, Auerbach, passed the old stories on with some scepticism but still with great veneration. He was followed in this mood by another orthodox rabbi, Marcus Lehmann of Mainz, who in his Jüd. Volksbibliothek (Jewish People's Library) painted Berend Lehmann's life in episodes (largely invented) as a patriarch and active participant in German and Jewish political life. He stressed Lehmann's support of the Polish Jews in their misery. This 19th-century picture of the Royal Resident as a saint and hero has recently been characterized as "not necessarily having to do with reality but being an identification offer [...] invented at the writing desks of Auerbach and Marcus Lehmann".

=== More realism ===
Twenty years after the two rabbis, Emil Lehmann, a great-great-great-grandson of Berend Lehmann's and a Dresden liberal lawyer and politician, wrote an essay about him, which for the first time used archival evidence. He pointed out the adroitness of his ancestor in the tactics of his fighting, also admiring the foresight with which the Resident had seen to the long-time functioning of his foundations. Though more realistic as a biographer than his predecessors, Emil Lehmann still had the bias of an admiring descendant. At the turn of the 20th century the Dessau rabbi, Max Freudenthal, researched into Lehmann's merits with respect to Hebrew printing. He cleared up the business circumstances of the Talmud edition of 1697 to 1699, especially Lehmann's stressful relationship with the Christian printer, Michael Gottschalk. For the first time he showed Lehmann's tough business acumen. He also described Lehmann's connection with the printer Israel Abraham of Köthen and Jeßnitz with whom he published several of the works of his Halberstadt yeshiva scholars.

=== An unbiased approach ===
A further step in the direction of a historically unbiased evaluation of Berend Lehmann was taken by the Berlin archivist Josef Meisl, the later founder of the Central Archives for the History of the Jewish People. In 1924 he edited Lehmann's correspondence from the Baltic battlefields of the Northern War. They show Lehmann's extensive activities as an army contractor and his aspiration to participate in political processes (which Meisl, however, regarded as amateurish).

=== Selma Stern ===
A great push came into Lehmann's biography through the historian Selma Stern, who between 1925 and 1962 first dealt with the conditions of Jews in 17th- and 18th-century Prussia and then with court Jews in particular In her collection of documents his activities for the Halberstadt Jews and the Jewish community in general became more concrete. In her court Jew book she ranked him with the Wertheimers and Oppenheimers of Vienna and even with the Rothschilds of Frankfurt. She contrasted him as the "genuine" court Jew with the less well-reputed Joseph Süß Oppenheimer of Stuttgart, and thus idealised him.

=== Antisemitic setback ===
The antisemitism of the National Socialists yielded two contributions about Berend Lehmann, the first, by Peter Deeg (1938), being a caricature of him as the stereotyped "usurer", the second one, by Heinrich Schnee (1953), a one-sided portrait of him as a profiteer and a clever augmenter of Jewish influence.

=== New eulogies ===
In 1970, as a sort of response to these distortions, the French private scholar Pierre Saville published the first monography on the Résident Royal. With little new evidence, he strengthened the "identification offer" rôle of Berend Lehmann by painting another heroic picture of him. The American orthodox rabbi, Manfred R. Lehman, did the same in several contributions about his "possible ancestor".

=== New Research ===
Studies from the sources regarding Berend Lehmann were resumed in the first decade of the 21st century by Lucia Raspe and Berndt Strobach.

== Traces and memory in Halberstadt ==
=== A building complex ===
In Halberstadt the building complex at Bakenstraße Nr. 37, which survived the air raid on the city in 1945 and the subsequent neglect of historic architecture in East Germany, is an impressive document of Lehmann's building activity. In one of its outer walls the remnants of a pedestrian bridge across the river Holtemme (which in its day flowed openly among the houses of the Jewish quarter) testify to his public spirit. He had it built for "the benefit of the general public".

=== Museum and Academy ===
The Berend Lehmann Museum, founded in 2001 by the Halberstadt-based Moses Mendelssohn Akademie in two picturesque half-timbered houses (one containing a former mikveh situated in the grounds of the synagogue destroyed in 1938, document the life of the court Jew and the heritage of colourful later Jewish life in the city. There remains a doorway of a richly decorated baroque building near the museum dating from about 1730 which was taken down in 1986 (although it might have been saved), and is locally taken to have been Berend Lehmann's Palace, although there is no evidence that it was connected with him.

=== Former Teaching House ===
The Klaus (or yeshiva), Rosenwinkel 18, was founded by Lehmann in a house near the synagogue and moved to its present location in the late 18th century. In the 19th century, as a rabbinical academy it became one of the strongholds of neo-orthodox Judaism. It survived Kristallnacht and the 1945 air raid and is now the seat of the Moses Mendelssohn Akademie. The academy offers information on Jewish life in the form of conferences, exhibitions and lectures. Its lecture hall is the former synagogue of the yeshiva.

=== New religious community attempted ===
There has been no Jewish religious community in the city since the post-war years when, for a short time, survivors from the concentration camps gathered there. There is an initiative to establish a new community for a number of Jews from the CIS countries who have settled in Halberstadt .
