= Hakham Bashi =

Turkish term used to refer to the chief rabbi of the Ottoman Empire

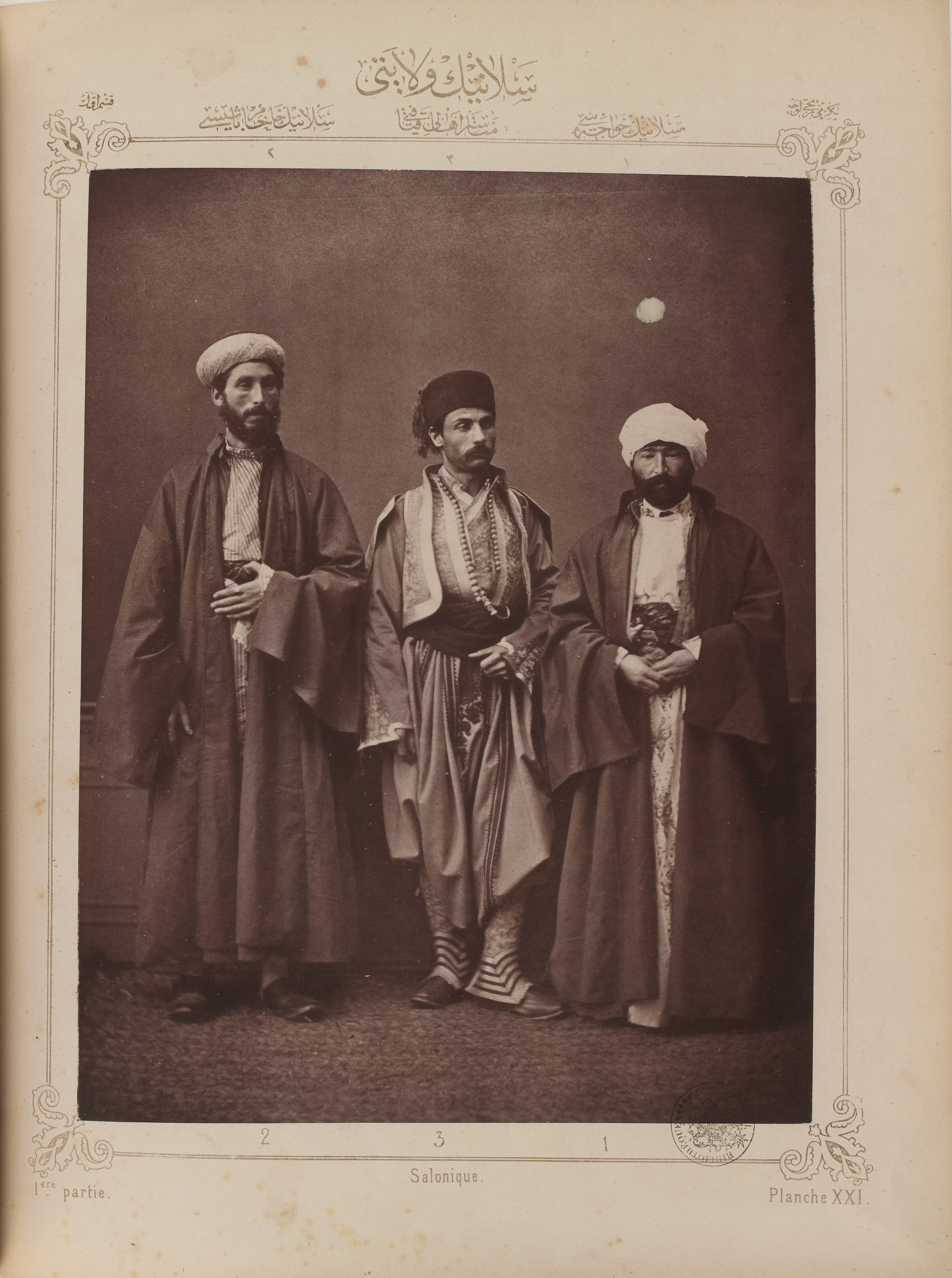
Hakham Bashi of Salonika (now Thessaloniki) to the left of a Monastir town dweller and a Salonika hodja (Islamic teacher), from Les costumes populaires de la Turquie en 1873, published under the patronage of the Ottoman Imperial Commission for the 1873 Vienna World's Fair

Hakham Bashi (Note: Hebrew: חכם באשי. In languages of other ethnic minorities: Arabic: ruʾasāʾ al-khākhāmāt; Armenian: The term xaxamglxut‘iwn is used in documents even though Armenian had a word for rabbi, "rabbuni". xaxam is from the Turkish, for rabbi, and "glux" means "head".; Bulgarian: Xaxamabaši; Greek: χαχαμπάσης (chachampasēs) which is explained as "μεγάλος ραβίνος" or "Grand Rabbi".; Persian: khākhāmbāšīgarī is used in the Persian version of the Ottoman Constitution of 1876. Strauss stated that there was a possibility that Persian took the word from Ottoman Turkish as he did not see it in earlier dictionaries.) (Ottoman Turkish: حاخامباشی, Turkish: Hahambaşı, IPA: [haˈham baˈʃɯ]; Ladino: xaxam (חכם) baši; translated into French as: khakham-bachi) is the Turkish name for the Chief Rabbi of the nation's Jewish community. In the time of the Ottoman Empire it was also used for the chief rabbi of a particular region of the empire, such as Syria, the Land of Israel or Iraq, though the Hakham Bashi of Constantinople was considered overall head of the Jews of the Empire.

In 1840, a position of Hakham Bashi was established in Jerusalem.

== Etymology ==
Hakham is Hebrew for "wise man" (or "scholar"), while başı is Turkish for "head".

The Karaites used the word "Hakham" for a rabbi, a practice shared by, Sephardic Jews, Mizrahi Jews, and some other non-Ashkenazi minhagim; accordingly, the Ottoman Turks adopted this usage for this name.

== History ==
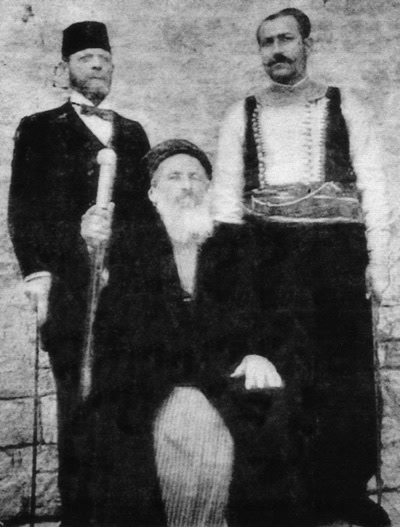
Chief Rabbi Jacob Saul Dwek, Hakham Bashi of Aleppo, Ottoman Syria, 1908

The institution of the Hakham Bashi was established by the Ottoman sultan Mehmed II (r. 1444–1446, 1451–1481) with the appointment of Moses Capsali. However, it is not clear whether the chief rabbi's authority extended over all the Jews of the empire or only those living in Constantinople. This was a part of Mehmed's policy of governing his exceedingly diverse subjects according to their own laws and authorities wherever possible. Religion was considered as primordial aspect of a communities 'national' identity, so the term Ethnarch has been applied to such religious leaders, especially the (Greek Orthodox) Ecumenical Patriarch of Constantinople (i.e. in the Sultan's imperial capital, renamed Istanbul in 1930 but replaced by Ankara as republican capital in 1923). As Islam was the official religion of both court and state, the Chief Mufti in Istanbul had a much higher status, even of cabinet rank.

Because of the size and nature of the Ottoman state, containing a far greater part of the diaspora than any other, the position of Hakham Bashi has been compared to that of the Jewish Exilarch.

In the Ottoman Empire, and as such, the Hakham Bashi was the closest thing to an overall Exilarchal authority among Jewry everywhere in the Middle East in early modern times. They held broad powers to legislate, judge and enforce the laws among the Jews in the Ottoman Empire and often sat on the Sultan's divan.

The office also maintained considerable influence outside the Ottoman Empire, especially after the forced migration of numerous Jewish communities and individuals out of Spain (after the fall of Granada in 1492) and Italy.

The Chief Rabbi of the modern, secular Republic of Turkey is still known as Hahambaşı.

The term Hakham Bashi was also used for the official Government-appointed Chief Rabbi of other important cities in the Ottoman Empire, such as Damascus and Baghdad.

The position of Hakham Bashi of Palestine terminated with the appointment of separate Ashkenazi and Sephardi Chief Rabbis in 1921.

== List of incumbents ==
=== Chief Rabbis of the Ottoman Empire (Hahambaşı) ===
Moses Capsali	1454–1495
Elijah Mizrachi	1497–1526
Mordechai Komitano	1526–1542
Tam ibn Yahya	1542–1543
Eliyyah Benjamin ha-Levi	1543
Eliyyah ben Ḥayyim	1543–1602
Yeḥiel Bassan	1602–1625
Joseph Miṭrani	1625–1639
Yomṭov Ben Yaʿesh	1639–1642
Yomṭov ben Ḥananiah Ben Yaqar	1642–1677
Ḥayyim Qamḥi	1677–1715
Judah Ben Rey	1715–1717
Samuel Levi	1717–1720
Abraham ben Ḥayyim Rosanes	1720–1745
Solomon Ḥayyim Alfandari	1745–1762
Meir Ishaki	1762–1780
Elijah Palombo	1780–1800
Ḥayyim Jacob Benyakar	1800–1835
Abraham ha-Levi	1835–1836
Samuel ben Moses Ḥayyim	1836–1837
Moses Fresco	1839–1841
Jacob Behar David	1841–1854
Ḥayyim ha-Kohen	1854–1860
Jacob (or Yakup) Avigdor	1860–1863
Yakir Geron	1863–1872
Moses Levi	1872–1908
Haim Nahum Effendi	1908–1920
Shabbetai Levi	1918–1919
Ishak Ariel	1919–1920

=== Chief Rabbis of the Turkish Republic (Hahambaşı) ===
Haim Bejarano	1920–1931
Haim Ishak Saki	1931–1940
Rafael David Saban	1940–1960
David Asseo	1961–2002
Ishak Haleva	2002–2025
David Sevi	2025-

=== Chief Rabbis of Ottoman Galilee ===
Makhlouf Eldaoudi	1889–1909

=== Chief Rabbis of Ottoman Palestine ===
Chaim Abraham Gagin	1842–1848
Isaac Kovo	1848–1854
Chaim Nissim Abulafia	1854–1861
Chaim David Hazan	1861–1869
Abraham Ashkenazi	1869–1880
Raphael Meir Panigel	1880–1892
Jacob Saul Elyashar	1893–1906
Elijah Moses Panigel	1907-1908
Nahman Batito	1909-1911
Moshe Yehuda Franco	1911
Nissim Yehuda Danon	1916-1918

=== Sephardi Chief Rabbis of British Mandatory Palestine ===
Jacob Meir	1921–1939
Ben-Zion Meir Hai Uziel	1939–1948

=== Sephardi Chief Rabbis of Israel ===
Ben-Zion Meir Hai Uziel	1948–1953
Yitzhak Nissim	1955–1972
Ovadia Yosef	1972–1982
Mordechai Eliyahu	1982–1993
Eliyahu Bakshi-Doron	1993–2003
Shlomo Amar	2003–2013
Yitzhak Yosef	2013–2024
David Yosef	2024–

== See also ==
- History of the Jews in Turkey
- Ottoman Jews
- Court Jew
- Crown rabbi
- Landesrabbiner
- Schutzjude
- Shtadlan
