= Court Jew =

Jewish banker to European royalty

Court Jew (Note: German: Hofjude, Yiddish: הויף איד, romanized: hoyf id) or court factor (German: Hoffaktor, Yiddish: קאַורט פאַקטאַר, romanized: kourt faktor) (also court factor, court agent, or chamber agent) was a term used in early modern period Europe, particularly in Germany for Jewish moneylenders who lent to or managed money for the upper classes in return for social privileges.

The class first emerged in the High Middle Ages, (Note: around AD 1000–1250) notable examples being Aaron of Lincoln and Vivelin of Strasbourg. The rise of the absolute monarchies in Central Europe brought many Jews, mostly of Ashkenazi origin, into the position of negotiating loans for the various courts. They could amass personal fortunes and gain political and social influence. However, the court Jew had social connections and influence in the Christian world mainly through the Christian nobility and church.

Due to the precarious position of Jews, some nobles could ignore their debts. If the sponsoring noble died, his Jewish financier could face exile or execution. The most famous example of this occurred in Württemberg in 1737–1738, when, after the death of his sponsor Charles Alexander, Joseph Süß Oppenheimer was put on trial and executed. In an effort to avoid such fate, some court bankers in the late 18th century — including Samuel Bleichröder, Mayer Amschel Rothschild, and Aron Elias Seligmann — successfully detached their businesses from these courts and established what eventually developed into full-fledged banks.

== Background ==
Prohibited from many other trades, some Jews began to occupy an economic niche as moneylenders in the Middle Ages. While the Catholic Church condemned usury universally at the time, canon law applied only to Christians, meaning that Jews were allowed to lend money at interest.

Eventually, a sizable sector of the Jewish community were engaged in financial occupations, and the community was a financially highly successful part of the medieval economy. The religious restrictions on moneylending had inadvertently created a source of monopoly rents, causing profits associated with moneylending to be higher than they otherwise would have been.

By most parameters, the standard of living of the Jewish community in early medieval period was at least equal to that of the lower nobility. However, despite this economic prosperity, the community was not safe: religious hostility manifested itself in the form of massacres and expulsions, culminating in repeated expulsions of all Jews from various parts of Western Europe in the late medieval period.

Although the phenomenon of "Court Jewry" did not occur until the early 17th century, there are some earlier examples of Jewish moneylenders who accumulated enough capital to finance the nobility. Among them was Josce of Gloucester, who financed Richard de Clare, 2nd Earl of Pembroke's conquest of Ireland in 1170; and Aaron of Lincoln, "probably the wealthiest person in England," who left an estate of about £100,000. Also notable was Vivelin of Strasbourg, who in 1339 — just prior to the Hundred Years' War — lent 340,000 florins to Edward III of England.

By the 16th century, Jewish financiers had become increasingly connected to rulers and courts. Josef Goldschmidt of Frankfurt (d. 1572), also known as "Jud Joseph zum Goldenen Schwan", became the most important Jewish businessman of his era, trading not only with the Fuggers and Imhoffs, but also with the nobility and the Church.

In the early 17th century the Habsburgs employed the services of Jacob Bassevi of Prague, Joseph Pincherle of Gorizia, and Moses and Jacob Marburger of Gradisca.

At the dawn of mercantilism, while most Sephardi Jews were primarily active in the west in maritime and colonial trade, the Ashkenazi Jews in the service of the emperor and princes tended toward domestic trade. They were mostly wealthy businessmen, distinguished above their co-religionists by their commercial instincts and their adaptability. Court Jews frequently came into conflict with court rivals and co-religionists.

The court Jews, as the agents of the rulers, and in times of war as the purveyors and the treasurers of the state, enjoyed special privileges. They were under the jurisdiction of the court marshal, and were not compelled to wear the Jews' badge. They were permitted to stay wherever the Emperor held his court, and to live anywhere in the Holy Roman Empire, even in places where no other Jews were allowed.

Wherever they settled they could buy houses, slaughter meat according to the Jewish ritual, and maintain a rabbi. They could sell their goods wholesale and retail, and could not be taxed or assessed higher than the Christians. Jews were sometimes assigned the role of local tax collectors.

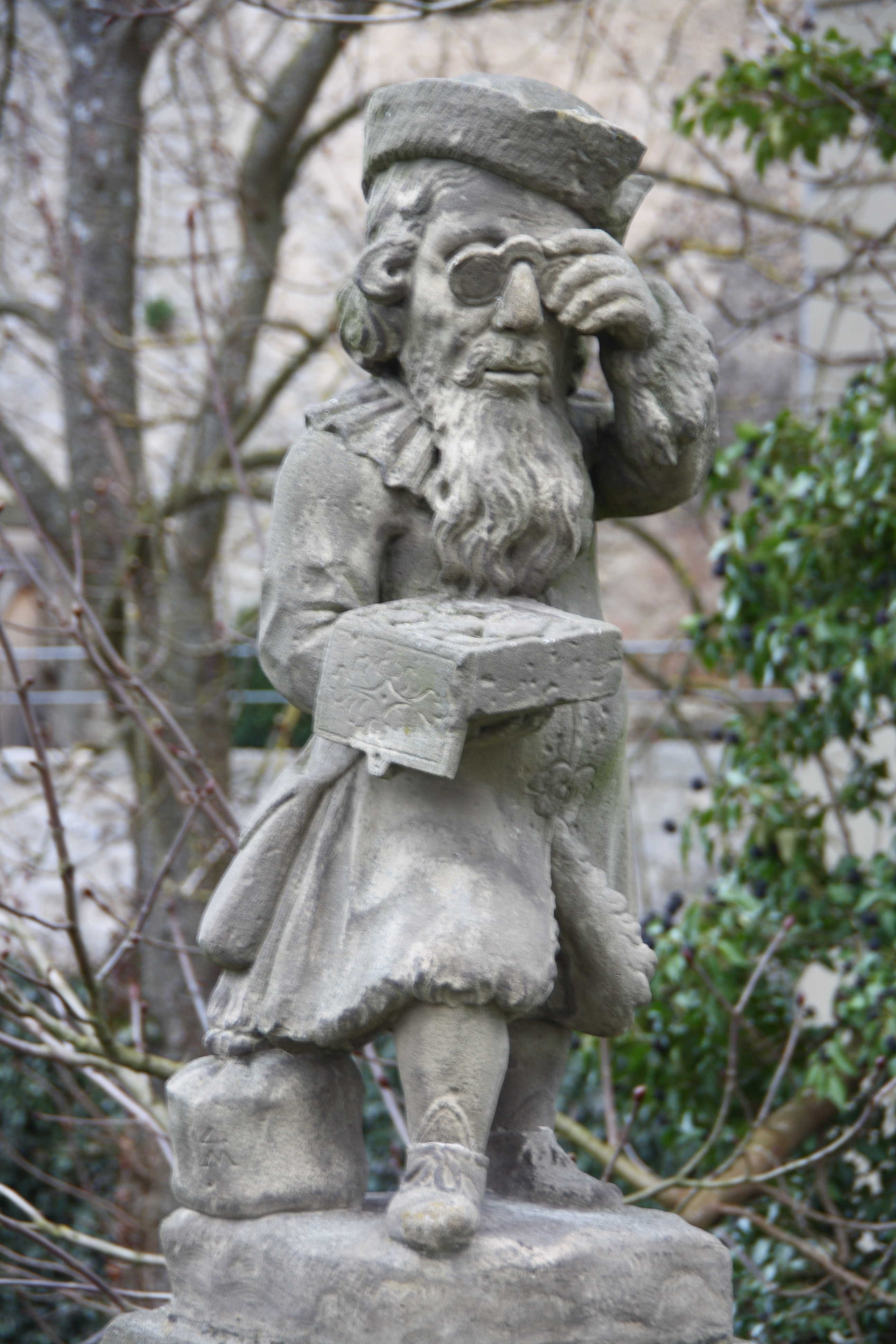
Lämmle Seeligmann, the court Jew

== At the Austrian court ==
The Holy Roman Emperors from the House of Habsburg kept a considerable number of court Jews. Among those of Emperor Ferdinand II are mentioned the following: Solomon and Ber Mayer, who furnished cloth for four squadrons of cavalry for the wedding of the Emperor and Eleonora of Mantua; Joseph Pincherle of Görz; Moses and Joseph Marburger (Morpurgo) of Gradisca; Ventura Pariente of Trieste; the physician Elijah Chalfon of Vienna; Samuel zum Drachen, Samuel zum Straussen, and Samuel zum Weissen Drachen of Frankfurt am Main; and Mordecai Meisel of Prague. A specially favored court Jew was Jacob Bassevi, the first Jew to be ennobled, with the title "von Treuenberg".

Important as court Jews were also Samuel Oppenheimer, who went from Heidelberg to Vienna, and Samson Wertheimer (Wertheimher) from Worms. Oppenheimer, who was appointed chief court factor, together with his two sons Emanuel and Wolf, and Wertheimer, who was at first associated with him, devoted their time and talents to the service of Austria and the House of Habsburg: during the Rhenish, French, Turkish, and Spanish wars they loaned millions of florins for provisions, munitions, etc. Wertheimer, who, by title at least, was also chief court factor to the electors of Mainz, the Electorate of the Palatinate, and Treves, received from the emperor a chain of honor with his miniature.

Samson Wertheimer was succeeded as court factor by his son Wolf. Contemporaneous with him was Leffmann Behrends, of Hanover, court factor and agent of the elector Ernest Augustus and of the duke Rudolf August of Brunswick. He also had relationships with several other rulers and high dignitaries.

Behrends' two sons, Mordecai Gumpel and Isaac, received the same titles as he, chief court factors and agents. Isaac Cohen's father-in-law, Behrend Lehman, called also Bärmann Halberstadt, was a court factor of Saxony, with the title of "Resident"; and his son Lehman Behrend was called to Dresden as court factor by King Augustus the Strong. Moses Bonaventura of Prague was also court Jew of Saxony in 1679.

== Intrigues of court Jews ==
The Model family were court Jews of the margraves of Ansbach about the middle of the seventeenth century. Especially influential was Marx Model, who had the largest business in the whole principality and extensively supplied the court and the army. He fell into disgrace through the intrigues of the court Jew Elkan Fränkel, member of a family that had been driven from Vienna.

Fränkel, a circumspect, energetic, and proud man, possessed the confidence of the margrave to such a degree that his advice was sought in the most important affairs of the state. Denounced by a certain Isaiah Fränkel, however, who desired to be baptized, an accusation was brought against Elkan Fränkel; and the latter was pilloried, scourged, and sent to the Würzburg for life imprisonment on November 2, 1712. He died there in 1720.

David Rost, Gabriel Fränkel, and, in 1730, Isaac Nathan (Ischerlein) were court Jews together with Elkan Fränkel; Ischerlein, through the intrigues of the Fränkels, suffered the same fate as Elkan Fränkel. Nevertheless, Nathan's son-in-law, Dessauer, became court Jew. Other court Jews of the princes of Ansbach were Michael Simon and Löw Israel (1743), Meyer Berlin, and Amson Solomon Seligmann (1763).

== The Great Elector ==
The Great Elector, Frederick William, also kept a court Jew, Israel Aaron (1670), who by his influence tried to prevent the influx of foreign Jews into Berlin. Other court Jews of Frederick William were Elias Gumperz in Cleves (died 1672), Berend Wulff (1675), and Solomon Fränkel (1678). More influential than any of these was Jost Liebmann.

Through his marriage with the widow of the above-named Israel Aaron, he succeeded to the latter's position, and was highly esteemed by the elector. He had continual quarrels with the court Jew of the crown prince, Markus Magnus. After his death, his influential position fell to his widow, the well-known Liebmannin, who was so well received by Frederick III (from 1701 King Frederick I of Prussia) that she could go unannounced into his cabinet.

== Other German courts ==
There were court Jews at all the petty German courts; e.g., Zacharias Seligmann (1694) in the service of the Prince of Hesse-Homburg, and others in the service of the dukes of Mecklenburg.

Others mentioned toward the end of the seventeenth century are: Bendix and Ruben Goldschmidt of Hamburg; Michael Hinrichsen of Glückstadt in Mecklenburg, who soon associated himself with Moses Israel Fürst, and whose son, Ruben Hinrichsen, in 1750 had a fixed salary as court agent.

About this time the court agent Wolf lived at the court of Frederick III of Mecklenburg-Strelitz. Disputes with the court Jews often led to protracted lawsuits.

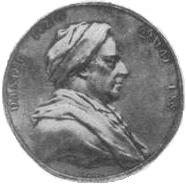
Medal for Daniel Itzig's seventieth birthday.

The last actual court Jews were Israel Jacobson, court agent of Brunswick, and Wolf Breidenbach, factor to the Elector of Hesse, both of whom occupy honorable positions in the history of the Jews.

== Examples of court Jews ==
In rough chronological order:

- Aaron of Lincoln (12th century)
- Elias of London (13th century)
- Abraham Senior (1412–1493)
- Isaac Abravanel (1437–1508), financier for Portuguese and Spanish courts
- Sir Edward Brampton (c. 1440–1508), a godson of King Edward IV, he was made the governor of Guernsey
- Abraham Zacuto (c. 1450–c. 1510)
- Moses and Rachel Fishel of Kraków, court Jews during the reign of John I Albert of Poland; Rachel was lady-in-waiting of the queen mother Elizabeth
- Josel of Rosheim (de) (1476–1554)
- Joseph Nasi (1524–1579), court Jew in the Ottoman Empire and Duke of Naxos
- Mordecai Meisel (Miška Marek Meisel) (1528–1601)
- Abramo Colorni (1544-1599)
- Jacob Bassevi von Treuenberg (a noble) (1580–1634)
- Chajim Fürst (ca. 1580–1653), court agent in Hamburg, elder of the Jewish community in Hamburg, richest Jew in Hamburg
- Moses Israel Fürst (1617–1692), court agent in Hamburg and Mecklenburg–Schwerin
- Leffmann Behrends (Liepmann Cohen) of Hanover (c. 1630–1714)
- Samuel Oppenheimer (1635–1703), military supplier for the Holy Roman Emperor
- Esther Liebmann (1649–1714), court Jew to King Frederick I of Prussia
- Samson Wertheimer (1658–1724), Austrian financier, chief rabbi of Hungary and Moravia, and rabbi of Eisenstadt
- Moses Benjamin Wulff (1661-1729)
- Issachar Berend Lehmann; de (1661–1730)
- Baron Peter Shafirov (1670–1739), vice-chancellor of Russia under Peter the Great
- Joseph Süß Oppenheimer (1698–1738), financier for Charles Alexander, Duke of Württemberg
- Aaron Beer († 1740) of Aurich and Frankfurt
- Löw Sinzheim (c. 1675–1744), court purveyor of Mainz
- Israel Edler von Hönigsberg (1724–1789), court agent and lessee of the tobacco monopoly from the Habsburgs. "Bankaldirektor" for Joseph II. First Austrian Jew to be ennobled without converting to Christianity (1789).
- Joachim Edler von Popper (1720–1795), court agent and lessee of the tobacco monopoly from the Habsburgs. Second Austrian Jew to be ennobled without needing to be converted (1790).
- Daniel Itzig (1723–1799), a court Jew of Frederick II the Great and Frederick William II of Prussia
- Raphael Kaulla († 1810), court Jew of the Duke of Württemberg
- Karoline Kaulla (1739–1809), court Jew of the Duke of Württemberg
- Mayer Amschel Rothschild (1744–1812), "court factor" for William I, Elector of Hesse
- Israel Jacobson (1768–1828), philanthropist and reformer, court agent of Brunswick
- Wolf Breidenbach (1751–1829), factor to the Elector of Hesse, father of Moritz Wilhelm August Breidenbach
- Bernhard von Eskeles (1753–1839), a court Jew of Joseph II and Francis II of the Holy Roman Empire and I of Austria

In fiction, Isaac the Jew in Walter Scott's Ivanhoe serves this purpose to Prince John and other nobles.

== See also ==
- Crown rabbi
- Hakham Bashi
- Jewish heraldry
- Jewish oath
- Judenhut
- Landesrabbiner
- List of British Jewish nobility and gentry
- List of European Jewish nobility
- Schutzjude
- Shtadlan
- Useful Jew
