= Rachela Fiszel =

16th century Court Jew and banker

Rachela Fiszel (fl. 1496 – fl.1519), was a Polish banker, primarily living and working in Krakow.

She was the Court Jew of the King of Poland from 1496 until 1519. She served in this post after the death of her husband, Mojżesz. She was the banker of Aleksander Jagiellończyk, Kazimierz Jagiellończyk, Jan Olbracht and Zygmunt Stary. Her son in law, Aszer Lemel, was a rabbi.

Her sons in law, Aszer Lemel and Jacob Pollak were rabbis.
