= Alexander Jagiellon =

Grand Duke of Lithuania (1492–1506); King of Poland (1501–1506)

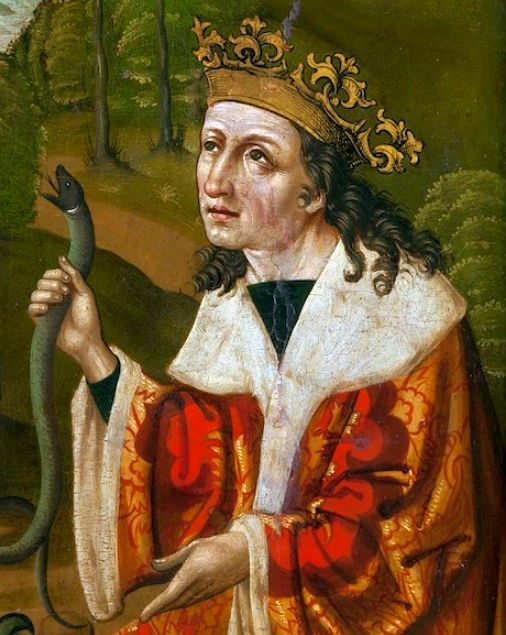
- As king of the Saracens, probably the most accurate portrait of Alexander, c. 1504.

Grand Duke of Lithuania
- Reign: 30 July 1492 – 19 August 1506
- Predecessor: Casimir
- Successor: Sigismund
- Co-ruler: John Albert (disputed) (Note: John Albert styled himself as the Supreme Duke sometime after Alexander's election as the Grand Duke in July 1492. His title was recognized by Alexander but not by Lithuanian Council of Lords.)

King of Poland
- Reign: 3 October 1501 – 19 August 1506
- Coronation: 12 December 1501 in Wawel Cathedral
- Predecessor: John I Albert
- Successor: Sigismund I the Old
- Born: 5 August 1461; Kraków, Poland
- Died: 19 August 1506 (aged 45); Vilnius, Lithuania
- Burial: Vilnius Cathedral, Vilnius, Lithuania (1506)
- Spouse: Helena of Moscow
- Dynasty: Jagiellon
- Father: Casimir IV Jagiellon
- Mother: Elizabeth of Hungary
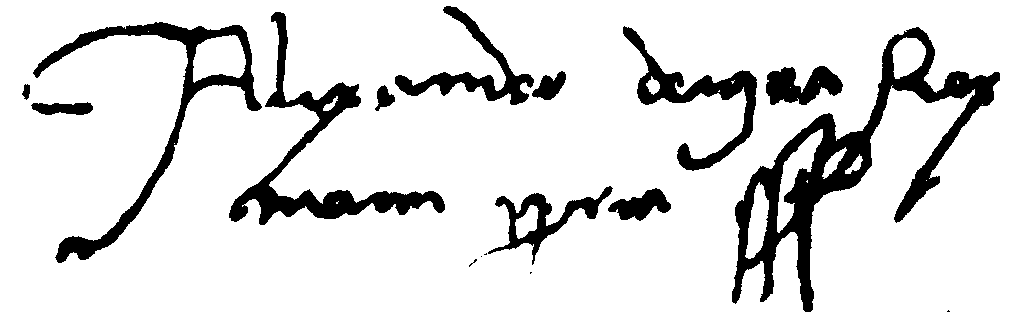
- Signature

Alexander Jagiellon (Note: Polish: Aleksander Jagiellończyk; Belarusian: Аляксандр Ягелончык; Lithuanian: Aleksandras Jogailaitis.) (5 August 1461 – 19 August 1506) was Grand Duke of Lithuania from 1492 and King of Poland from 1501 until his death in 1506. He was the fourth son of Casimir IV Jagiellon and a member of the Jagiellonian dynasty. Alexander was elected the Grand Duke of Lithuania upon the death of his father per his father's suggestion, and became the King of Poland upon the death of his elder brother John I Albert.

== Early life ==
Alexander was born as the fourth son of King Casimir IV Jagiellon and Elizabeth of Austria, daughter of the King Albert II of Germany. At the time of his father's death in 1492, his eldest brother Vladislaus had already become king of Bohemia (1471) and Hungary and Croatia (1490), and the next oldest brother, Saint Casimir, had died (1484) after leading an ascetic and pious life in his final years, resulting in his eventual canonisation.

At his deathbed King Casimir recommended that John Albert be chosen as his successor in Poland, while Alexander would become the next ruler of Lithuania. Per rules of the political union between Poland and Lithuania, the choice of the monarch of each country should have not happened without consent of the nobles from the other country. However, the Lithuanians chose to elect Alexander to be their Grand Duke in July 1492 without consulting Polish nobility (szlachta). On 27 August 1492 John Albert was elected in Poland as the new King and, while accepting his brother's position in Lithuania, he claimed the status of dominant co-ruler over him as the Supreme Duke, which was recognized by Alexander but not by Lithuanian Council of Lords.

Alexander maintained a Lithuanian court and multiple Lithuanian priests served in his royal chapel of the Polish royal court.

== Reign ==
=== Grand Duke of Lithuania (1492–1506) ===
The greatest challenge that Alexander faced upon assuming control of the grand duchy was an attack on Lithuania by Grand Prince Ivan III of Russia and his allies, the Crimean Khanate's Tatars, which commenced shortly after his accession. Ivan III considered himself the heir to the lands of Kievan Rus', and was striving to take back the territory previously gained by Lithuania. Unable to successfully stop the incursions, Alexander sent a delegation to Moscow to make a peace settlement, which was signed in 1494 and ceded extensive land over to Ivan. In an additional effort to instill peace between the two countries, Alexander was betrothed to Helena, the daughter of Ivan III; they were married in Vilnius on 15 February 1495. The peace did not last long, however, as Ivan III resumed hostilities in 1500. The most Alexander could do was to garrison Smolensk and other strongholds and employ his wife Helena to mediate another truce between him and her father after the disastrous Battle of Vedrosha (1500). In the terms of this truce, which was concluded on 25 March 1503, Lithuania had to surrender about a third of its territory to the nascent expansionist Russian state; Alexander pledged not to touch lands including Moscow, Novgorod, Ryazan, and others, while a total of 19 cities were ceded. The historian Edvardas Gudavičius stated:

The war of 1492–1494 was a kind of reconnaissance mission conducted by the united Russia. [The terms of] the ceasefire of 1503 showed the planned political aggression of Russia, its undoubted military superiority. The concept of the sovereign of all Russia, put forward by Ivan III, did not leave room for the existence of the Lithuanian state.

=== King of Poland (1501–1506) ===
On 17 June 1501, Alexander's older brother John I Albert died suddenly. Alexander was elected the King on 3 October and crowned on 12 December of the same year. Alexander's shortage of funds immediately made him subservient to the Polish Senate and szlachta, who deprived him of control of the mint (then one of the most lucrative sources of revenue for the Polish kings), curtailed his prerogatives, and generally endeavored to reduce him to a subordinate position. In 1505, the Sejm of the Kingdom of Poland passed the Act of Nihil novi, which forbade the king to issue laws without the consent of the nobility, represented by the two legislative chambers, except for laws governing royal cities, crown lands, mines, fiefdoms, royal peasants, and Jews. This was another step in Poland's progression towards a "Noble's Democracy".

During Alexander's reign, Poland suffered additional humiliation at the hands of its subject principality, Moldavia. Only the death of Stephen III of Moldavia, the great hospodar of Moldavia, enabled Poland still to hold her own on the Danube river. Meanwhile, the liberality of Pope Julius II, who issued no fewer than 29 bulls in favor of Poland and granted Alexander Peter's Pence and other financial help, enabled him to restrain somewhat the arrogance of the Teutonic Order.

Alexander Jagiellon never felt at home in Poland, and bestowed his favor principally upon his fellow Lithuanians, the most notable of whom was the wealthy Lithuanian magnate Michael Glinski, who justified his master's confidence by his great victory over the Tatars at Kletsk (5 August 1506), news of which was brought to Alexander on his deathbed in Vilnius.

== Legacy ==
According to Giedrė Mickūnaitė, interwar Lithuanian historians assumed that Alexander was the last ruler of the Gediminid dynasty who understood the Lithuanian language, yet did not speak it; however, there is a lack of sources supporting this hypothesis. In addition, Alexander's own Latin charters from the 1490s contain Ruthenian words to explain legal terms, marked as in vulgari ('in the vernacular'). In 1504, a participant of the Toruń assembly recorded that Alexander addressed a Tatar envoy in Ruthenian through an interpreter. Furthermore, in a 1503 charter, Ivan Sapieha, who worked in the Slavic chancery of the Grand Duchy of Lithuania, was described as secretarius Ruthenicus ('secretary of the Ruthenian language') in papal bulls.

In 1931, during the refurbishment of Vilnius Cathedral, the forgotten sarcophagus of Alexander was discovered and has since been put on display.

== Gallery ==
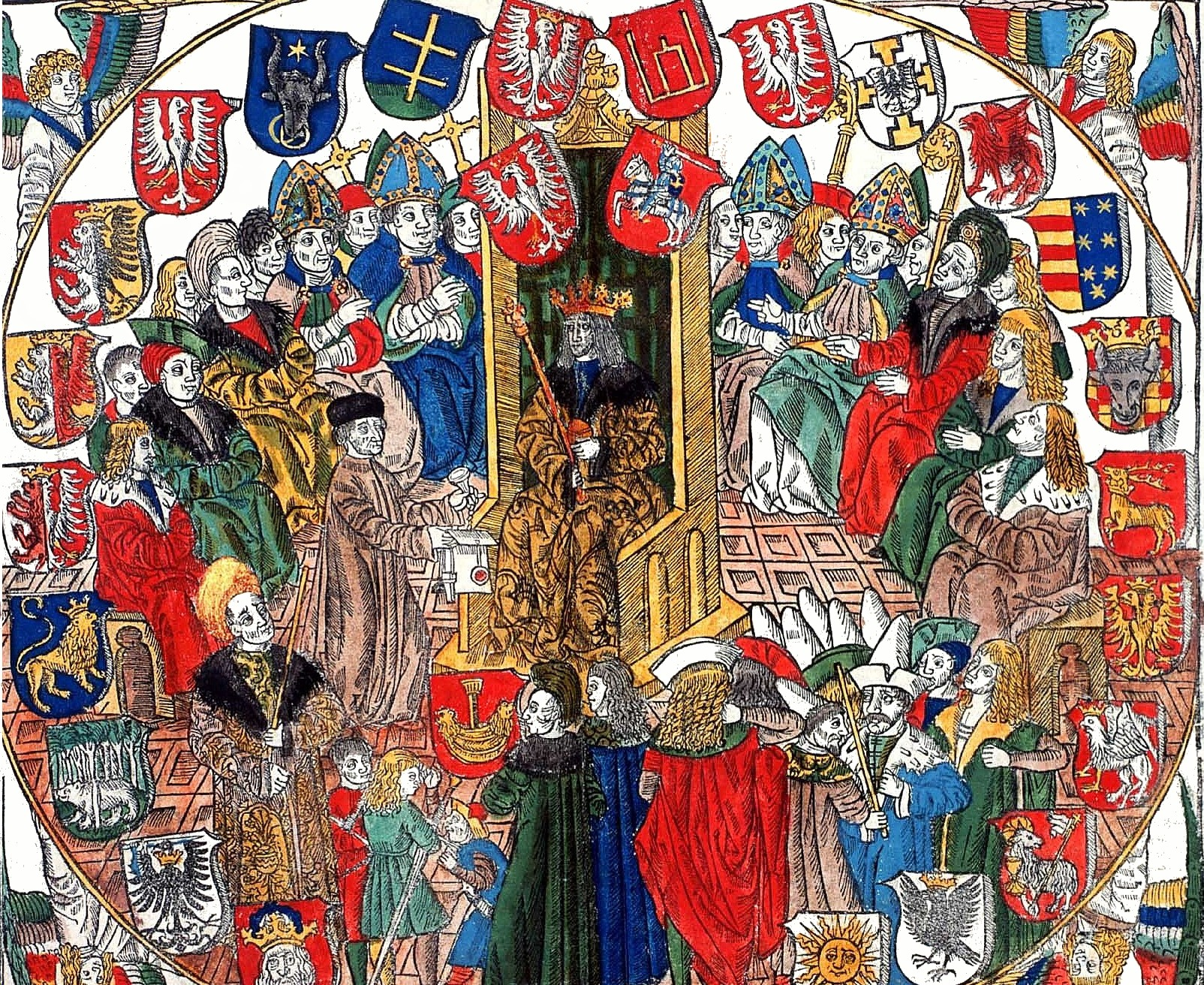
King Alexander in Polish Senate, 1506.

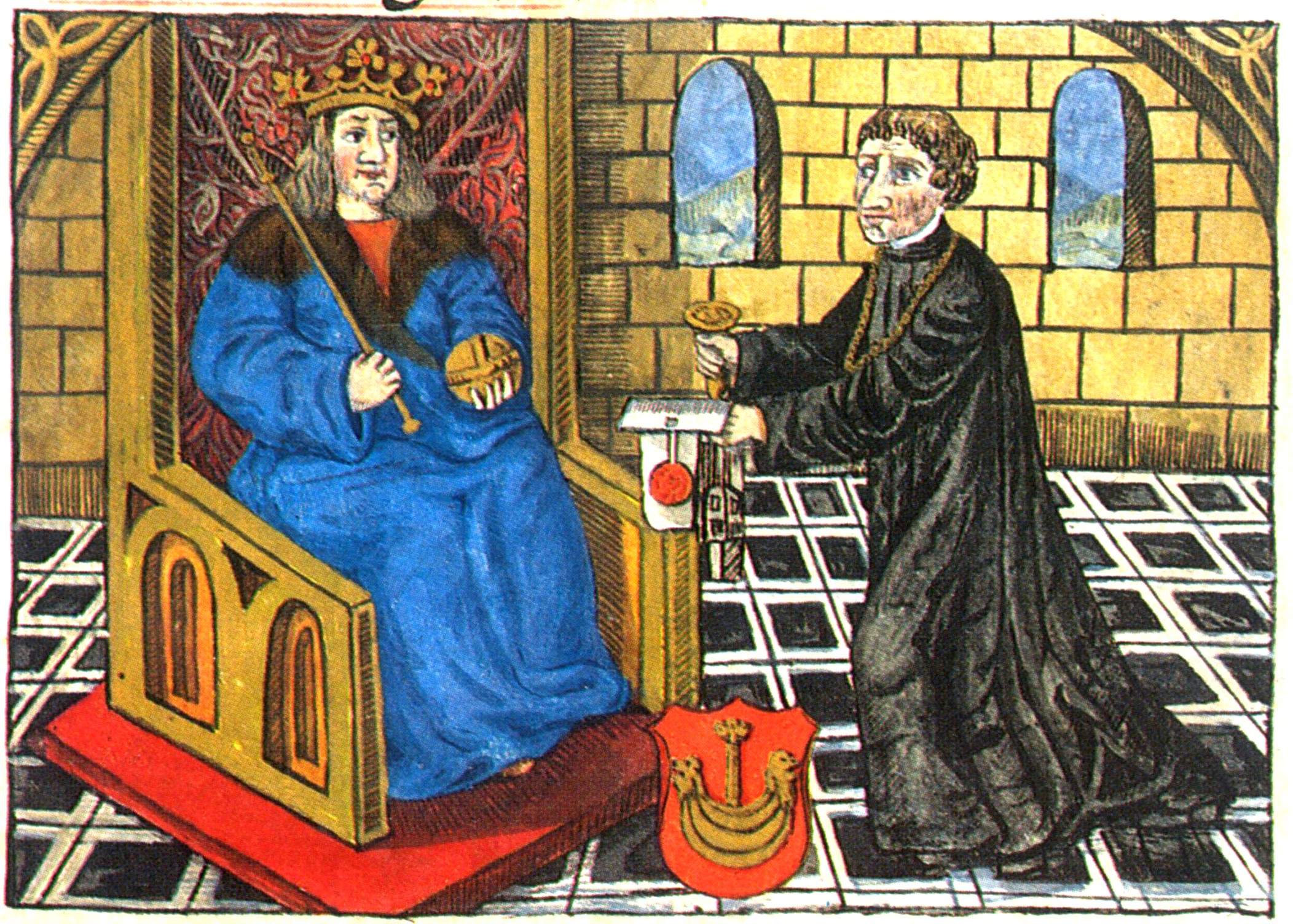
Alexander and his kanclerz Jan Łaski.

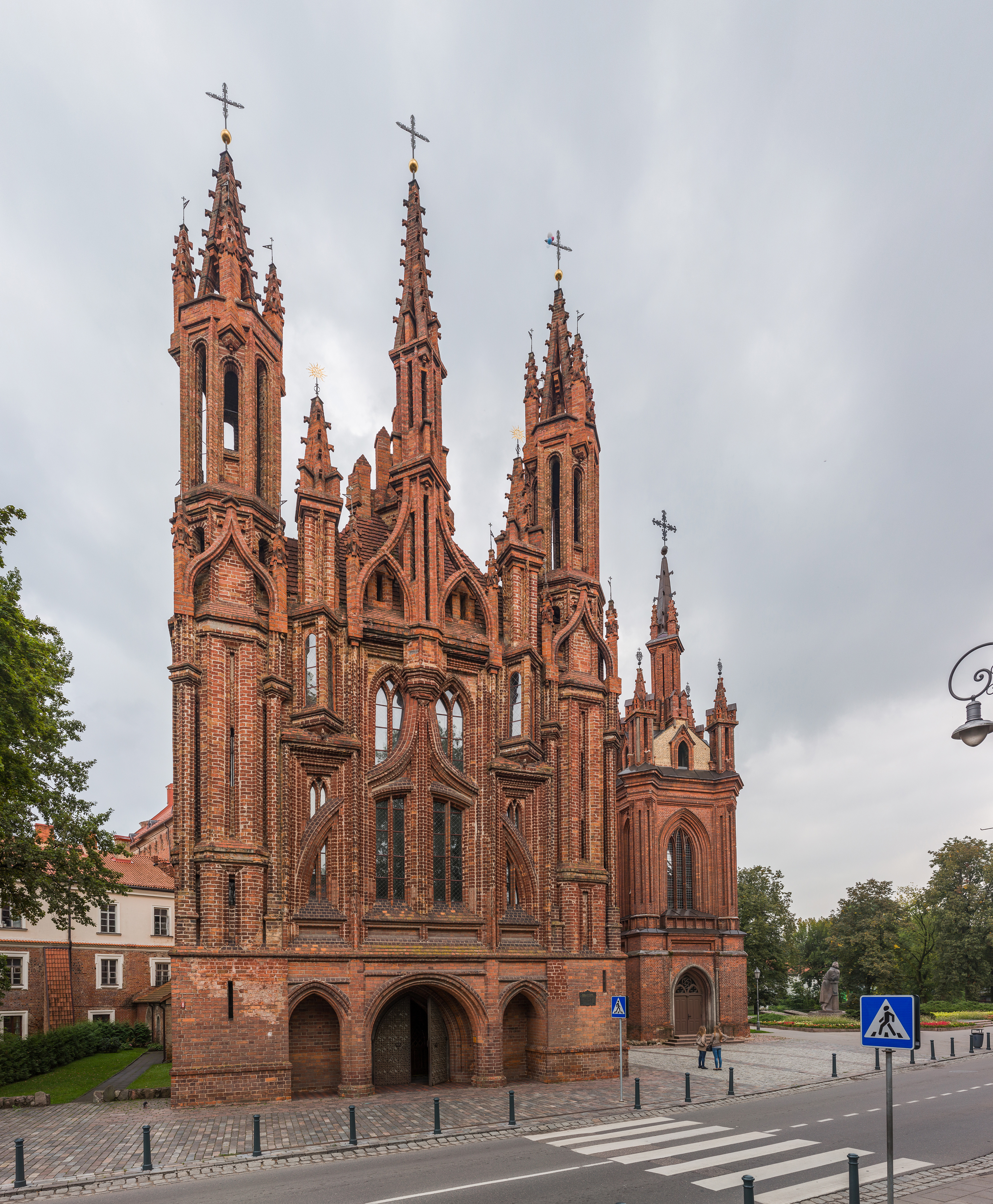
Gothic St. Anne's Church in Vilnius was constructed on his initiative in 1495–1500.

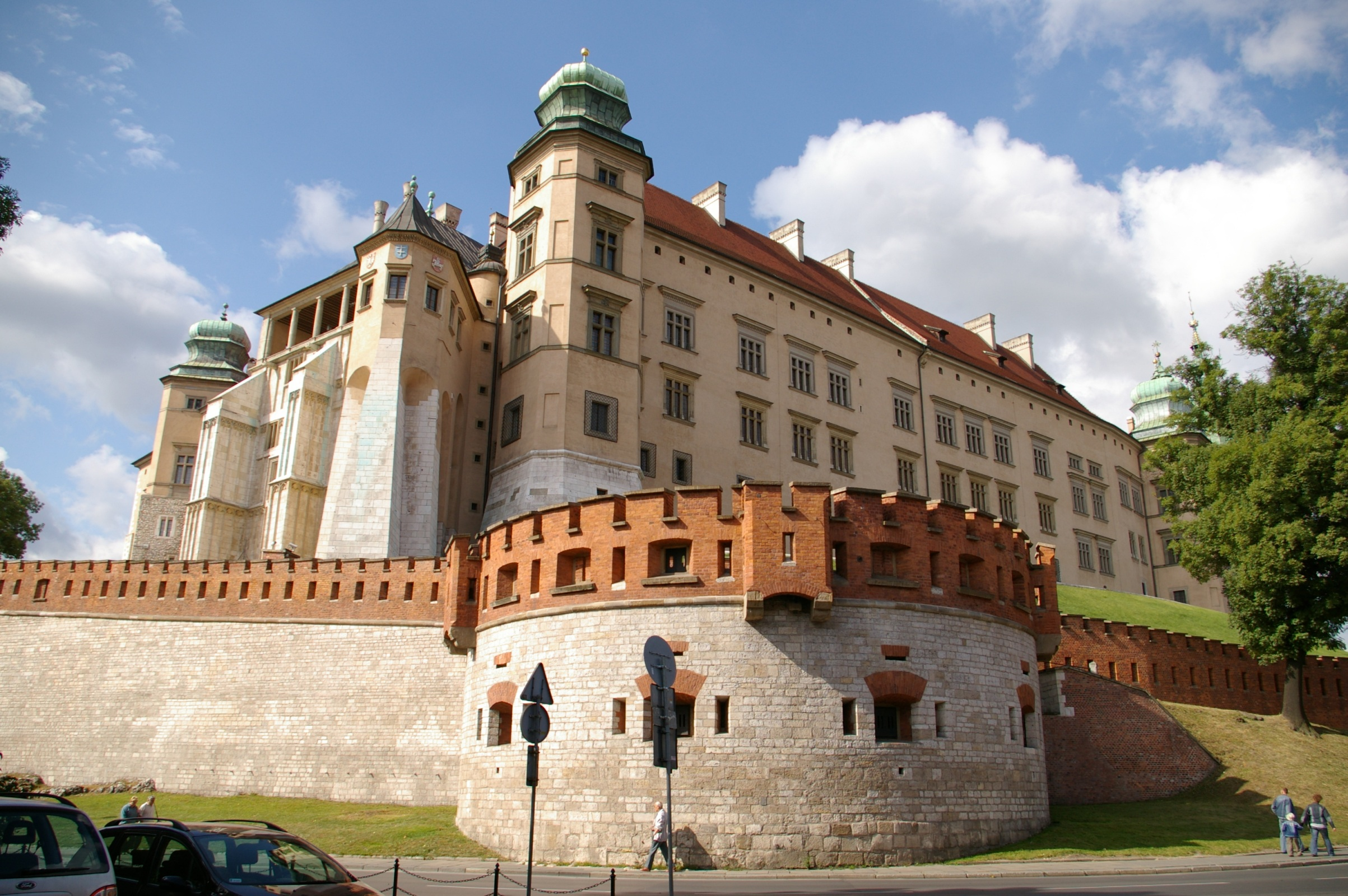
In 1504, he ordered to rebuild the Wawel in a Renaissance style.

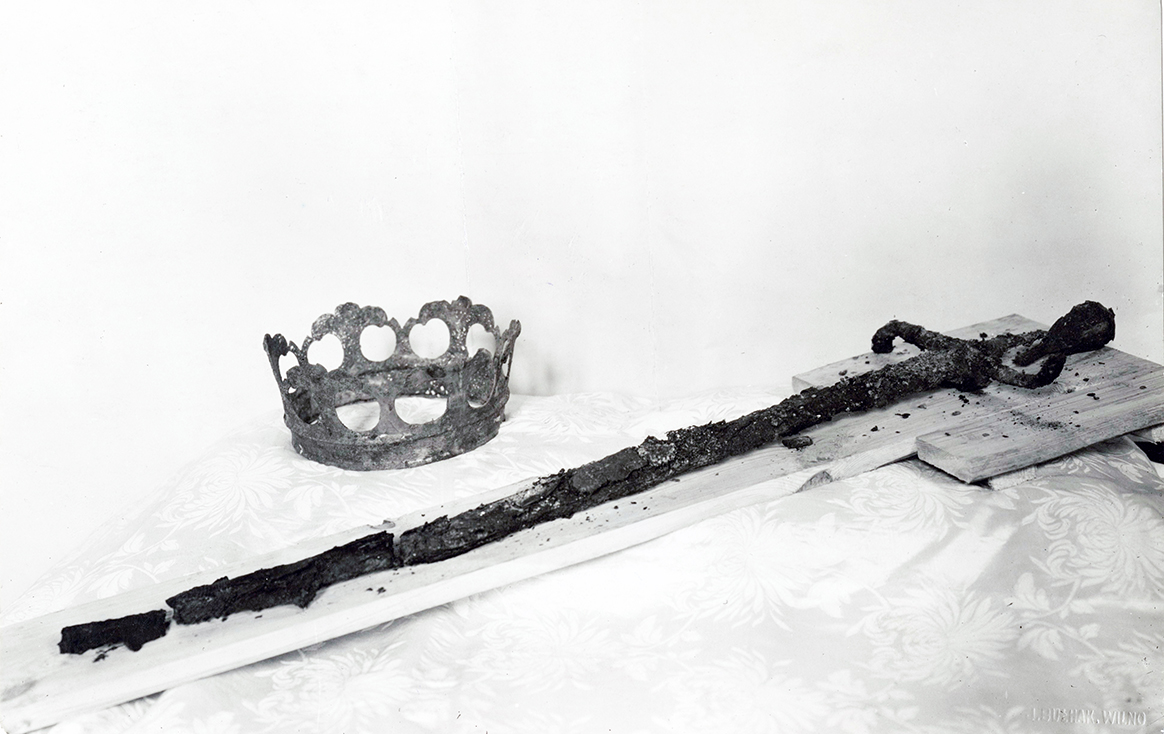
Crown and sword of Alexander Jagiellon

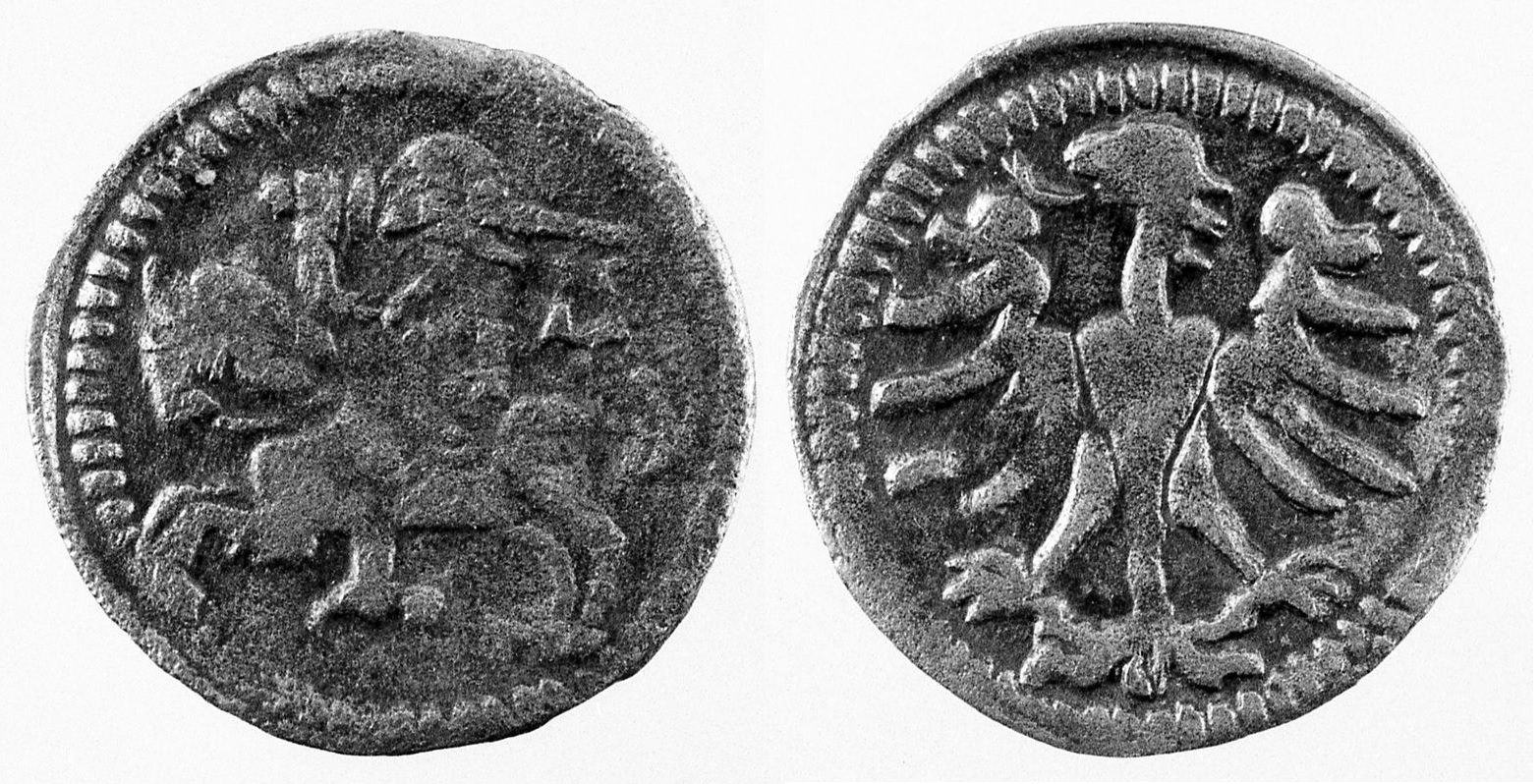
Lithuanian coin with the coat of arms of Lithuania and Poland

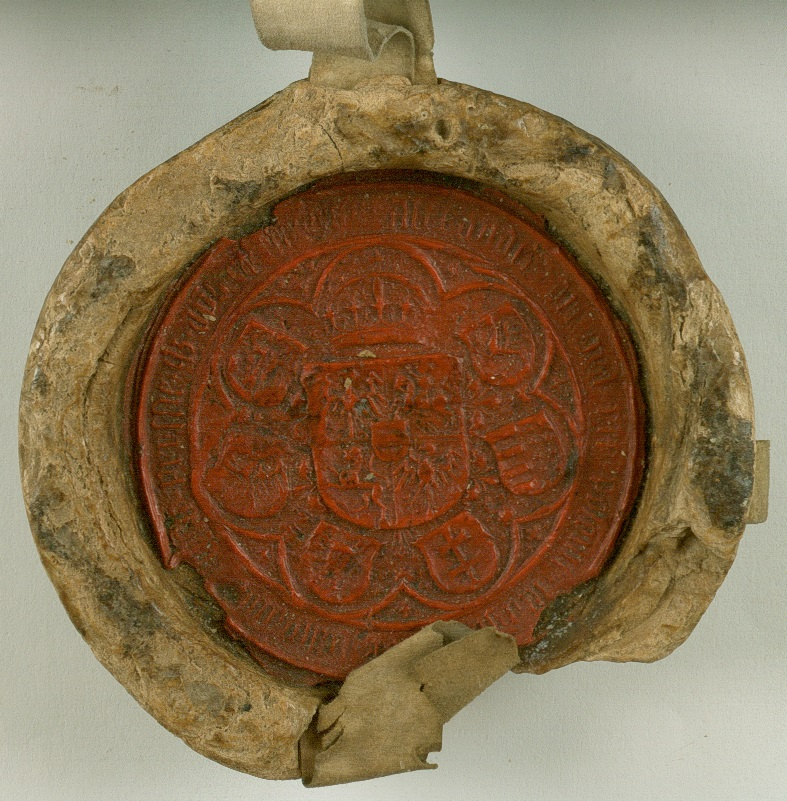
Seal of Alexander Jagiellon, 1504

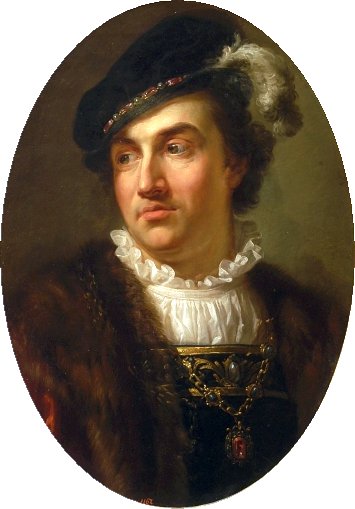
Fantasy portrait by Bacciarelli

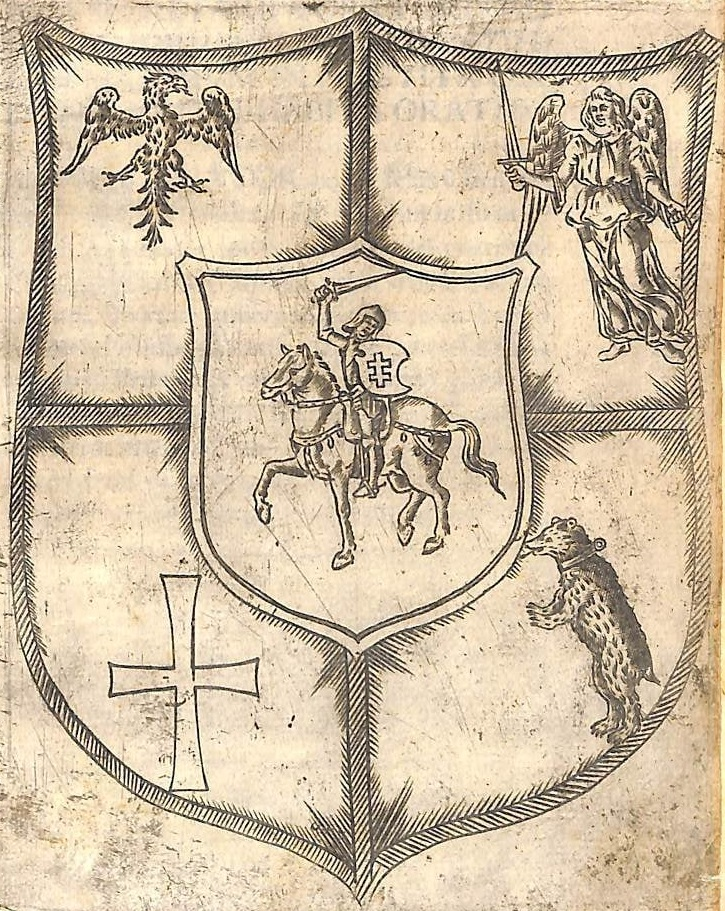
Coat of arms

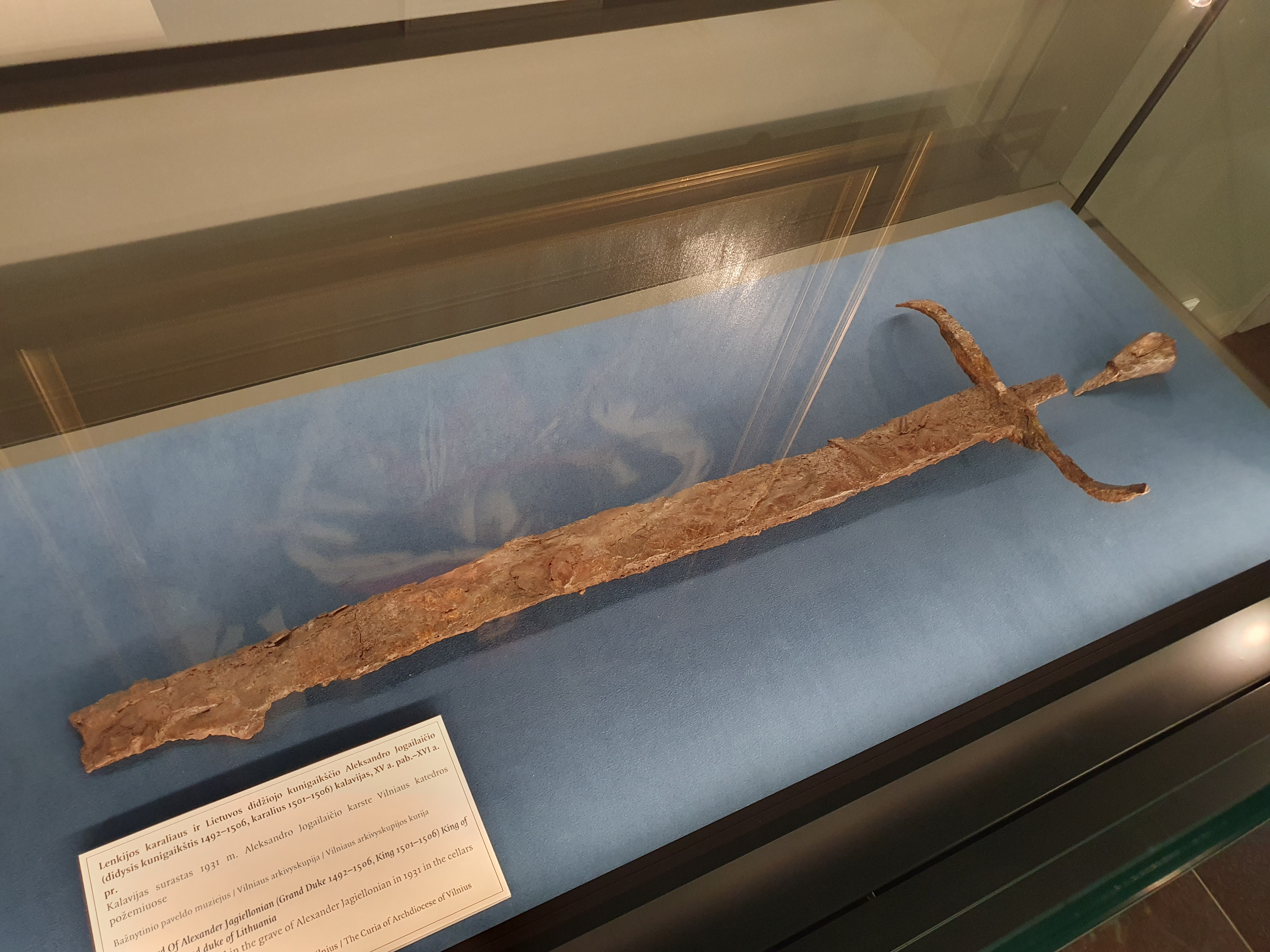
Sword of Alexander Jagiellon in 2023

== See also ==
- History of Poland during the Jagiellonian dynasty
- Rachela Fiszel
- Sejm walny
- Church of St. Anne, Vilnius

== Bibliography ==
- "Александр Ягеллон" . Brockhaus and Efron Encyclopedic Dictionary (in Russian). 1906.

Preceded by Casimir IV Jagiellon	Grand Duke of Lithuania; 1492 – 1506 with John I Albert as Supreme Duke	Succeeded by Sigismund I the Old
Preceded by John I Albert	King of Poland; 1501 – 1506	Succeeded by Sigismund I the Old
