= Jacob Bassevi =

Italian financier and Court Jew (1570–1634)

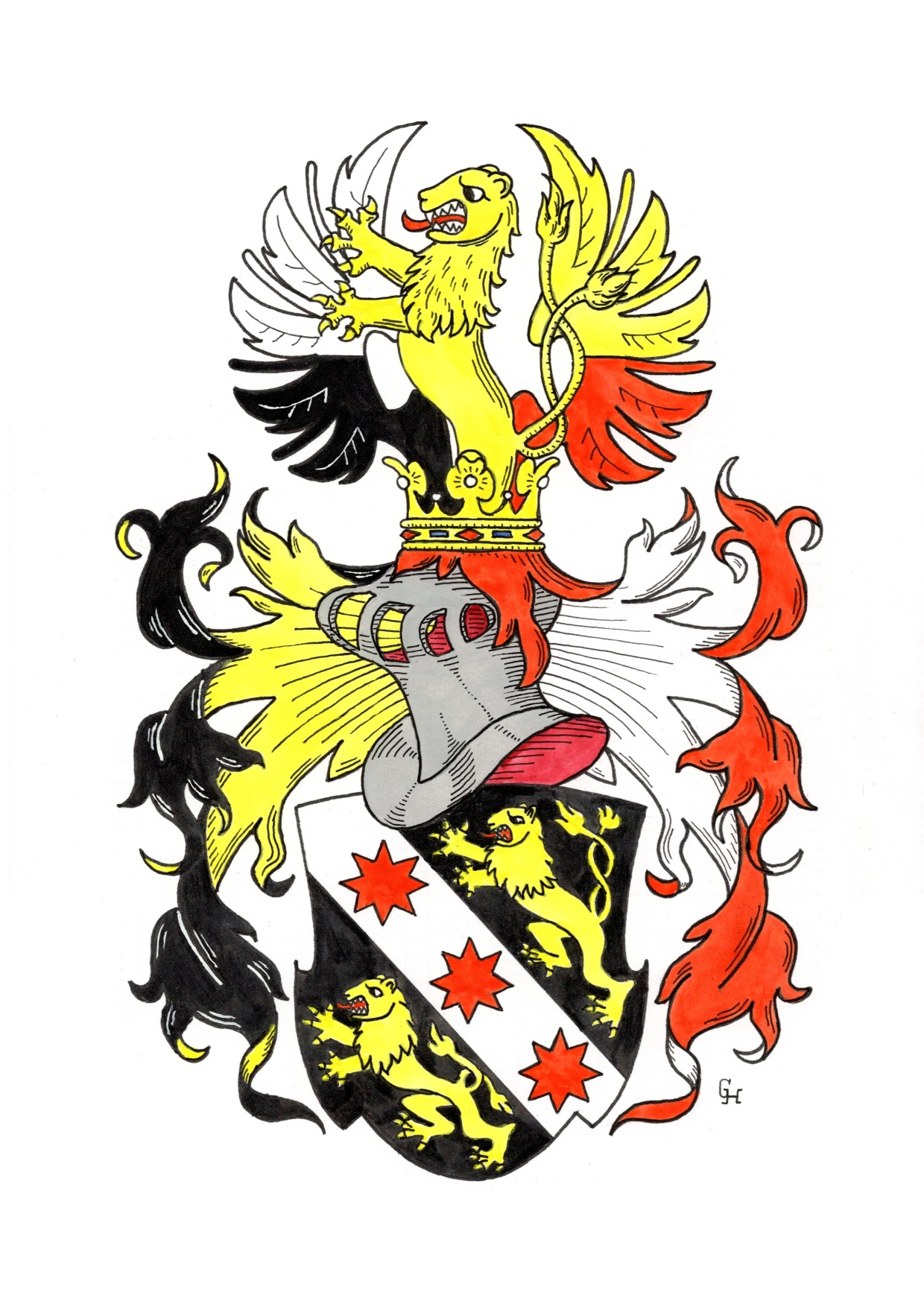
Coat of arms of Jacob Bassevi

Jacob Batsheba Bassevi von Treuenberg (born Schmieles; 1570 – 2 May 1634) was an Italian Court Jew and financier.

== Biography ==
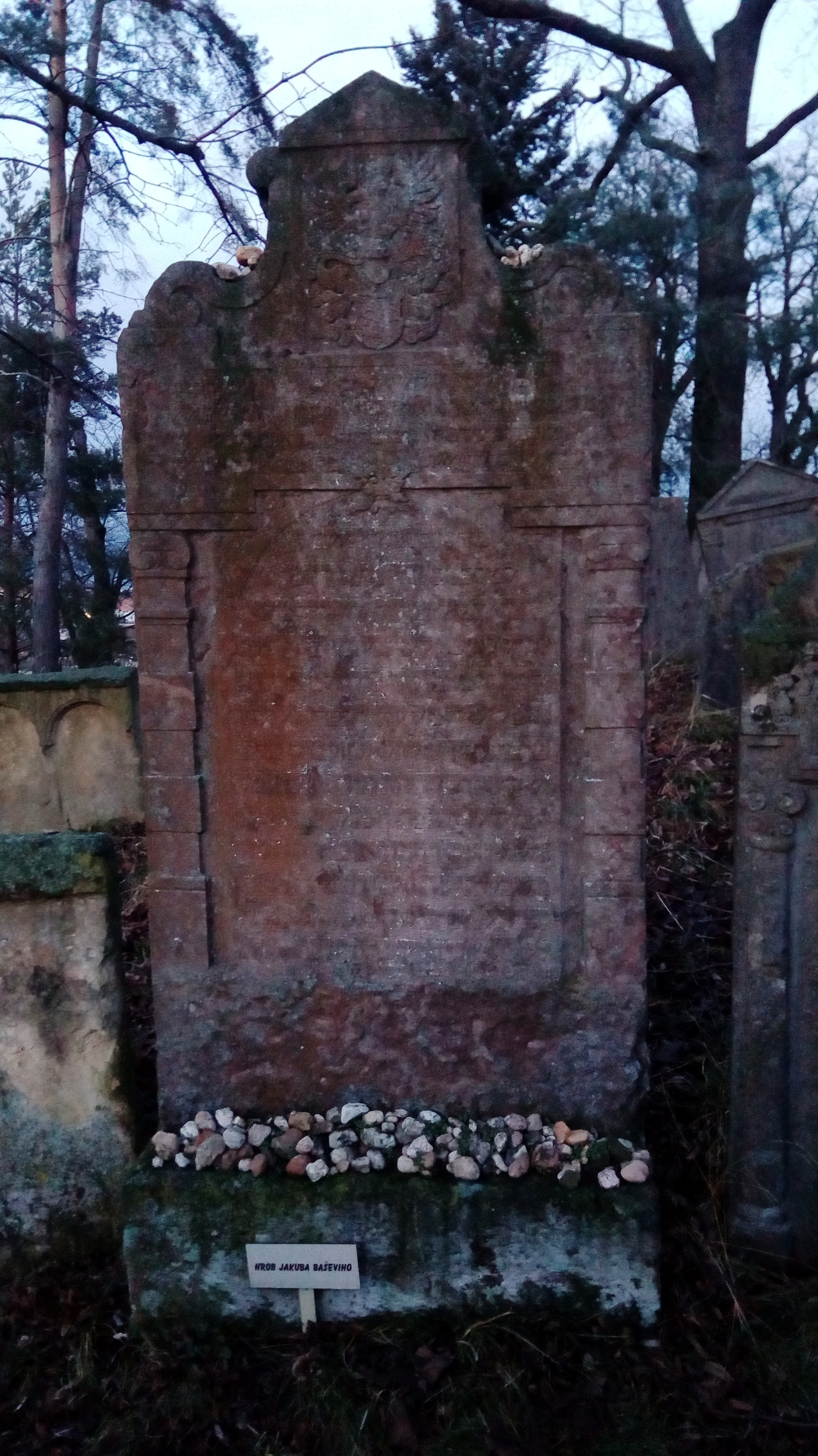
Bassevi's gravestone in the Jewish cemetery in Mladá Boleslav, Czech Republic

He was born in 1570 in Verona. Bassevi, sometimes also written Baschevi, was a son of Avraham Basch who originated from Italy. Early in his life he specialized in trading with silver which was the main component of the coins and currencies at his time. He ultimately became very wealthy, and stood in high favor with the emperors Rudolf II, Matthias, and Ferdinand II, to whom he frequently rendered financial assistance, particularly to Ferdinand, who needed large sums of money for the prosecution of the Thirty Years' War (1618–1648).

Bassevi, in recognition of his services, was raised to the nobility by Ferdinand, receiving the title von Treuenberg, and a coat of arms consisting of a two yellow Bohemian (two tailed) lions and 3 eight-pointed red stars in a bend argent (white diagonal band) on a field of black (Graetz appears to be mistaken about the "blue lion and eight stars", see references). Ferdinand also bestowed upon him the right "to engage in any business whatever, in any part of the empire, whether cities, towns, or market-places, in Prague and Vienna, and other places where Jews are allowed to reside or are not; to acquire property and to reside anywhere he pleases. His property in any form to be free from taxes, imposts, and duties; he is allowed to reside in the imperial quarters; and he is responsible to no tribunal, except that of the marshal of the court". Privileges were also granted to him by Rudolf and Matthias, all of them being hereditary. The supposition that he was minister of finance to Ferdinand is unfounded.

As a representative of the Jewish community, reference to Bassevi is first found in 1616. He always exerted his influence on behalf of the Jews of the empire and of Italy; and it was due to his efforts, combined with those of other Jewish capitalists, that the Hebrew quarter in Prague was protected by a military guard against the attacks of the soldiery after the decisive Battle of White Mountain, Bohemia, in 1620.

Bassevi was a warm friend of Rabbi Lipmann Heller, and befriended him during the latter's arrest (5 July 1629) and dismissal from office (14 August 1629); contributing from his own funds one-fifth of the fine of 12,000 imposed upon Heller. Bassevi was very charitable, and gave large sums for the support of the poor of Palestine.

On account of some trouble, the nature of which is not known, Bassevi in 1631 removed from Prague to Jičín, where he lived for a year. He died on 2 May 1634 in Mladá Boleslav, Bohemia.
