= Schutzjude =

Protected status for German Jews

Schutzjude (German: [ˈʃʊtsˌjuːdə], "protected Jew") was a status for German Jews granted by the imperial, princely or royal courts.

Within the Holy Roman Empire, except some eastern territories gained by the Empire in the 11th and 12th centuries (e.g. Brandenburg), Jews usually had the status of Servi camerae regis. This status included imperial protection and the levying of special taxes on the Jews for the Empire's treasury (Latin: camera regis). But the emperors, always short of money, alienated – by sale or pledge – their privilege to levy extra taxes on Jews, not all at once, but territory by territory to different creditors and purchasers. Thus Jews lost their – not always reliable – imperial protection.

Many territories that gained supremacy over the Jews living within their boundaries subsequently expelled them. After the general expulsions of the Jews from a given territory often only single Jews – if any at all – would be granted the personal privilege to reside within the territory. This personal privilege, documented by a Schutzbrief (writ of protection), a Geleitsbrief (writ of escort), or (in Brandenburg) a Patent, was sometimes inheritable by only one son (in rare instances, by all sons), and was sometimes uninheritable. Jews holding such a privilege were thus called Schutzjuden, vergeleitete Juden, or Patentjuden, as opposed to Jews who had no right of residence, who were known as unvergeleitete Juden. The latter were not allowed to marry, and might spend their life unmarried as a member of the household of a privileged relative or employer.

For example, in October 1763 King Frederick II of Brandenburg-Prussia granted Moses Mendelssohn, until then under protection by being employed by a Patentjude, a personal, uninheritable privilege, which assured his right to undisturbed residence in Berlin. His wife and children, who had no independent permission to reside, lost their status of family member of a Patentjude when Mendelssohn died in 1786. They were later granted multi-son inheritable Patents. In 1810 Stein's Prussian reforms introduced a freely inheritable Prussian citizenship for all subjects of the king, doing away with the different prior legal status of the Estates, such as the nobility, the burghers of the chartered cities, the unfree peasants, the officialdom at the court, the Patent Jews, and the Huguenots.

== See also ==
- Court Jew
- Crown rabbi
- Hakham Bashi
- Landesrabbiner
- Shtadlan
- Useful Jew
