= Makhlouf Eldaoudi =

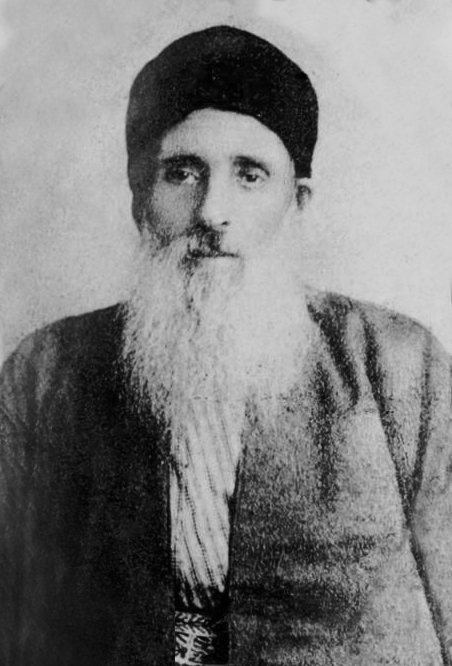
- Hakham Bashi of Akko, Haifa, Tzfat and Tiberias (1889–1909)
- Born: 1825; Marrakesh, Morocco
- Died: 1909 (aged 83–84); Safed, Ottoman Empire
- Burial place: Safed Old Jewish Cemetery

Makhlouf Eldaoudi (Hebrew: מכלוף אלדאודי; 1825–1909) was the Hakham Bashi (Turkish for the Chief Rabbi) of the Jewish communities of Acre, Haifa, Safed and Tiberias (1889–1909).

He was born in Marrakesh, Morocco, and his family later migrated to the Galilee. His father, David, descended from the poet Hiyya al-Daudi, and belonged to the Jewish elite. Eldaoudi became a rabbi during his youth. He made trips as official rabbi to many countries of the world, since he spoke several languages.

In 1889 he was designated Hakham Bashi, with the permission of the Ottoman sultan Abdul Hamid II. During his period as Hakham Bashi he tried to recover the Jews who wished to convert to other religions. His son, Selim, narrated in his Memories all the otherwise unknown episodes in which his father took part.

Makhlouf Eldaoudi died in Tzfat at the age of 83. He was buried in the Safed Old Jewish Cemetery.

== Sources ==
- Szekely, Yaffa: Unknown episodes in the public activity of Rabbi Makhlouf Eldaoudi in his early years as Hakham Bashi of Akko and Haifa at Beth Hatefutsoth
- (in Hebrew) daoudi.co.il
