= Vivelin of Strasbourg =

Alsatian Jewish financier

Vivelin of Strasbourg (Note: He was also known as “Vivelin Rufus” (Latin), “Vivian le Rous” (French), or “Vivelin der Rote” (German), which all means “Vivelin the Red”.) (d. after 1347) was an Alsatian Jewish financier in the 14th century, presumably one of the richest persons within the Holy Roman Empire in that time. He lived in Strasbourg and primarily dealt with the Archbishop of Trier, Baldwin of Luxembourg, but also with the King of England, Edward III, as he led a consortium that lent 140,000 florins to Edward III on the eve of the Hundred Years' War, in 1339.

He is not found in documents after 1347, and might have died during the Strasbourg pogrom of 1349, which saw almost 2,000 Jews being burned alive at the stake.
