= Shtadlan =

Intercessor for a local European Jewish community

A shtadlan (Hebrew: שְׁתַדְּלָן, IPA: [ʃtadˈlan]; Yiddish: שתּדלן, IPA: [ˈʃtadln̩]; plural shtadlanim) was an intercessor for a local European Jewish community. They represented the interests of the community, especially those of a town's ghetto, and worked as a "lobbyist" negotiating with the authorities holding power for the safety and benefit of Jews. The process of Jewish intercession is known as shtadlanut (Yiddish: שתּדלנות).

Shtadlanim relied on many tactics to intercede on the behalf of the Jewish community. These included emotional appeals, such as begging, rational appeals such as trying to implement charters or decrees, and also gifts of money or other goods to gain favor. Elyakim Zelig from Jampol, reported specifically on the need to beg for the Pope’s favor during a mission to Rome in 1757, in which he tried to gain support for defending Jews against blood libel.

Typically, a Jewish community (qahal) governed its own internal affairs. The interactions with the outside society, such as tax collection and enforcement of various restrictions and compulsions imposed on the community, were arranged by an internal governing board.

The shtadlan emerged to prominence in 17th century Europe, with the rise of absolutism, as an intermediary between the resident Jewish community and the monarchical government in control of the region. The position was appointed by the government, and could even be named as a royal official. Although he officially represented the Jewish community only, the shtadlan became a tool of the government.

Shtadlanut played a significant role in the Jewish community, especially in the Polish-Lithuanian Commonwealth. One prominent shtadlan was Barukh ben David Yavan, born in the early 1700s. Yavan was instrumental in many secret missions between the king of Poland, Augustus III and Frederick II of Prussia, helping to end the War of the Austrian Succession. Yavan was also in contact with a papal nuncio in Warsaw allowing him to save many Talmuds after the Kamieniec disputation that led to most Talmuds being burned. Jacob Teitel, born in 1851 under czarist Russian rule, is another example of an influential shtadlan. After a pogrom began in the city of Saratov, he used his connection to the regional governor to stop the anti-Jewish actions.

During the late 19th century, the use of the press and public opinion as leverage for shtadlanus activity became the most important change in the work of the shadlan, becoming closely associated with relief efforts for victims of pogroms in Russia as well as the early foundings of Political Zionism.

Traditionally, shtadlanim were seen as great protectors of Jewish communities, and received approbation from the communities' governing Jewish religious authorities.

== See also ==
- Court Jew
- Crown rabbi
- Hakham Bashi
- Issachar Berend Lehmann
- Josel of Rosheim
- Landesrabbiner
- Mordecai Maisel
- Isaac Rülf
- Schutzjude
- Chaim Michael Dov Weissmandl
- Esther
