= Aron Elias Seligmann =

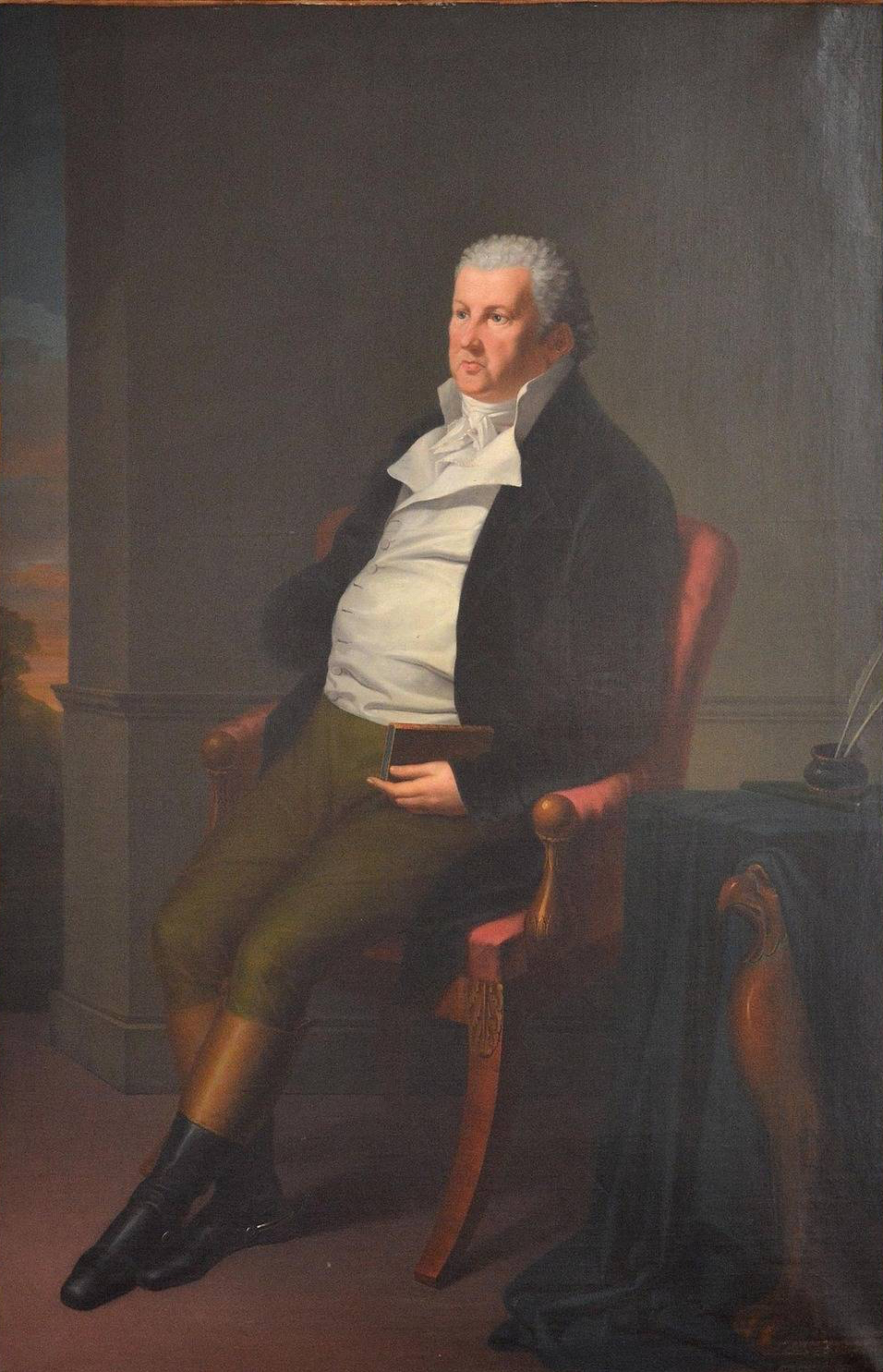

Aron Elias Seligmann, baron von Eichthal, (26 April 1747 – 11 January 1824) was a German Jewish financier. He served as court Jew for Charles Theodore and Maximilian I Joseph of Bavaria. After converting to Catholicism he was ennobled in 1814 as Freiherr von Eichthal.
