= Moses Israel Fürst =

Moses Israel Fürst (died circa 1692) was a tobacco merchant and financier of Hamburg, Germany. He was also active as a court Jew, a term describing the role of historical Jewish bankers or businessmen who lent money and managed finances of some of the European noble houses. From 1688 onwards, Fürst held the tobacco monopoly in the state of Mecklenburg-Schwerin together with fellow merchant Michael Hinrichsen.
