= Lilian R. Furst =

British-American literary scholar (1931-2009)

- Born: Lilian Renée Furst; 30 June 1931; Vienna, Austria
- Died: 11 September 2009 (aged 78); Chapel Hill, North Carolina, U.S.
- Occupation: Literary scholar
- Awards: Guggenheim Fellowship (1982)

Academic background
- Education: Victoria University of Manchester (BA); University of Cambridge (PhD)

Academic work
- Discipline: Comparative literature
- Institutions: Queen's University Belfast; Victoria University of Manchester; University of Oregon; University of Texas at Dallas; University of North Carolina at Chapel Hill

Lilian Renée Furst (30 June 1931 – 11 September 2009) was a British-American literary scholar. A refugee from Nazi Germany's Anschluss, she studied in Europe and later headed Queen's University Belfast's comparative literary studies department, before becoming the Marcel Bataillon Professor of Comparative Literature at the University of North Carolina at Chapel Hill. A 1982 Guggenheim Fellow, she wrote or edited more than a dozen books, as well as a memoir about her youth.

== Biography ==
Lilian Renée Furst, a Jew, was born on 30 June 1931 in Vienna. Her parents Desider Fürst and Sári Fürst-Neufeld were dental surgeons, and were Hungarian and Polish respectively. After the Nazis annexed Austria in 1938, the family fled to Manchester in the United Kingdom. Many of their relatives were murdered in the Holocaust, including two paternal aunts (one in the Auschwitz concentration camp) and several cousins.

In addition to brief studies at the University of Paris and University of Zurich, Furst obtained a BA with honours (1952) in French and German at the Victoria University of Manchester, as well as a PhD in German (1957) at the University of Cambridge. She joined Queen's University Belfast in 1955, later moving from lecturer to associate professor of German. In 1966, she returned to VUM as an associate professor of comparative literature, also spending about four years as their head of comparative literary studies.

Realizing that the United States had a higher regard for the field, Furst moved out of Britain into the new country. She worked at the University of Oregon (1972-1975) as a professor of Romance languages, as well as director of the comparative literature graduate program. After a brief stint at the University of Texas at Dallas as a professor of comparative literature (1975), she finally started teaching at the University of North Carolina at Chapel Hill in 1986, doing so until 2005. She was the Kenan Distinguished Professor in the Humanities at the College of William & Mary, as well as Marcel Bataillon Professor of Comparative Literature at UNC.

Furst wrote or edited more than a dozen books, with many of them translated into several languages as Greek, Japanese, Korean, and Malay. She chaired the Modern Language Association's 19th-century comparative literature section in 1979. In 1982, she was awarded a Guggenheim Fellowship "for a study of irony in the 18th and 19th century European narrative". She also served as chair of the Department of Comparative Literature at UNC starting in 1984. In 2006, the University of Nebraska–Lincoln awarded her an honorary doctorate of letters. She was a 1974-1975 American Council of Learned Societies fellow and a 1982-1983 Martha Sutton Weeks Fellow, and she had residencies at the National Humanities Center and the Stanford Humanities Center.

In addition to her literature scholarship, Furst wrote Home Is Somewhere Else (1994), her memoir about her experiences of fleeing the Nazi regime. She once said: "I am aware each time I teach my course on the literary portrayal of adolescence in twentieth century literature, just how close I came to the fate of Anne Frank." She also wrote another manuscript which had not been published prior to her death; it is held within her papers at the Girton College Archives, and a portion was published in the journal Religions.

Furst died from heart disease on 11 September 2009, in her Chapel Hill, North Carolina, home, aged 78. During her retirement, she had suffered from macular degeneration and retinal detachment, which had caused her to be unable to read, but received home care (including from close friends) during her last moments of her life.

== Works ==
- Romanticism (1969) (Note: Reviews of this book:)
- Romanticism in Perspective (1970) (Note: Reviews of this book:)
- Counterparts: The Dynamics of Franco-German Literary Relationships, 1770-1895 (1977) (Note: Reviews of this book:)
- The Contours of European Romanticism (1979) (Note: Reviews of this book:)
- European Romanticism: Self-Definition (1980, ed.) (Note: Reviews of this book:)
- Fictions of Romantic Irony (1984) (Note: Reviews of this book:)
- L'Assommoir: A Working Woman's Life (1990) (Note: Reviews of this book:)
- Disorderly Eaters: Text in Self-Empowerment (1992; ed. with Peter W. Graham)
- Realism (1992, ed.) (Note: Reviews of this book:)
- Through the Lens of the Reader: Explorations of European Narrative (1992) (Note: Reviews of this book:)
- Women Healers and Physicians: Climbing a Long Hill (1997; ed.) (Note: Reviews of this book:)
- All Is True: The Claims and Strategies of Realist Fiction (1995) (Note: Reviews of this book:)
- Between Doctors and Patients: The Changing Balance of Power (1998) (Note: Reviews of this book:)
- Medical Progress and Social Reality: A Reader in Nineteenth-Century Medicine and Literature (2000, ed.) (Note: Reviews of this book:)
- Before Freud: Hysteria and Hypothesis in Later Nineteenth-Century Psychiatric Cases (2005) (Note: Reviews of this book:)
