= Chajim Fürst =

Chajim Fürst, a.k.a. Heinrich Chajim Fürst (born c. 1580; died 1653 in Hamburg-Altona, Germany) was a merchant and court agent as well as an elder of the Jewish community of Hamburg. According to contemporary sources, Heinrich Chajim Fürst was also the richest Jew in Hamburg at the time.
