= Crown rabbi =

Crown rabbi may refer to:

- Crown rabbi (Iberia), a high administrative post in Castile, Aragon, Navarre, or Portugal in the Middle Ages
- Crown rabbi (Russia), an administrative position in the Russian Empire
