= Płaczek =

- Pronunciation: ['plaʈ͡ʂek] (Placzek) or ['pu̯aʈ͡ʂek] (Płaczek)

Origin
- Language: Polish
- Meaning: weeper, mourner, sniveller
- Region of origin: Poland

Other names
- Variant form: Plaček

Płaczek (['pu̯aʈ͡ʂek]) is a Polish surname. It is derived from the noun płacz, "crying". Notable people with the surname Płaczek or Placzek include:

- Abraham Placzek (1799–1884), Moravian rabbi
- Adrianna Płaczek (born 1993), Polish handball player
- Baruch Placzek (1834–1922), Moravian rabbi and writer
- George Placzek (1905–1955), Czech physicist
- Joyce Placzek (1901–1953), English writer under name of Jan Struther
- Marysia Placzek (born 1960), British neuroscientist
- Otto Placzek (1884–1968), German sculptor
- Siegfried Placzek (1866–1946), German neurologist and psychiatrist
- Grzegorz Płaczek (born 1978), Polish politician

== See also ==
- Plaček, Czech surname of the same origin
- Placek
- Placzek transient, a concept in nuclear engineering
