= Hranické Loučky =

Neighborhood of Hustopeče nad Bečvou, Czech Republic

- Neighborhood
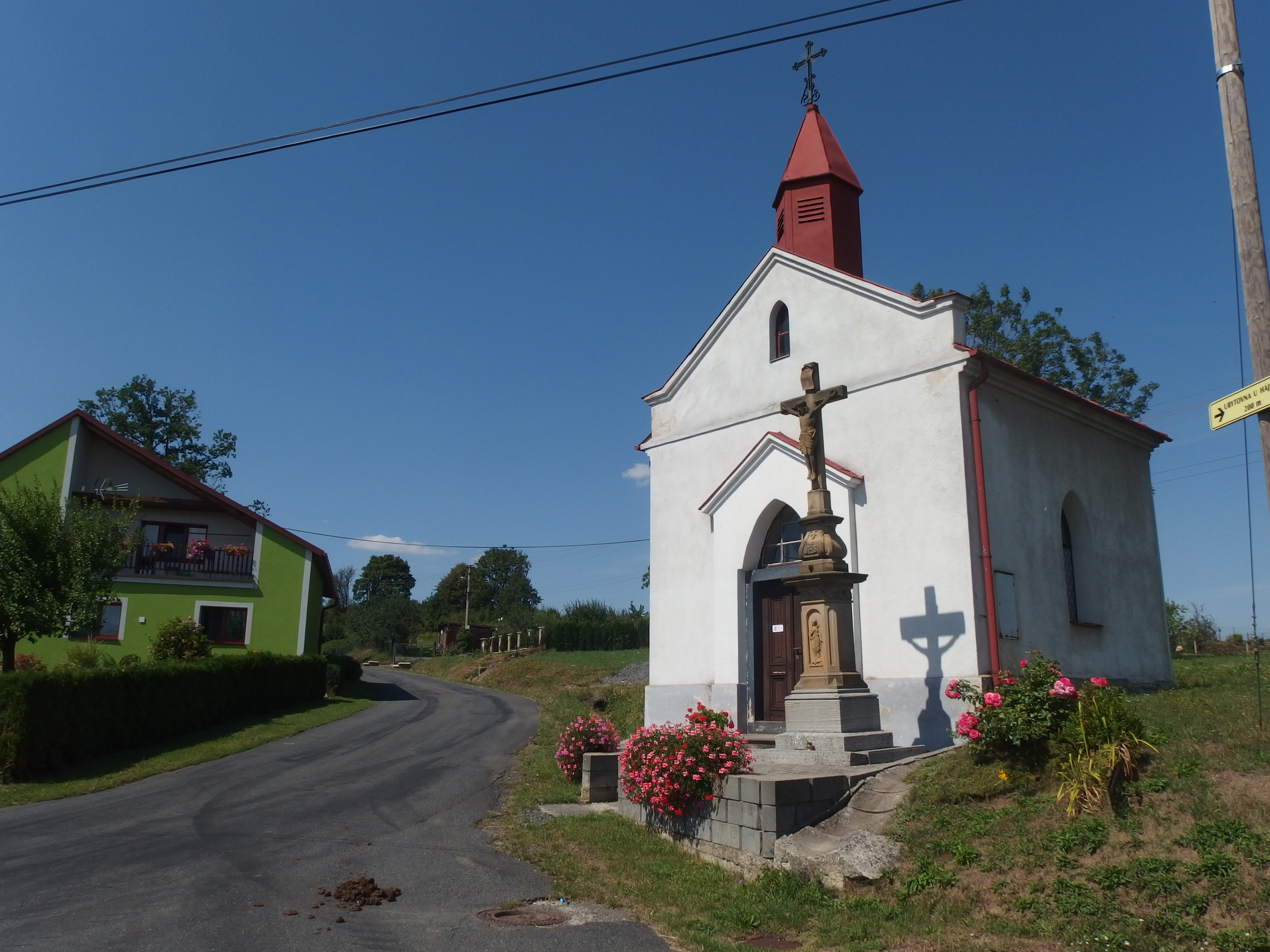
- Interactive map of Hranické Loučky
- Coordinates: 49.548889°N 17.842778°E
- Kraj: Olomouc
- Přerov: Okres
- Hustopeče nad Bečvou: Town

Hranické Loučky, which was called Kozí Loučky (German: Litschel) until 1964, is a neighborhood of Hustopeče nad Bečvou in the Czech Republic. It is nine kilometers to the east of Hranice and belongs to the Okres Přerov.

== Geography ==
Hranické Loučky is located on an offshoot of the Podbeskydská pahorkatina (Vorbeskiden Hills) in the Moravian Gate. The town is in the European watershed; to the north is the ridge of the Luha which is a tributary of the Oder, to the south is the Bečva which is a tributary of the Donau. The river valley of the Bach Loučský lies to the east. The Bušlín (333 m) can be found to southeast and the Na Strážnici (353 m) lies in the southwest.

Its neighboring locations are Polom to the north, Heřmanice u Polomi and Starojická Lhota to the northeast, Vysoká and Palačov in the east, Poruba and Hustopeče nad Bečvou in the southeast, Milotice nad Bečvou in the south, Kamenec (Zámrsky), Kačena, Nové Sady, Ústí and Černotín in the southwest, Špičky in the west, as well as Kunčice und Bělotín in the northwest.

== History ==
The village was founded together with Hranice in the period between the 12th and 13th centuries as a part of the colonization led by the Monk Jurik from the Abtei Rajhrad in the service of Duke Frederick. The first alleged appearance of Luczki in 1201 was actually a falsification from the 14th century. The town's name was derived from the meadows where goats were herded. After the town had fallen to the Golden Horde in 1241, the Bishop of Oloumoc, Bruno von Schauenburg, recolonized the area and placed it under the jurisdiction of the bishopric of Kamenec. After later changes of ownership, Wilhelm II. von Pernstein took control of the town in 1499 and named it Lúčka and added it to the estate of Hranice. In 1517 the town was known as Kozí Lúčka from 1539 as Kozí Loučka, from 1630 as Kozí Loučky, from 1654 as Liczel (or Litzel) from 1672 as Litschel, 1684 as Lietschl, 1751 as Litschl, 1771 as Luczkium and in 1828 as Lutschel.

The village had 14 residents in 1569. The register books were located in Valašské Meziříčísince 1683, in Hustopeče nad Bečvou since 1683 and were relocated to Špičky in 1771. In 1830, the village contained 14 village houses with a total of 176 residents. Until the middle of the 19th century Litschel was subject to the Moravian Weisskirchen.

After the repeal of the patrimonial subjugation in 1850, Litschel / Kozíloučky became a neighborhood of the Hermitz / Heřmanice area in the Bezirkshauptmannschaft Moravian Weisskirchen. The village lay on the German-Czech language border. Litschel / Kozíloučky was then its own area in 1868. In 1880 the village consisted of 27 houses which contained 161 residents. Out of this total, there were 141 Germans about 20 Czechs. The location of the school was next to Hermitz and a branch office of the Hermitzer school in Litschel opened in 1909. The German school closed in 1919 but re-opened in 1922 as a school for German children from Litschel and Hermitz. The Czech children were educated in Hermitz. In 1930, there were 117 Germans and 46 Czechs living in Litschel. Until this time, an old windmill stood outside of the villages. 1931 saw the completed of a road to Milotice. As a result of the Munich Agreement, the village was annexed by the German Empire and was assigned to the Landkreis Neu Titschein.

After the end of World War II, Kozí Loučky was returned to Czechoslovakia and assigned to the Okres Hranice once again. The German residents were expelled. After the repeal of the Okres Hranice in 1960, Kozí Loučky was assigned to Okres Přerov. In 1964, the village was incorporated into Špičky and was also renamed Hranické Loučky at this time. Since 1983, Hranické Loučky has been a neighborhood of Hustopeče nad Bečvou. In 1991, Hranické Loučky has 69 residents and according to the 2001 census it contained 15 residential houses with a total of 73 residents.

== Landmarks ==
- Chapel of the Schmerzen Maria, built in 1857 to replace a wooden clock tower from 1777. This chapel was renovated in 1901.
