= Tatra 607 Monopost =

Racing car

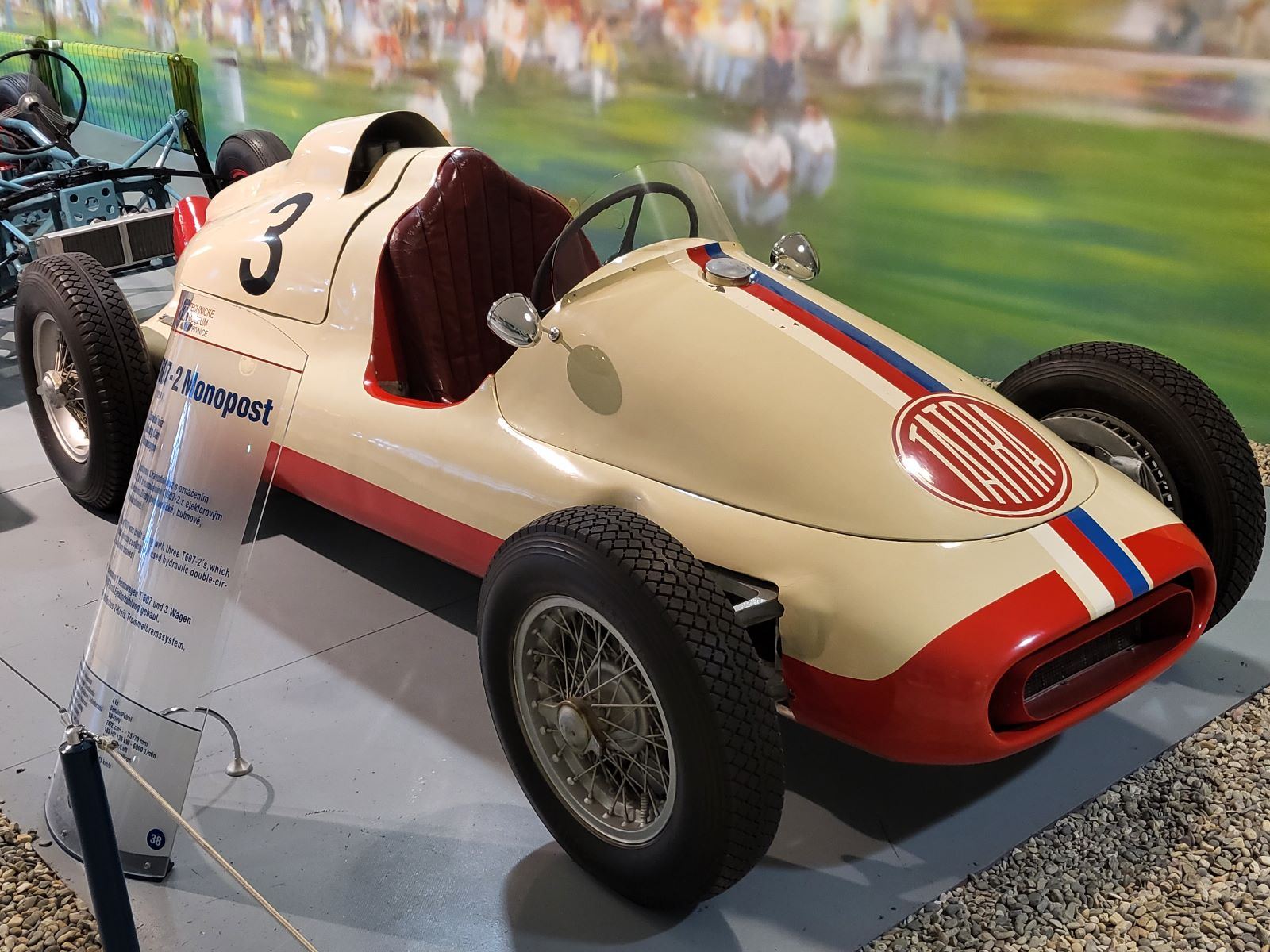
- Tatra 607-2 Monopost

Overview
- Manufacturer: Tatra (company) Kopřivnice
- Production: 1950–1958
- Assembly: Kopřivnice

Body and chassis
- Class: F2
- Body style: single-seat, streamlined

Powertrain
- Engine: V8, air-cooled
- Transmission: mechanical

Dimensions
- Length: 3,460 mm (136.2 in)
- Width: 1,475 mm (58.1 in)
- Height: 980 mm (38.6 in)

The Tatra 607 Monopost single-seater racing car was produced in the years 1950–1958 in the Czechoslovak Republic by the Tatra Kopřivnice car factory. It was built with Rear mid-engine, rear-wheel-drive layout in accordance with the 2-liter engine size rules for building Formula 2 racing cars. For the 1954 Formula One season, new rules with 2500cc engines were introduced, and the 607-2 was made to these F1 rules.

A total of five Tatra 607 single-seaters were created, which won victories at domestic circuit races in the 1950s.

== Origin and development ==
After successfully participating in the Czechoslovak Grand Prix in 1949 with the sports car Tatra 602 Tatraplan Sport (based on the chassis of Tatra 600 limousine), it was decided to build a thoroughbred racing car in Kopřivnice. The T607 was presented for the first time on 17 September 1950 at a circuit in Ostrava, where Bruno Sojka drove it for two promotional rounds. The official launch of the new car took place a week later, on 24 September 1950 at the Masaryk Circuit.

== Technical description ==
The original T607 from 1950 had an air-cooled V8 engine with a displacement of 1985 cm³ (bore 72 / stroke 61 mm) and corresponded to the Formula 2 category of up to 2000 cm³. At a compression ratio of 12.8, the engine reached a torque of 21 kpm (206 Nm)/4900 rpm. Cooling air was supplied to the engine by two axial fans, driven by V-belts from pulleys on the crankshaft. In 1953, a 2,545 cm³ (75/72 mm) version was created, as in the upcoming Tatra 603F, later reduced under 2500cc, also in the road car. For these versions of the engine, the manufacturer experimentally installed ejector cooling, using the exhaust gases to suck hot air out of the engine cover. Later versions of the engines were also fitted with four twin Weber 40 DCL carburettors.

The fuel tank volume increased from the original 95l (T607) to 105l (T 607-2).

=== Body and chassis ===
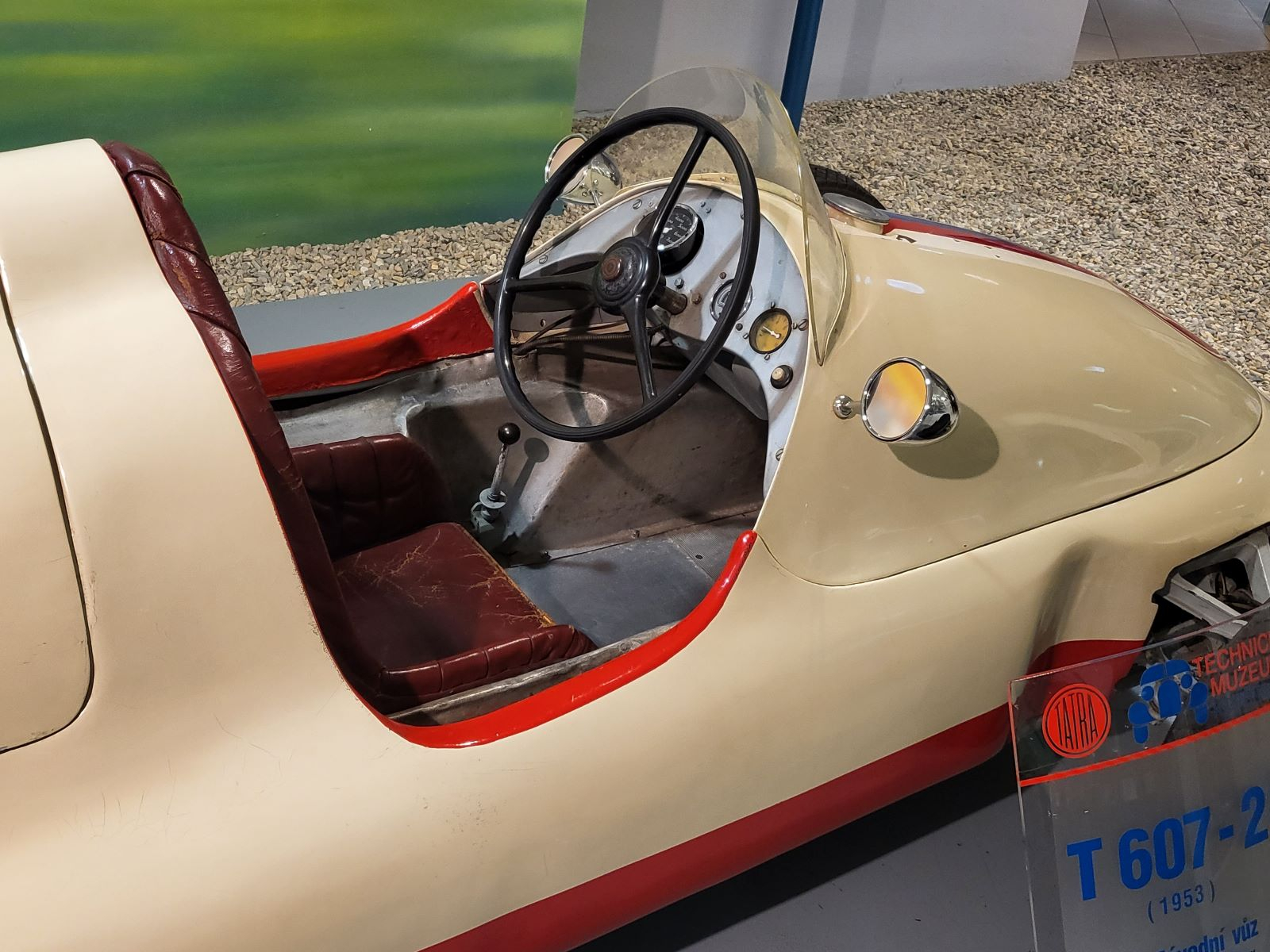
Tatra 607-2, cockpit

The streamlined, cigar-shaped body with open wheels had a lattice frame, welded from thin-walled aircraft tubes. The front wheels were mounted on wishbones, the rear wheels on pendulum angle half-axles. The 15" wire center-nut wheels were fitted with 5.50 × 15" (140 mm × 15") front and 6.50 × 15" (165 mm × 15") tires at the rear. All wheels were thus independently suspended, sprung with longitudinal torsion bars and telescopic hydraulic shock absorbers.

The steering was mechanical, rack-and-pinion, derived from the T600 car. The brakes on all wheels were drum, liquid, dual-circuit, with hydraulic pressure equalization. All wheels on the T607 had heavily ribbed steel drums, while the T607-2 had wider aluminium alloy drums with massive axial vanes and cast iron inserts. The wheelbase of the T607 was 2250 mm, the wheelbase of the T607-2 was extended to 2350 mm.

== Racing pedigree ==
=== Records ===
On 4 October 1953, Adolf Veřmiřovský reached the speed of 197.7 km/h in the Tatra 607, on the Strakonicka expressway which runs below Prague-Barrandov along the Vltava. Tatra did not accept this result, claiming that the car could reach faster speeds, if the length of the run was larger. The second attempt was on 16 October 1953 on the wide and straight Valašské Meziříčí – Hranice road, today's Silnice I/35 road. The almost eight-kilometer straight section in a gentle descent (westbound, at Hustopeče nad Bečvou) gave the driver more room for accelerating and braking. A new national speed record of 207.972 km/h was reached.

=== Motorsport ===
At the 1950 Grand Prix of Czechoslovakia which was held at the old Masaryk Circuit, the racing car came 2nd (behind Maserati but ahead of Škoda) in the overall ranking, and achieved the fastest lap time of the race of 9:38.7 min at an average speed of 109.5 km/h.

Racing driver Jaroslav Pavelka won the championship race on the circuit in Ostrava in 1951, and thus began his long series of winning races with the T607. In 1952, Pavelka won races in Šternberk, Piešťany and again in Ostrava. On the Ecce Homo hill climb in Šternberk, Pavelka won a total of 3 times, with the single-seater T607 in July 1952 and with the single-seater T607-2 in 1953–1954.

Pavelka scored a significant victory on 28 September 1952 in an international race at the Masaryk Circuit (8 laps/142.4 km), where he beat the favorite Edgar Barth who drove a BMW 2000cc, based on the pre-war BMW 328, made by East German Eisenacher Motorenwerk (EMW) that soon had to stop using the BMW name.
