= Placek =

Placek may be either a Polish language surname or a rendering of the Czech-language surname Plaček without diacritics.

Surnames Placek or Plaček (Czech feminine: Plačková) may refer to:

- Abraham Plaček (1799–1884), Moravian rabbi
- Adam Placek, founder and CEO of Polish company Oknoplast
- Alan Placek, American soccer player
- Baruch Jakob Plaček (1834–1922), Moravian rabbi and writer
- Jan Plaček ( 1894 – 1957), Czechoslovak footballer
- Lenka Plačková, Czech comic actress and musician, member of Ivan Mládek's Banjo Band
- Vladimír Plaček (1965–2018), Czech politician and physician
- Wes Placek, founder of Artists Space Gallery, Melbourne, Australia

== See also ==
- Placek, a character from The Two Who Stole the Moon
- Placzek
