= Wähe =

Swiss and Alemannic type of tart

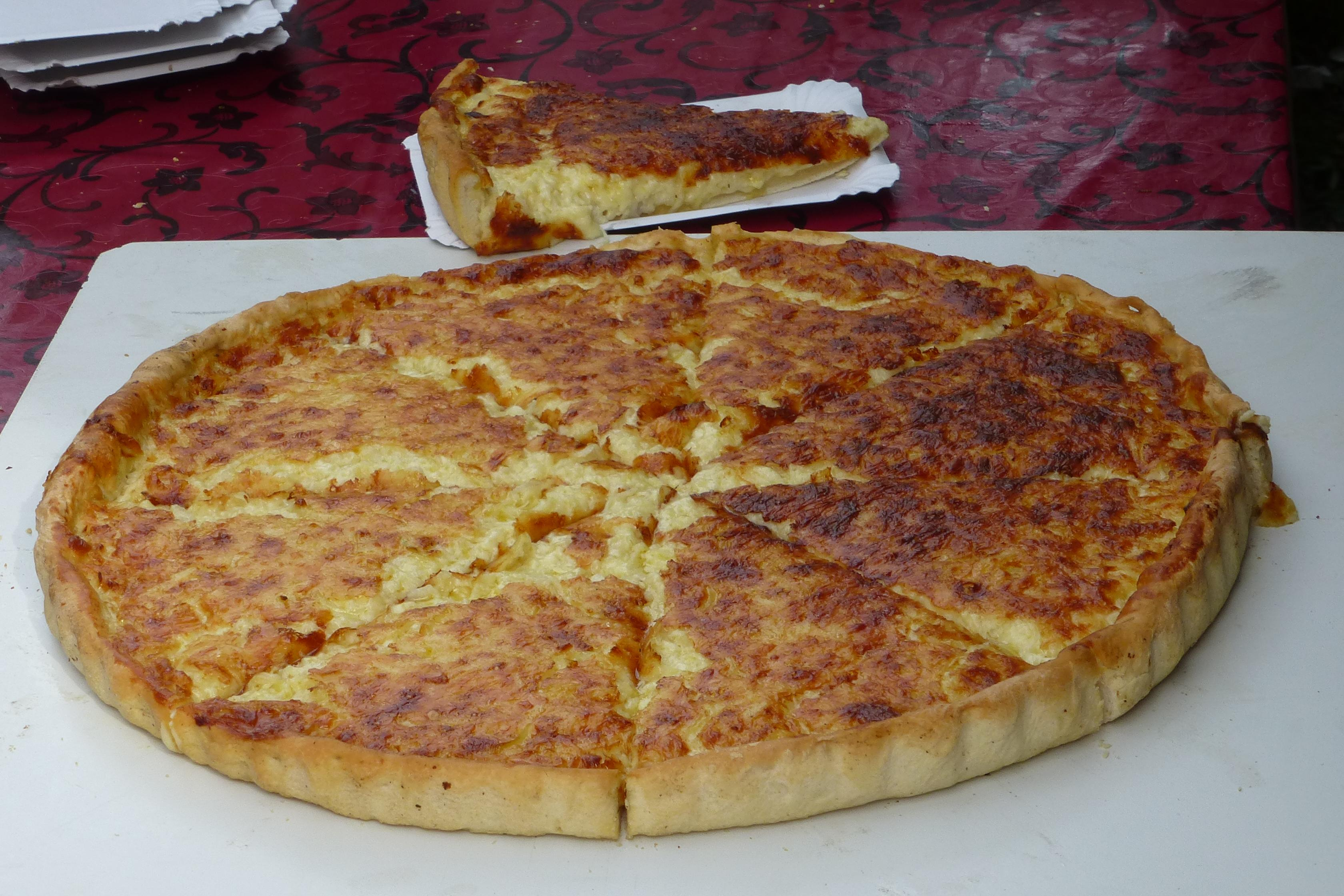
- Cheese wähe
- Type: Tart
- Place of origin: Switzerland, Germany
- Associated cuisine: Swiss and German cuisine
- Main ingredients: Pastry casing, custard
- Ingredients generally used: Fruit, vegetables or cheese
- Similar dishes: Quiche, tart

Wähe (which derives from the dialect in the regions of Basel, Zurich, Baden and Alsace) is a baked dish typical of Swiss and Alemannic (German) cuisine. A wähe consists of a casing (typically made of shortcrust pastry, but sometimes yeast dough or puff pastry) and a topping of a custard enveloping either fruit, vegetables or cheese. The custard and fruits or vegetables are baked together. The preparation is thus very similar to that of the French quiche or tarte.

== History ==
The wähe is likely to have originated in central Switzerland. The first documented mention of the term "wäye" dates back to 1556 when it was described as a bun or cake in a lexicon from the Zurich area. The wähe was first created in home baking and, according to Albert Spycher, it was made with the dough leftovers from bread baking. The scraps of bread dough were rolled out into round flat cakes, the edges of which had to be raised and pressed together to prevent the topping from leaking out. They were topped with all those ingredients that were readily available at home. Since both fruits and vegetables were suitable ingredients, it is rather difficult to separate the story of the savoury wähe from the sweet version.

However, the wähe did not remain just poor man's food, it also became very popular with the middle class. The recipe for an "apple dünne" can be found in Das Kochbuch der Catharina Fehr 1824, which was widespread among the bourgeoisie. According to this recipe you need butter pastry, sliced apples, and a sauce made of flour, wine, sugar and raisins. Since the 19th century the wähe has also been prepared in industrial bakeries.

Originally, the wähe was a food eaten during Lent in the Catholic parts of Switzerland, particularly in the east. On the other hand, it was a festive dish in the Protestant areas, above all in the west. In some regions (Freiburg and Waadtland) wähe was usually eaten on Friday, when meat was not allowed. Even today, many bakeries offer wähe only on Friday because of this tradition. In the mountain regions, wähe has been known only since the early 20th century, probably because ovens were very rare there. In the alpine regions, given the prevailing livestock and milk production, wähe was mainly prepared with cheese and cream. The variety with fruit was most common in the fruit-growing areas of rural regions. Today both sweet and savoury wähe are baked in every regions.

== Regional names ==
The following words are used as partial synonyms for wähe. This, however, does not mean that each specific variety is baked according to the same recipe, because many names have a broader meaning that can refer to other kinds of cakes too. For each region there is an individual recipe and dialect name for the wähe.

- Wäje has spread from the northwest of Basel to the southeast and continues to spread from Zürich onwards. The term is also used in Baden in Germany and in the southern part of Elsass. Apart from chueche it is the most widely used term for this way of preparing a wähe. Wäje is an old Swabian-Alemannic word that, according to Albert Spycher, a folklorist from Basel, might come from one of the mittelhochdeutschen words waehe, meaning something artistic; wîhen, meaning something blessed or holy; or waejen, which means the blowing of the wind.
- Around Bern, Freiburg, south of Luzern, south of Schwyz, Unterwalden, Uri, Wallis and Zug the wähe is known as chueche. In other regions chueche can mean sweet baked goods in general or is equivalent to the standard German term for cake. The word chueche dates back to the althochdeutsch word kuohho that is also related to the English word cake.
- A flade is a wähe in the cantons Appenzell Innerrhoden, Appenzell Ausserrhoden, and east of St. Gallen. It has an Indo-Germanic root that means "to expand" and was used from early on as a term for flat baked goods.
- In Schaffhausen, Thurgau and in some parts south of Lake Zurich in the cantons Schwyz and Zürich, a wähe is known as tünne, tünnele or the short form tüle. This regional connection indicates that it was used as such in a larger region. Dünne, dünnele and dünnet are the words on the German side of the Rhine and the Bodensee for wähe. These words are derived from the adjective dünn (thin). Flat cakes were in fact called dunni in Old High German.
- In the canton of Graubünden wähe is called turte. Turte either developed from the Italian word torta, the French word tourte or the Romansh word tuorta. Additionally, wähe is also called pitte, which comes from the rätoromanisch pitta (flat bread cake) and was provisionally used for the at first relatively unknown but similar wähe.

In French speaking Switzerland the cake similar to a wähe is called a tarte, in Italian speaking Switzerland a torta or crostata, in Romansh a tuorta or petta.

== Preparation ==
=== Savoury wähen ===
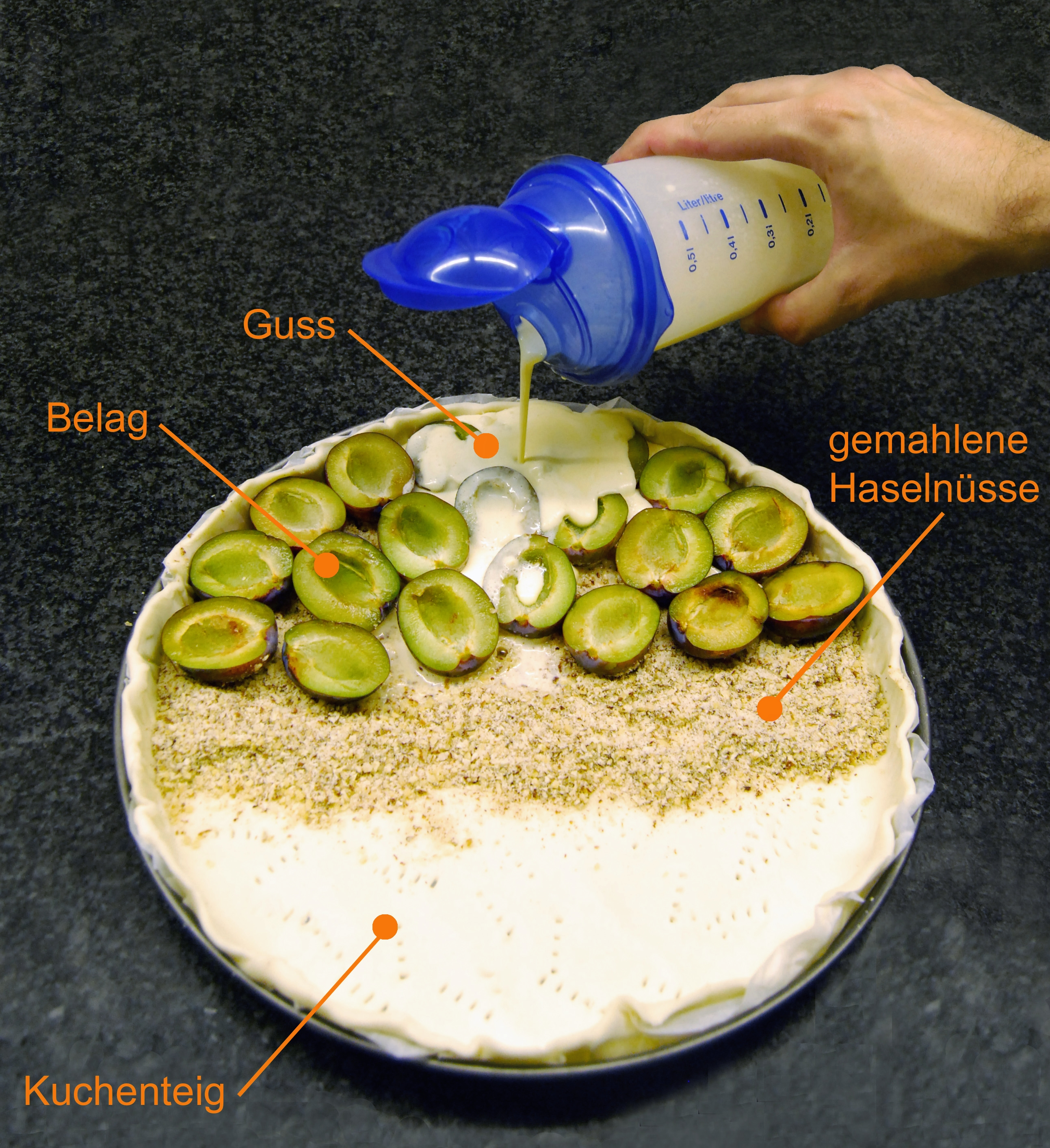
Composition of a wähe

Savoury wähen are coated with onions, cheese and/or bacon. The cheese wähe (also called a cheesy cake) is made with a custard of grated cheese (e.g. Gruyère), cream and eggs.

Vegetable wähen can be made with courgette, spinach, tomatoes or broccoli. Again a custard of grated cheese, cream or milk and eggs is used.

=== Sweet wähen ===
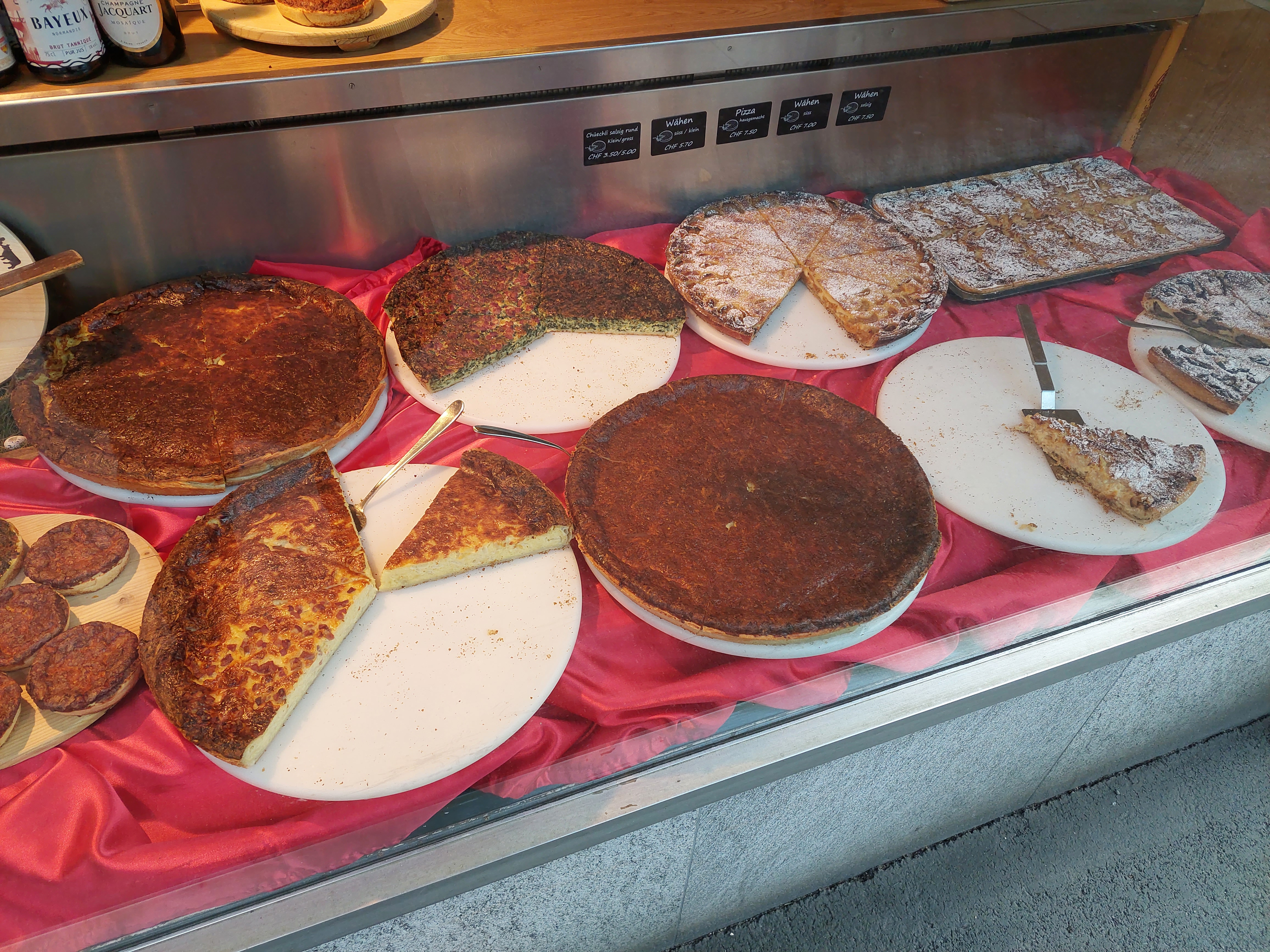
Different kinds of wähe for sale

Typically, sweet wähen are topped with fruit, especially plums, apples, apricots, rhubarb and cherries, etc. – depending on the time of year fresh or frozen. Before the fruit is added, the dough is often covered with a layer of ground nuts. A custard of milk, cream, eggs and sugar is added before the baking of the wähe. In southern Switzerland wähen are often baked without this custard (much like a tart).

Vermicelles, grape or red currant wähen are not coated until or just before the wähe is finished baking.

Another sweet kind of wähe is the nidle-cake, made using a custard of cream (nidle), eggs and sugar.

== Local specialities ==
The Zibelemärit (onion market) in Bern is traditionally accompanied by a Zwiebelkuchen for dinner.

The basler fastenwähe is made with a salty yeast-dough sprinkled with caraway and looks quite like a pretzel. Other than the name these fastenwähen have nearly nothing in common with the usual wähe.

== Similar dishes ==
- Quiche: French name for the same type of baking. To be precise it actually only refers to the quiche Lorraine (also called Lothringer Specktorte) and is today used for all sorts of vegetable quiches making it a synonym for tart.
- Tart: made without sugar or salt and while adding the layer of fruit without often without the custard.
- Placek: Polish yeast-dough or shortcake that has a similar shape.
- Rijstevlaai: Has a similar recipe. In Belgium it is mostly known as a rice rijstevlaai. A mush of dried pears and, depending on the region, additional ingredients are put on the dough.
- Dinnete: Swabian, similar to the recipe of a tarte flambée.
- Cholera: Vallisian variation of a vegetable cake with leeks, potatoes, cheese and apples.
- Oladyi, Russian

== See also ==
- List of cakes
- List of pastries
