= Hustopeče nad Bečvou =

- Market town
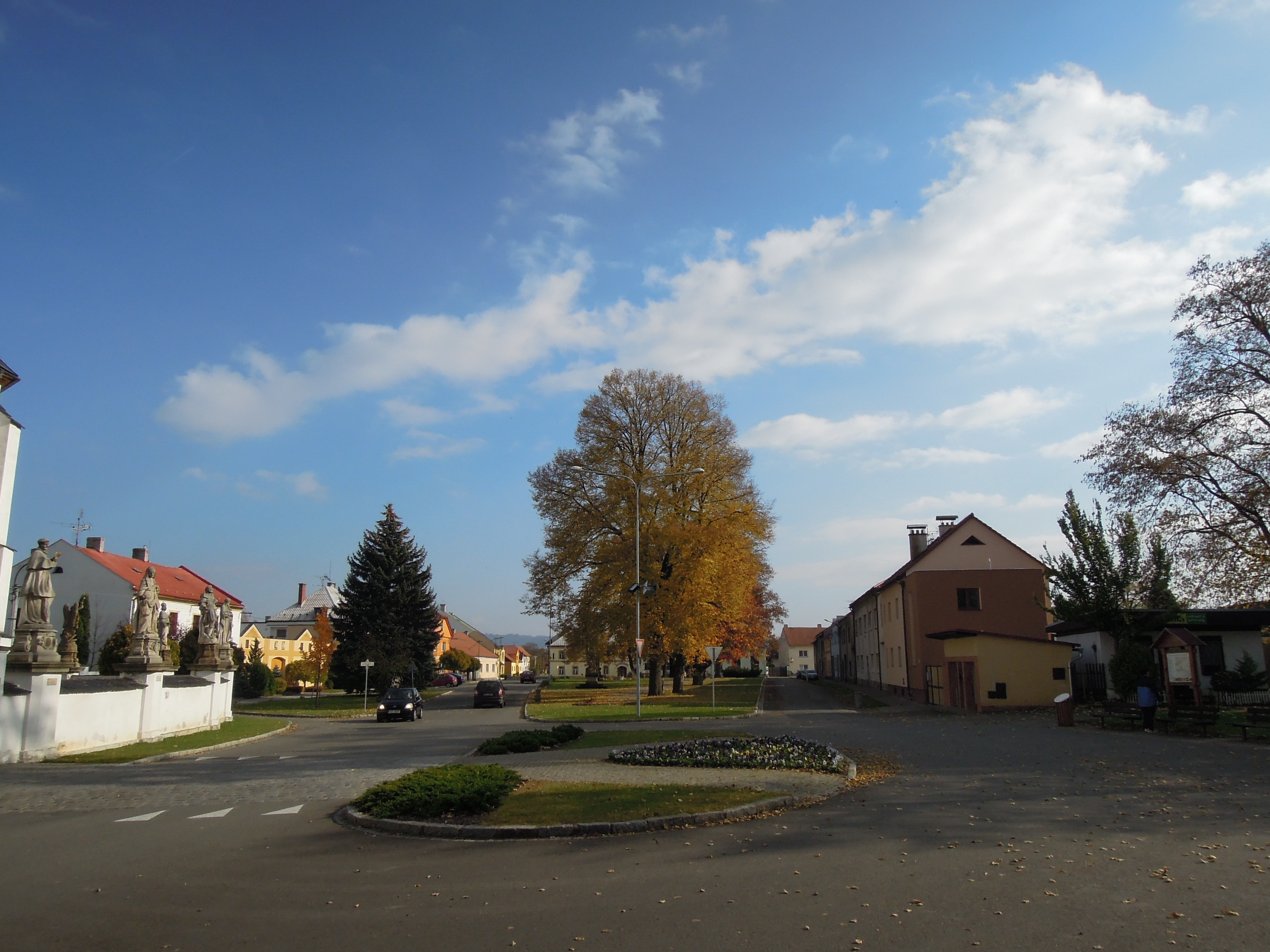
- Centre of Hustopeče nad Bečvou

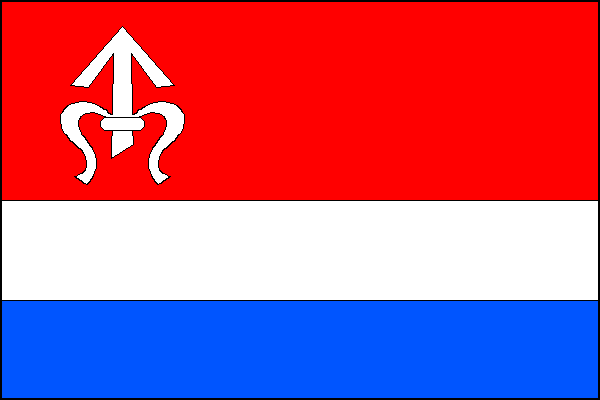
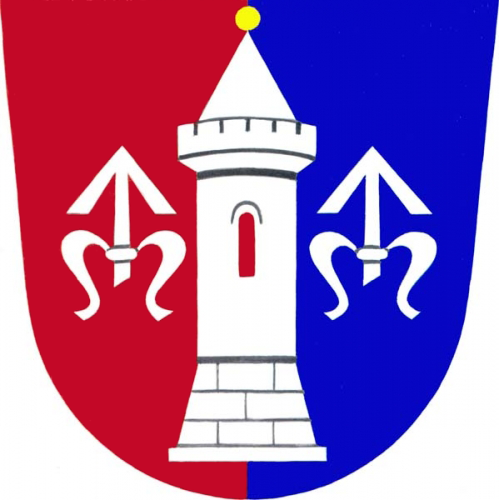
- Flag Coat of arms

- Location in the Czech Republic
- Coordinates: 49°31′50″N 17°52′12″E
- Country: Czech Republic
- Region: Olomouc
- District: Přerov
- First mentioned: 1201

Area
  - Total: 23.91 km^{2} (9.23 sq mi)
- Elevation: 272 m (892 ft)

Population (2026-01-01)
  - Total: 1,705
  - Density: 71.31/km^{2} (184.7/sq mi)
- Time zone: UTC+1 (CET)
  - Summer (DST): UTC+2 (CEST)
- Postal code: 753 66
- Website: www.ihustopece.cz

Hustopeče nad Bečvou (Czech pronunciation: [ˈɦustopɛtʃɛ ˈnad bɛtʃvou]) is a market town in Přerov District in the Olomouc Region of the Czech Republic. It has about 1,700 inhabitants.

== Administrative division ==
Hustopeče nad Bečvou consists of four municipal parts (in brackets population according to the 2021 census):

- Hustopeče nad Bečvou (1,227)
- Hranické Loučky (58)
- Poruba (225)
- Vysoká (185)

== Geography ==
Hustopeče nad Bečvou is located about 30 kilometres (19 mi) east of Přerov and 43 km (27 mi) east of Olomouc. It lies in the Moravian-Silesian Foothills. The highest point is the hill Stráž at 364 m (1,194 ft) above sea level. The market town is situated at the right bank of the Bečva River. The streams Mřenka and Loučský potok flow through the territory of Hustopeče nad Bečvou and then join the Bečva. The municipal territory is rich in fishponds.

== History ==
The first written mention of Hustopeče nad Bečvou is from 1201. The settlement was promoted to a market town in 1397, when it was owned by the Lords of Kravaře. From the end of the 15th century until the middle of the 17th century, the market town was a property of the Zierotin family. In 1693–1763, it was owned by the Podstatský of Prusinovice family.

A serious railway accident occurred on 28 February 2025 near the station in Hustopeče nad Bečvou when a freight train carrying over 1,000 tonnes of benzene derailed. The accident caused 15 of the 17 tankers to catch fire, resulting in a significant chemical blaze.

== Demographics ==
Historical population

Year	Pop.	±%
1869	1,672	—
1880	1,780	+6.5%
1890	1,902	+6.9%
1900	1,817	−4.5%
1910	1,816	−0.1%

Year	Pop.	±%
1921	1,680	−7.5%
1930	1,850	+10.1%
1950	1,684	−9.0%
1961	1,777	+5.5%
1970	1,606	−9.6%

Year	Pop.	±%
1980	1,751	+9.0%
1991	1,749	−0.1%
2001	1,750	+0.1%
2011	1,721	−1.7%
2021	1,695	−1.5%

Source: Censuses

== Transport ==
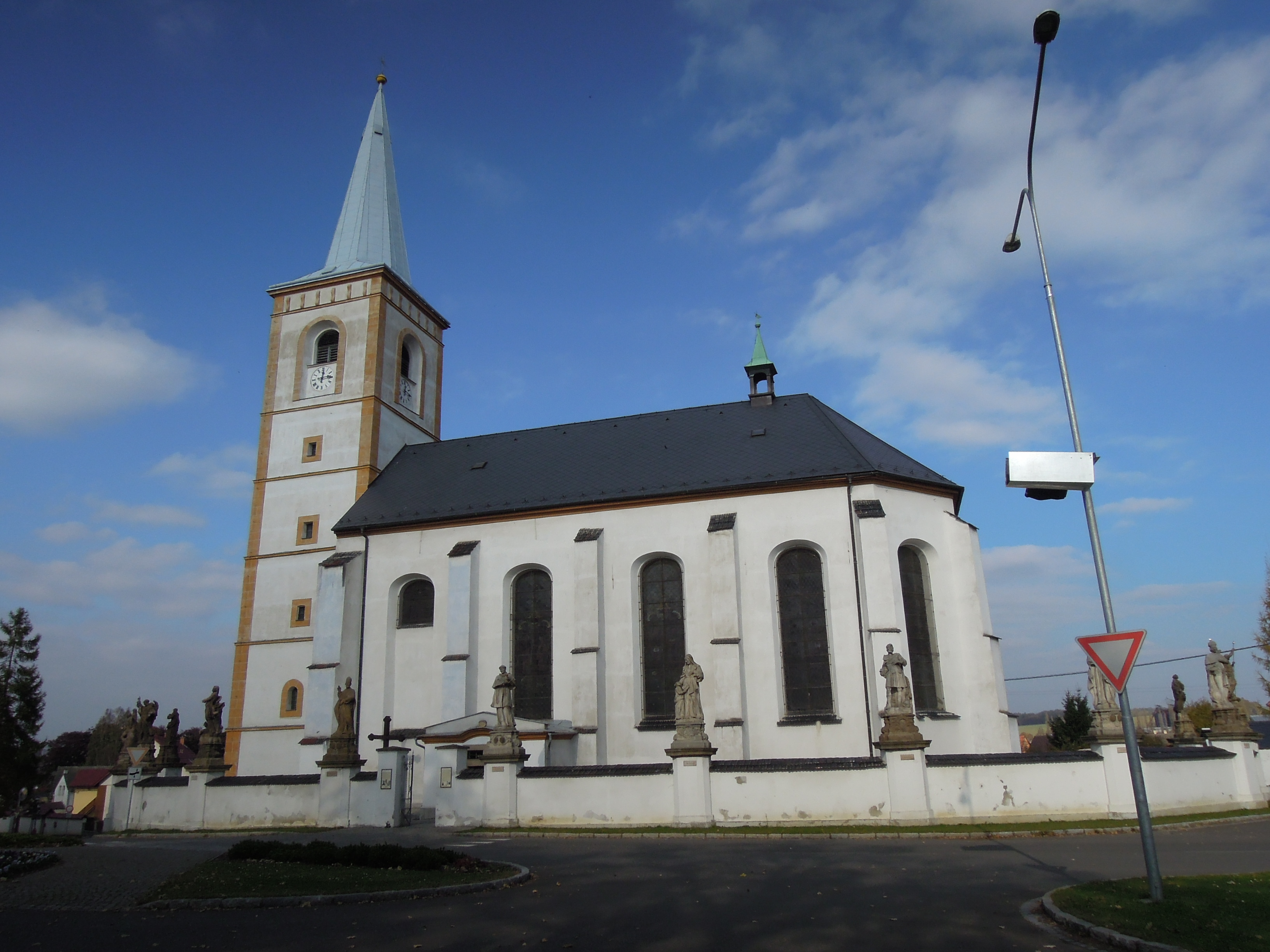
Church of the Exaltation of the Holy Cross

The I/35 road (the section from Hranice to Rožnov pod Radhoštěm, part of the European route E442) runs through the market town. The I/48 road (the unfinished section of the D48 motorway, part of the European route E462), which connects the D1 motorway with Frýdek-Místek, runs along the northern municipal border.

Hustopeče nad Bečvou is located on the railway line Vsetín–Hranice.

== Sights ==
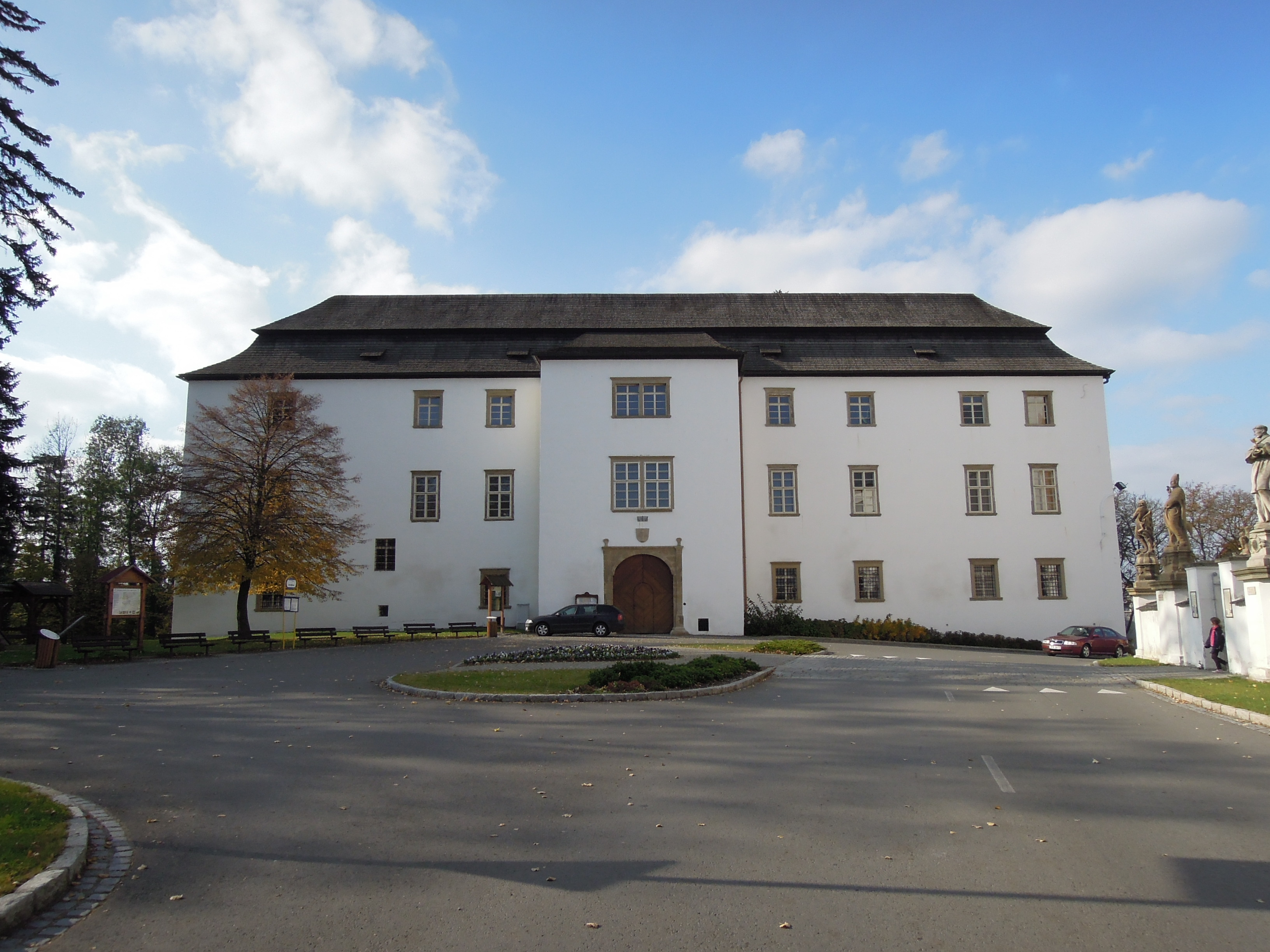
Hustopeče nad Bečvou Castle

The main landmarks of Hustopeče nad Bečvou are the church and castle. The Church of the Exaltation of the Holy Cross was built in the late Gothic and Renaissance styles in 1597–1611. There are 14 valuable statues of saints on the pillars of the enclosure wall. The most valuable work of art in the interior is a wooden pulpit from the mid-18th century.

The Hustopeče nad Bečvou Castle is a Renaissance building, created by reconstruction of an older fortress for the Zierotin family. It was built in 1580–1596. Today it houses a museum. The castle is surrounded by a park.

A notable technical monument is the local Dutch-type windmill. In the 21st century, the building is unused.
