= Špičky =

- Municipality
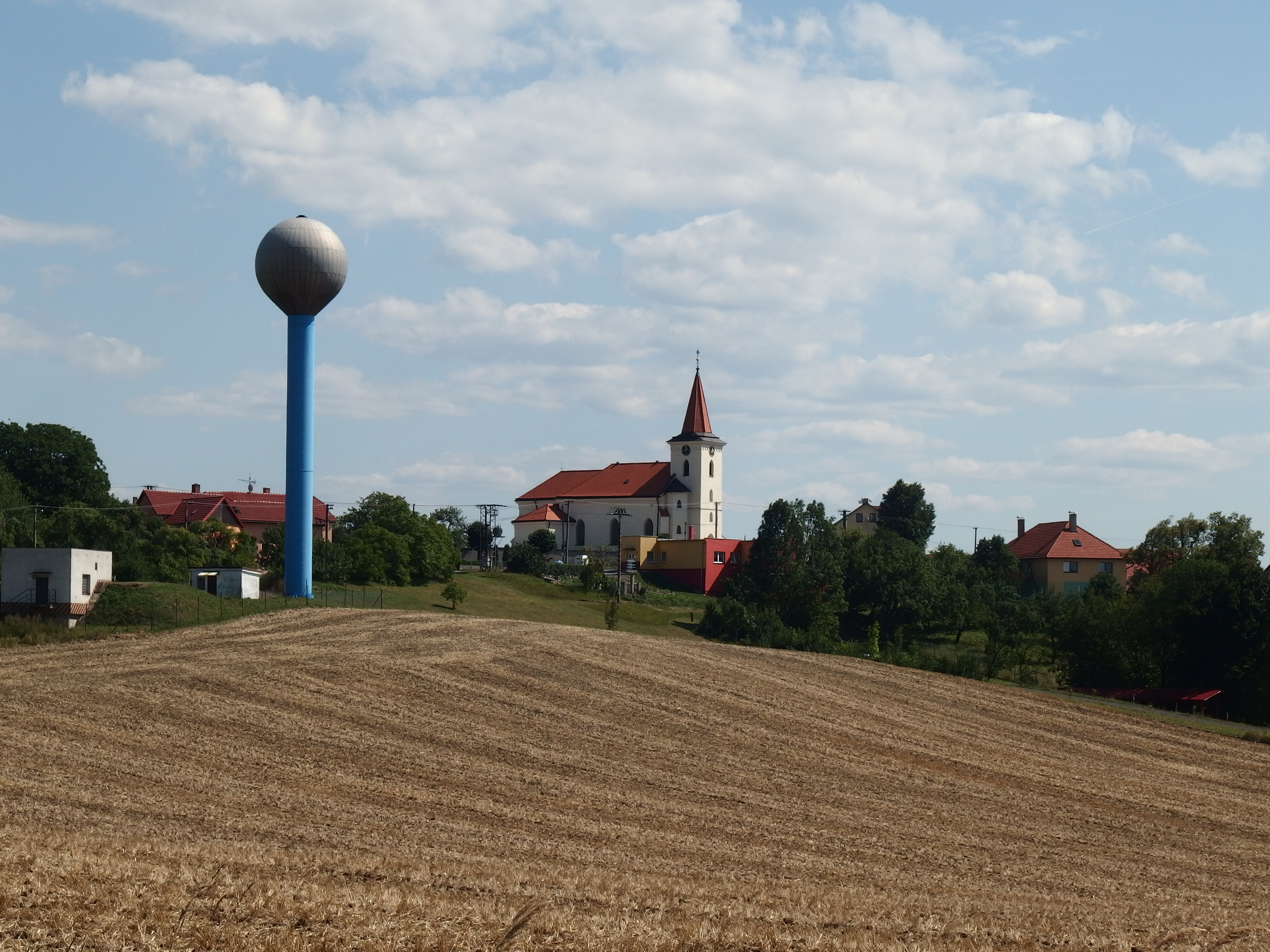
- Water tower and the Church of Saints Simon and Jude

- Flag Coat of arms

- Location in the Czech Republic
- Coordinates: 49°32′53″N 17°48′28″E
- Country: Czech Republic
- Region: Olomouc
- District: Přerov
- First mentioned: 1169

Area
  - Total: 7.03 km^{2} (2.71 sq mi)
- Elevation: 347 m (1,138 ft)

Population (2026-01-01)
  - Total: 264
  - Density: 37.6/km^{2} (97.3/sq mi)
- Time zone: UTC+1 (CET)
  - Summer (DST): UTC+2 (CEST)
- Postal code: 753 66
- Website: www.obec-spicky.eu

Špičky (German: Speitsch) is a municipality and village in Přerov District in the Olomouc Region of the Czech Republic. It has about 300 inhabitants.

Špičky lies approximately 28 kilometres (17 mi) east of Přerov, 41 km (25 mi) east of Olomouc, and 251 km (156 mi) east of Prague.

== Demographics ==
Historical population
Year	Pop.	±%
1869	389	—
1880	354	−9.0%
1890	390	+10.2%
1900	379	−2.8%
1910	384	+1.3%
1921	380	−1.0%
1930	429	+12.9%
1950	328	−23.5%
1961	369	+12.5%
1970	356	−3.5%
1980	327	−8.1%
1991	300	−8.3%
2001	305	+1.7%
2011	275	−9.8%
2021	275	+0.0%
Source: Censuses
