= Wilhelm Wachsmuth =

German historian

Wilhelm Gottfried Wachsmuth
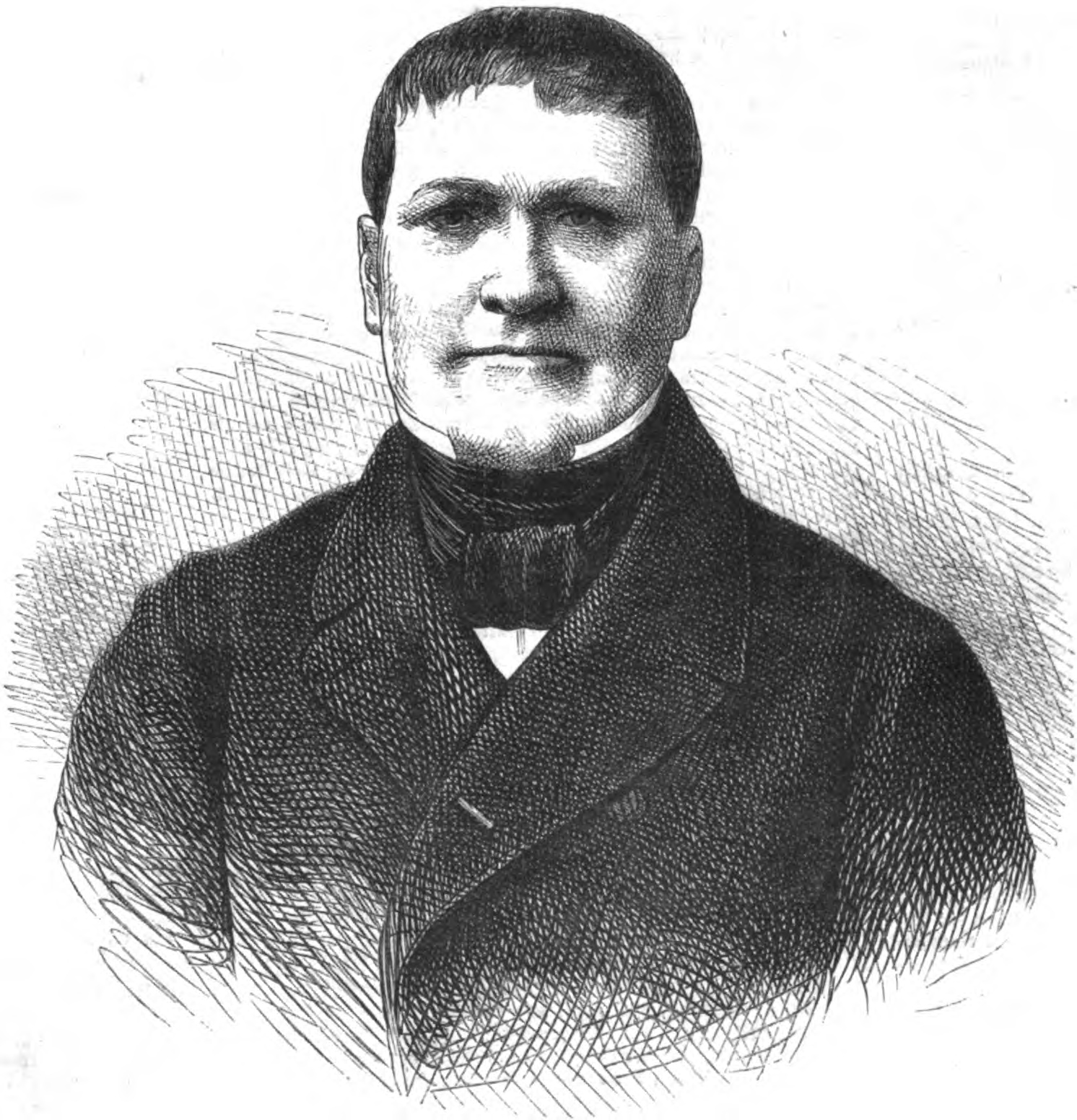
- Born: December 28, 1784
- Died: January 23, 1866 (aged 81)
- Occupation: Non-fiction writer

Academic background
- Education: University of Halle

Academic work
- Discipline: History
- Institutions: University of Halle; University of Kiel staff of Leipzig University

Wilhelm Gottfried Wachsmuth (28 December 1784, Hildesheim, Lower Saxony, Germany – 23 January 1866, Leipzig, Saxony, Germany) was a German historian and academic.

From 1803 to 1806 he studied philology and theology at the University of Halle, and following graduation he worked as a teacher at the monastery school in Magdeburg. In 1815 he became an associate professor of philology at Halle. He was Professor ordinarius of classical philology at the University of Kiel from 1820 to 1826, and Professor ordinarius of history of philosophy at the University of Leipzig from 1826 to 1865. On seven occasions he was dean to the faculty of philosophy at Leipzig and in 1835/36 he served as university rector.

== Selected works ==
- Hellenische Alterthumskunde aus dem Gesichtspunkte des Staates (4 volumes, 1826–30) – Hellenic antiquities from the viewpoint of the state.
- Europäische Sittengeschichte (5 volumes 1831-39) – European social history.
- The historical antiquities of the Greeks (2 volumes, 1837), translated into English by Edmund Woolrych.
- Geschichte Frankreichs im Revolutionszeitalter (4 volumes, 1840–44) – History of France during the revolutionary era.
- Weimars Musenhof in den Jahren 1772 bis 1807 (1844) – The Weimar Musenhof in the years 1772–1807.
- Allgemeine Kulturgeschichte (3 volumes, 1850–52) – General cultural history.
- Geschichte deutscher Nationalität, (3 volumes, 1860–62) – History of German nationality.
