= George Placzek =

Czech physicist (1905–1955)

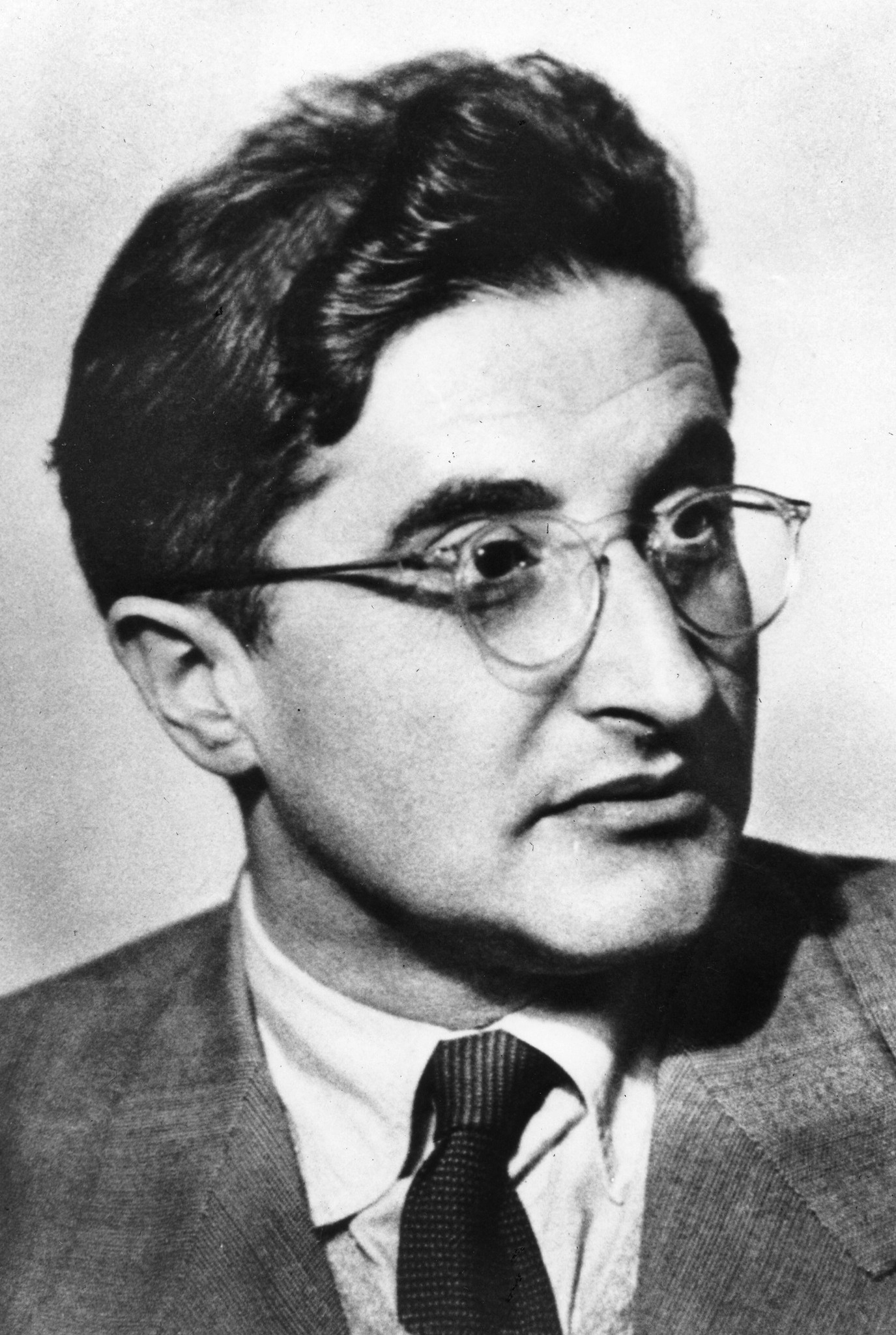
- Born: Georg Placzek; September 26, 1905; Brno, Moravia, Austria-Hungary
- Died: October 9, 1955 (aged 50); Zürich, Switzerland
- Spouse: Els Andriesse

George Placzek (German: Georg Placzek; September 26, 1905 – October 9, 1955) was a Czech physicist. His work involved a fundamental theory of Raman scattering, molecular spectroscopy in gases and liquids, neutron physics and mathematical physics.

Together with Otto Frisch, he suggested a direct experimental proof of nuclear fission. Together with Niels Bohr and others, he was instrumental in clarifying the role of uranium-235 for the possibility of nuclear chain reaction.

== Biography ==
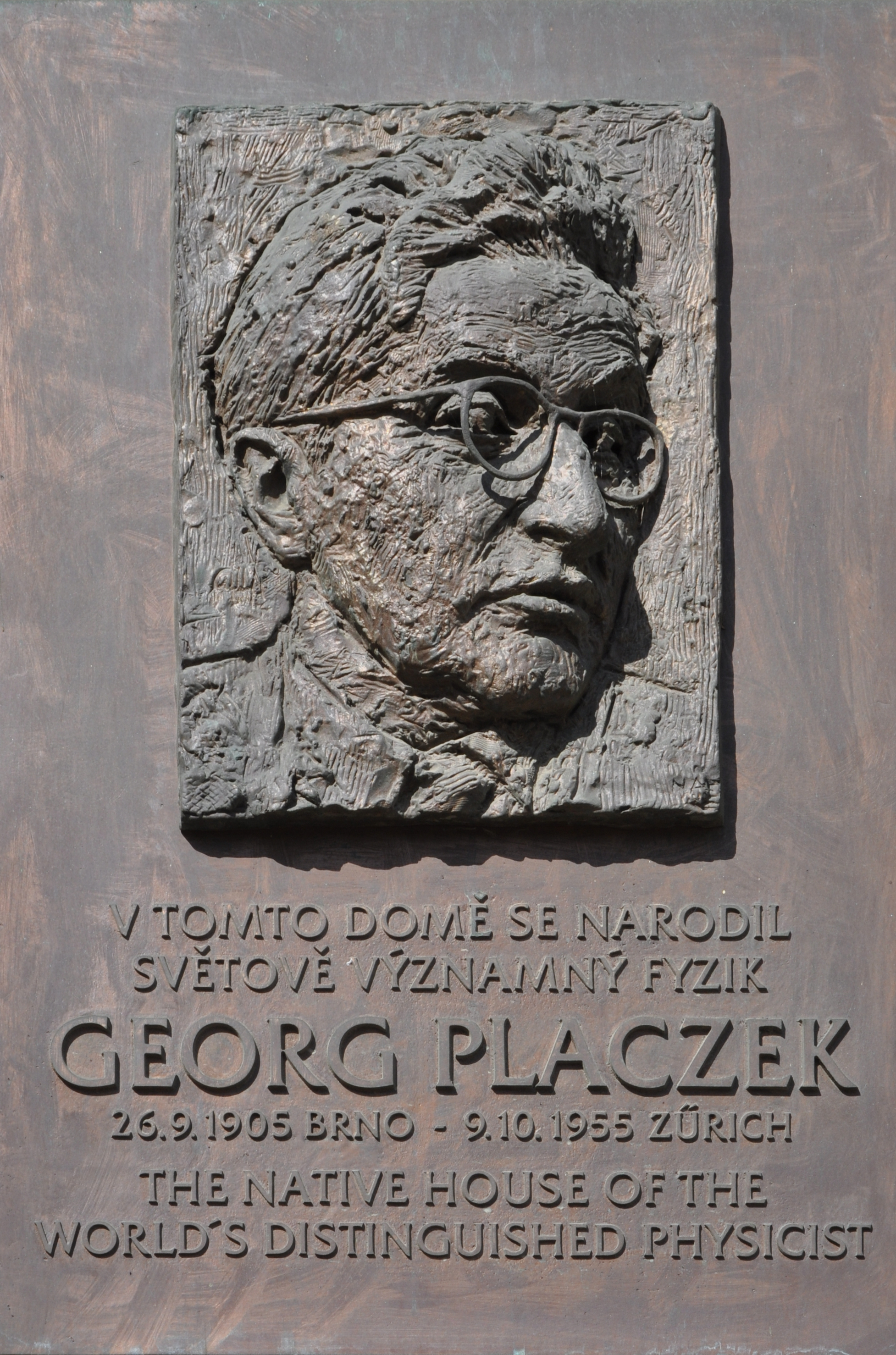
Plaque at Placzek's place of birth in Brno

Placzek was born on September 26, 1905 into a wealthy Jewish family in Brno, Moravia, Austria-Hungary (now the Czech Republic), the grandson of Chief Rabbi Baruch Placzek. He studied physics in Prague and Vienna.

The scope of Placzek's trajectory around the world's physics centres in the 1930s was unique among his colleagues. He worked with Hans Bethe, Edward Teller, Rudolf Peierls, Werner Heisenberg, Victor Weisskopf, Enrico Fermi, Niels Bohr, Lev Landau, Edoardo Amaldi, Emilio Segrè, Otto Frisch, Leon van Hove, and many other prominent physicists of his time. His wife, Els Placzek (née Andriesse) was an ex-wife of physicist Hans von Halban. He lost all his relatives to Holocaust, casting a tragic shadow on his life.

During his stay in Landau's circle in Kharkiv around 1937, Placzek witnessed the brutal reality of Joseph Stalin's regime. His first-hand experience of this influenced the political opinions of his close friends, in particular, fathers of nuclear and thermonuclear bombs, Robert Oppenheimer and Edward Teller.

Later, Placzek was the only Czech with a leading position in the Manhattan Project, where he worked from 1943 till 1946 as a member of the British Mission; first in Canada as the leader of a theoretical division at the Montreal Laboratory and then (since May 1945) in Los Alamos, later replacing his friend Hans Bethe as the leader of the theoretical group. Since 1948, Placzek was a member of the Institute for Advanced Study in Princeton, United States.

Unlike many trailblazers of nuclear physics, George Placzek did not leave his recollections or life story notes. Many new facts about Placzek's life and his family roots emerged in connection with a symposium held in Placzek's memory in 2005. Placzek's premature death in a hotel in Zürich was very likely a suicide influenced by his long-time serious illness.

== See also ==
- Placzek transient
- Landau–Placzek ratio
- Optical theorem
- Depolarization ratio
