= Abraham Placzek =

Moravian rabbi

Landesrabbiner Abraham Placzek
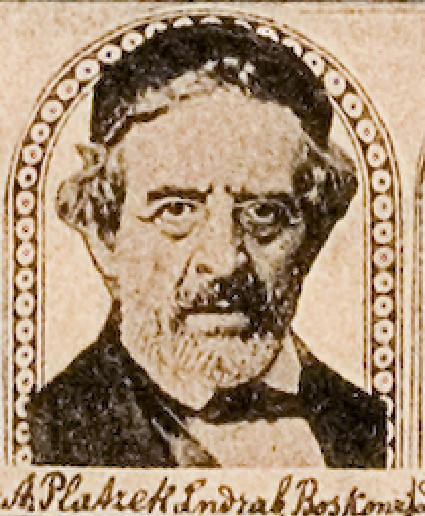

Personal life
- Born: January 1799 Prerau, Moravia, Austria-Hungary
- Died: 10 December 1884 (aged 85) Boskowitz, Moravia, Austria-Hungary
- Buried: Boskovice, Czech Republic

Religious life
- Religion: Judaism
- Denomination: Orthodox

Jewish leader
- Predecessor: Samson Raphael Hirsch
- Successor: Baruch Placzek
- Position: Landesrabbiner of Moravia
- Began: October 1851
- Ended: 10 December 1884

Abraham Placzek (January 1799 – 10 December 1884) was a Moravian rabbi, who served as Landesrabbiner of Moravia from 1851 until his death.

Placzek was born into a Jewish family in Prerau, Austria-Hungary (now Přerov, Czech Republic). In 1827 he became rabbi in his native city, and from 1832 to 1840 he officiated at Weisskirchen. He was then called to Boskowitz, where he served as rabbi until his death.

In October 1851, he succeeded Samson Raphael Hirsch as acting Landesrabbiner of Moravia. In this office he defended the rights of the Jews, and supported Solomon Spitzer efforts against liturgical reform. Placzek was a prominent Talmudic scholar, as well as a successful teacher, and carried on correspondence with eminent rabbis, in whose collections of responsa his name is frequently mentioned.
