= Placzek transient =

Phenomenon in nuclear engineering

The Placzek transient is a phenomenon studied in nuclear engineering named after the physicist Georg Placzek. The Placzek transient occurs when a population of monoenergetic neutrons of energy E elastically scatter within a homogeneous medium. In each collision the neutrons impart a fraction of their energy to the nuclei in the medium, losing up to a maximum of

$$\Delta E_{max} = (1 - \alpha) E$$

$$\alpha = \left(\frac{A-1}{A+1}\right)^2$$

where A is the atomic number of the medium. In nuclear engineering, neutrons that have not yet undergone a collision are called the 1st generation, those that have undergone a single collision are the 2nd generation, those that have undergone two collisions are the 3rd generation, and so on. The neutrons from each generation collectively form the total neutron population within the medium.

The Placzek transient is a discontinuity of the neutron flux, and derivatives of the flux, at integer multiples of $\alpha E$. The transient results from the fact that after the 1st generation, every neutron can have at minimum an energy of $E_{min} = \alpha E$ due to elastic scattering. Those neutrons that have energy less than $E_{min}$ can only consist of neutrons in the 2nd, 3rd, or latter generations. This trend repeats itself at each multiple of $\alpha E$. Thus, the discontinuity in the flux arises from the fact that at each multiple of $\alpha E$ the neutron flux is accumulated from one fewer neutron generation to the left of the discontinuity than to the right.

The Placzek transient can be derived analytically by solving for the neutron flux using a piecewise function solution to a differential equation involving a Heaviside step function in energy intervals of width $(1-\alpha) E$. The transient can also be observed in some special case Monte Carlo neutron transport simulation codes.
