= Baruch Placzek =

Moravian rabbi, author and naturalist

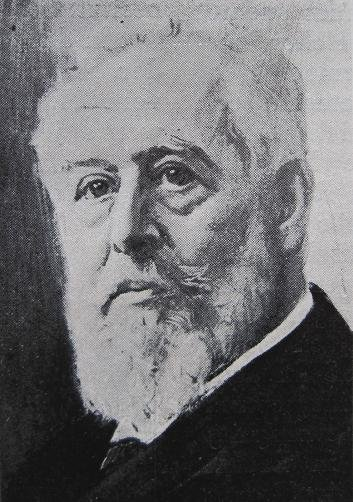
- Born: Baruch Jacob Placzek; 1 October 1834; Weisskirchen, Moravia, Austrian Empire
- Died: 17 September 1922 (aged 87); Moravia, Czechoslovakia
- Burial place: Jewish Cemetery, Brno
- Spouse: Caroline Löw-Beer (died 1914)
- Awards: Order of Franz Joseph

Landesrabbiner of Moravia
- In office 1884–1922
- Preceded by: Abraham Placzek

Academic background
- Education: University of Leipzig
- Thesis: Culturgeschichte der mexikanischen Urvölker, allgemein vergleichend behandelt (1856)
- Doctoral advisor: Wilhelm Wachsmuth

Baruch Jacob Placzek (1 October 1834 – 17 September 1922), also known by the pen name Benno Planek, was a Moravian rabbi, author, poet, orator, and naturalist. He was the last Landesrabbiner of Moravia, which position he held from 1884 until his death. As a writer, he published numerous sermons, speeches, and obituaries, as well as scientific, lyrical, and narrative works.

== Biography ==
=== Early life and education ===
Baruch Jacob Placzek was born in Weisskirchen (now Hranice, Czech Republic) to Anna (née Hofmann) and Abraham Placzek, Landesrabbiner of Moravia. He was taught Talmud by his father in Boskowitz, and educated at the gymnasia of Nikolsburg and Brünn. He then attended the Universities of Vienna and Leipzig, where he completed a PhD under the supervision of Wilhelm Wachsmuth in November 1856, with a dissertation on the cultural history of the indigenous peoples of Mexico.

=== Career ===
Placzek afterwards taught at a Jewish school in Frankfurt, and founded a Bürgerschule in Hamburg in 1858. In 1861 he became Chief Rabbi of Brünn (Brno), a position he held for the next forty-four years. He meanwhile succeeded his father as Landesrabbiner of Moravia in 1884, in which role he was an adherent of moderate religious reform. He promoted the foundation of the Israelitisch-Theologische Lehranstalt seminary in Vienna, for which he served as curator, and was a founder of a number of philanthropic societies.

In part under the pseudonym Benno Planek, he besides published the collections of poetry Im Eruw (1867) and Stimmungsbilder (1872), the novel Der Takif (1895), and other works, several of which were translated into English, French, and Hebrew. As a naturalist, he gave natural science lectures at the Natural History Society of Brünn, and contributed to the journals Kosmos and The Popular Science Monthly. He was a close friend of Gregor Mendel, and corresponded with Charles Darwin, whose theory of evolution he promoted. In one article, Placzek attempted to show that the rabbis in the Talmud put forward ideas akin to Darwinism.

Placzek received an honorary doctorate from the University of Leipzig in 1907. He was a knight of the Order of Franz Joseph, and an honorary member of several political societies.

=== Death and legacy ===
Placzek died in 1922 at the age of 87, predeceased by his wife Caroline and son Oswald. He was survived by his children Sarah, Linda, Ida, Emma, Alfred, and Irma, at least two of whom died in the Theresienstadt Ghetto during the Holocaust. Among his grandchildren were the physicist George Placzek (1905–1955) and the architect and art historian Adolf K. Placzek (1913–2000). His nephew Leo Baeck would go on to serve as President of the World Union for Progressive Judaism.

A bust of Placzek's likeness was unveiled in the entrance hall of the Brno Jewish Community Centre in 2012.

== Selected publications ==
- Culturgeschichte der mexikanischen Urvölker, allgemein vergleichend behandelt (Dissertation). Leipzig: University of Leipzig. 1856.
- Plan der höheren Bürgerschule für israelitische Knaben. Hamburg: M. H. Michael & Co. 1859.
- Im Eruw: Gedichte. Vienna: Herzfeld & Bauer. 1867.
- Ehrmann, Daniel (1868). "Juden und Mexikaner". Das Abendland. 5 (2–14): 9f, 18f, 33f, 42f, 67f, 89–91, 97f, 105f.
- Stimmungsbilder. Gedichte. Vienna: Alfred Hölder. 1872.
- Die Affen bei den Hebräern und andern Völkern des Alterthums. Stuttgart: E. Schweizerbart. 1882.
- "Anthropoid Mythology". The Popular Science Monthly. 21 (5): 655–663. September 1882.
- Der Vogelgesang nach seiner Tendenz und Entwicklung. 1884.
- Nachruf, gehalten an der Bahre des verewigten mährischen Landes-Rabbiners, Hrn. Abraham Placzek, in der Boskowitzer Synagoge, am 24. Kißlew 5645 (12. Dec. 1884). Brünn. 1885.
- "Why Birds Sing". The Popular Science Monthly. 26 (4): 541–546. February 1885.
- Haskara der Lebendigtodten. Predigt, geh. am Schemini-Azareth 5647 (21. Oct. 1886). Brünn: Bernhard Epstein. 1886.
- "Ehre Vater u. Mutter!" Predigt, geh. am Versöhnungstage 5647 [9. Oct. 1886] im Tempel zu Brünn. Brünn. 1886.
- "Zu eng ist mir der Raum!" Predigt. geh. am 1. Neujahrstage 5647 (30. Sept. 1886) im neuhergerichteten Tempel zu Brünn. Brünn: Bernhard Epstein. 1886.
- Nachruf am Sarge des des Hr. Jakob Löw-Beer. 1886.
- "Die Davids-Münze. Denkrede auf Dav. Oppenheim, gehalten am Sabbath לך לך im Tempel zu Brünn". Israelitisches Predigt-Magazin: Homiletische Zeitschrift in Verbindung mit namhaften Predigern. 3 (1). Leipzig: Robert Friese. 1877.
- "Ebher und Misr. Vergleichende paläologische Studien". Jüdisches Litteratur-Blatt. 7 (28–30, 32–5, 38–42, 52). 1877–1878.
- "Die Agada und der Darwinismus und der Darwinismus in der Agada". Jüdisches Litteratur-Blatt. 8. 1878.
- Wiesel und Katze. Ein Beitrag zur Geschichte der Hausthiere. Brünn: W. Burkart. 1888. hdl:2027/coo.31924024786307. Published in English as The Weasel and the Cat in Ancient Times (1887).
- Der Takif. Novelle. Prague: Jakob B. Brandeis. 1895.
- Das Geld. Kanzelrede, geh. am Schemini-Azereth 5657 (29.IX.1896). Vienna. 1896.
- Vogelschutz, oder Insektenschutz?. Brünn: W. Burkart. 1897.
- Die Partein in Israel. Predigten, geh. am 1. u. letzten Pessachtage 5658 (7. u. 14. IV. 1898). Vienna. 1898.
- "Dichterblut". Jahrbuch für Jüdische Geschichte und Literatur. 1: 223–227. 1898.
- Nachruf gehalten an d. Bahre Hieronymus Lorm's am 5. Dez. 1902. Brünn: B. Epstein & Komp. 1902.
- Nachruf gehalten an der Bahre der Frau Peppi Löw Beer geb. Löw Beer, am 22. März 1903 (23 Adar 5663). 1903.
- Animalische Erreger der "spanischen Grippe". Ein neuer Erklärungsversuch. Vienna: C. Gerolds Sohn. 1919.
