= Schaefer Group =

German holding company

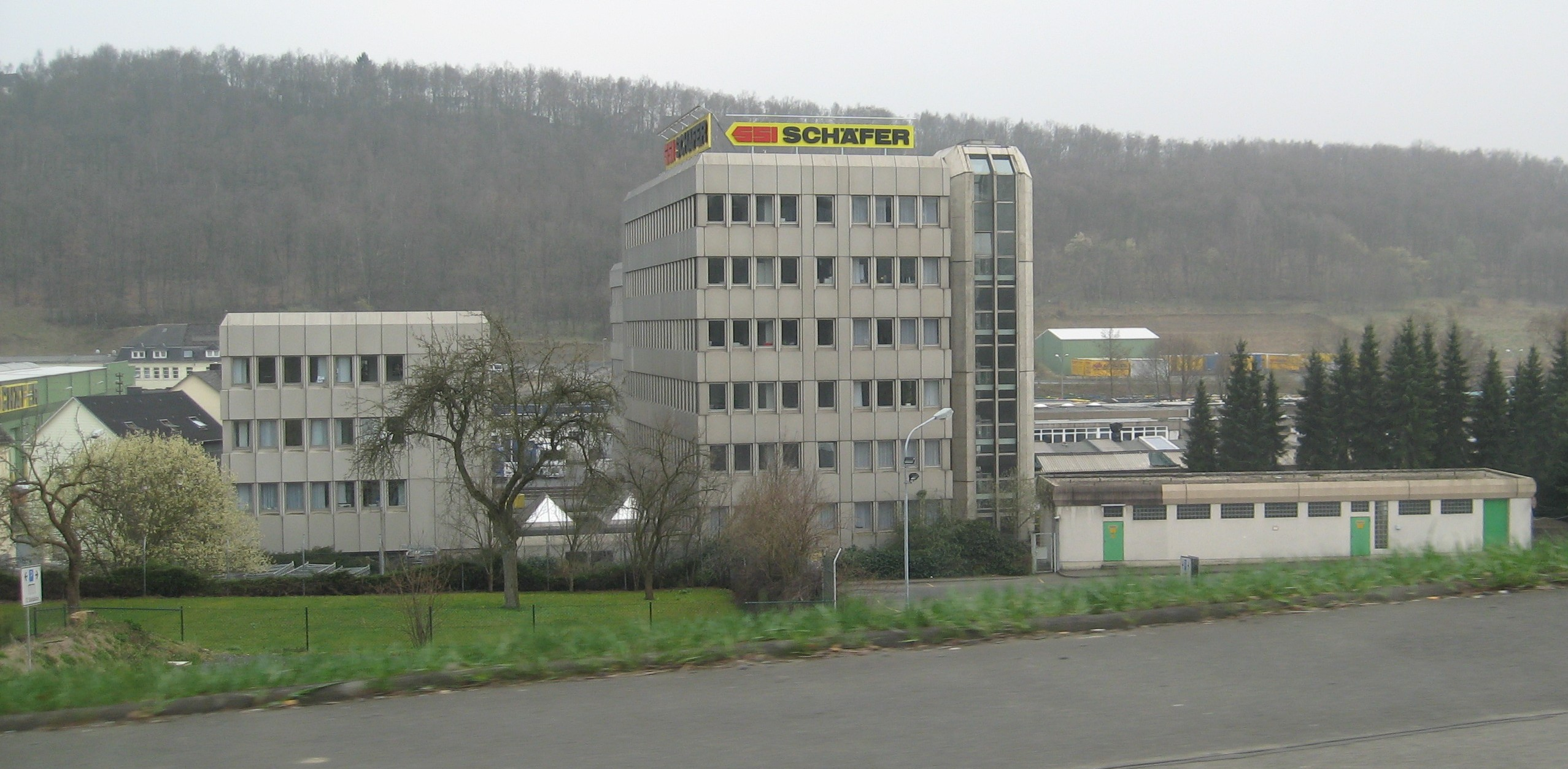
- Headquarter of SSI Schaefer
- Type: Privately held company (GmbH)
- Industry: Manufacturing
- Founded: 1937; 89 years ago in Salchendorf, Neunkirchen
- Founder: Fritz Schaefer
- Headquarters: Neunkirchen (Siegerland), Germany
- Area served: Worldwide
- Products: Warehouse logistics, engineering, manufacturing and industrial distribution
- Owner: Schaefer family
- Number of employees: 11,000 (2022)
- Subsidiaries: SSI Schäfer; Schäfer Werke; Schäfer Shop
- Website: www.ssi-schaefer.com www.schaefer-werke.de www.schaefer-shop.de

The Schaefer Group is a German holding company that consists of three independent, international companies, that started operations in Salchendorf (Neunkirchen) in the district Siegen-Wittgenstein of North Rhine-Westphalia, Germany.

The three companies are SSI Schaefer, providing modular warehouse and logistics systems. Shaefer Works, providing sheet steel and plastic engineered products and Schaefer Shop, providing mail order business for industrial equipment.

The Schaefer Group was the successor of the company Fritz Schaefer GmbH, which was established in 1937. Today, the entrepreneur's sons are in control of these companies, including 16 production facilities on 3 continents and numerous subsidiaries with more than 8,000 employees.

== History ==
In 1937, Fritz Schaefer started a small company in his garage and produced a selection of sheet metal products. After switching to the serial production of transport boxes and containers, the company was able to expand its business and had to set up a larger facility in Neunkirchen-Salchendorf in 1948.

With the death of Fritz Schaefer, his four sons - Hans, Gerhard, Manfred and Theo - took over. After producing boxes for bottled milk for a while, the company then developed fixed storage boxes in 1953, which were originally made from sheet metal, but are now also available in a plastic version. This was the start of SSI Schaefer.

When the mine "Pfannenberger Einigkeit" was closed down in April 1962, the premises were sold to Theo and Manfred Schaefer, sons of the entrepreneur Fritz Schaefer. They established the Pfannenberg GmbH, which started producing workbenches. Soon thereafter, the company was renamed Schäfer Werke KG and began manufacturing radiators and boilers.

In 1971, Hans and Gerhard Schaefer started the Schaefer Shop in Betzdorf whioch would be the Schaefer Shop company.

In February 2020, SSI Scheafer Group named Steffen Bersch as the new CEO. Bersch will join the company on March 1 for a transition period before succeeding current interim CEO Helmut Limberg on April 1.

In 2023, Peter Edelmann became the CEO after Steffen Bersch left the company.

== SSI Scheafer ==
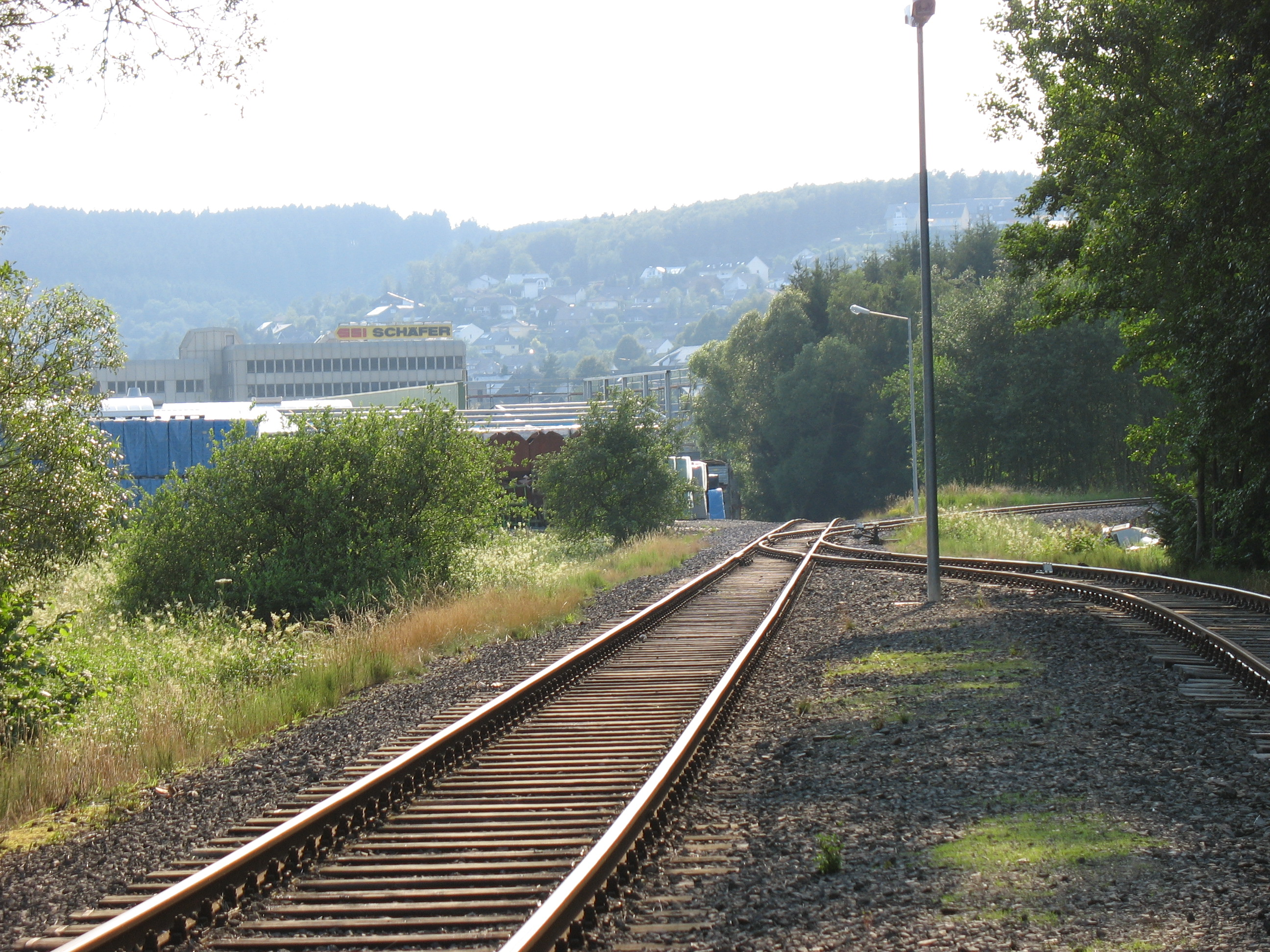
Railroad tracks in Salchendorf, the HQ of SSI Schaefer is visible on the left side

After producing boxes for bottled milk for a while, the company then developed fixed storage boxes in 1953, which were originally made from sheet metal, but are now also available in a plastic version. This marked the beginning of the company's rapid ascent. The production of shelves started in 1958.

In 2000 the company bought SSI Schaefer Noell GmbH (Giebelstadt), a supplier of systems for intralogistics. SSI Schaefer Peem GmbH (Graz, Austria), a provider of order picking technology, was acquired in 2001. Finally, SSI Schaefer took over Salomon Automation GmbH (Friesach near Graz) in 2008, to add logistics software to the portfolio.

== Schaefer Werke ==
When the mine "Pfannenberger Einigkeit" was closed down in April 1962, the premises were sold to Theo and Manfred Schaefer, sons of the entrepreneur Fritz Schaefer. They established the Pfannenberg GmbH, which started producing workbenches. Soon thereafter, the company was renamed Schäfer Werke KG and began manufacturing radiators and boilers.

In the early 1970s, a new facility was set up in Betzdorf called „Schaefer Ausstattungssysteme“ (Schaefer equipment systems). Here, the company developed and produced cabinets, workbenches and other workplace equipment. Today, this also includes IT-system equipment such as server cabinets and network racks.

In addition to heating technology, a polyurethane-covered keg was developed in the following of a crisis in 1978. Perforated plates further broadened the range of products. The sales of heating products spiked in 1994, since they were in high demand in Eastern Germany after the fall of the Berlin Wall. Another facility was established in Ledec nad Sázavou in the Czech Republic in 1995. Since then, Schaefer Sudex is producing containers for beverages and chemicals there. The company set up a fourth facility in Dresden in 1995, and rebuilt it in 2002. Finally, in 2005 the company decided to sell the entire heating division to the Turkish company Demir Döküm. The facility in Dresden was taken over by its former manager Christian Michel in 2009 and subsequently renamed Cooolcase GmbH. Today, Schaefer Werke GmbH (including EMW) employs around 700 people at its 3 remaining sites.

=== EMW Eisen - und Metallhandel GmbH ===
EMW was established in 1952. Its first halls were imported from England and are over 100 years old. Its cracking systems and 80,000 sq m of storage capacity make it one of the leading companies in the industry. Until the end of 2006, a total of 13 halls had been built. Railroad tracks of the mining era are still used to transport coils.

== SSI Schaefer Shop GmbH ==
Hans and Gerhard Schaefer started the Schaefer Shop in Betzdorf in 1971. From there, some of the products of the group are sold through mail order catalogues and online shops. In addition to the main catalogue, which caters primarily to business customers, other catalogues sell giveaways, clothing and decorations. There are now 65 subsidiaries in 19 countries, while the HQ is still in Betzdorf.
