= Hranice (Přerov District) =

Town in the Czech Republic

- Town
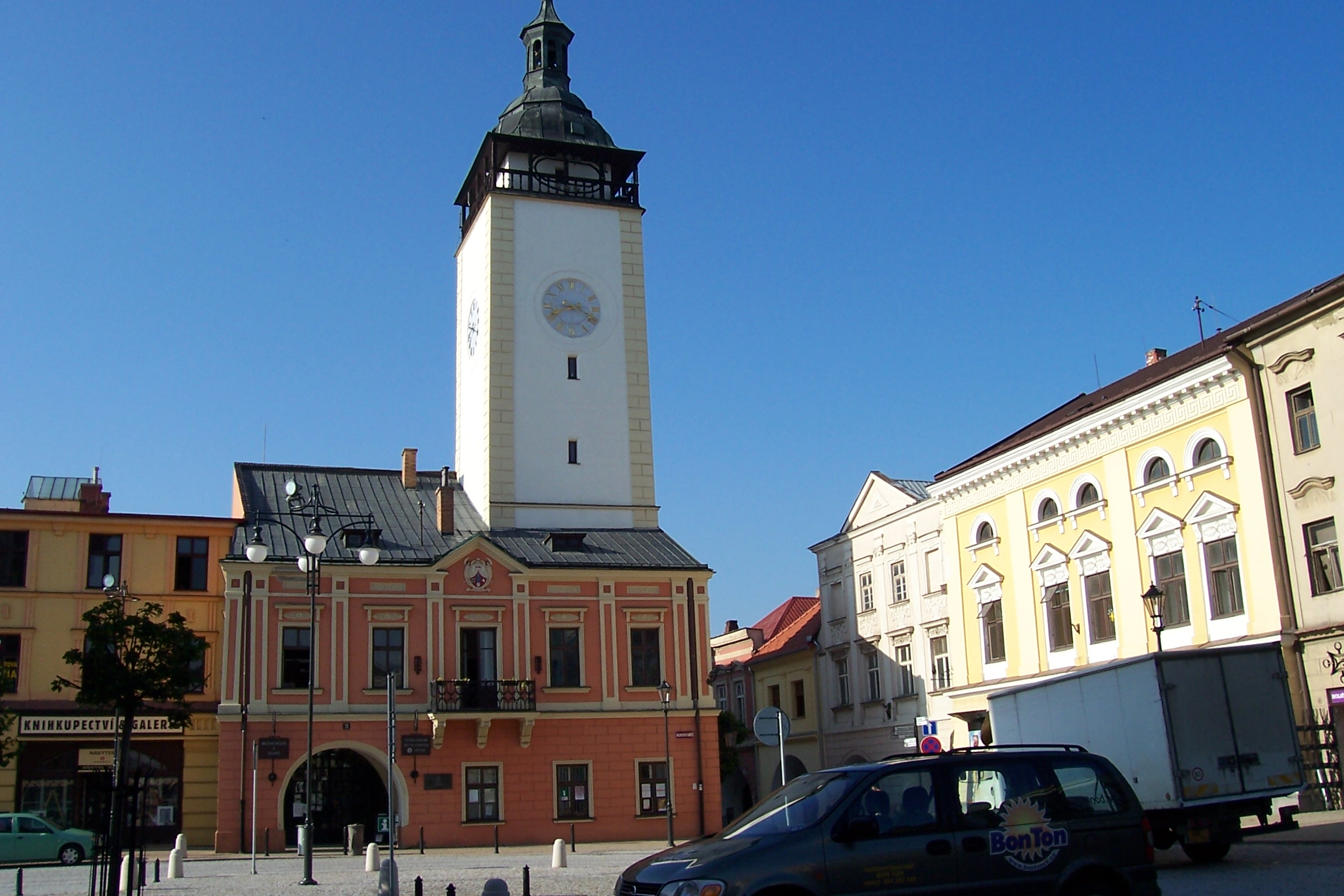
- Masarykovo náměstí with the old town hall

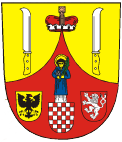
- Flag Coat of arms

- Location in the Czech Republic
- Coordinates: 49°33′9″N 17°46′6″E
- Country: Czech Republic
- Region: Olomouc
- District: Přerov
- Founded: 12th century

Government
  - Mayor: Daniel Vitonský

Area
  - Total: 49.78 km^{2} (19.22 sq mi)
- Elevation: 250 m (820 ft)

Population (2026-01-01)
  - Total: 17,910
  - Density: 359.8/km^{2} (931.8/sq mi)
- Time zone: UTC+1 (CET)
  - Summer (DST): UTC+2 (CEST)
- Postal codes: 753 01, 753 54, 753 61
- Website: www.mesto-hranice.cz

Hranice (Czech pronunciation: [ˈɦraɲɪtsɛ]; German: Mährisch Weißkirchen) is a town in Přerov District in the Olomouc Region of the Czech Republic. It has about 18,000 inhabitants. The town is located on the Bečva River and is known for the Hranice Abyss, the deepest flooded pit cave in the world.

Hranice is an industrial city and railway junction. The historic town centre is well preserved and is protected as an urban monument zone. Among the main landmarks are the Church of the Beheading of Saint John the Baptist and the Hranice Castle.

== Administrative division ==
Hranice consists of nine municipal parts (in brackets population according to the 2021 census):

- Hranice I-Město (14,836)
- Hranice II-Lhotka (91)
- Hranice III-Velká (443)
- Hranice IV-Drahotuše (1,514)
- Hranice V-Rybáře (25)
- Hranice VI-Valšovice (135)
- Hranice VII-Slavíč (298)
- Hranice VIII-Středolesí (71)
- Hranice IX-Uhřínov (56)

Středolesí and Uhřínov form an exclave of the municipal territory.

== Etymology ==
The name Hranice literally means 'border' in Czech. It is sometimes called Hranice na Moravě ("Hranice in Moravia") to distinguish from other places with the same name.

== Geography ==
Hranice is located about 22 kilometres (14 mi) northeast of Přerov and 33 km (21 mi) east of Olomouc. It lies mostly in the Moravian Gate lowland. The exclave of the municipal territory lies already in the Nízký Jeseník mountain range and contains the highest point of Hranice, which is the hill Studená at 626 metres (2,054 ft) above sea level. The Bečva River flows through the town.

The deepest pit cave in the Czech Republic, Hranice Abyss with a length of 473.5 metres (1,553 ft), is located by the town. With a water depth of 404 metres (1,325 ft), it is also the deepest flooded abyss in the world.

== History ==
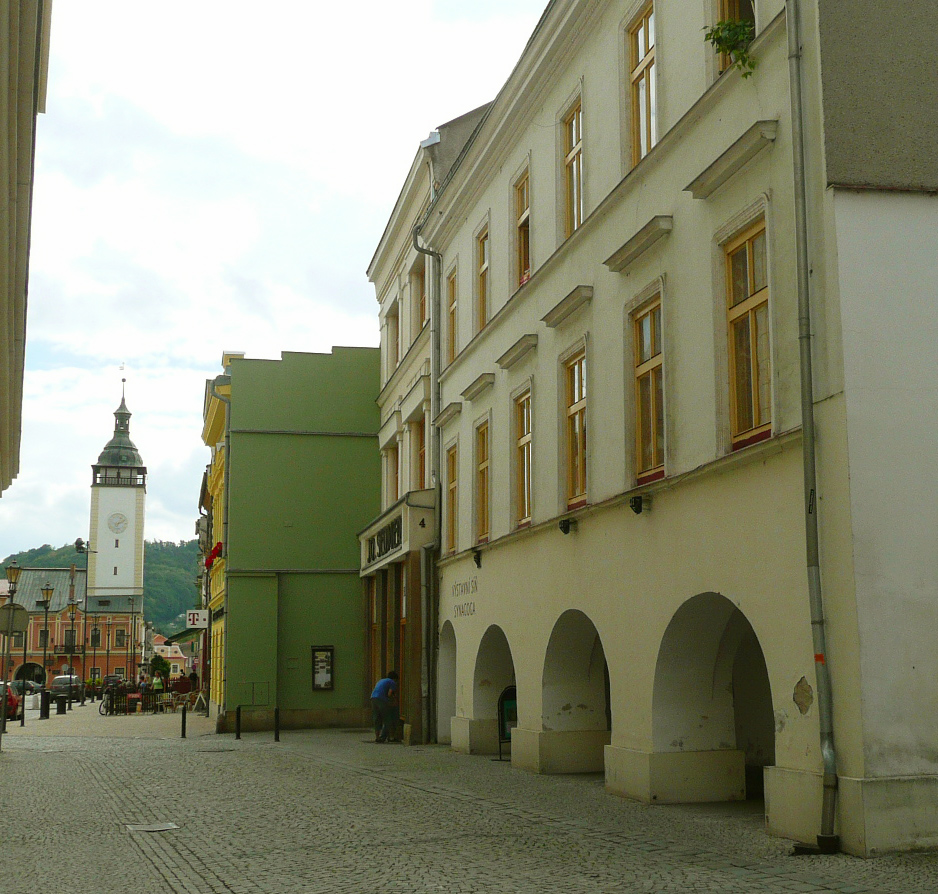
Last arcades house of the Jewish quarter

The first written mention of Hranice is in a falsificated document from 1169. According to the trusted sources, Hranice already existed at the end of the 12th century. In 1276, Hranice became a town. From the 1420s, the town became a property of the Cimburk family, and from 1499 a property of the Pernštejn family. In the 16th and 17th centuries, the estate often changed owners.

Until 1918, Hranice was part of Austria-Hungary in the district with the same name, one of the 34 Bezirkshauptmannschaften in Moravia.

In 1851–1853, a large military academy was established in the town. Notable graduates include Archduke Wilhelm of Austria, Herman Potočnik, Adolf Opálka and Václav Morávek. The academy was abolished in 1950; however, the building still serves the military.

=== Jewish population ===
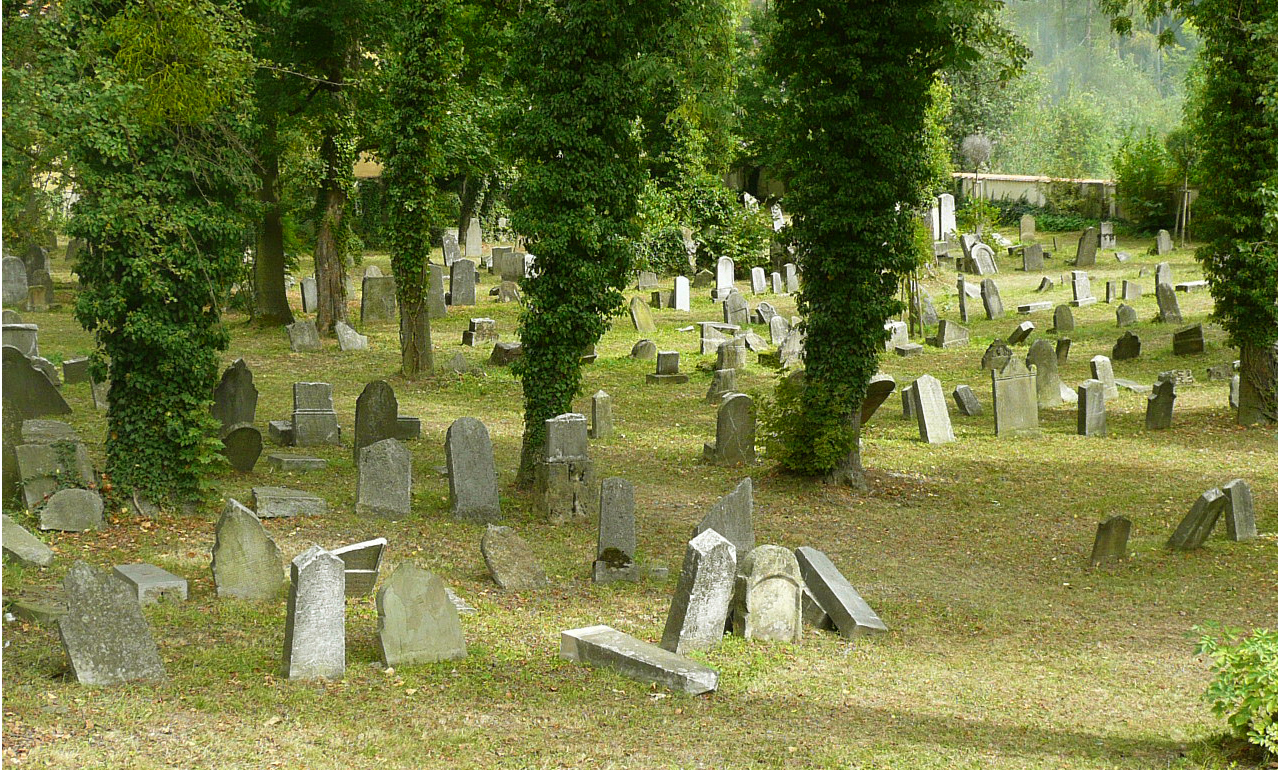
Jewish cemetery

The first Jews came in 1611, receiving in 1637 the right for a self-governed Jewish quarter, where a maximum of 120 Jewish families were permitted to reside. Besides those 17 houses, located around the present Janáčkova street (renamed from Židovská street), they were not allowed to purchase houses elsewhere. In 1728, 115 families resided in the Jewish quarter and in 1789 the community had reached the maximum of 120 families. The community reached its peak of 802 people in 1857 (13% of the entire town). They had a significant role in the development of Hranice's industry: a textile plant established in 1844 (the largest factory until the mid-20th century), and distilleries (1827, 1836).

== Demographics ==
Historical population

Year	Pop.	±%
1869	9,580	—
1880	10,395	+8.5%
1890	11,183	+7.6%
1900	11,299	+1.0%
1910	12,306	+8.9%

Year	Pop.	±%
1921	12,511	+1.7%
1930	14,368	+14.8%
1950	14,997	+4.4%
1961	14,033	−6.4%
1970	15,338	+9.3%

Year	Pop.	±%
1980	17,634	+15.0%
1991	19,507	+10.6%
2001	19,670	+0.8%
2011	18,397	−6.5%
2021	17,469	−5.0%

Source: Censuses

== Economy ==
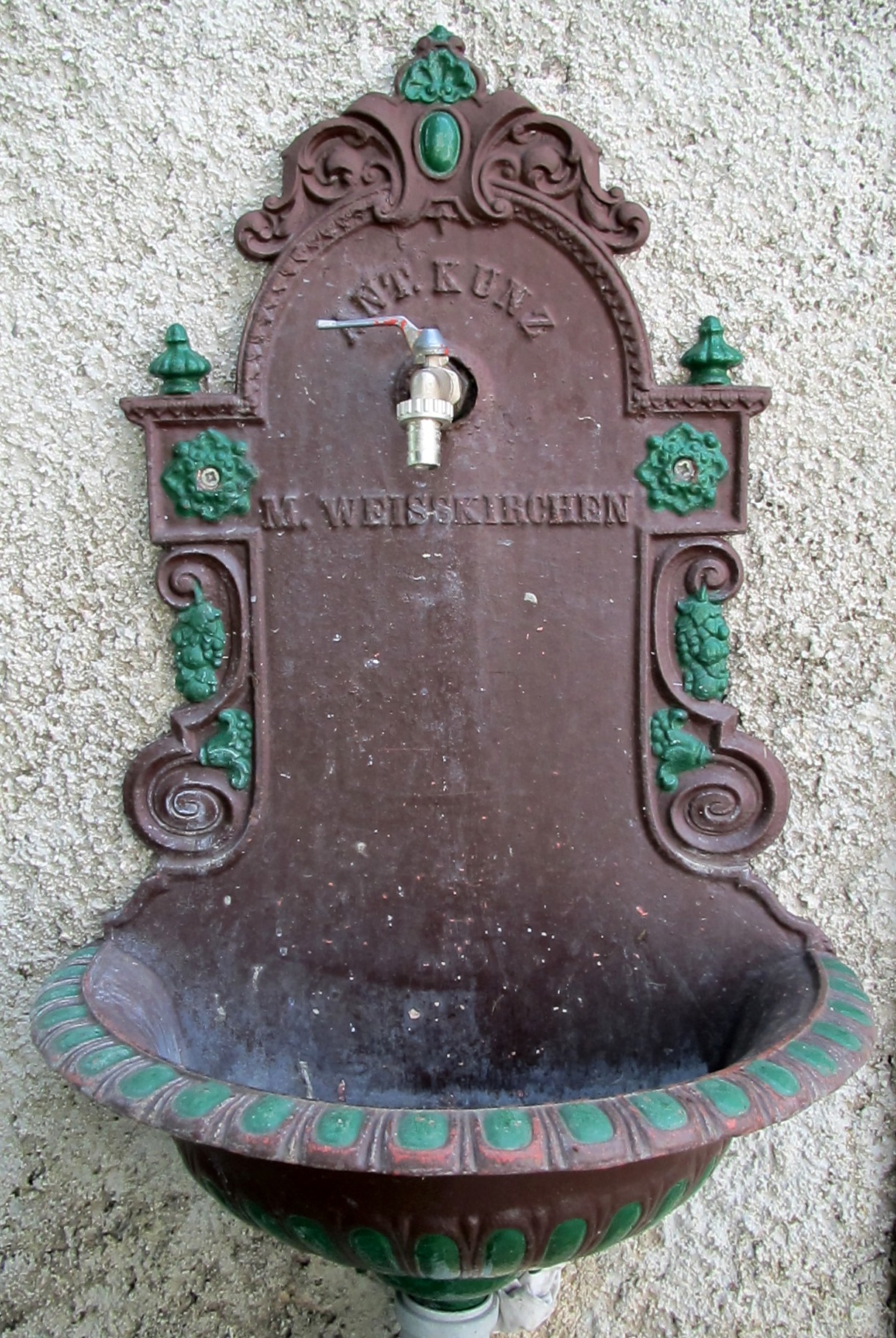
Sink from the Kunz factory in Zavratec, Slovenia

The largest employer based in the town is SSI Schäfer, manufacturer of metal structures with more than 1,000 employees. Other notable employers with more than 500 employees are Henniges Hranice (manufacturer of rubber products for automotive industry), KROK CZ (manufacturer of work clothes), and Hranice Hospital.

In 1883, Antonín Kunz founded a company in Hranice that specialised in the production of windpumps and other pumps. The company became the largest factory for water pumps in Austria-Hungary. At the end of the 19th century, it also produced complete communal water systems that were in towns and cities in the whole Austria-Hungary. The Sigma Pumps company developed out of Kunz's company.

== Transport ==
The D1 motorway leading from Přerov to Ostrava bypasses the town in the north.

Hranice is a railway hub. The town is located on the railway lines Prague–Vsetín, continuing further to Slovakia and Hungary, and Brno–Bohumín, continuing further to Poland. The town is served by the stations Hranice na Moravě, Hranice na Moravě město and Drahotuše. In the municipal territory is also located the station Teplice nad Bečvou, which serves the neighbouring municipality of Teplice nad Bečvou.

== Sights ==
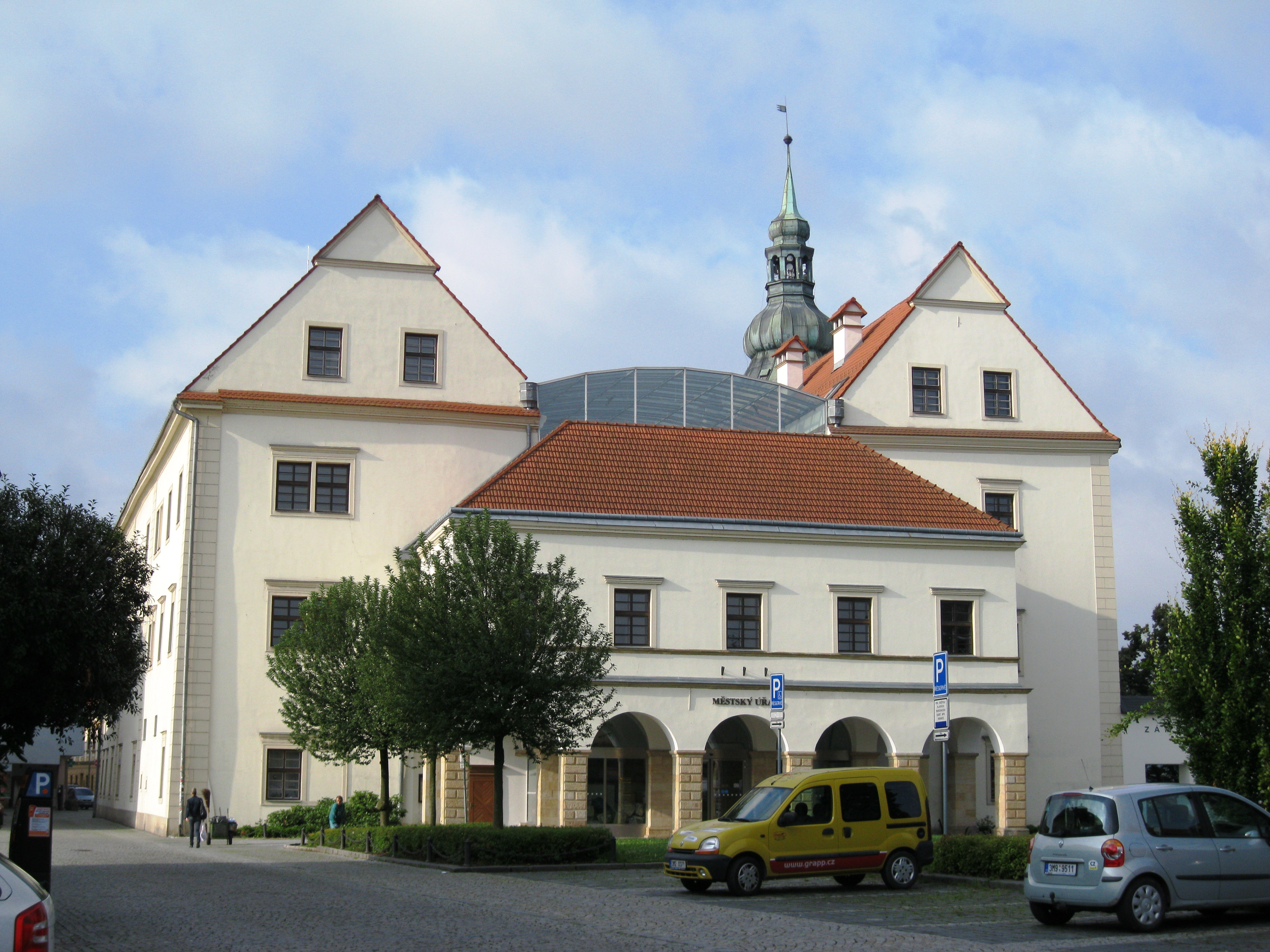
Hranice Castle

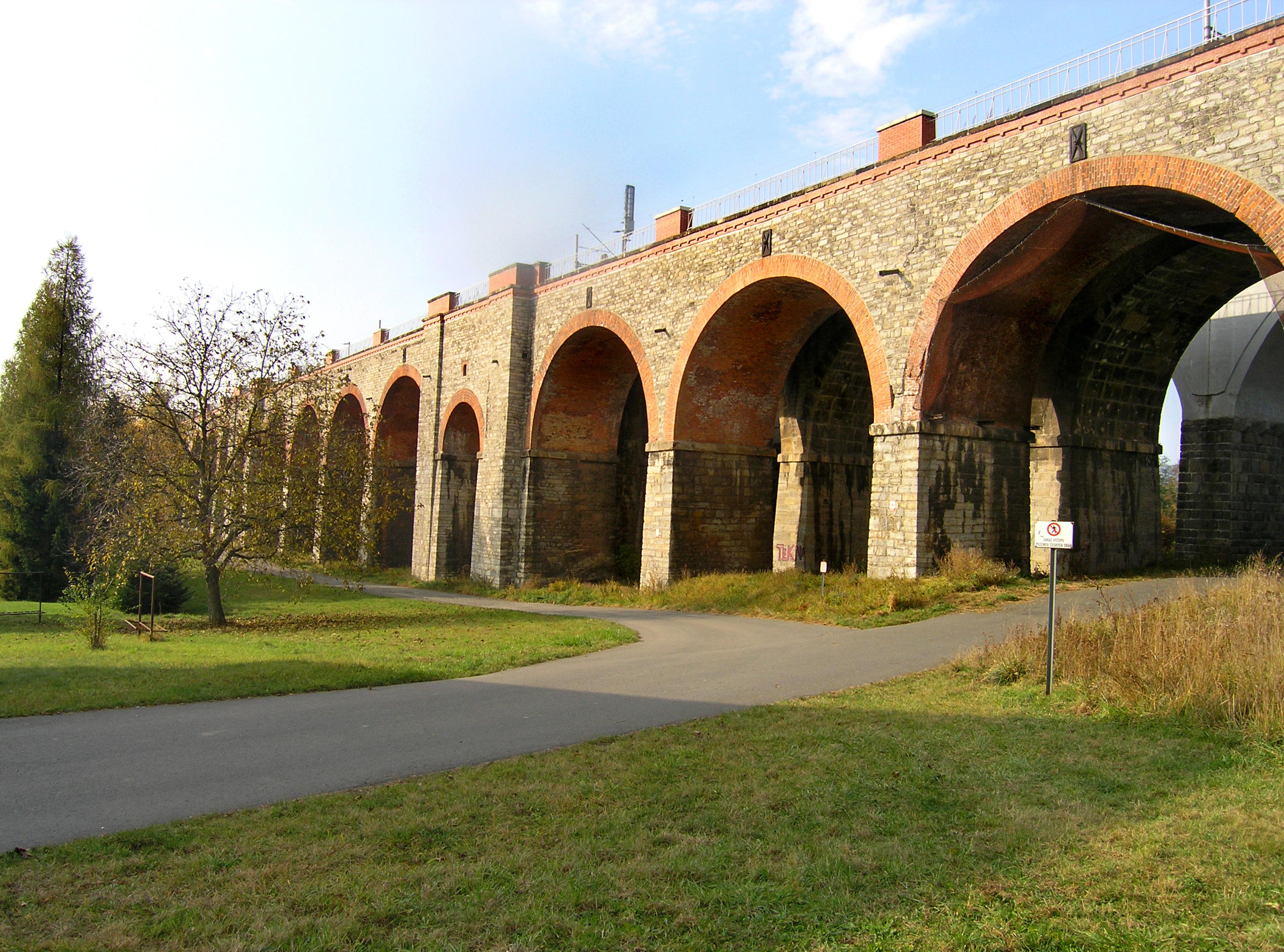
Hranice Viaducts

Since 1992, the historic town centre is protected as an urban monument zone. The Church of the Beheading of Saint John the Baptist is the main landmark of the town square. The construction was finished in 1763. It is a massive Baroque-Neoclassical building with valuable decorations of the interior. The second significant building on the square is the old town hall. It served its purpose until 1998, when the offices moved to the premises of the castle. Today it serves as a library, a museum, and a concert hall.

The Hranice Castle was formerly a Gothic castle of the Cimburk lords. In the 16th–17th centuries, it was rebuilt in the Renaissance style. Today it serves as the town hall, museum and art gallery.

The Jewish community is commemorated by several monuments. The original small synagogue was replaced in 1863 by a new larger building in Moorish-Byzantine style. It is used for cultural purposes. The Jewish cemetery was used until 1965. The oldest preserved tombstone is from 1685.

The most valuable technical monument are the Hranice Viaducts. The three viaducts are 430 metres (1,410 ft) long. The oldest one was built in 1844–1846.

== Notable people ==
- Daniel Strejc-Vetterus (1592–1669), priest of the Unity of the Brethren
- Aaron Chorin (1766–1844), Hungarian rabbi
- Baruch Placzek (1834–1922), rabbi and author
- Isidore Singer (1859–1939), author and editor
- Norbert Falk (1872–1932), Austrian journalist and screenwriter
- Franz Petrak (1886–1973), Austrian-Czech mycologist
- Albert Kutal (1904–1976), historian
- Helmut Otto Hofer (1912–1989), Austrian anatomist and zoologist
- Jiří Brdečka (1917–1982), screenwriter and writer
- Ivan Sviták (1925–1994), philosopher and poet
- Dalibor Janda (born 1962), singer
- Aleš Opata (born 1964), military leader

== Twin towns – sister cities ==
Hranice is twinned with:

- Hlohovec, Slovakia
- Konstancin-Jeziorna, Poland
- Leidschendam-Voorburg, Netherlands
- Slovenske Konjice, Slovenia

== See also ==
- The Confusions of Young Törless, a novel based on experience in the Hranice military academy
