= Saxon Mining Office =

Government agency in Saxony, Germany

Coordinates: 50.919951°N 13.341908°E

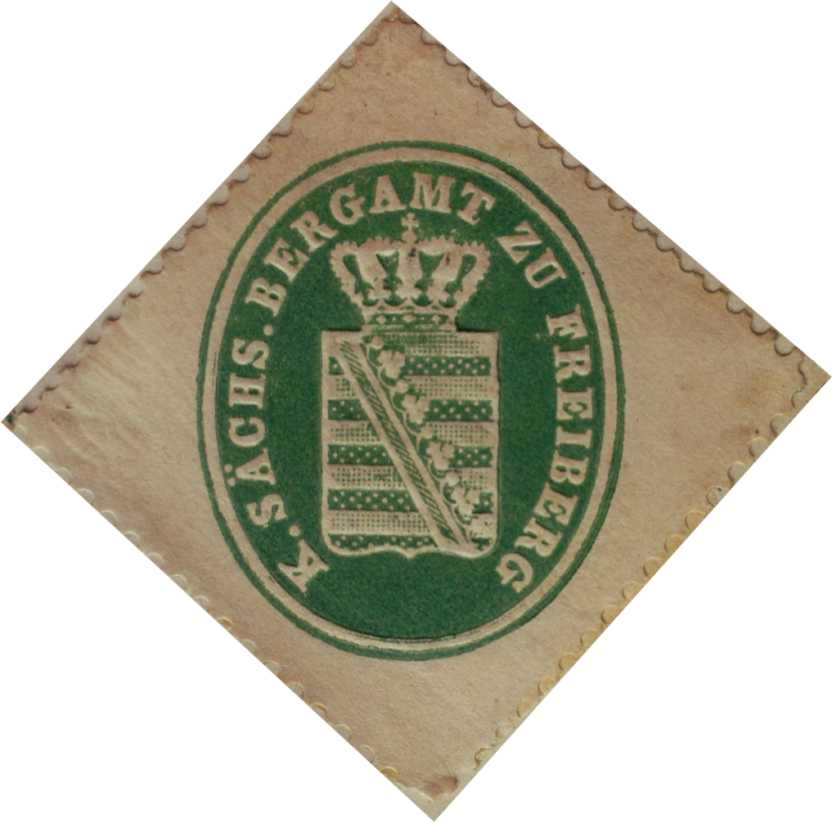
Seal of the Mining Office (ca. 1880)

The Saxon Mining Office (German: Sächsisches Oberbergamt) is the executive authority for mining rights in the German state of Saxony. It is also responsible for all non-metallic mineral resources on the terrain of the former East Germany.

== History ==
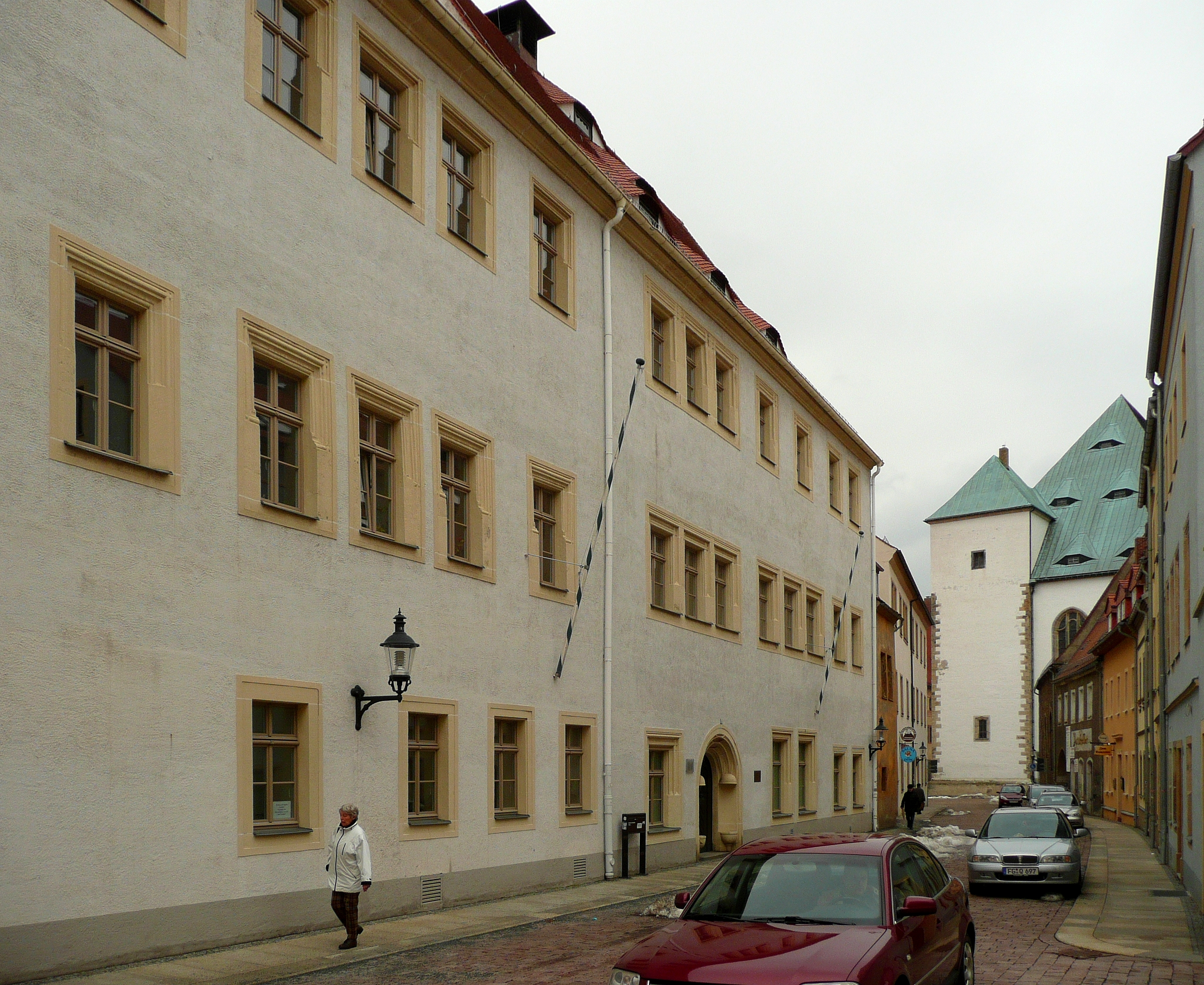
The Saxon Mining Office at Freiberg's Kirchgasse street

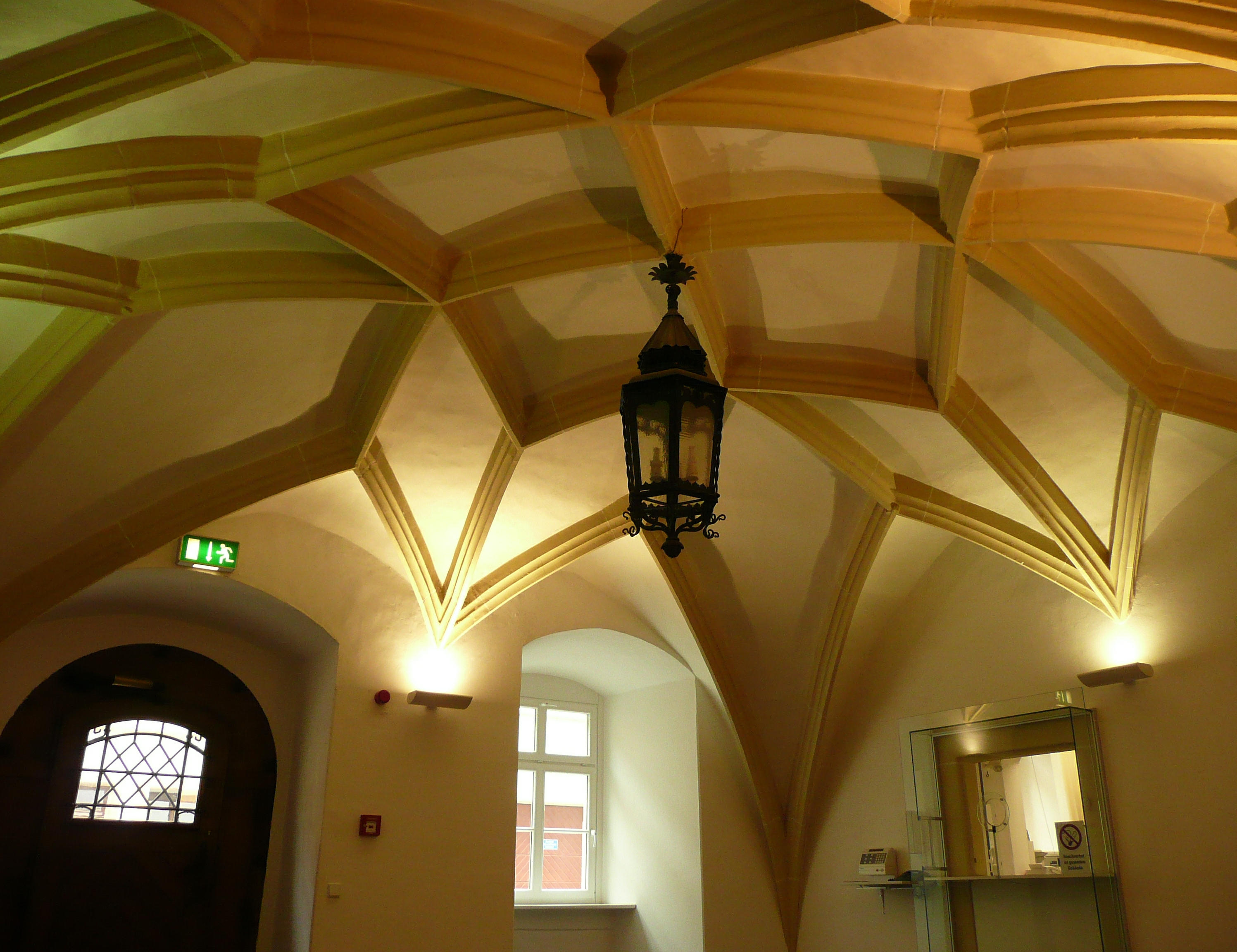
Star vaulting (Sterngewölbe) on the ground floor of the Saxon Mining Office

Based on discoveries of silver in 1168, Freiberg developed into the centre of Ore Mountains and Saxon ore mining. A mining office (Bergamt) and master miner (Bergmeister) were mentioned here in 1241. Freiberg mining law (Bergrecht), first laid down in writing in 1307, was subsequently adopted in many other European mining regions.

In 1470 rich silver finds in the Ore Mountains (at Schneeberg Annaberg-Buchholz and Marienberg) resulted in a new (the second) Berggeschrey(silver rush). The mining industry expanded rapidly, and in the wake of this growth a single mining administration was gradually set up in Albertine Saxony during the early 16th century. The Annaberg mining regulations (Bergordnung) enacted in 1509 by George the Bearded superseded the Freiberg Mining Law and established a substantial basis for Central European mining law until the 19th century. The date of foundation of the Mining Office was 1 July 1542, thus the Saxon Mining Office is the oldest mining authority in Germany.

The Mining Office (known since the mid-17th century as the Oberbergamt or "Head Mining Office") gradually emerged in a long historical process that began in the mid-16th century. A statewide mining administration was established (initially across the Duchy, but from 1547 across the Electorate of Saxony) under Duke Moritz with the commissioning of Simon Bogner as mining advocate (Bergvoigt) and Hans Röhlings as the mining office manager (Bergamtsverwalter) on St. Matthew's Day, 21 Sep 1545. This process of establishment concluded with the appointment of Hans Röhlings' son, Markus Röhlings, as the senior master miner (Oberbergmeister) of the Albertine Electorate of Saxony in 1554.

The earliest forerunners of the senior mining officials of the 17th century may be considered to be Lorenz von Schönberg, who was appointed in 1577 as mining steward (Bergamtmann) and Christoph von Schönberg who was appointed mining captain (Berghauptmann) in 1588.

Following the chancellery law (Kanzleiordnung) passed on 5 August 1547 by Elector Moritz, five districts were created, each headed by a chief official (the Oberhauptmann). The first Oberhauptmann of the mountain district was Heinrich von Gersdorf. Since the most important Saxon mining towns and ore fields lay within this district, he was – in addition to his many general managerial duties, including military security and finances – responsible for the mining industry. Thus under him were both the officers of the Saxon authorities and the officials appointed to the mining administration. Those appointed as Oberhauptmann in the mountain district were not therefore the functional predecessors of the later chief mining officials (the Oberberghauptmann/Berghauptmann) – they acted as heads of a special or technical authority, the Mining Authority (Oberbergamt) – but were the first representatives of territorial administrative units that were hierarchically arranged between the newly established privy council (Hofrat) of the ducal court and the local district offices. The function of the (later so called) district captains (Kreishauptleute) continued even after the disbandment of the Electorate of Saxony's mining authority (with a Oberberghauptmann or Berghauptmann at the head of this specialized department) until well into the 18th century.

=== 18th century and beyond ===
Until 1869, the Mining Office was responsible for the economic and technical management of all mines, exercising the royal mining rights (Bergregal) as part of the "divisional concept" with the aim of maximising profit for the Saxon electors and kings. It was accompanied by the creation of a geological service (later the Department of State Geognostic Research). Again and again, the Saxon Mining Office and its senior mining officials led the way to important scientific developments. For example, in 1713, Oberberghauptmann Hans Carl von Carlowitz introduced the concept of sustainability. A few decades later Oberberghauptmann Friedrich Wilhelm von Oppel and Generalbergkommissar Friedrich Anton von Heynitz were instrumental in founding the Freiberg Mining Academy.

During the Industrial Revolution and the rise of liberalization, the divisional concept was superseded by the Mining Act (Berggesetz) of 16 June 1868 which came into force on 3 January 1869. The Bergregal was replaced by the Mining Rights for Ore and the State Clause for Salt. Organizationally, the inspector concept followed the divisional concept, which limited the authority of the mining authority largely to safety issues. With a further act of 1 December 1868 the existing head mining office (Oberbergamt) and the mining offices at Freiberg, Marienberg and Schwarzenberg were dissolved, and merged into a pan-Saxon Freiberg Mining Office (Bergamt zu Freiberg). Master miners (Bergmeister) then became responsible for the regions.

On 1 April 1943, a Saxon Mining Office, along with other German head mining offices, was merged into the central Reich mining authority, temporarily ending its 400-year history as a state mining authority.

In 1991 a Saxon Mining Office was re-established, and made responsible for occupational safety, health, environmental protection and resource conservation in the Saxon mines. In 2010 the Mining Office supervised more than 297 subsidised mining companies (including 293 non-metallic mineral companies, the four Saxon lignite mines of Nochten, Reichwalde, United Schleenhain and Profen), 78 unsubsidised mining firms, and over 103 restoration businesses and facilities (including but not limited to the sites of bismuth-uranium mines). Another important task is the remediation of historic closed mining facilities, especially old adits like the Rothschönberger Stolln and the Marx-Semler-Stolln.

== Location ==
The headquarters of the Mining Office, re-established in December 1991, is Freiberg, where it is founded on a long tradition and is also connected with the Freiberg Mining Academy. The Mining Office was first located at Freudenstein Castle. In 1679, it was moved to the Freihaus of the Schönlebe family at No. 11, Kirchgasse. Built around 1500, the late-Gothic building was extended in the 19th century by one floor. On the ground floor and first floor is interesting stellar and net vaulting of the ceilings. The neighbouring house, No. 13 Kirchgasse, was home to the Head Mining Office from 1679 to 1859 that had been founded in 1555.

== Chief mining officials ==
Amongst those appointed as Saxon chief mining officials (Berghauptleute) were such notable figures as Abraham von Schönberg, Hans Carl von Carlowitz, Friedrich Wilhelm Heinrich von Trebra, Sigismund August Wolfgang von Herder and Johann Carl Freiesleben.

== Literature ==
- Walter Fischer: 400 Jahre Sächsisches Oberbergamt Freiberg (1542-1942). Die Bedeutung dieser Dienststelle für die Entwicklung der Geologie und Lagerstättenkunde. In: Zeitschrift der Deutschen Geologischen Gesellschaft 95(1943), pp. 143–183.
- Otfried Wagenbreth, Eberhard Wächtler: Bergbau im Erzgebirge. Technische Denkmale und Geschichte, Verlag für Grundstoffindustrie, Leipzig, 1990. ISBN 3-342-00509-2
- Herbert Kaden: Die Bergverwaltung des albertinischen Sachsen unter Herzog/ Kurfürst Moritz zwischen 1542 und 1548. In: Mitteilungen des Freiberger Altertumsvereins 72 (1992), pp. 36–46.
- Herbert Kaden: Die Bergverwaltung Freibergs in der ersten Hälfte des 16.Jahrhunderts. In: Mitteilungen des Freiberger Altertumsvereins 78 (1997), pp. 25–31.
- Herbert Kaden: Der Beginn der Herausbildung einer mittleren Bergverwaltung im albertinischen Sachsen um die Mitte des 16. Jahrhunderts. In: Mitteilungen des Freiberger Altertumsvereins 93 (2003), pp. 23–83.
- Sächsisches Oberbergamt (Hg.): 450 Jahre Sächsisches Oberbergamt Freiberg. Freiberg, 1993.
- Reinhard Schmidt: Die sächsischen Bergbehörden. In: World of Mining 58(2006)1, pp. 51–52.
- Friedrich Wernicke: 400 Jahre Oberbergamt Freiberg 1542-1942. Berlin, 1942.
