= Abraham Abramson =

Prussian coin maker (1752/1754–1811)

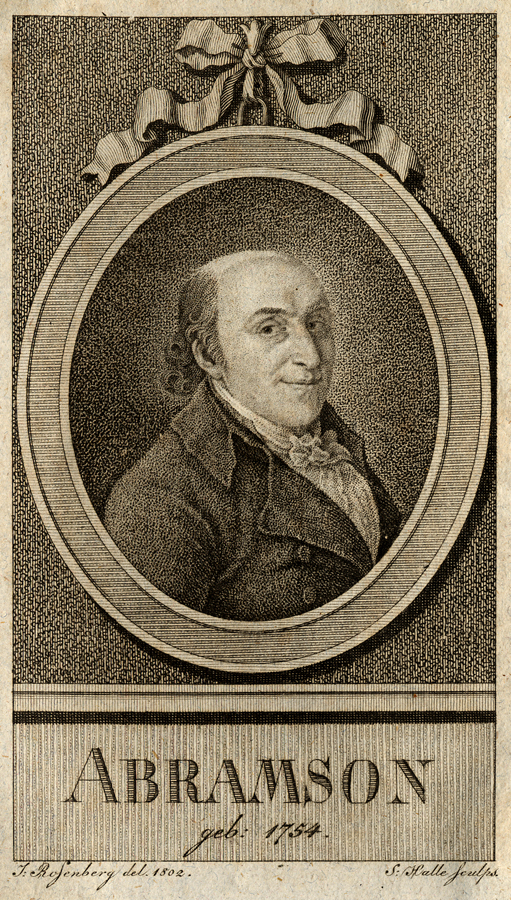
- Abraham Abramson (1754–1811)
- Born: c. 1754; Potsdam
- Died: 28 July 1811; Berlin

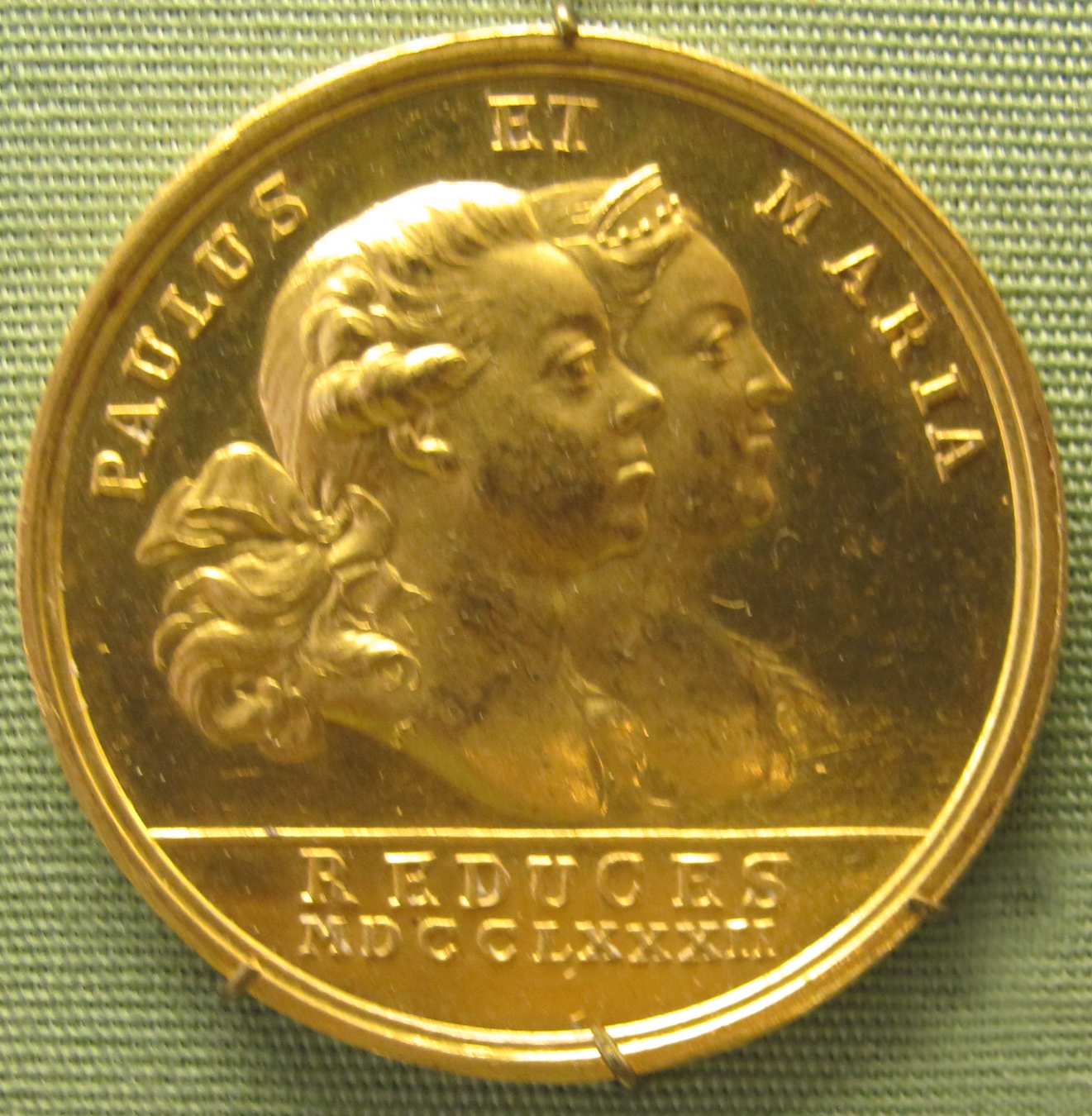
1783 medals of the Royal couple of Russia

Abraham Abramson (1752 or 1754 – 28 July 1811) was a Prussian coiner and medallist. Born into a Jewish family, he later converted to Protestantism.

== Life ==
Son of the coiner Jacob Abraham, like him Abramson belonged to the court of Frederick the Great, and he also was the first Jew to be admitted into the Prussian Academy of Arts.

Abramson was a prolific medalist. He depicted among others Immanuel Kant, Gotthold Ephraim Lessing, Moses Mendelssohn, Christoph Martin Wieland, Johann Georg Sulzer and Leonhard Euler.

== Bullion Suppliers to the Berlin Mint ==
The Hohenzollern Elector of Brandenberg, Frederick William (1620–88) appointed Israel Aaron as bullion supplier to the Berlin mint and granted the right of striking small coins to Esther Liebmann, wife first of Israel Aaron and then, after Aaron's death to the Court jeweller, Jost Liebmann.

As Hohenzollern King of Prussia, Frederick William I (1688–1740) reluctantly appointed Jewish mint suppliers after Christian officials had failed. Levin Veit was succeeded in this function by the Gompertz brothers, the tobacco manufacturers. Frederick the Great (1740–86) shared his father's prejudices but found it necessary to lease the state mint to the Jews. In 1751 the Gompertz brothers joined with the banker Daniel Itzig and his brother-in-law Moses Isaak to lease the six state mints. In 1755 they beat competition from the Fraenkel brothers to retain this concession. In 1758 these factions merged and shared the ignominy of the anti-Semitism provoked by Frederick's devaluation in order to finance his many wars, although this expedient may have saved the Prussian state.

In the design of medals the celebration of personalities and events was the province of the individual artist or craftsman. However, Frederick the Great imposed restrictions on creativity and the Swiss Hedlinger and his pupil Georgi resigned. The supply of bullion to the Prussian mint at Berlin by Jews since the early 17th century would now pave the way for a highly skilled medallic craftsman and contemporary of Meyer Rothschild.

== Jacob Abraham and Abraham Abramson ==
Jacob Abraham (1723–1800) originated in the German duchy of Mecklenburg-Strelitz. He first cut precious gems at the age of thirteen in Polish Lissa. On the death of his father in 1731 the family moved to Sverin and then to Mecklenburg. In 1750 he married Beilchen, daughter of a teacher. His talents were recognised by Frederick the Great who confirmed his appointment at the Berlin mint as a die cutter in 1752 after a two-year apprenticeship. The following year, at the age of 31, he was transferred to Stettin as Royal Medalist to inaugurate a new mint. He also engraved small coins and Polish money before moving to Königsberg in 1755. Abraham fled before the Russian advance in the Seven Years' War (1756–63) to Danzig in 1758, Dresden in 1759 and Berlin in 1761 where he cut a new Prussian eagle for the thaler and struck medals in honour of Frederick's military successes. In his biography Hoffmann describes Abraham as astute, intelligent and industrious; more of a craftsman than an artist. He worked at both the Neue Muntze and Berlin Altmuntze. In the last twenty years of his life his powers declined and much of his work was done collaboratively with his son Abraham Abramson. Forrer catalogued the better known works. Of note is the famous medal of Moses Mendelssohn where the portraiture is the work of the son. In the English series the marriage medal of George III is noteworthy. On his death in 1800, he was, most unusually, granted full civil rights, and laid to rest at the Hamburg Street Cemetery, Berlin (row 28, stone 19!) with many tributes.

Abramson (1754–1811) was the most successful of Abraham's three artistic sons. The male children, Abraham, Hirsch and Michel inherited full civil rights, but these were not available to female offspring, Roschen and Yachet. The descendants of Roschen could still be traced in Berlin in Hoffmann's time. Abraham officially became his father's assistant at the Berlin mint at the age of seventeen. He was appointed Royal Medalist in 1782 after a long apprenticeship and travelled extensively from 1787 to 1791 learning design and modelling techniques, mainly in Italy. He is considered the outstanding medalist of this remarkable period. His output was enormous amounting to over 250 medals. He was fortunate to be at the height of his powers at such a time of artistic, scientific and technological advance, military struggle, political and social reform. His best known medal in the English series is that commemorating the death of Nelson in 1805. Again Forrer lists many of the more outstanding works and Hoffmann gives a remarkably comprehensive catalogue of father and son. Abramson died from overwork at the age of 57.

== Works ==
- In the royal court, Abraham Abramson coined two medals, for the marriage in Berlin of Sophie Dorothea of Württemberg and Paul I of Russia, for which the celebrations reportedly were of the most splendid of those years.

== Sources ==
- Allgemeine Deutsche Biographie – online version
- Jacob Abraham und Abraham Abramson, 55 Jahre Berliner Medaillenkunst, 1755–1810, Tassilo Hoffmann (Frankfurt am Main, 1927).
- Jewish Minters & Medalists, Daniel M. Friedenberg, ISBN 0-8276-0066-6, Philadelphia, 1976.
