= Bergmeister =

Mine manager or foreman in German-speaking Europe

A Bergmeister (Latin: Magister montium) was a mine manager or foreman in German-speaking Europe who, along with the Bergvogt, was one of the officials serving on a mining court (Berggericht). There were Bergmeisters in every mining district in Germany. In Austria the Bergmeister was also called the Obristbergmeister.

== Sweden ==
In Sweden the title Bergmästare has been known since 1347 and is since 1630 a title for persons responsible for the concession and creating of new mines in Sweden.

== See also ==
- Bergordnung
- Bergrecht
- Bergregal
