= Markus Magnus =

Court Jew

Personal life
- Died: 1736
- Occupation: Court Jew

Religious life
- Religion: Judaism

Markus Magnus (d. 1736) was an Elder of the Jewish community of Berlin in the first quarter of the eighteenth century and court Jew to the crown prince, afterward King Frederick William I.

The Jewish community of Berlin was divided into two hostile camps by Magnus' quarrels with his rival, wealthy jeweler Jost Liebmann. Frederick I favored the latter, while the crown prince supported Magnus, as did Berlin's increasingly-prominent Viennese Jewish families, who had been expelled from their native city under Leopold I.

After the death of Liebmann, his widow and sons continued these quarrels, which ended in the victory of Magnus. He induced the members of the community to build a public synagogue in place of the private synagogue previously maintained by members of the Liebmann family. The new Great Synagogue was consecrated on Rosh Hashanah, 14 September 1714, in the presence of Queen Sophie Dorothea. When on 16 March 1722 the government issued a new regulation for the administration of the Berlin Jewish congregation, Magnus and Moses Levi Gumpertz were appointed permanent chief elders with a salary of 300 thalers each.
