= Jacob Abraham (given names) =

Jacob Abraham is a pair of given names. Notable people with the names include:

- Jacob Abraham de Mist (1749–1823), Dutch statesman
- Jacob ben Abraham Faitusi (died 1812), Tunisian Jewish scholar
- Jacob ben Abraham Kahana (died 1826), rabbinical author

== See also ==
- Jacob Abraham, American computer scientist
- Jacob Abraham (medalist) (1723–1800), German Jewish medalist
- Philippe-Jacques Abraham (1848–1915), Chaldean Catholic bishop
