= Mining act =

The main purpose of mining acts (German: Berggesetze) in law is to govern the structure of mining authorities and their responsibilities, the entitlement to mining and the oversight of safety in and around the mines. With the introduction of parliamentary legislative powers, they replaced the earlier mining regulations issued by royalty or nobility to their states and territories.

== See also ==
- Bergamt - German mining office
- Bergrecht - mining law
- Bergregal - mining rights
- Bergordnung - mining regulations
- Mining law
