= Aaron ben Benjamin Wolf =

German rabbi (c.1670–1721)

Rabbi Aaron ben Benjamin Wolf

Personal life
- Born: c. 1670
- Died: July 25, 1721

Religious life
- Religion: Judaism

Aaron ben Benjamin Wolf (about 1670 – July 25, 1721) was a Rabbi at Berlin and then at Frankfort-on-the-Oder, where he lived until his death.

His father, Isaac Benjamin Wolf ben Eliezer Liebman, author of Naḥlat Binyamin (Amsterdam, 1682), rabbi in the mark of Brandenburg, was the brother of the court Jew Jost Liebmann, who played a prominent part in the congregation of Berlin in the earliest period of its history. Aaron married Resel, the daughter of his uncle, who founded for him a Talmudical school and supported not only Aaron but also his disciples. In 1697, when the declining health of Shemariah, then rabbi of Berlin, necessitated the appointment of a successor, Aaron was made rabbi of the mark, and in 1709 was appointed by King Frederick I of Prussia to the office of chief rabbi of Berlin, with jurisdiction over all the Jews living in the mark. But with the death of King Frederick I conditions changed. Esther, the widow of Jost Liebman, fell into disfavor with Frederick William I, her property was confiscated, and she died of a broken heart in 1714.

These reverses made it impossible for Aaron to maintain his students; and the factions in the congregation of Berlin caused him constant anxiety, especially since he had always sided with his wife's family, which was very unpopular with the community. He was finally forced to leave Berlin and went to Frankfort-on-the-Oder, where he officiated as rabbi until his death. He left some works, though none has been printed. He wrote several approbations (haskamot) to books, published in Berlin, notably that to the first edition of Samuel ben Meir's commentary on the Pentateuch (1705), the manuscript of which was in the possession of David Oppenheimer, to whom he was related by marriage. His approbation of Nehemiah Ḥayyun's cabalistic work, 'Oz le-Elohim (1712), caused him great annoyance, because of the charges of heresy brought against the work, which he, like David Oppenheimer, had endorsed without reading. In Berlin his brother-in-law Michael Ḥasid succeeded him.
