= Mining district (Europe) =

A mining district in the European context denotes a specific geographically defined area under the control and administration of a single mining authority. This district includes the mines, saltworks and smelters located within it.

== Regional names ==
In the former Holy Roman Empire and in German-speaking countries today, various terms were used including Bergrevier, often shortened to Revier, Bergamtsrevier, Bergdistrict, Bergamtsbezirk, or Bergwerksdistrikt.

== Background and history ==
Until the Middle Ages, mining in Europe was only practised on a small scale. There were relatively few mines that were subordinated directly to their respective sovereigns. Their administration was instead carried out by an official appointed by the sovereign on his or her behalf. Mining was regulated by the applicable mining ordinances in the respective states. When mining increased in scope and more and more mines were built, it was no longer possible for a single person to manage the mines. For this reason, in countries where mining was carried out, the operations were divided into several smaller mining districts. Each individual district was under its own mining office, which was only responsible for its assigned mining district. The head of each mining district was the Bergmeister ("Master Miner"). The town which was home to the headquarters of the mining authority was the so-called Hauptbergstadt ("main mining town") of the mining area. Sometimes several mining districts combined formed a major mining district, the Hauptbergwerksdistrikt or Oberbergamtdistrikt, which was subordinate to the Higher Mining Office (Oberbergamt). The overall head of mining operations in this case was the Berghauptmann ("mining captain"). In countries where there were very many mines, there were several higher mining authorities (Oberbergämter), each of which had its own district. These higher authorities were in turn subordinate to the responsible ministry of state.

== Size ==
The size of a mining district is regulated differently depending on the country. There are countries in which the geographical location is decisive for the size of the individual mining districts. In other countries, such as Austria, the size of the mining district was dependent on the number of mines and the size of their mining areas (Bergreviere). Here, the mining authority determines the number of mines per mining area in agreement with the mining operators involved. The size of a mining area was not always fixed. Changes within the respective mining districts could lead to changes in the demarcations of the associated mining areas. It sometimes happened that two previously independent mining districts were combined into a new, larger mining district. It was also possible that parts of another mining district from another country were assigned to a particular mining district.

== Naming ==
Each mountain district is assigned a specific name. As a rule, the individual districts were named after the main mining town within it. For example the Bergrevier Wetzlar, or the Freiberger Bergrevier. However, sometimes they were named after a region such as e.g. the Ruhr mining district, which retained its name, even though the main mining activities took place north of the Emscher. It was also possible for mining districts to be renamed, e.g . the Bergrevier St. Goar was renamed Bergrevier Coblenz II. If districts were combined, the newly formed mining district also received a new name. This might consist of the names of the merged districts, as with the merger of the Brühl and Unkel mining districts to form the Brühl-Unkel mining district.

== Literature ==
- Hans Grothe, Hermann Franke, ed. (1962), "Lexikon des Bergbaus", Lueger Lexikon der Technik, vol. Band 4 Bergbau (4th fully revised and expanded ed.), Stuttgart: Deutsche Verlags-Anstalt, p. 431
- Günther Beck (2010), "Die Bildung von Bergrevieren in der Salzwirtschaft (dargestellt an Beispielen aus Mitteleuropa)", in Wolfgang Ingenhaeff, Johann Bair (ed.), Bergbau und Berggeschrey. Zu den Ursprüngen europäischer Bergwerke (8. Internationaler Montanhistorischer Kongress Schwaz / Sterzing 2009), Hall in Tirol/Vienna: Berenkamp, pp. 39–58, ISBN 978-3-85093-262-2
