= Regalia =

Term for the formal dress of a monarch

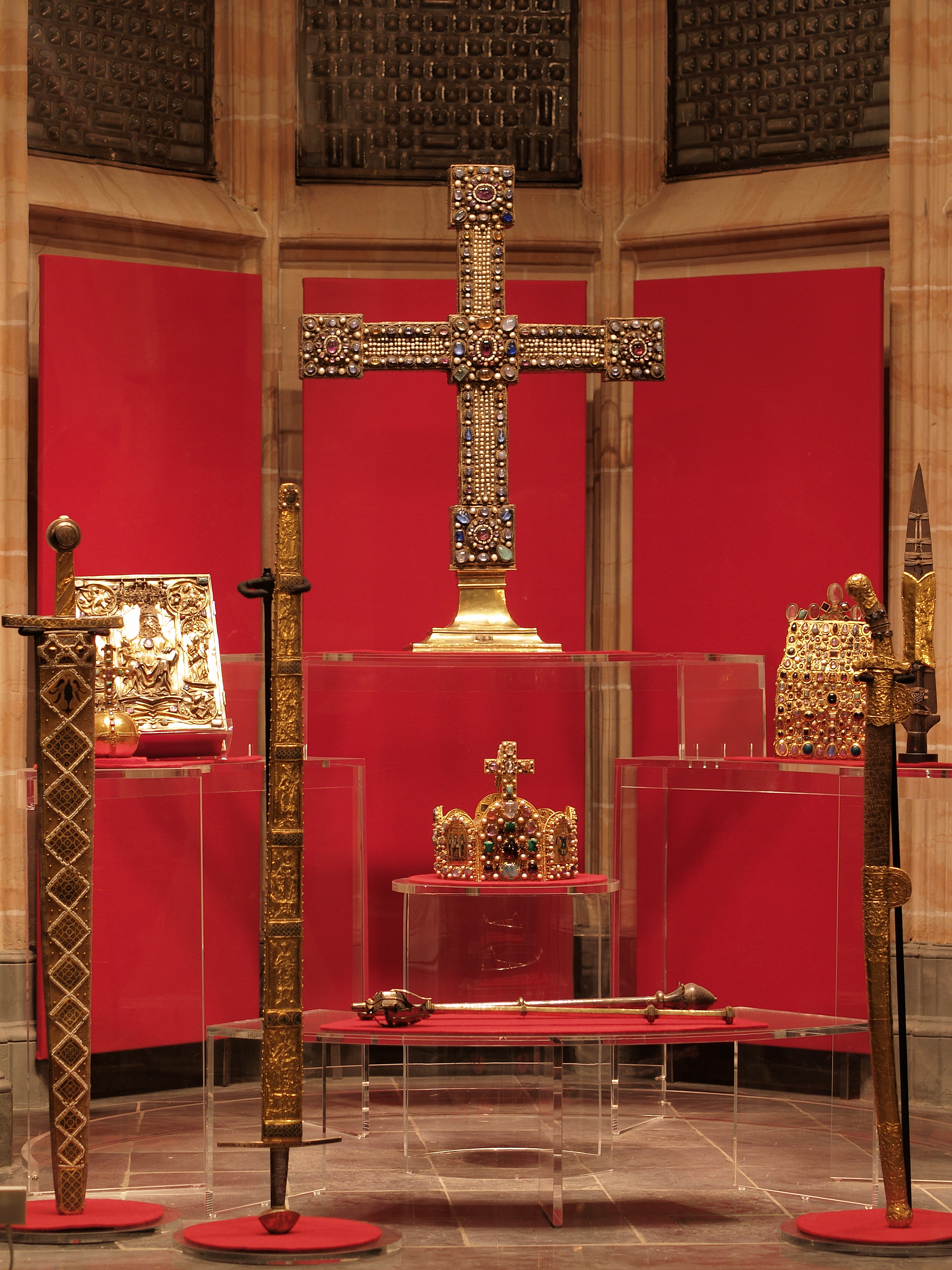
Replicas of the Imperial Regalia of the Holy Roman Empire, symbolizing the translatio imperii and the authority of the emperors, displayed in the Aachen Town Hall, Germany

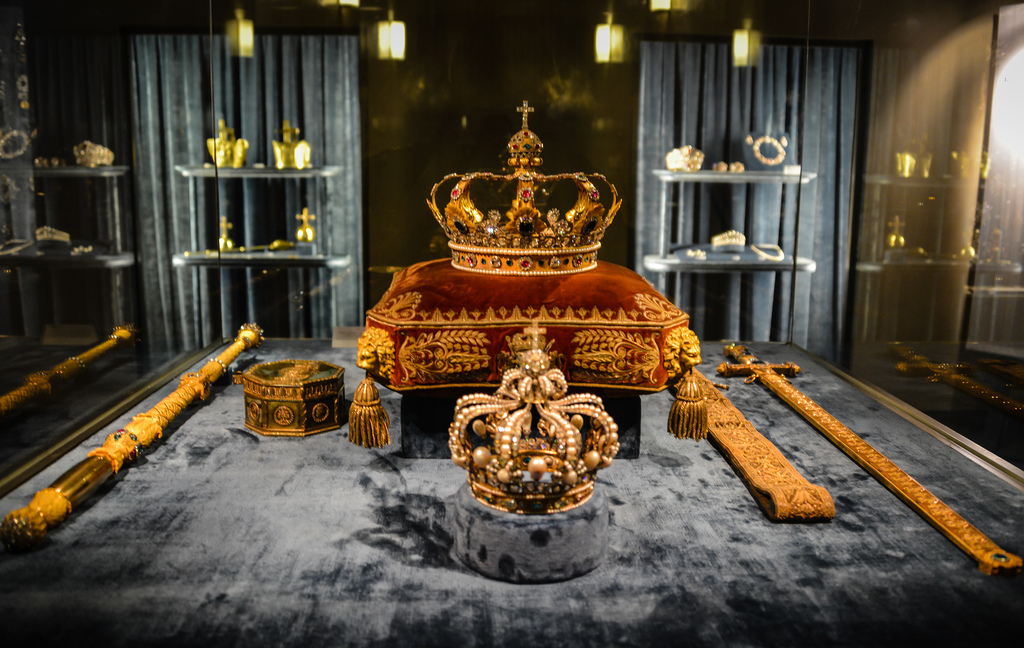
Regalia of the past kings of Bavaria, Residenz Palace treasury, Munich

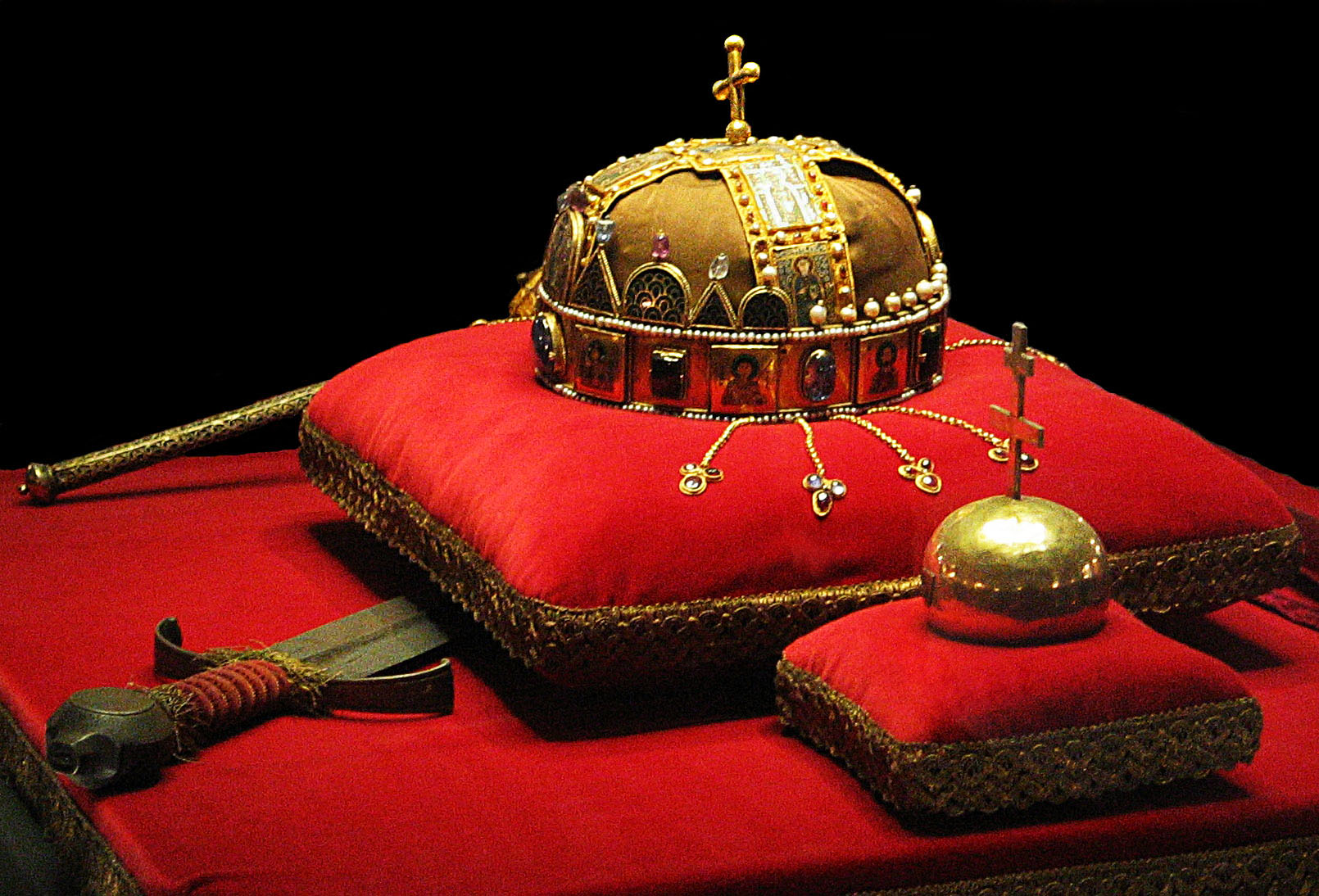
The Holy Crown of Hungary along with other regalia.

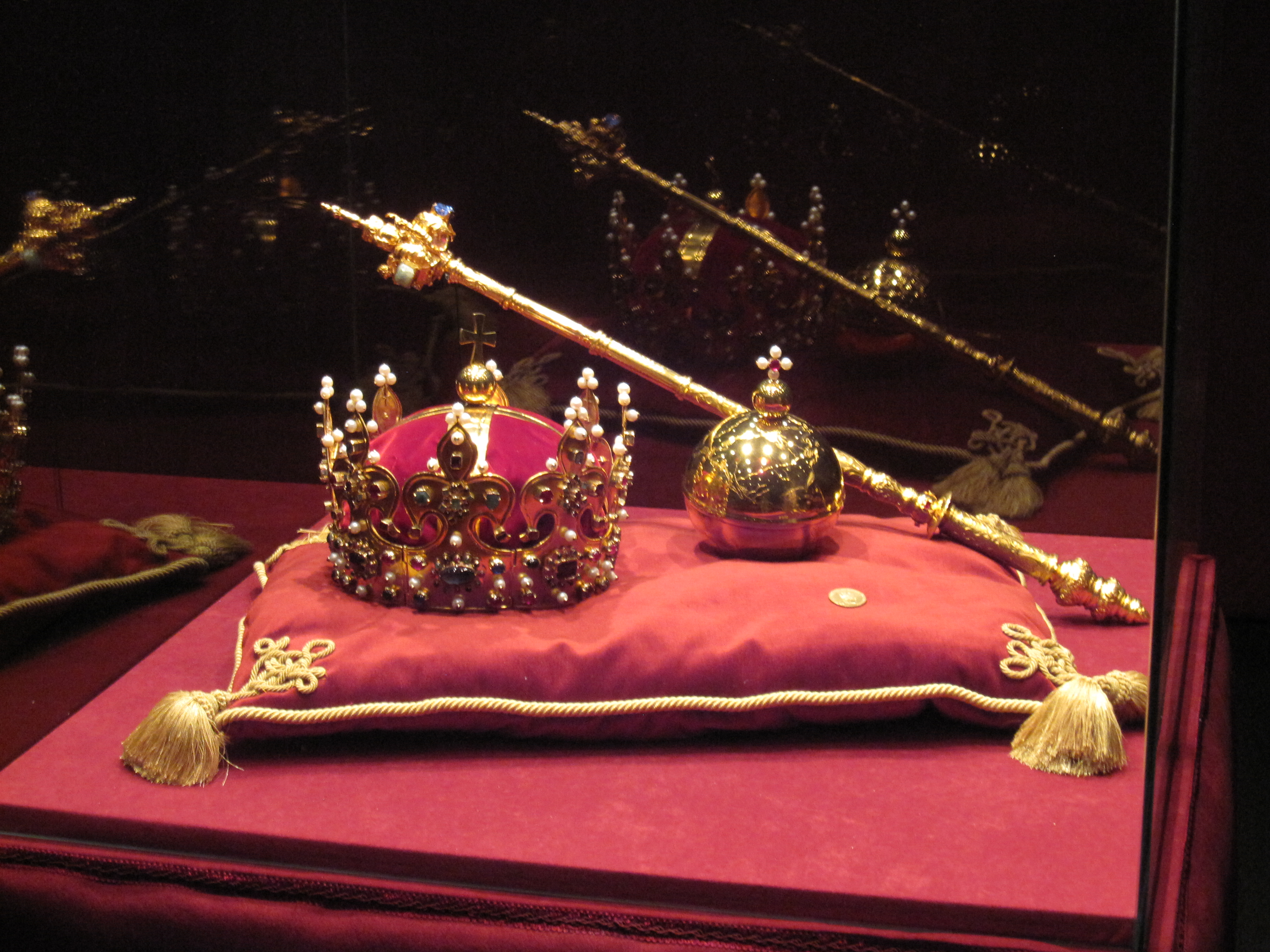
Replicas of the Crown of Bolesław I the Brave and other regalia.

Regalia (/rəˈɡeɪliə, -ˈɡeɪljə/ rə-GAY-lee-ə, -GAYL-yə) is the set of emblems, symbols, or paraphernalia indicative of royal status, as well as rights, prerogatives and privileges enjoyed by a sovereign, regardless of title. The word originally referred to the elaborate formal dress and accessories of a sovereign, but now it also refers to any type of elaborate formal dress. The word stems from the Latin substantivation of the adjective regalis, "regal", itself from rex, "king". It is sometimes used in the singular, regale. (Note: As in the Upper Harz Water Regale, a royal right granted for use of water resources in the Harz mountains of Germany.)

== In the abstract ==
The term can refer to the rights, prerogatives, and privileges that are held exclusively by any sovereign, regardless of title (emperor, grand duke, etc.). An example of that is the right to mint coins, and especially coins that bear one's own effigy. In many cases, especially in feudal societies and generally weak states, such rights have in time been eroded by grants to, or usurpations by, lesser vassals.

== Royal dress, accessories, and associated pomp ==
Some emblems, symbols, or paraphernalia possessed by rulers are a visual representation of imperial, royal, or sovereign status. Some are shared with divinities, either to symbolize a god(ess)'s role as, say, king of the Pantheon (e.g. Brahman's scepter) or to allow mortal royalty to resemble, identify with, or link to, a divinity.

The term "crown jewels" is commonly used to refer to regalia items that are designed to lend luster to occasions such as coronations. They feature some combination of precious materials, artistic merit, and symbolic or historical value. Crown jewels may have been designated at the start of a dynasty, accumulated through many years of tradition, or sent as tangible recognition of legitimacy by some leader such as the pope to an emperor or caliph.

Each culture, even each monarchy and dynasty within one culture, may have its own historical traditions, and some even have a specific name for its regalia, or at least for an important subset, such as:

- The Honours of Scotland
- The Nigerian Royal Regalia
- The Three Sacred Treasures of the Emperor of Japan
- The Imperial Regalia of the emperors and kings of the Holy Roman Empire
- The French Crown Regalia

But some elements occur in many traditions.

=== Headgear ===
- Crowns and variations (diadem, tiara)
- Cap of Maintenance

=== Other regal dress and jewelry ===
- Armills—bracelets
- Ermine coronation mantle
- Gloves
- Barmi (Бармы) or barmas, a detachable silk collar with medallions of precious material sewn to it, as used in Moscovy
- Rings, symbolizing the monarch's "marriage" to the state (in the case of the Doge of the Republic of Venice, to its lifeblood, the sea); or as a signet-ring, a practical attribute of his power to command legally

=== Hand-held symbols of power ===
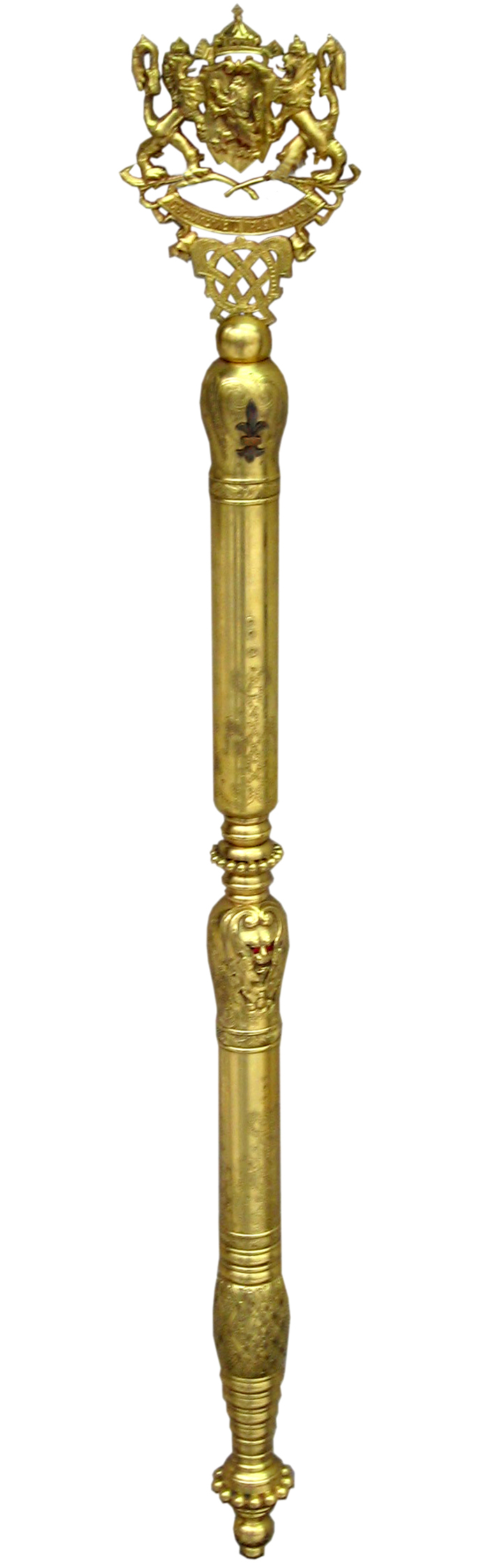
The Royal Scepter of Boris III of Bulgaria

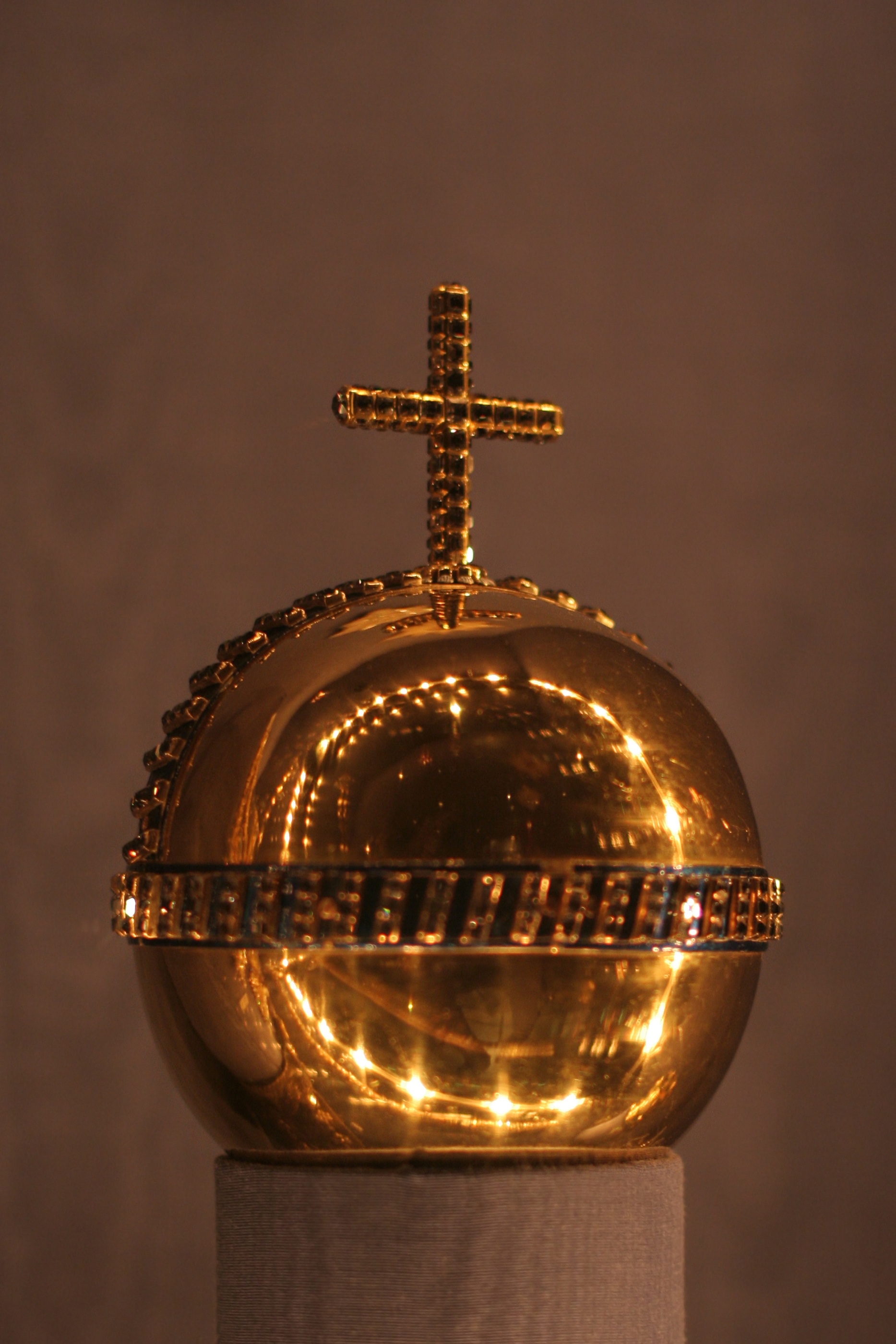
Danish globus cruciger. Part of the Danish Crown Regalia.

- Orb (globus cruciger)
- Scepter, including the French Hand of Justice
- Mace
- Sword - for examples, see Sword of Justice; Sword of State; Sword of Mercy (known also as Edward the Confessor's Sword)
- Other weapons, such as a dagger (as in Arabian and Indian traditions), a spear, or a royal kris (in Malay traditions)
- Crook and flail
- Fly-whisk; In Japan, it is said to have some of the power of Amaterasu.
- Seals, such as the Heirloom Seal of the Realm, represented imperial authority under the Mandate of Heaven in China.
- Knobkerrie

=== Other hand-held symbols ===
Regalia can also stand for other attributes or virtues, i.e. what is expected from the holder.

Thus the Imperial Regalia of Japan (Japanese: 三種の神器, romanized: Sanshu no Jingi, or "Three Sacred Treasures"), also known as the Three Sacred Treasures of Japan as follows:

- The sword, Kusanagi (草薙剣) (or possibly a replica of the original; located at Atsuta Shrine in Nagoya) represents valor
- The jewel or necklace of jewels, Yasakani no magatama (八尺瓊曲玉; at Kokyo in Tokyo), represents benevolence
- The mirror, Yata no kagami (八咫鏡), located in the Ise Shrine in Mie Prefecture, represents wisdom

Since 690, the presentation of these items to the emperor by the priests at the shrine are a central part of the imperial enthronement ceremony. As this ceremony is not public, the regalia are by tradition only seen by the emperor and certain priests, and no known photographs or drawings exist.

=== Coronation paraphernalia ===
Some regalia objects are presented and/or used in the formal ceremony of enthronement/coronation. They can be associated with an office or court sinecure (cfr. archoffices) that enjoys the privilege to carry, present and/or use it at the august occasion, and sometimes on other formal occasions, such as a royal funeral.

Such objects, with or without intrinsic symbolism, can include

- Anointing utensils:
  - Sacred ampulla containing the ointment.
  - Spoon for the same ointment.
  - Alternatively, the monarchies of Norway and Sweden have an anointment horn.
- A Bible used for swearing in the monarch as the new sovereign.
- Cage with a bird (wren) for wren hunting in Celtic ceremonies.
- Coronation stone e.g. Stone of Scone or Lia Fáil.

=== Companions' attributes ===
Apart from the sovereign himself, attributes (especially a crown) can be used for close relatives who are allowed to share in the pomp. For example, in Norway, the queen consort and the crown prince are the only other members of the royal family to possess these attributes and share in the sovereign's royal symbolism.

=== Reserved color ===
In the Roman Empire, the color Tyrian purple, produced with an extremely expensive Mediterranean mollusk extract, was in principle reserved for the imperial court. The use of this dye was extended to various dignitaries, such as members of the Roman Senate, who wore stripes of Tyrian purple on their white togas, for whom the term purpuratus was coined as a high aulic distinction.

In late imperial China, the color yellow was reserved for the emperor, as it had a multitude of meanings. Yellow was a symbol of gold, and thus wealth and power, and since it was also the color that symbolized the center in Chinese cosmology (the five elements, or wu xing(五行)), it was the perfect way to refer to the emperor, who was always in the center of the universe. Consequently, peasants and noblemen alike were forbidden to wear robes made entirely out of yellow, although they were allowed to use the color sparingly.

=== Additional display ===
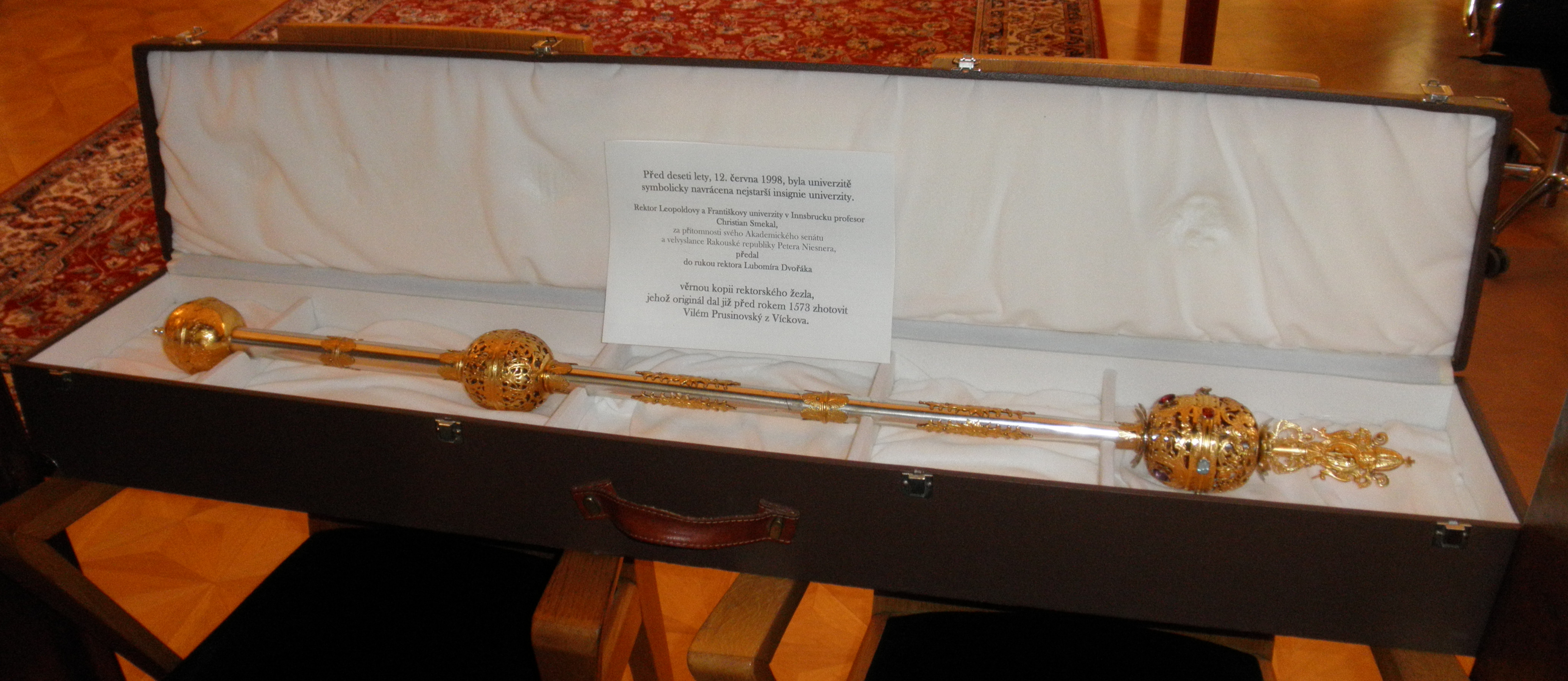
Copy of University of Olomouc rector's mace

- Umbrella / canopy
- Fan(s)
- Standard(s)
- Mace(s)
- Music, such as
  - A fanfare or other specific piece of music
  - Reserved instruments, such as silver trumpets, or in India (especially Mewar) the Nakkara drum
  - The ceremonial Nobat orchestra is a formal requirement for a valid Malaysian coronation.

== Non-royal regalia ==
=== Republics ===
In republics, the presidential sash, common especially in Latin American countries but appearing elsewhere in the world as well, has a role similar to that of royal regalia: distinguishing the head of state.

=== Academic regalia ===
Academic dress is a traditional form of clothing for academic settings, primarily tertiary (and sometimes secondary) education, worn mainly by those who have been admitted to a university degree (or similar), or hold a status that entitles them to assume them (e.g., undergraduate students at certain old universities). It is also known as academicals and, in the United States, as academic regalia.

=== Other regalia ===
Another example of non-royal regalia is the traditional dress that is worn by Native American peoples in the United States, and First Nations peoples in Canada for ceremonial purposes, such as powwow and hoop dancing.

== Gallery ==
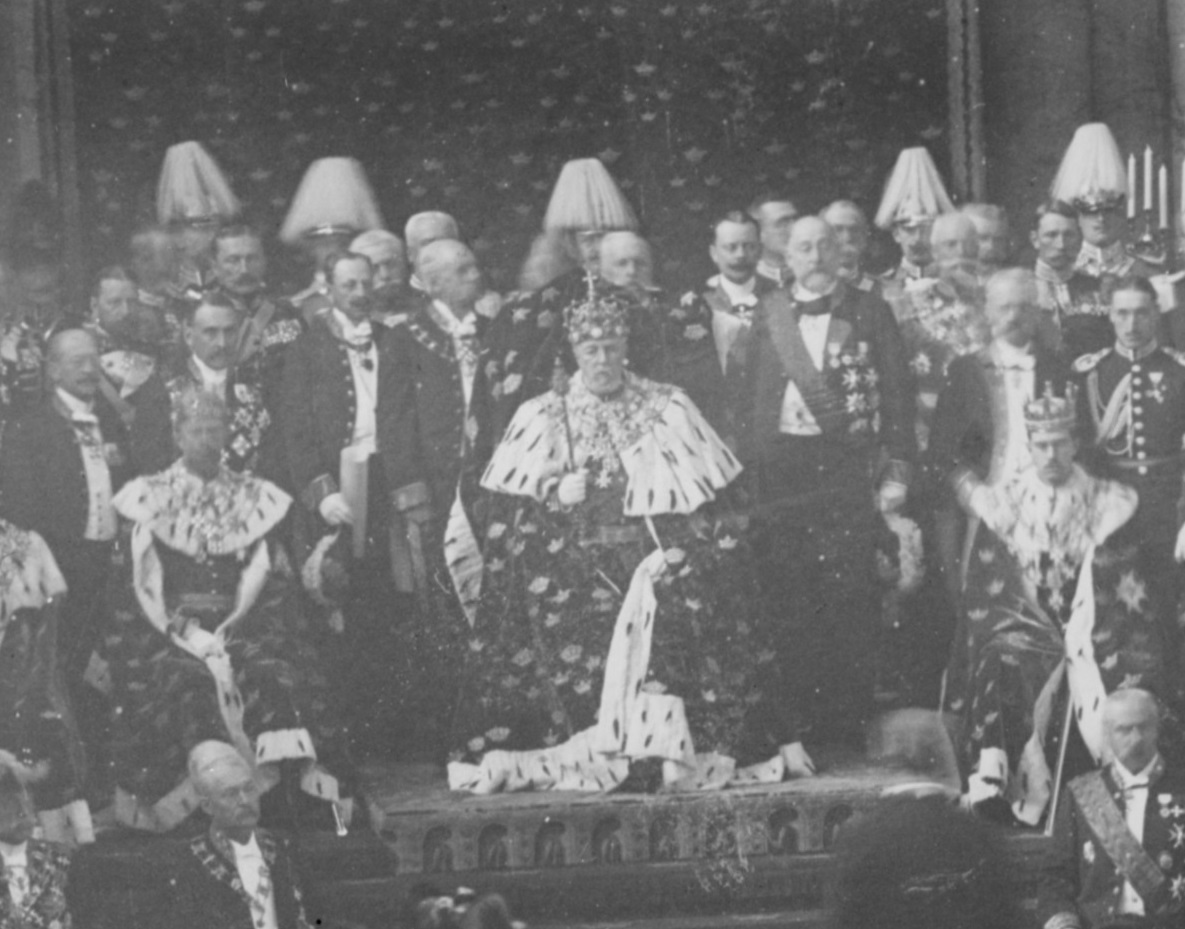
King Oscar II of Sweden, Crown Prince Gustaf (V), and Prince Gustaf (VI) Adolf wearing their crowns and coronets, c. 1900

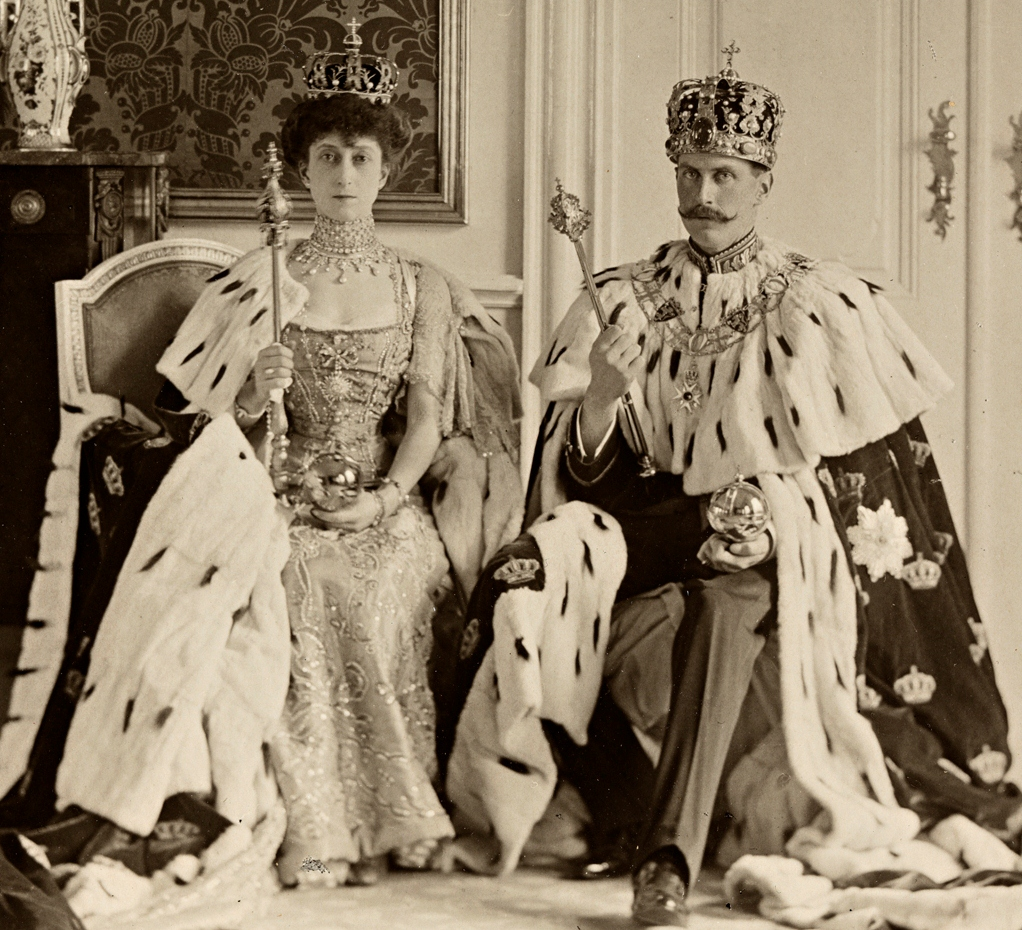
King Haakon VII and Queen Maud of Norway with their regalia in 1906

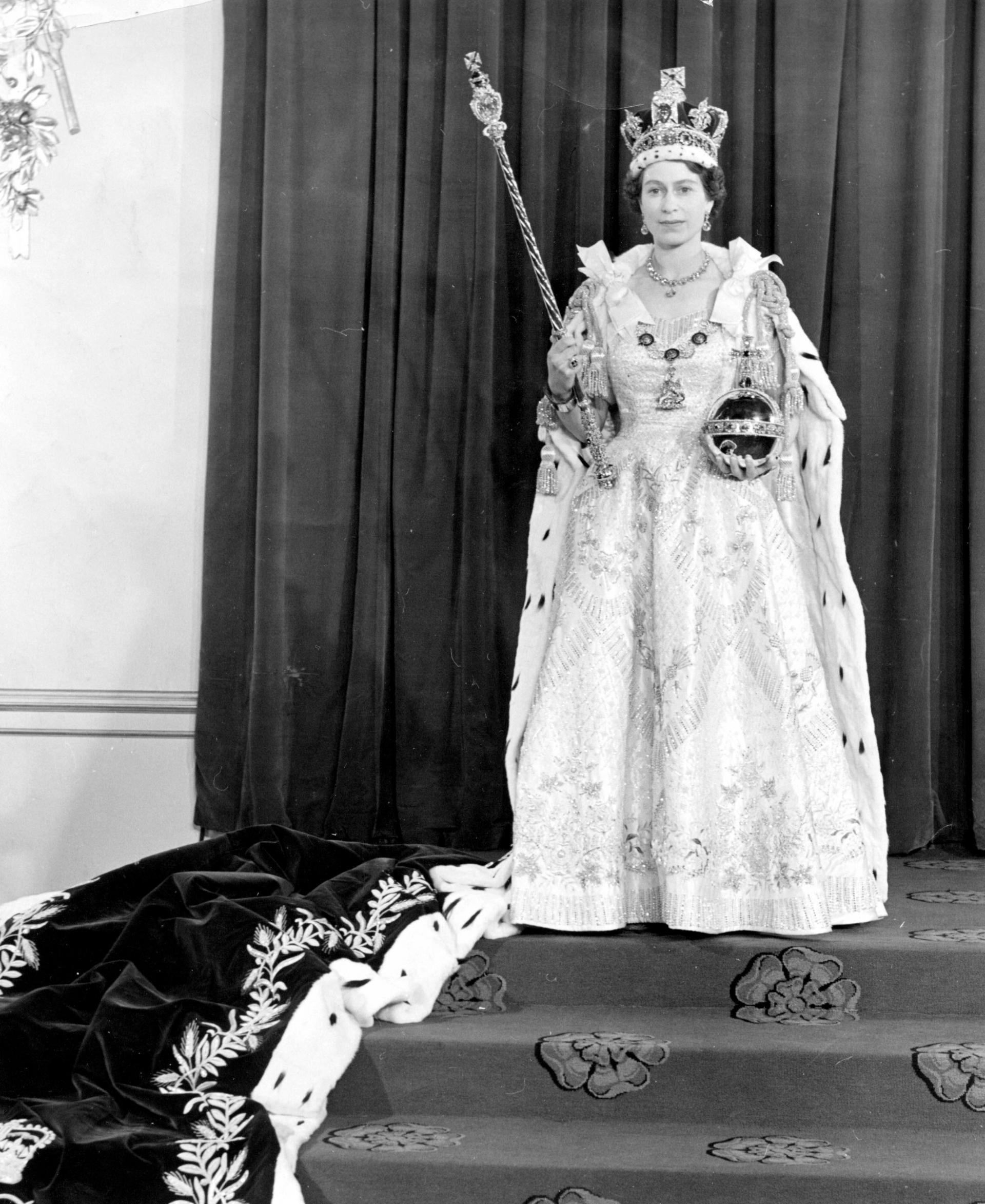
Queen Elizabeth II with her regalia, 1953

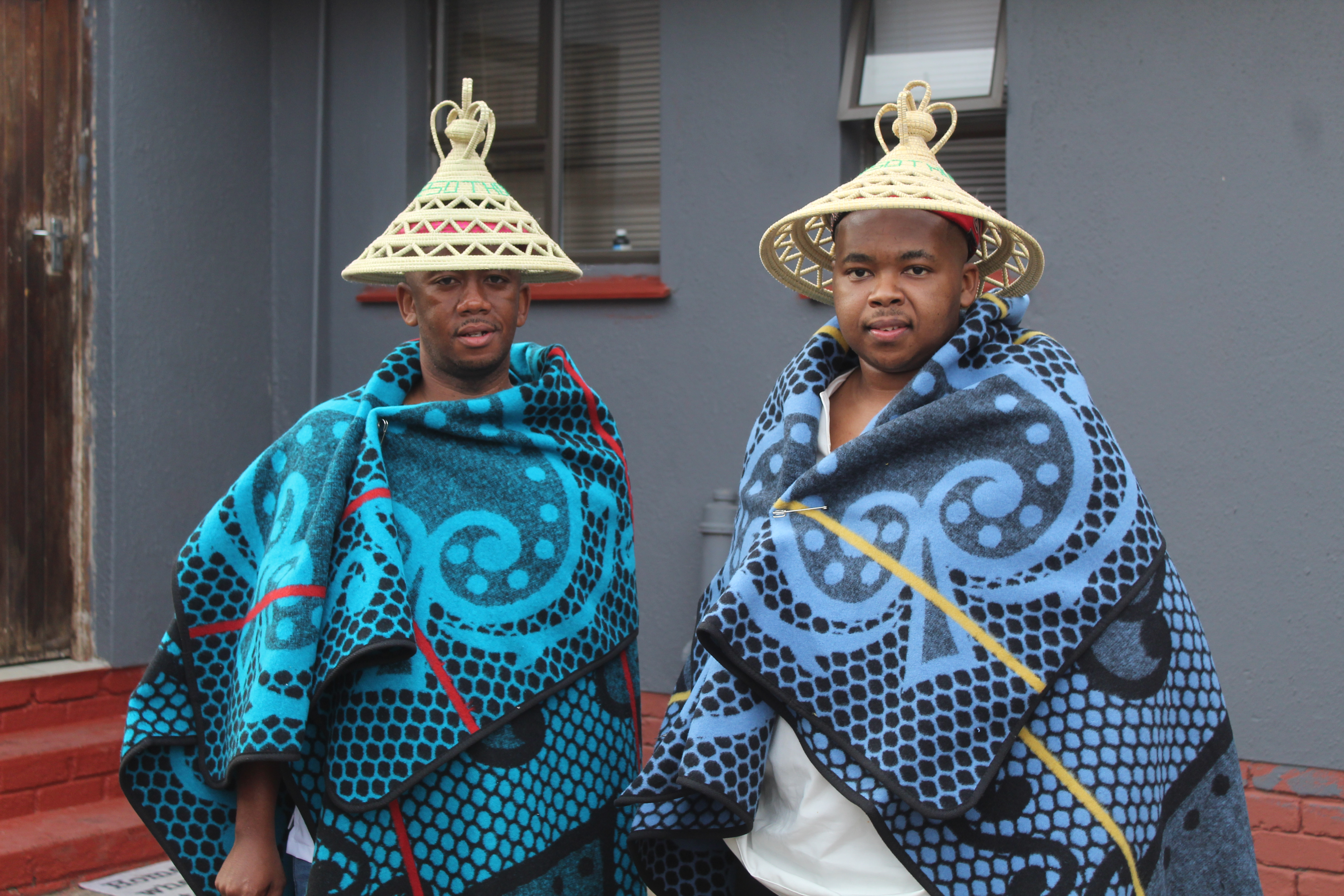
Sotho regalia in South Africa

== See also ==
- Bergregal
- Crown jewels
- Jura regalia
- Papal regalia and insignia
- Regalia of Norway
- Regalia of Sweden
- Regalia of the Russian tsars
- Right of coinage in the Holy Roman Empire
- Royal Family
- Throne
