= Bergamt =

Mining authority in German-speaking countries

A Bergamt or mining office is a mining supervisory authority in German-speaking countries below the level of the state. It exercises immediate supervision of all activities, facilities and equipment associated with mining within a mining district. This includes the promotion and monitoring of operational safety and workplace safety.

== Germany ==
In Germany, the legal basis for the supervision of mining operations is the Federal Mining Act (Bundesberggesetz). The states are responsible for the execution of the act through their respective state authorities which are:

- Freiburg Regional Authority (Regierungspräsidium Freiburg) for Baden-Württemberg
- North Bavaria Mining Office (Bergamt Nordbayern) and South Bavaria Mining Office (Bergamt Südbayern) for Bavaria
- State Office of Mining, Geology and Raw Materials (Landesamt für Bergbau, Geologie und Rohstoffe) for Berlin and Brandenburg
- State Office of Mining, Energy and Geology (Landesamt für Bergbau, Energie und Geologie) for Bremen, Hamburg, Lower Saxony and Schleswig-Holstein
- Darmstadt (Regierungspräsidium Darmstadt), Gießen (Regierungspräsidium Gießen) and Kassel (Regierungspräsidium Kassel) regional authorities for Hesse
- Stralsund Mining Office (Bergamt Stralsund) for Mecklenburg-Western Pomerania
- Arnsberg Regional Authority (Bezirksregierung Arnsberg), office in Dortmund, previously Landesoberbergamt Nordrhein-Westfalen in Dortmund
- State Office of Geology and Mining (Landesamt für Geologie und Bergbau) for Rhineland-Palatinate
- Saarbrücken Mining Office (Bergamt Saarbrücken), subordinate to the Head Mining Office of the Saar (Oberbergamt des Saarlandes)
- Saxon Mining Office (Sächsisches Oberbergamt) for Saxony
- State Office of Geology and Mining (Landesamt für Geologie und Bergwesen) for Saxony-Anhalt
- Thuringian State Mining Office (Thüringer Landesbergamt) for Thuringia

== Austria ==
In Austria it used to be the Berghauptmannschaft until the Mineral Raw Material Act came into force on 1 January 1999, when that was replaced by the Montanbehörden.

== Netherlands ==
In the Netherlands, state supervision of mining is carried out by the Staatstoezicht op de Mijnen (SodM). An important role is its oversight of oil extraction in the North Sea.

== Regional Mining Offices ==
- Bergamt Kamen

== Historic Mining Offices ==
- Bergamt Hamm

== See also ==
- Bergordnung
- Bergrecht
- Bergregal
- Saxon Mining Office
- Mining in the Harz
