= Jost Liebmann =

- Born: c. 1639
- Resting place: Jüdischer Friedhof Berlin-Mitte
- Children: Reisel Benjamin Wolff

Jost Liebmann (c. 1639 – 30 January 1702) was a court Jew and court jeweller of Elector Frederick III of Brandenburg (King Frederick I of Prussia), and one of the leaders of the Jewish community of Berlin.

== Early life ==
Originally from Göttingen, Liebmann arrived in Berlin following his marriage to Esther, the widow of court Jew Israel Aaron of Konigsberg, whose position he inherited. He was a relative of Leffmann Behren, the financial agent of the Duke of Hanover. His first wife, who died young, was Malka, the daughter of Court Jew Samuel Hameln. He was chief rabbi starting in 1685 and controlled the jewel trade in Berlin.

His wealth and standing at the court enabled him to exercise great influence in the early period of the Jewish congregation. He acquired the privilege of having his own synagogue, to which he appointed as rabbi his nephew and son-in-law, Aaron ben Benjamin Wolf. Due to his differences with Marcus Magnus, court Jew of the crown prince, the congregation was split into two factions, and after his death the quarrel was continued by his widow and his sons Israel and Liebmann Jost. Among his numerous descendants are the brothers Giacomo Meyerbeer, and Michael and Wilhelm Beer.
