= Jacob Abraham (medalist) =

German sculptor

- Born: 1723; Strelitz, Duchy of Mecklenburg-Strelitz, Holy Roman Empire
- Died: 17 July 1800 (aged 76–77); Berlin, Kingdom of Prussia
- Family: Abraham Abramson (son)

Jacob Abraham (Abram) (1723, Strelitz – 17 June 1800, Berlin) was a German Jewish medalist and lapidary.

He learned the art of engraving at the age of thirteen from a workman in the Polish town of Lissa. On the death of his father in 1731 the family moved to Schwerin (Sverin) and then to Mecklenburg. In 1750 he married Beilcheh Minden, the daughter of a teacher. His talents were recognised by Frederick the Great, who confirmed his appointment at the Berlin mint as a die cutter in 1752 after a two-year apprenticeship. The following year, at the age of 31, he was transferred to Stettin as Royal Medalist to inaugurate a new mint. He also engraved small coins and Polish money before moving to Königsberg in 1755.

Abraham fled before the Russian advance in the Seven Years' War to Danzig in 1758, Dresden in 1759 and Berlin in 1761. He worked at both the Neue Münze ("New Mint") and Berlin Alte Münze ("Old Mint"). In the last twenty years of his life his powers declined and much of his work was done collaboratively with his son Abraham Abramson. On his death in 1800, he was, most unusually, granted full civil rights, and laid to rest at the Hamburg Street Cemetery, Berlin with many tributes.

== Work ==
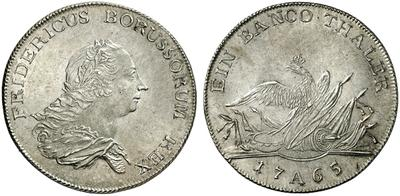
1765 coin with engraving by Abraham, depicting Frederick the Great

Soon after arriving in Berlin, Abraham cut a new Prussian eagle for the thaler. He struck medals in honour of Frederick's military successes, such as the one commemorating the victory at Torgau, in 1760, cut from Ramler's model and Meil's design. He also created a medal containing the effigy of Prince Potemkin and the fortress of Otchakov: Otschakovia Expugnata, and one struck in commemoration of the Jubilee festival of the French community in Berlin, 10 June 1772, from the design of D. Chodowiecki. Another of his successful medals was one representing Heinrich Sigismund von der Heyde, the defender of Kolberg, 1760.

He also created the famous medal of Moses Mendelssohn, in which the portraiture is the work of the son, and the marriage medal of George III.
