= Esther Liebmann =

German financier (1649-1714)

Esther Liebmann (née Schulhoff; 1649 – 15 April 1714) was a German financier. In Berlin, she served as court Jew to King Friedrich I of Prussia, inheriting the title and also the Münzregal from her second husband, Jehuda Jost "Judah Berlin" Berlin, also known as Jost Liebmann. She was the widow of Israel Aaron of Konigsberg.

When her first husband died, she faced financial challenges. Upon her second marriage, in lieu of a dowry, she offered her contacts to Frederick I of Prussia and her right to live in Berlin.

She served as court jeweler, assisting the king in obtaining a large collection of gems and jewelry. When her husband was living, the couple worked together and were some of the most well-to-do Jews in Berlin. After Liebmann's husband's death in 1701, she carried on their business. Because the royal family owed her an extensive amount of the jewels and gems she supplied, she was given the right to begin minting official coinage for the crown.

In her lifetime, she was known as the most powerful woman in the country. After the death of her royal patron, Frederick I, her fortune waned, and her debt remained unpaid after her death in 1714.
