= Mining law =

Branch of law relating to the legal requirements affecting minerals and mining

Mining law is the branch of law relating to the legal requirements affecting minerals and mining. Mining law covers several basic topics, including the ownership of the mineral resource and who can work them. Mining is also affected by various regulations regarding the health and safety of miners, as well as the environmental impact of mining. This article covers the mining laws in select German-speaking countries, English-speaking countries, French-speaking countries, Spanish-speaking countries, and Portuguese-speaking countries.

== Topics ==
=== Ownership ===
An aspect of property law that is central to mining law is the question of who "owns" the mineral, such that they may legally extract it from the earth. This is often dependent on the type of mineral in question, the mining history of the jurisdiction, as well as the general background legal tradition and its treatment of property.

For instance, in many jurisdictions, rights to mine gold and silver are retained by the sovereign, as the two metals traditionally served as currency in many a given society.

=== Support ===
In addition to ownership of the mineral, the method of extraction may affect nearby property owners. Subsidence (be it dramatic or subtle) results when a mine (or similar area) collapses or drops, causing above or nearby structures to drop with it, often damaging or destroying them. The issue of support rights determines the legal rights and relationships between parties in these situations.

== By country ==
Mining law varies both by the legal tradition of the jurisdiction, as well as the individual jurisdiction.

=== Mining law in German-speaking countries ===
Mining law in Europe originated from medieval common law. From at least the 12th century, German kings claimed mining rights to silver and other metals, taking precedence over the local lords. But by the late Middle Ages, mining rights, known as the Bergregal were transferred from the king to territorial rulers. Initially, mining rights were granted orally or in writing by individuals. From the early 15th century, mining law was enacted by territorial rulers in the form of decrees or regulations (mining regulations or Bergordnungen), which often remained in force until the 19th century. A new, far-reaching, legal basis was created with the General Mining Act for the Prussian States of 1865 (Allgemeines Berggesetz für die Preußischen Staaten von 1865), which, with local variations, was adopted in Brunswick (1867), Bavaria (1869), Württemberg (1874), Baden (1890) and other countries. With the exception of the Kingdom of Saxony, where a similarly important legal statute, the General Mining Act of the Kingdom of Saxony (Allgemeines Berggesetz für das Königreich Sachsen) came into force on 16 June 1868, it became law in all the larger states of Germany.

==== Today ====
- In Germany, under Article 74 (1) no. 11 of the Basic Law Basic Law, mining law is subject to concurrent legislation. The central legal standard is the Federal Mining Act (Bundesberggesetz).
- In Austria the legal basis is quite similar to German law. The primary legislation since 1 January 1999 has been the Mineral Raw Material Act (Mineralrohstoffgesetz) or MinroG.
- In Switzerland mining law is a cantonal business and governed by cantonal law.
- Mining law in Liechtenstein is restricted to just a few minerals (metallic ores, fossil fuels and related materials like graphite, anthracite, stone coal, lignite, slate coal, asphalt, bitumen and mineral oils, sulphur, rock salt and salt springs) and governed mainly by the Liechtenstein Property Act, articles 484 to 497. As in Switzerland mining in Liechtenstein is no longer important and the regulations in the property act are largely only procedural regulations.

=== Mining law in English-speaking countries ===
Unlike German mining law, in Great Britain and the Commonwealth the principle of mining by landowners prevails. The crown only lays claim to gold and silver reserves. In exceptional cases (e.g. where land ownership is divided) mining rights may be given to a third party, whereby the landowners have to be compensated. The mining company pays the landowner a lease, dead rent or a royalty. The rights to above- and below-ground minerals (as a rule quarries and mines) may be awarded separately. One exception among Commonwealth common law countries is Australian mining law, under which virtually all mineral rights are held by the Crown.

Mining law in the United States is also based on English common law. Here the landowner is likewise the owner of all raw materials to unlimited depth. However, the state retains rights over phosphate, nitrate, potassium salts, asphalt, coal, oil shale and sulphur, and a right of appropriation (not ownership) by the state for oil and gas. Sand and gravel come under the Department of the Interior.

=== Mining law in French-speaking countries ===
In France and Belgium the Code civil is the basis for mining law.

=== Mining law in Spanish-speaking countries ===
==== Colombia ====
In Colombia, mining is regulated by the Natural Resources Code and Law 685 of 2001 (Mining Code). Under the Political Constitution, all natural resources and the subsoil belong to the State. Therefore, mining activities require concession contracts granted through objective rounds administered by the National Mining Agency (ANM). Prior consultation with ethnic and indigenous minorities is required before exploration and production begins. Environmental licensing is required for specific activities, and mining is prohibited in protected areas. The National Environmental Licensing Authority (ANLA) regulates environmental licenses, while Regional Autonomous Corporations oversee sanctioning procedures under Law 1333 of 2009. The Ministry of Mines and Energy holds general direction and regulation of mining activities in Colombia.

==== Ecuador ====
Mining law in Ecuador is an extensive framework regarding ownership and the due process for extracting the subsoil minerals. It has an extensive history, ranging all the way back beyond the colonial period, when it was mostly small-scale artisanal mining from indigenous communities. 2008 is when the last major change was made in the constitution to Ecuador's mining laws

===== Summary of legal framework =====
The precedent for Ecuador's mining law comes from the country's constitution, established in 2008, which coined the first ever use of "Rights of Nature". It sets up a system that perceives nature much like how the indigenous peoples viewed nature, it being like a mother. as stated, the ecuadorian government aimed to give nature the rights to "exist, persist, and regenerate". This system mainly posits the environments rights alongside human rights. Ecuador's government has a branch called the Ministry of the Environment, whose sole duty is to oversee protected areas and determine which areas are suitable for mining. Part of their duties includes periodic inspections to determine if projects are following all guidelines for proper extraction. Its defined in the constitution that all minerals are owned by the Ecuadorian government, asserting that all decisions made surrounding the extraction and use of minerals are to be made in correspondence with the government of Ecuador.

===== History =====
- pre-colonial and early colonial
  - In 1753, the Spanish Crown put one of the first known laws/regulations surrounding mining law, which much like, declared that all resources found in Ecuador belonged to the crown. They were deemed to have full ownership when it came to mines in Ecuador.
- Nineteenth century
  - Other than declarations made by a monarchy, what was considered to be the first law by modern standards was enacted in 1830. It was created in favor of mining, promoting measures that eased apprehensions at the time, as well as clearing any misconceptions. it was done to garner more public support for the establishment of extractive practises. later on we find that ecuador enacts a code that was first introduced by the chilean government, in 1886. This code posits that private owners were then able to develop land and expand their practices further than the reach of the government. land was awarded to those who first discovered the area, and they held stipulations that meant said person could only hold the land if they were actively developing and mining on it.
- Twentieth century
  - This era is where more laws are discussed and put into place. In 1929, it was ratified in the constitution that not just private ownership was allowed, but also foreign investment. This had mixed opinions even back then. It was understood that most Ecuadorians wanted to keep land ownership within the state for its citizens; others welcomed the foreign investment by means of creating jobs and infrastructure.
- Twenty-first century
  - In the modern era, much of what was put in place since the late twentieth century maintains relevance; however, there were major additions to the constitution set in 2008. The government introduced a new law surrounding mining practices that put stricter regulations on mining companies and foreign investors. However, it was changed in 2015 to make Ecuador more appealing to foreign investors and to generate more cash flow for the state. They did this by lowering taxes on corporations and reducing the windfall tax on mining companies.

==== Chile ====
===== Overview =====
In Chile, all mineral deposits are owned by the state. These deposits include guano, metalliferous sands, salt, coal, hydrocarbon, and other fossil fuels. The Ministerio de Minería (Ministry of Mining) controls mining activities in the country. While the state has ownership of all mineral deposits, it has the authority to grant mining concessions, which authorize private exploitation of mineral deposits.

In the 1990s, when President Patricio Aylwin came into power, the state largely kept the same mining legal framework. The previously established 1983 Mining Code provided laws for obtaining mining concessions, and, along with the Chilean constitution, allowed foreign investors to acquire concessions. By keeping the same statutes and codes, the state maintained the integration of the private sector into mining.

Chile's mining laws have been oriented towards the markets since before its era of democracy, when it was a dictatorship under President Augusto Pinochet. At this point, Chile's constitution situated the country's economy towards the extraction of its natural resources; as Cordero & Valenzuela describe it, "extractive constitutionalism." Even as the country transitioned towards a more democratic doctrine in the '90s, the changes that were being attempted to implement would take time to be institutionalized. In the end, Chilean politicians made very few changes to the country's mining laws. Some political conflict has emerged which revolved around a move to increase mining taxation. Nem Singh says this increased desire to have state involvement in the mining sector is an example of neoliberalism. The Chilean Right argued against the increased tax rates, pointing out that the higher taxation may dissuade foreign mining firms from investing in Chile, and they may decrease the country's competitiveness because of its previously low tax rates, which the country relied on to remain competitive. Nem Singh's 2010 paper Reconstituting the Neostructuralist State: the political economy of continuity and change in Chilean mining policy highlights the concept "neostructuralism," defining Chile's post-dictatorship politics as such. This concept characterizes the state's prioritization of growth and mining profits, and its assertion over natural resources through increased taxes on mining as neostructuralism.

===== Mining Legal Framework =====
Chile's 1980 constitution states that the state has "absolute, exclusive, inalienable and imprescriptible domain" over all mineral deposits. The state has the right to issue concessions to private entities to exploit the land for mining. The state may decide this through the courts, and the entity that is issued the concession must adhere to all relevant prescribed laws. For land with deposits that do not fall under the category open to concession (see Overview), the state may explore and exploit the land itself, as it sees fit. Mining concessions entail not only the mineral which is to be extracted, but the land needed for facilities like processing plants, tailings dams, waste dump deposits, leach pads, camp sites, air strips, etc.

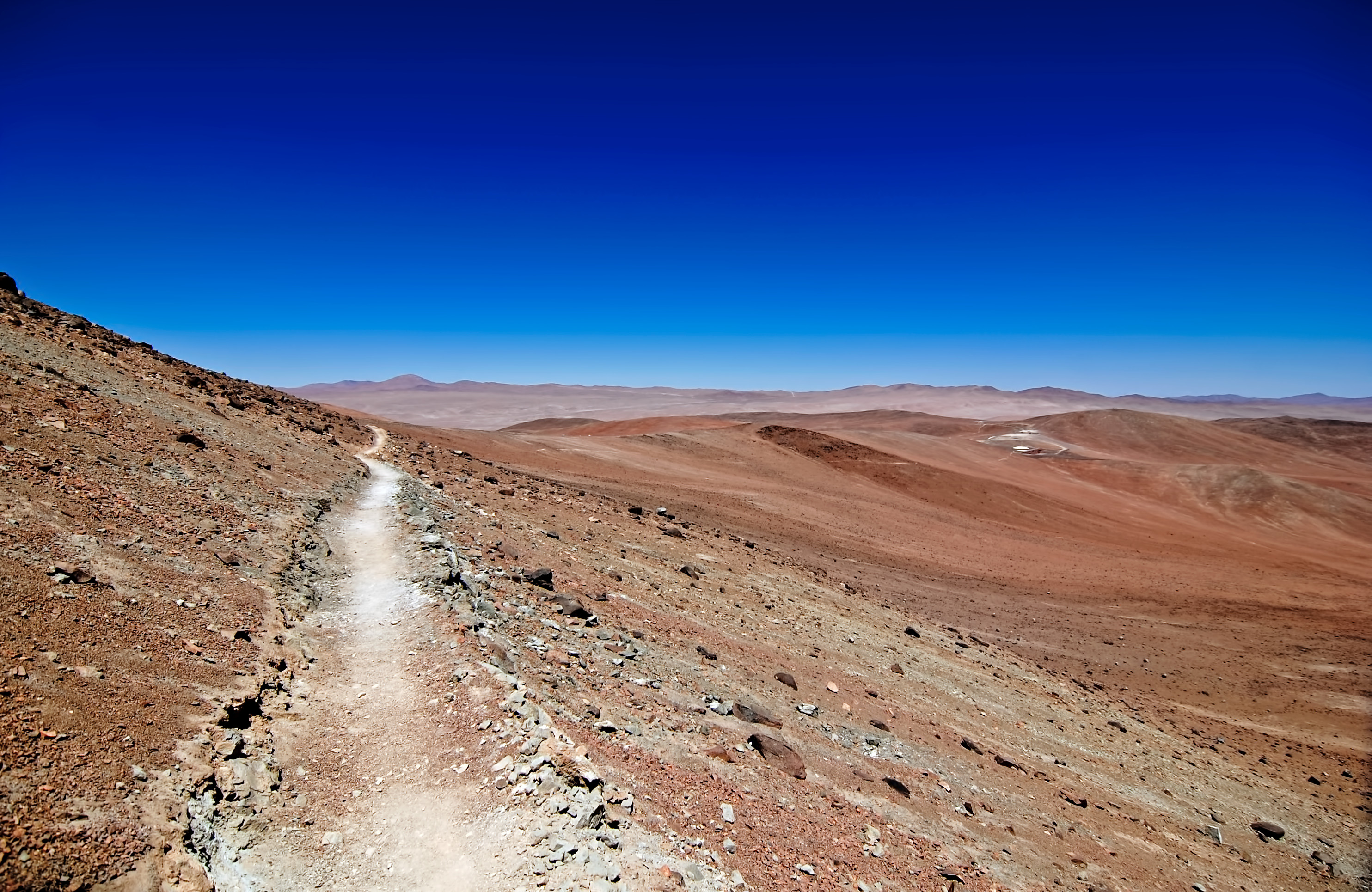
The Atacama Desert is the traditional territory of the Likanantaí people.

===== Indigenous Communities and Mining =====
As lithium becomes an increasingly important resource, Chile has become a crucial provider of the metal for the world. One of the regions with major deposits is Chile's Atacama Desert, which also harbors the Likanantaí, one of its remaining Indigenous communities. This has created conflict over land and resource use. To these people, the approximately 500,000 gallons needed to mine one ton of lithium is considered sacrilege. Water is sacred to them, and, to the Likanantaí, the adverse effects experienced far outweigh the minimal gains they receive from foreign investors mining on their territory.

Legal questions have arisen around this expansion of lithium mining, regarding the consultation and participation of the Likanantaí in decisions about the use of their land for mining. There is debate about Chile's mining laws and how the country can balance land use for mining and Indigenous rights effectively.

Chile's largest gold mine, Pascua-Lama, owned by Canada-based Barrick Gold, is a separate case also involving indigenous communities and mining. In 2018, the project was shut down by the Superintendency of the Environment and had to pay an $11.5 million fine for environmental infractions, but was sent back to Environmental Court by Chile's Supreme Court in 2019. The process for affected communities or individuals to mobilize their rights, in cases like these, involves noticing a right has been violated (naming), finding the party responsible (blaming), and seeking justice for the violation (claiming). "Naming, blaming, and claiming" can seem intimidating for people or communities, though, who are not as legally conscious, or are not as well-versed in legal meanings and rights. In some cases, those whose rights are violated do not realize they have been violated, or do not seek legal action as they have less social status, or cannot afford it. Wedemier-Allan argues that, while the Chilean government is and should be available for indigenous communities to seek legal recognition and justice, there ought to be other solutions besides relying solely on policymakers to change laws.

=== Mining law in Portuguese-Speaking Countries ===
==== Brazil ====
Mining law in Brazil was started with the Brazilian Mining Code of 1967. Brazilian mining law is currently being discussed and proposed in the government for making changes.

===== Enacted Legal Framework =====
The Brazilian Mining Code is arguably one of the most important pieces of legislation for the country's ability to regulate mining and their economy of natural resources. This large piece of legislation essentially regulates everything to do with mining in the country including land rights, safety and legal requirements, and defines criteria for exploring and building mining areas and what to do with mineral deposits.

The National Mining Agency (ANM) of Brazil was created in 2017 as a way to introduce reforms to this sector of the economy. This organization was set up to be an autonomous regulator for this industry for the first time in over 60 years as well as making sure resources are managed somewhat sustainably.

The Mining and Development Program (PMD) in Brazil was started in part through the help of the ANM to develop a plan for the three years following the COVID-19 pandemic. Many of the rules added through the PMD were previously established in other places, but were absent from Brazilian law. One such development included increasing dam safety and inspection processes.

===== Indigenous Land Use =====
The 1973 "Indian Statute" of Brazil essentially permitted taking land from Indigenous populations in order to protect their national interest or national security by exploiting the subsoil for minerals. Ten years after this, it was clarified by the government that only mechanized mining will be used on Indigenous soil according to the interests of Indigenous people and heritage; this opened up even more land to mining, including that of the Yanomami people. With current research on both legal and illegal mining, approximately 20% (450,000 km^{2}) of Indigenous land has been endangered in Brazil and about 30 rivers in the Amazon have been polluted by this mining.

One of the biggest environmental threats that results from mining is the global biodiversity crisis being exacerbated through deforestation in the Amazon and illegal mining on Indigenous lands both by people inside and outside of the Amazonian indigenous tribes. While deforestation may seem like a separate issue from illegal mining, in order to establish the infrastructure and supply chains necessary for a large-scale mining company, massive vegetation loss and wild land loss occurs. This is exacerbated by the chemicals used in the refining process which also promotes native vegetation loss surrounding these areas.

===== Mining Disasters =====
The Samarco Corporation owned a large mine-tailing dam which collapsed in 2015 in Brazil and generated a wave of toxic mud that flowed down the Doce River and ultimately killed 20 people alongside destroying hundreds of kilometers of riparian lands in Brazil. The authors estimated the total cost of this disaster to be much higher than the fine the company was charged by the Brazilian government. In fact, it has been shown that generally speaking the environmental externalities of mining companies in Brazil are negative, meaning they are actively harming the environment by staying directly on the threshold of legality in terms of following mining law.

== See also ==
- Bergamt - German mining office
- Bergregal - Medieval mining rights and royalties
- Bergordnung - German mining regulations
- Energy law
- Mine closure
- Mining law and governance in Chile
- Mining act
- General Mining Act of 1872 (United States)
- Minerals and Mining Law of 1986 (Ghana)
- Environmental impact assessment
- Mining in Brazil

== Literature ==
- Reinhart Piens, Hans-Wolfgang Schulte, Stephan Graf Vitzthum: Bundesberggesetz. (BBergG). Kommentar. Kohlhammer Verlag, Stuttgart, 1983, ISBN 3-17-007505-5.
- Raimund Willecke: Die Deutsche Berggesetzgebung. Von den Anfängen bis zur Gegenwart. Glückauf, Essen, 1977, ISBN 3-7739-0210-7.
- Eduard Kremer, Peter U. Neuhaus gen. Wever: Bergrecht. Kohlhammer Verlag, Stuttgart, u. a. 2001, ISBN 3-17-016287-X.
- Julius Hesemann et al.: Untersuchung und Bewertung von Lagerstätten der Erze, nutzbarer Minerale und Gesteine (= Vademecum 1). Geologisches Landesamt Nordrhein-Westfalen, Krefeld, 1981, pp. 95–105: Abschnitt: Rechtsverhältnisse (Berggesetzgebung).
