= Right of coinage in the Holy Roman Empire =

The right of coinage in the Holy Roman Empire (in German Münzregal) was one of the so-called regalia (also called royal privileges or sovereign rights). It consisted of the right to issue regulations governing the production and use of coins. It covered the specification of currency, the right to mint and the right to use coins and the profit from minting. It is variously referred to in English sources as the "right of coinage", "coinage regality", "regality of coinage", "minting privileges" and "coinage prerogative".

== History ==
In imitation of Ancient Rome the Frankish crown was, since Charlemagne, a strongly centralized government and this included the right of coinage. The royal administration was also responsible for the construction and operation of the mints, the standard of coinage, and the coinage.

With the sharp upturn in the economy from the 9th century, the right of coinage, often connected with customs and market rights, was delegated to ecclesiastical rulers, mainly bishops. From the 11th century, it was also granted to secular princes, and later to towns and cities.

With the Golden Bull of 1356 the right of coinage and the often closely associated mining rights or Bergregal were transferred to the prince electors. In 1648, other imperial estates (Reichsstände) were granted the right of coinage. Nevertheless, the sovereignty over coinage officially remained with the Holy Roman Emperor.

== See also ==
- Regalia
- Carolingian system of coinage
- Minting rights

== Literature ==
- Arnold Luschin von Ebengreuth: Allgemeine Münzkunde und Geldgeschichte des Mittelalters und der neueren Zeit. 2nd widely printed edition. Oldenbourg, Munich, inter alia, 1926 (Handbuch der mittelalterlichen und neueren Geschichte. Abt. 4: Hilfswissenschaften und Altertümer 5), (Unaltered reprographic copy: ib. 1969).
- Friedrich von Schrötter: Wörterbuch der Münzkunde. 2nd unaltered edition. de Gruyter, Berlin, 1970.
- Peter Volz: Königliche Münzhoheit und Münzprivilegium im Karolingischen Reich und die Entwicklung in der sächsischen und fränkischen Zeit. Teil I: Die karolingische Zeit. In: Jahrbuch für Numismatik und Geldgeschichte. 21, ISSN 0075-2711, pp. 157–186.
