= Bergordnung =

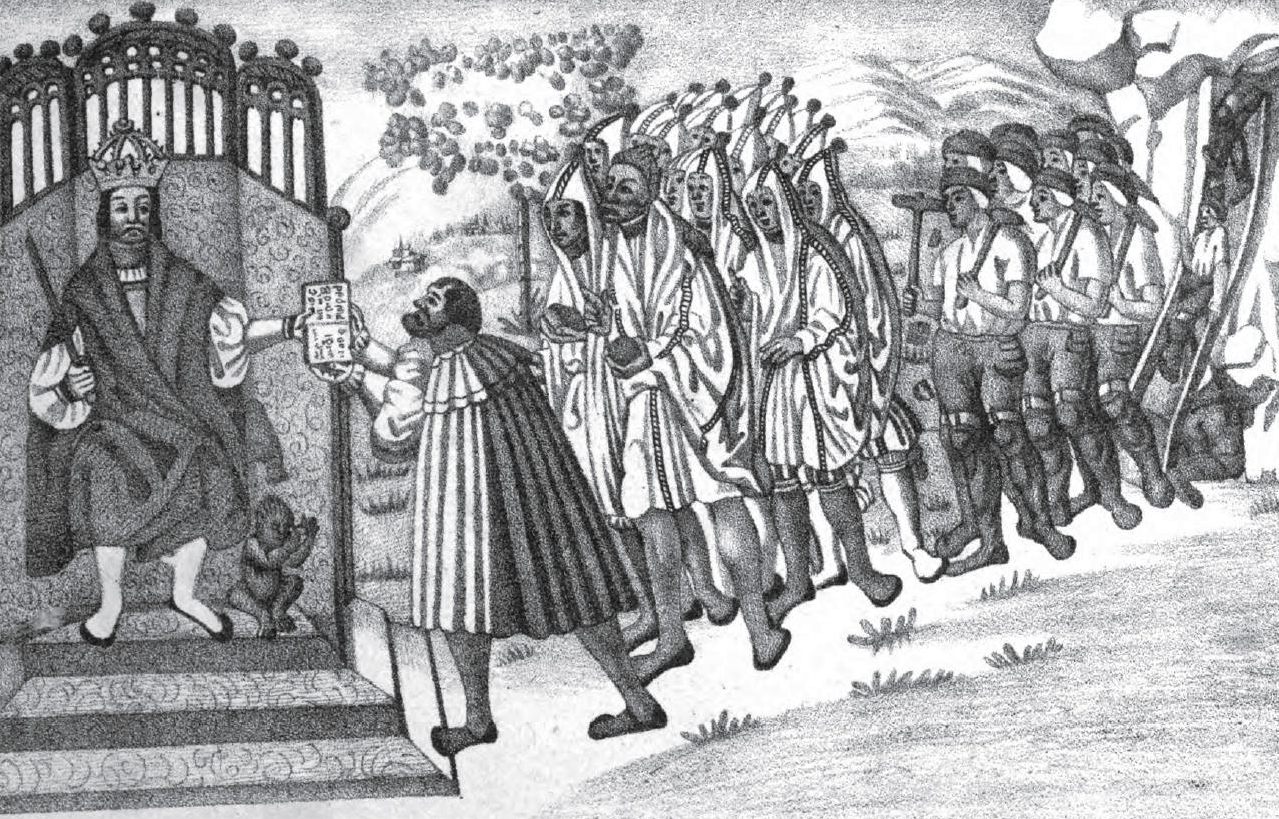
King Wencelaus II issues the Kuttenberg mine with its regulations or Bergordnung.

The Bergordnung were the mining regulations or law enacted in order to exercise the royal mining rights or Bergregal in central Europe in medieval times.

== See also ==
- Bergrecht
- Bergregal

== Literature ==
- Hermann Brassert (ed.): Berg-Ordnungen der preussischen Lande., Cologne, 1858 (digitalised)
- Hubert Ermisch: Das Sächsische Bergrecht des Mittelalters. Giesecke & Devrient, Leipzig, 1887 (digitalised)
- Franz Johann Friedrich Meyer: Versuch einer Geschichte der Bergwerksverfassung und der Bergrechte des Harzes im Mittelalter. Eisenach, 1817
- Joseph von Sperges: Tyrolische Bergwerksgeschichte. Wien 1765 (digitalised)
- Aemil Steinbeck: Geschichte des Schlesischen Bergaues, seiner Verfassung, seines Betriebes. 2 Bände, Breslau 1857ff. (digitalised Vol. 1)
- Kaspar Maria von Sternberg: Umrisse einer Geschichte des Bergbaus und der Berggesetzgebung des Königreichs Böhmen. 2 volumes, Prague, 1836/38
  - digitalised Vol. 1-1
  - digitalised Vol. 1-2
  - digitalised Vol. 2
- Thomas von Wagner: Über die Chursächsische Bergwerksverfassung. Leipzig, 1787 (digitalised)
