= List of European Jewish nobility =

== Austrian ==
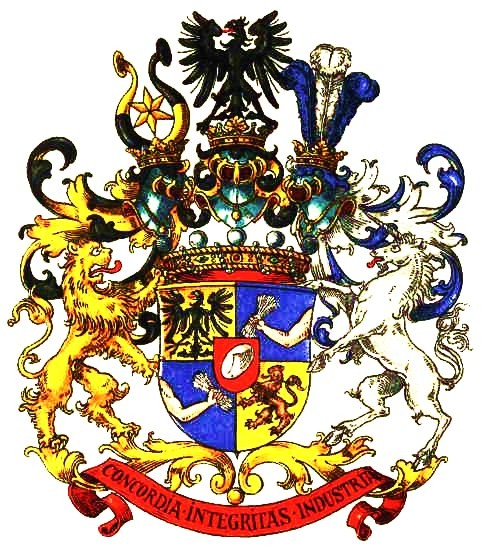
Coat of arms of the Rothschild family, granted in 1822 by the Habsburg College of Heralds. It contains a clenched fist with five arrows, symbolizing the branches established by the five sons of Mayer Rothschild. The family motto appears below the shield: Concordia, Integritas, Industria (Harmony, Integrity, Industry).

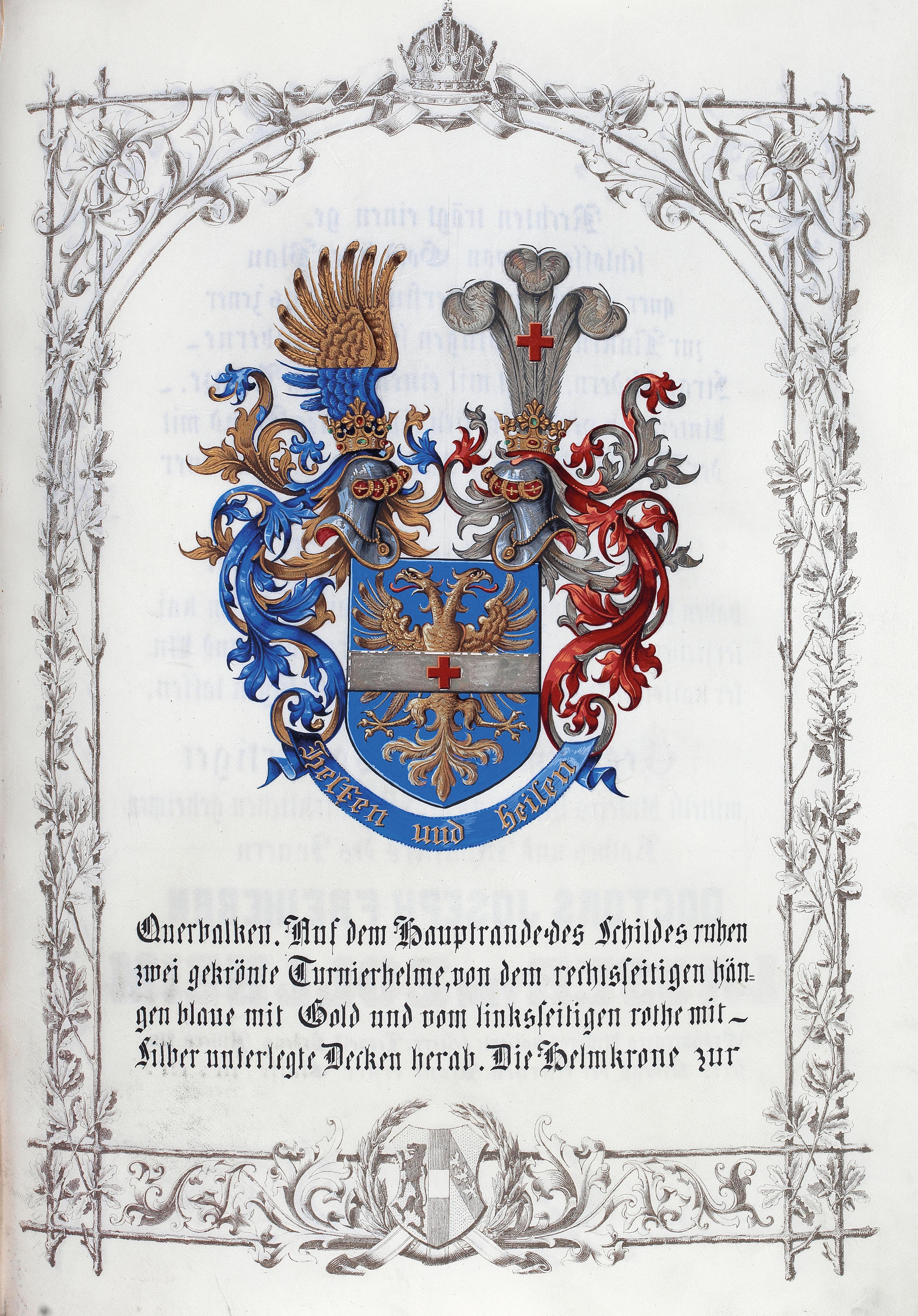
Coat of arms of Leopold von Seligmann, 1874

- von Arnstein, Arnsteiner
- von Biedermann
- von Auspitz
- Bloch von Blochhaimb
- von Brunicki
- Elkan von Elkansberg (later Bavaria)
- von Ephrussi
- von Eskeles
- Ritter von Fischer
- von Fould-Springer
- Frydman, Ritter von Prawy (cf. Marcel Prawy)
- von Goldschmidt
- von Goldberg
  - Armand von Goldberg
- von Gomperz
- Ritter Grab von Hermannswörth
- von Greiffenberg
- von Gutmann (cf. Elisabeth von Gutmann), Gutmann von Gelse und Belišće
- Haber von Lindsberg
- Josef von Halban
- von Heine-Geldern, Heine von Geldern (Freiherr & Baron, Gustav, Robert)
- von Henikstein (Hönigstein)
- Herz Ritter von Hertenried
- Hofmann von Hofmannsthal
- Joel von Joelson
- von Lieben
- von Löwenthal
- von Katzellenbourg
- von Königswarter
- von Mises
  - Ludwig von Mises, economist
  - Richard von Mises
- von Motesiczky
- de Morpurgo
- Ofenheim von Ponteuxin
- von Oppenheim
- Parente
- Porges - von Portheim
- Reinach
- von Rosenberg-Redé
- Rothschild banking family of Austria
- von Seligmann
- von Sonnenfels (converted out)
- von Todesco
- Wartenegg
- von Wertheimstein
- Weil von Weilen
- Wiener von Welten
- von Wittgenstein (converted out)
  - Paul Wittgenstein
  - Ludwig Wittgenstein
- von Zemlinsky

== Belgian ==
- Baron (hereditary Mongolian title) Alexander Zanzer
- Baron François Englert
- Baron Henich Apfelbaum
- Baron Henri Goldberg, president of the Auschwitz Foundation
- Baron Lambert
- Baron Jacques Brotchi
- Baron Julien Klener
- Baroness Regina Suchowolski-Sluszny
- Francisco de Silva y Solis (Marquis de Montfort): Military commander under Emperor Leopold I; greatly aided in the defeat of the French François de Créquy in 1675. He settled in Antwerp as a professed Jew.

== Czech ==
- Jacob Bassevi
- Bloch von Blochhaimb

== Dutch ==
- Lopes Suasso: family whose nobility was confirmed between 1818 and 1831, extinct in 1970 (notable member: Francisco Lopes Suasso, Baron d'Avernas le Gras (1657–1710), one of the leading shareholders of the West India Company, one of the most ardent supporters of the House of Orange, he supported William of Orange in 1688, in his invasion of England)
- Salvador: family members ennobled in 1821, extinct 1975
- Teixeira de Mattos: family members ennobled between 1817 and 1892 (to which family belongs the non noble translator Alexander Teixeira de Mattos)
- Goldman, Jonkheer.

== French ==
- de Koenigswarter Baron Jules de Koenigswarter
- Cahen d'Anvers
- Rothschild banking family of France

== German ==
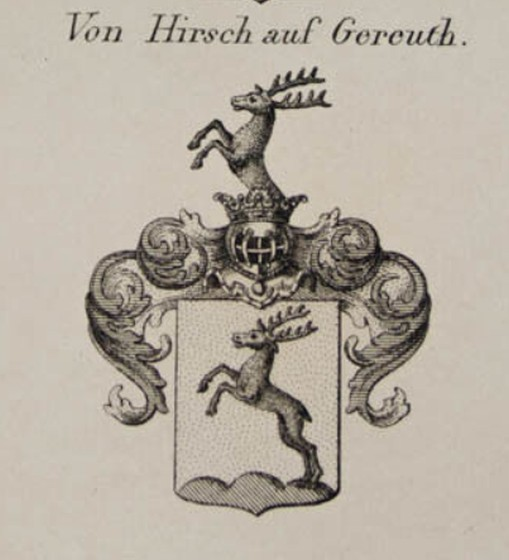
Coat of arms of the Hirsch auf Gereuth family.

Between 1819 and 1900, a number of titles were conferred on Jews. Of a sample of 700 German nobles created during this period, 62 were Jewish.

- Auerbach
- Bleichröder
- Collen/Cölln
- Diane von Fürstenberg (née Halfin)
  - Prince Alexander von Fürstenberg
    - Talita von Fürstenberg
  - Princess Tatiana von Fürstenberg
- Gil
- Goldschmidt-Rothschild
- Hecht
- Hess
- Hirsch auf Gereuth
- Kaulla
- Oppenheim
  - Baroness Karin von Ullmann (née Oppenheim)
    - Baron Georg von Ullmann
    - Countess Ilona von Krockow
- Puttkamer
  - Baroness Gertrud von Puttkamer (née Günther)
- Reinach
- Reuter
- Rotbert
- Rothschild
- Schwarzau (originally de Suasso)
- Seligmann
  - Aron Elias Seligmann, Freiherr von Eichthal
- Stein
  - Aviel Justice Stein (commonly known as Avi Stein)
- Strauss
- Weinberg
  - Carl von Weinberg
- Weißmann

== Hungarian ==
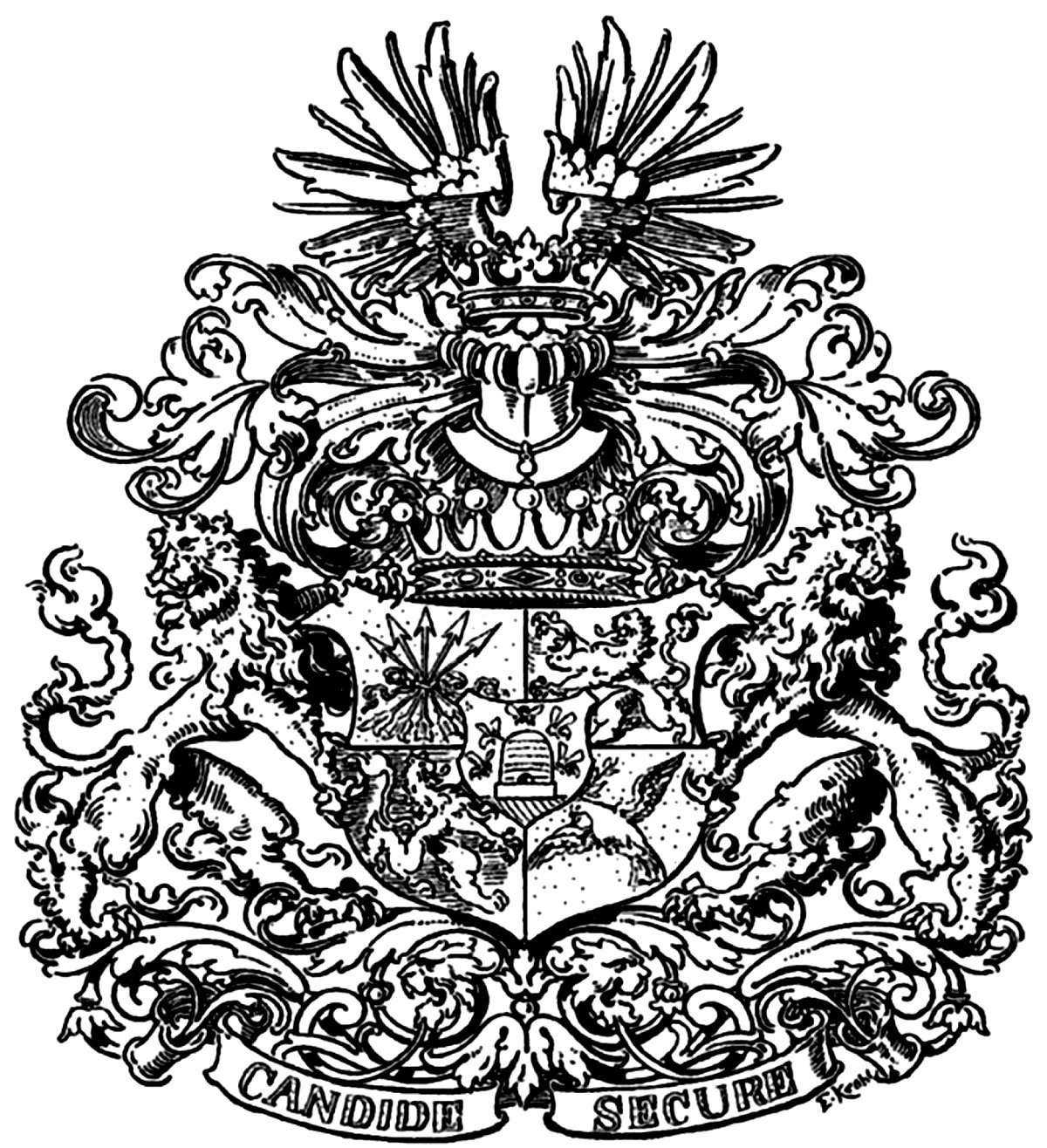
Coat of arms of the Königswarter family.

- Biedermann
- Baron Adolf Kohner de Szaszberek
- Fischer, Fischer von Farkasházy
- Goldberger de Buda
- Hatvany-Deutsch
- Hevesy von Bischitz
- Hollitscher
- Jüllich
- Königswarter
- Zsigmond Kornfeld
- von Lieben
- László de Lombos
- von Neumann
- Ronai (Baron Herman Weinberger von Rόna)
- von Rosenberg-Redé
- Schey von Koromla
- Schossberger de Tornya
- Szitányi Ullmann
- von Wertheimstein
- Zuckerkandl

== Italian ==
- Baron Lumbroso, said to be from Egyptian-Jewish origin
- Baron Mazza, Naples
- Baron Albert Grant Albert Grant (company promoter)
- del Castelo
- Paradiso
- Camondo
- Gabrielli Weißmann von Tyrol
- Rothschild banking family of Naples
- Tedesco
- Mendola, Palermo
- Montini
- The Franchetti Barons
- Reinach
- Senigaglia family
- Vigil
- Conte Cahen d'Anvers and Cahen di Torre Alfina (marchese)

== Portuguese ==
Arms of the d'Aguilar Barons

- Baron Diego Pereira d'Aguilar, Portuguese-born London-based Jewish businessman, created a baron of the Holy Roman Empire by Empress Maria Theresa of Austria.
- Baron Ephraim Lópes Pereira d'Aguilar, second Baron d'Aguilar, a Barony of the Holy Roman Empire.
- Baron Harry Emanuel de Almeda
- Frédéric Émile d'Erlanger
- David de Stern, German-born British holder of a Portuguese viscountcy
- Rabbi Abraham Pimentel, Sephardic Portuguese Rabbi

== Russian ==
Coat of arms of the Babanin family

- Baron Peter Shafirov (1670–1739), vice-chancellor of Russia under Peter the Great
- Babanin family, a noble family that originated in the Tsardom of Russia
- Günzburg, also Gunzbourg
  - Baron Joseph Günzburg, Osip Gintsburg, or Iosif-Evzel Gabrielovich Gintsburg (1812, Vitebsk - 1878, Paris), Industrialist
    - Baron Horace Günzburg, Goratsiy Evzelevich Gintsburg, Naftali-Gerts Evzelevich Ginstsburg (1833, Zvenigorodka, Kiev province - 1909, St. Petersburg), Financier, Industrialist
      - Baron Alexander Günzburg, Aleksandr Goratsievich Gintsburg (1863, Paris - 1948, Switzerland)
      - Baron David Goratsiyevich Günzburg (Барон Давид Горациевич Гинцбург David Goratsievich Gintsburg, July 5, 1857, Kamenetz-Podolsk - December 22, 1910, St. Petersburg) was a Russian orientalist and Jewish communal leader.
        - Baron Nicolas de Gunzburg, (1904–1981) socialite, editor, actor, producer.
- Grinkrugi
- Ephron
- Ephrussi
- Kanegissery
- Krupa/Kruppa
- Polyakova
- Dobrowolski Counts (later Dobrow), Russian and Polish family
- Gantsmakher
- Khaykin
- Ransohov
- Stieglitz (de)
  - Baron Ludwig von Stieglitz
    - Baron Alexander von Stieglitz
- Wertheim
- Nasonov
- Menschikoff

== Spanish ==
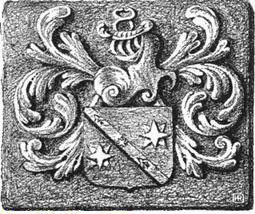
Coat of arms of the Abravanel family.

- Aboab
- Abravanel
- Arditti - of the Aragonese court
- Bargallo
- Benveniste
- Maluenda
- De la Cavalleria
- Marmol
- Cabrera
- Carvajal
- Camondo
- Cohen
- Curiel
- Flores
- Nahon
- Paredes
- Pimentel (Portuguese/Spanish Rabbi)
- Roditi
- Safira
- Saltiel (Shaltiel)
- Senior Coronel
- Surel
- Verdugo (Berdugo)
- Vázquez
- Vigil
- Yañez

== See also ==
- Court Jew
- Jewish heraldry
