= Porges =

Porges (Hebrew: פורגס) is a surname. Notable people with the surname include:

- Aaron ben Benjamin Porges, 17th century rabbi from Prague
- Gabriel Porges
  - Moses Porges, (since 1841) Moses Porges, (Edler) von Portheim (1781, Prague - 1870, Prague), Czech-Austrian industrialist, vice-burgomaster of Smichow
    - Joseph Porges (Edler) von Portheim (1817, Prague - 1904, Prague), a Jewish Czech-Austrian manufacturer and art patron, son of Moses
- Simon Porges (1801–1869) ∞ Charlotte Porges (1801–1869)
  - Heinrich Porges (1837, Prague - 1900, München), Jewish Czech-Austrian/German choirmaster, music-critic ∞ Wilhelmine Merores
    - Else (Elsa) Bernstein(-Porges), née Porges) (1866, Vienna - 1949, Hamburg-Eimsbüttel)
- Julius "Jules" Porgès (born Yehuda Porges; 1839, Vienna - 1921), Austria-born Paris-based financier and Randlord
- Nathan Porges (1848, Prostějov, Moravia - 1924), Czech-German rabbi
- Moritz Porges (1857–1909), Jewish Czech chess player
- Arthur Porges (1915, Chicago, Illinois - 2006), US pulp magazine author of short stories
- Paul Peter Porges (born 1927, Vienna), Jewish Austrian-American cartoonist
- Jan (Filip) Klusák (né Porges) (born 1934, Prague), Jewish Czech composer, author of film
- Ingo Porges (born 1938, Hamburg), German footballer (de)
- Stephen Porges (born 1945, New Brunswick, New Jersey), US Professor in the University of Illinois at Chicago
- Seth Porges, technology journalist, television commentator, and editor at Popular Mechanics magazine
- Nenad Porges (born 1946, Zagreb, SFR Yugoslavia, (now Croatia)), Croatian politician, businessman, entrepreneur and former Minister of Economy, Labour and Entrepreneurship
- József Porgesz Hungarian: Porgesz József, Jewish Hungarian architect
- Waldo William Porges (1899–1976), Old Etonian and Queen's Counsel (UK), son of Gustav Porges, Quartermaster, American Expeditionary Force, WW1.

== See also ==
- Le Porge, commune in the Gironde department, Aquitaine, south-western France

Porges families website : http://porges.net
