= Jewish aristocracy =

Jewish aristocracy may refer to:

- Patriarchal age
- Kohen
- Kings of Israel and Judah
- List of Jewish leaders in the Land of Israel
- Kings of Judah
- List of European Jewish nobility
- Sephardic Jews

== See also ==
- Solomon's Temple
