= Hugo Scheiber =

Hungarian artist (1873–1950)

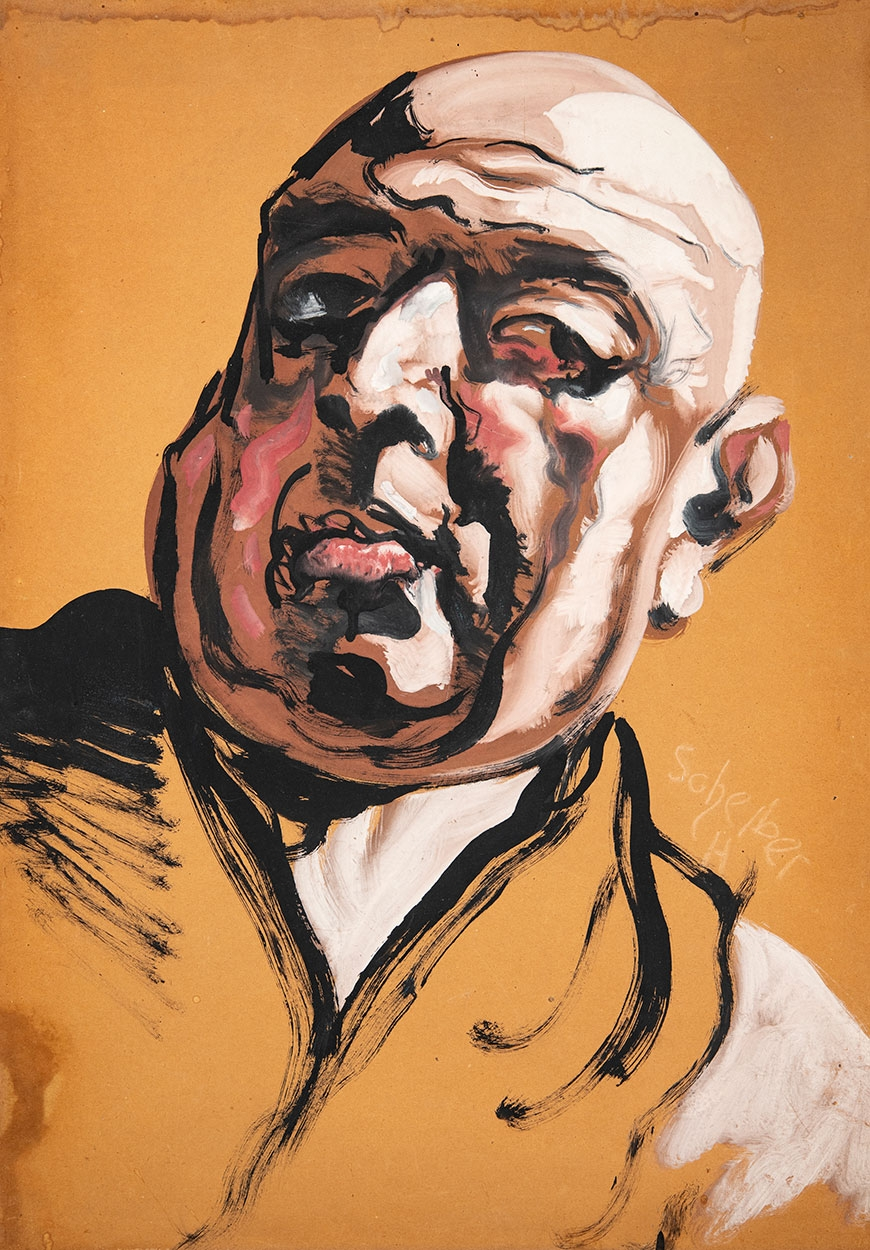
Self-portrait

Hugó Scheiber (born 29 September 1873 in Budapest – died there 7 March 1950) was a Jewish-Hungarian modernist painter.

== Life ==
Hugó Scheiber was brought from Budapest to Vienna at the age of eight where his father worked as a sign painter for the Prater Theater. At fifteen, he returned with his family to Budapest and began working during the day to help support them and attending painting classes at the School of Design in the evening, where Henrik Papp was one of his teachers. He completed his studies in 1900. His work was at first in a post-Impressionistic style but from 1910 onward showed his increasing interest in German Expressionism and Futurism. This made it of little interest to the conservative Hungarian art establishment.

However, in 1915 he met the great Italian avant-gardist Filippo Tommaso Marinetti and the two painters became close friends. Marinetti invited him to join the Futurist Movement. The uniquely modernist style that he developed was, however, closer to German Expressionism than to Futurism and eventually drifted toward an international art deco manner similar to Erté's. In 1919, he and his friend Béla Kádár held an exhibition at the Hevesy Salon in Vienna. It was a great success and at last caused the Budapest Art Museum to acquire some of Scheiber's drawings. Encouraged, Scheiber came back to live in Vienna in 1920.

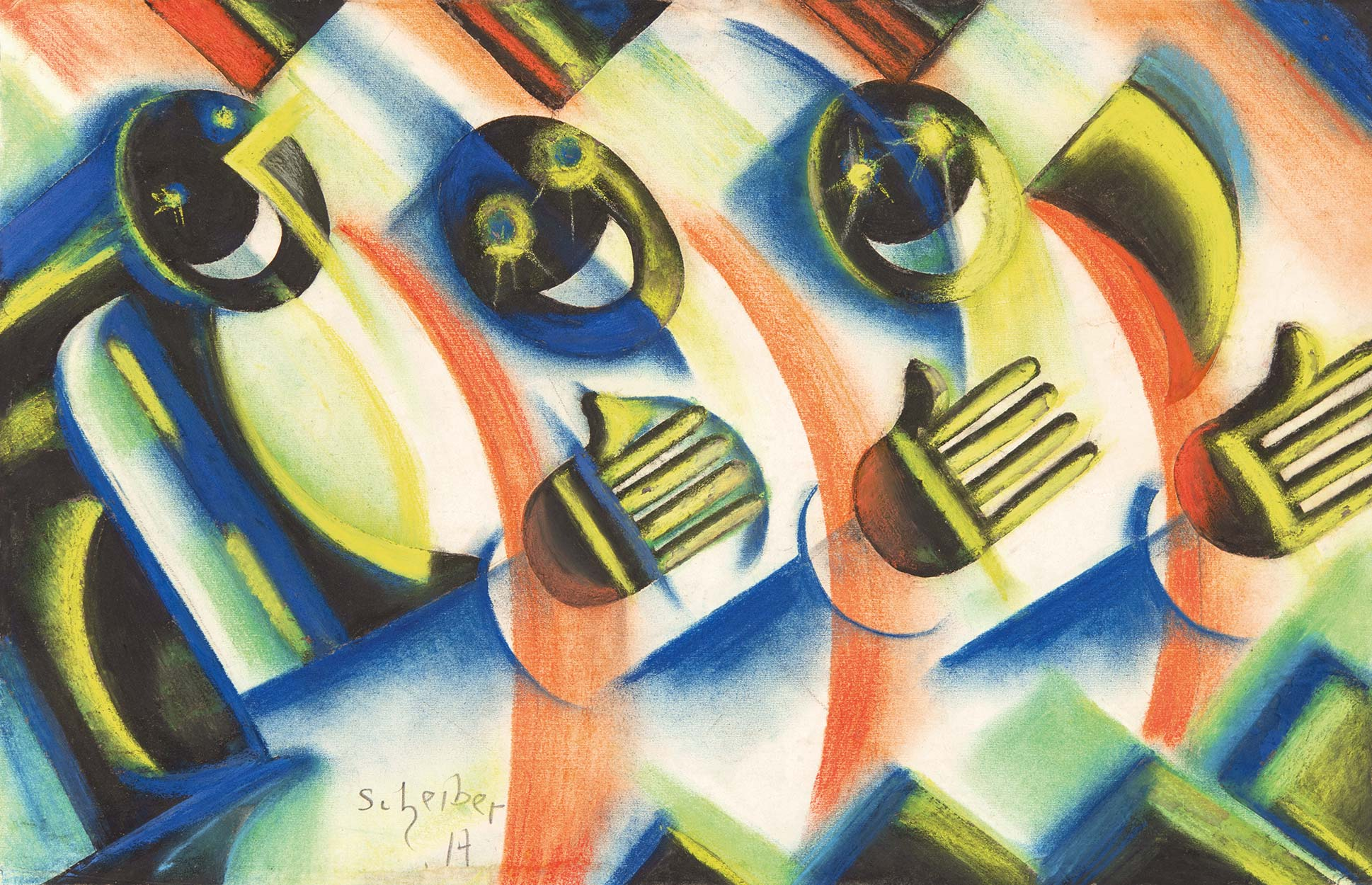
Jazz band

A turning point in Scheiber's career came a year later, when Herwarth Walden, founder of Germany's leading avant-garde periodical, Der Sturm, and of the Sturm Gallery in Berlin, became interested in Scheiber's work. Scheiber moved to Berlin in 1922, and his paintings soon appeared regularly in Walden's magazine and elsewhere. Exhibitions of his work followed in London, Rome, La Paz, and New York.

Scheiber's move to Germany coincided with a significant exodus of Hungarian artists to Berlin, including László Moholy-Nagy and Sándor Bortnyik. There had been a major split in ideology among the Hungarian avant-garde. The Constructivist and leader of the Hungarian avantgarde, Lajos Kassák (painted by Hugó Scheiber in 1930) believed that art should relate to all the needs of contemporary humankind. Thus he refused to compromise the purity of his style to reflect the demands of either the ruling class or socialists and communists. The other camp believed that an artist should be a figurehead for social and political change.

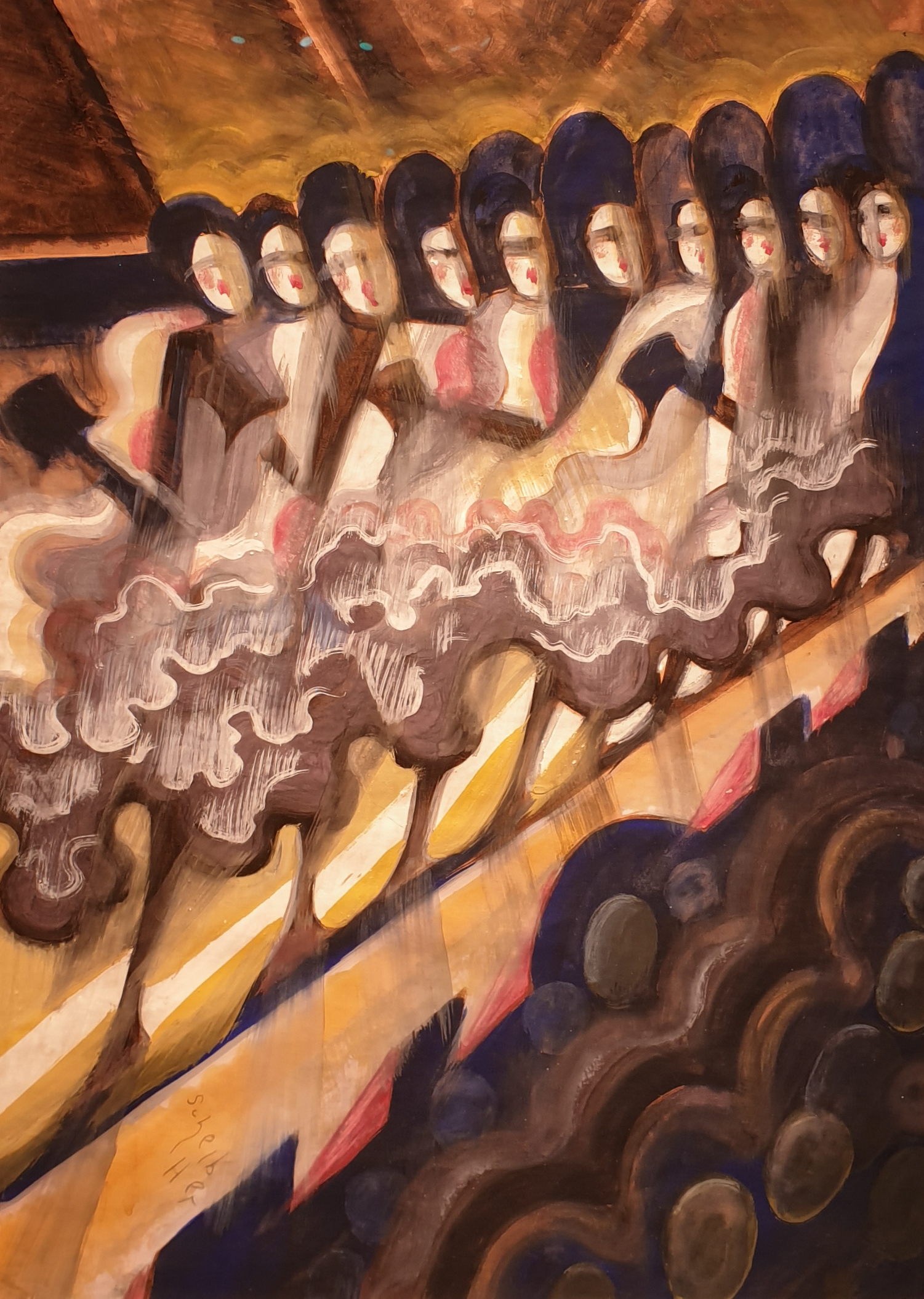
Cancan

The fall out and factions that resulted from this politicisation resulted in most of the Hungarian avantgardists leaving Vienna for Berlin. Hungarian émigrés made up one of the largest minority groups in the German capital and the influx of their painters had a significant effect on Hungarian and international art. Apart from the political activists, there were independent Modernists such as Scheiber and Kádár, who hoped to find fertile ground for their aesthetic and social idealism. Hugó Scheiber, among others, suddenly found himself in the upper echelons of the dynamic Berlin art world. Another turning point of Scheiber's career came in 1926, with the New York exhibition of the Société Anonyme, organized by Katherine Dreier. Scheiber and other important avantgarde artists from more than twenty-three countries were represented. In 1933, Scheiber was invited by Marinetti to participate in the great meeting of the Futurists held in Rome in late April 1933, Mostra Nazionale d’Arte Futurista where he was received with great enthusiasm. Gradually, the Hungarian artists began to return home, particularly with the rise of Nazism in Germany. Kádár went back from Berlin in about 1932 and Scheiber followed in 1934.

He was then at the peak of his powers and had a special flair in depicting café and cabaret life in vivid colors, sturdily abstracted forms and spontaneous brush strokes. Scheiber depicted cosmopolitan modern life using stylized shapes and expressive colors. His preferred subjects were cabaret and street scenes, jazz musicians, flappers, and a series of self-portraits (usually with a cigar). A highly prolific workman, he produced well over 1500 works (nearly 1300 are still listed on www.artnet.com), his principal media being gouache and oil. He was a member of the prestigious New Society of Artists (KUT—Képzőművészek Új Társasága) and seems to have weathered Hungary's post–World War II transition to state-communism without difficulty. He continued to be well regarded, eventually even receiving the posthumous honor of having one of his images used for a Soviet postage stamp (see image above). Hugó Scheiber died in Budapest in 1950. He is buried at the Kozma Street Cemetery, the biggest Jewish cemetery of Budapest.

== Museums and Exhibits ==
Paintings by Hugó Scheiber form part of permanent museum collections in Budapest (Hungarian National Museum), Pecs (Jannus Pannonius Museum), Vienna, New York, Bern and elsewhere. His work has also been shown in many important exhibitions, including:

- "The Nell Walden Collection," Kunsthaus Zürich (1945)
- "Collection of the Société Anonyme," Yale University Art Gallery, New Haven, Connecticut (1950)
- "Hugó Scheiber: A Commemorative Exhibition," Hungarian National Museum, Budapest (1964)
- "Ungarische Avantgarde," Galleria del Levante, Munich (1971)
- "Paris-Berlin 1900-1930," Centre Georges Pompidou, Paris (1978)
- "L’Art en Hongrie, 1905-1920," Musée d’Art et l’Industrie, Saint-Etienne (1980)
- "Ungarische Avangarde in der Weimarer Republik," Marburg (1986)
- "Modernizmus," Eresz & Maklary Gallery, Budapest (2006)
- "Hugó Scheiber & Béla Kádár," Galerie le Minotaure, Paris and Tel Aviv (2007)

Hugó Scheiber's paintings continue to be regularly sold at Sotheby's, Christie's, Gillen's Arts (London), Papillon Gallery (Los Angeles) and other auction houses.

== Bibliography ==
- A Storm in Europe: Béla Kádar, Hugó Scheiber and Der Sturm in Berlin (Ben Uri Gallery, The London Museum of Art, 2003), ISBN 978-0900157028
- Georges Darany & Ernest Schmidt, Hugó Scheiber: Leben und Werk (Edition Inter Art Galerie, 1982)
- Le Guidargus de la peinture (G. Schurr: Editions de l’amateur, Paris, 2000)
- Bénézit Dictionnaire critique et documentaire des peintres, sculpteurs, dessinateurs et graveurs, vol. 9 (E. Bénézit, Librairie Gründ, Paris, 1976).
- Haulish Lenke, Hugó Scheiber (Serpento, Budapest, 1995), ISBN 9789638551900.
- Bela Kadar&Hugo Scheiber, A Storm in Europe (Ben Uri Gallery and Museum, 2003), ISBN 978-0900157028.
