= Jasmin Hasić =

Bosnia and Herzegovina male boxer

Personal information
- Nationality: Bosnia and Herzegovina
- Born: 28 September 1988 (age 37) Banovići

Sport
- Sport: Boxing
- Weight class: Super Heavyweight
Medal record
European Junior Boxing Championships
Bronze medal – third place	2007 Sombor	Super Heavyweight

Jasmin Hasić (born 28 September 1988, Banovići) Bosnian-born boxer in super heavyweight best known for winning bronze medal at the European Junior Championships 2007 in Sombor.

At the European Junior Championships 2007, he defeated Drastamat Aslanyan from Armenia 17:16 and Darko Pirc from Croatia 24:3 but lost to Maxim Babanin from Russia by retiring in 4th round.

In 2007, the Bosnian Sports Association named him the Bosnian Junior Sportsman of the Year.
