= Francisco Lopes (disambiguation) =

Francisco Lopes is a Portuguese electrician and communist politician.

Francisco Lopes may also refer to:

- Francisco Lopes Suasso
- Francisco Lopes de Gomara
- Francisco Santos (swimmer, born 1962)
