= Jirásek Bridge =

Jirásek Bridge Jiráskův most
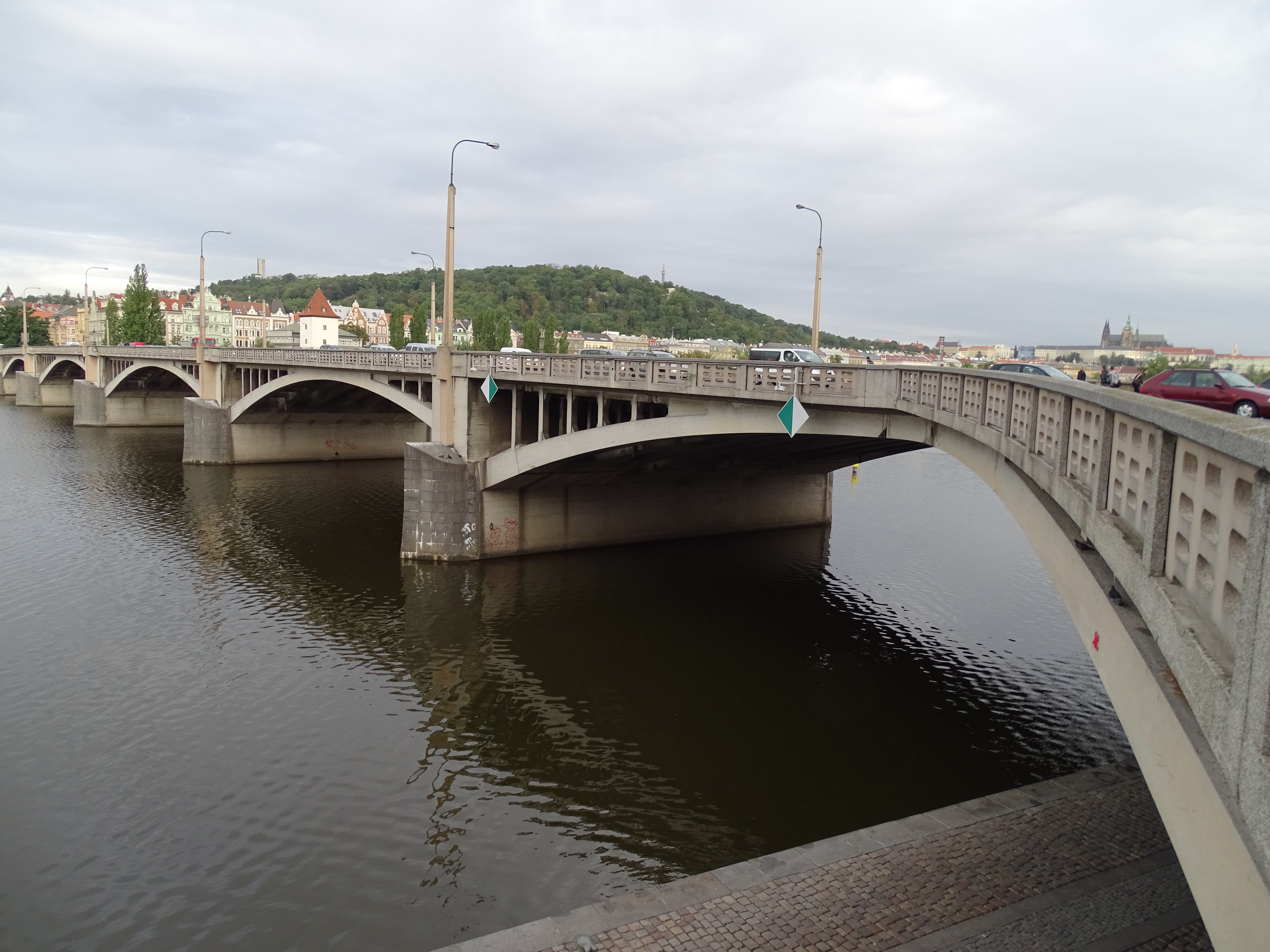
- The bridge in 2015
- Coordinates: 50°04′32″N 14°24′42″E
- Crosses: Vltava
- Locale: Prague, Czech Republic

Characteristics
- Width: 21 m (69 ft)

History
- Architect: Vlastislav Hofman
- Designer: František Mencl
- Construction start: 1929
- Construction end: 27 October 1933
- Opened: December 1931

Location
- Interactive map of Jirásek Bridge

Jirásek Bridge (Czech: Jiráskův most) is a bridge over the Vltava in Prague, Czech Republic. Partially opened in December 1931, and completed in 1933, the bridge was named Dientzenhoferův most between 1940 and 1945. It connects Smíchov with Prague's New Town.
