= Aaron Berechiah of Modena =

Italian cabalist

Aaron Berechiah ben Moses ben Nehemiah of Modena (1549-1639) was an Italian kabbalist. He is the author of Ma'avar Yabboḳ, the primary source text for Jewish burial practices.

== Biography ==
Aaron Berachiah was a pupil of Rabbi Hillel of Modena (surnamed Ḥasid we-Ḳaddosh, that is, "The Pious and Holy") and of the Italian Kabbalist Rabbi Menahem Azariah of Fano. He was a nephew of Rabbi Yehuda Aryeh de Modena and a student of Rabbi Israel Sarug who was a student of the Safed Kabbalist Isaac Luria. His brother-in-law was Rabbi Yosef Yedidya Krami, the author of Kanaf Renanim.

=== Persecution by the Church ===
He was arrested and imprisoned in 1636 for possessing forbidden books, namely, those singled out for censorship, expurgation or confiscation because of passages putatively critical of Christians. In his defense, he stated:

I have nothing else to say, but because the Holy Inquisition tolerates us in its States, consequently we are also allowed to own these books, which deal with our ceremonies, because it is impossible for us to live in these countries if we do not have books that teach us the principles of our faith, and although Your Lordship told us that Clemente VIII promulgated the bull that banned a number of books from the Jews, to my knowledge this bull has never been enforced, neither were the books confiscated from the Jews. Furthermore, even [Christian] preachers sometimes cite the Shulchan Aruch, Rav Alfassi, or similar books to convince the Jews [to convert] and they could not do this if we were prohibited to read or to own these books.

== Books ==
His first work was the siddur Ashmoret haBoḳer (1624), containing liturgy compiled for Mei're HaShachar (a Lurianic early morning prayer group he founded), and therefore also published under this name.

His most well known work, Ma'avar Yabbok ("Crossing the Yabbok", 1626) was written at the request of the Chevra kadisha (burial society) of Mantua. In the first chapter, Siftei Tzedek, he compiled liturgy to accompany the work of caring for the dead, prayers to be offered for those who are sick, and rules and instructions for their care. He explains the importance of caring for the sick and the dying, and offers detailed confessional liturgy (vidu'i) not only for the end of life, but for the merit and well-being of the soul. His detailed kabbalistic teachings are in the following chapters, which are focused on in-depth study rather than the skilled work of the Chevra Kadisha. To avert possible criticism for failing to discuss these themes philosophically, he makes use of the statement of Isaac Arama: "Reason must surrender some of its rights to the divine revelations which are superior to it." This text was translated into Yiddish by a Jewish woman, Ellus bas Mordecai of Slutsk (Belarus). Some editions feature an introduction by Aaron ben Benjamin Porges.

His other works include:

- Me'il Ẓedaḳah (The Cloak of Righteousness), on worship and study, published at Mantua in 1767, together with Bigde Ḳodesh (Garments of Holiness), on the same subject.
- Bigde Ḳodesh (Garments of Holiness), on worship and study
- Ḥibbur beḲabbalah, a work on the Cabala, consisting of four volumes:
  - Shemen Mishḥat Ḳodesh (The Oil of Holy Anointment), on the principles of the Cabala according to Moses Cordovero and Isaac Luria
  - Shemen Zait Zak (The Pure Oil of the Olive), public addresses on the same subject
  - Shetil Poreaḥ (The Blossoming Plant), on the mysterious meaning of prayers and ceremonies
  - Imre Shefer (Words of Beauty), and miscellaneous matter; this whole work was seen in manuscript by Azulai at Modena, and is found in parts in some libraries.
- Magen Aharon (Shield of Aaron), containing a compendium of Luria's works. This fertile writer is said to have been, like Joseph Caro, in constant communion with a spirit called the Maggid.
- A commentary on Tiḳḳune ha-Zohar
