= Dětský Island =

Island on the Vltava river in Prague, Czech Republic

Native name: Dětský ostrov
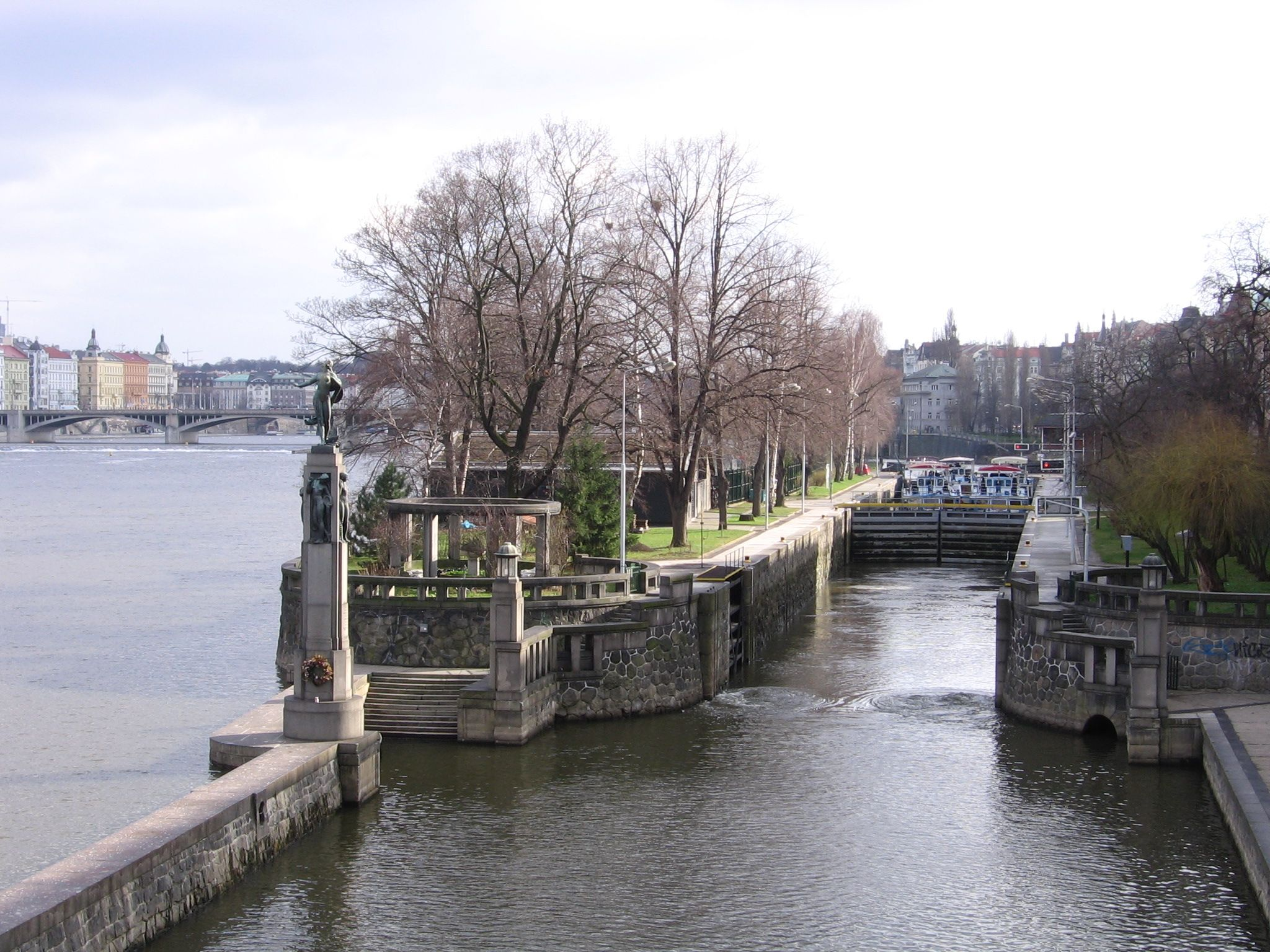
- The northern end of Dětský Island with a statue of the Vltava
- Interactive map of Dětský Island

Geography
- Location: Vltava
- Coordinates: 50°04′42″N 14°24′33″E

Administration
- Czech Republic

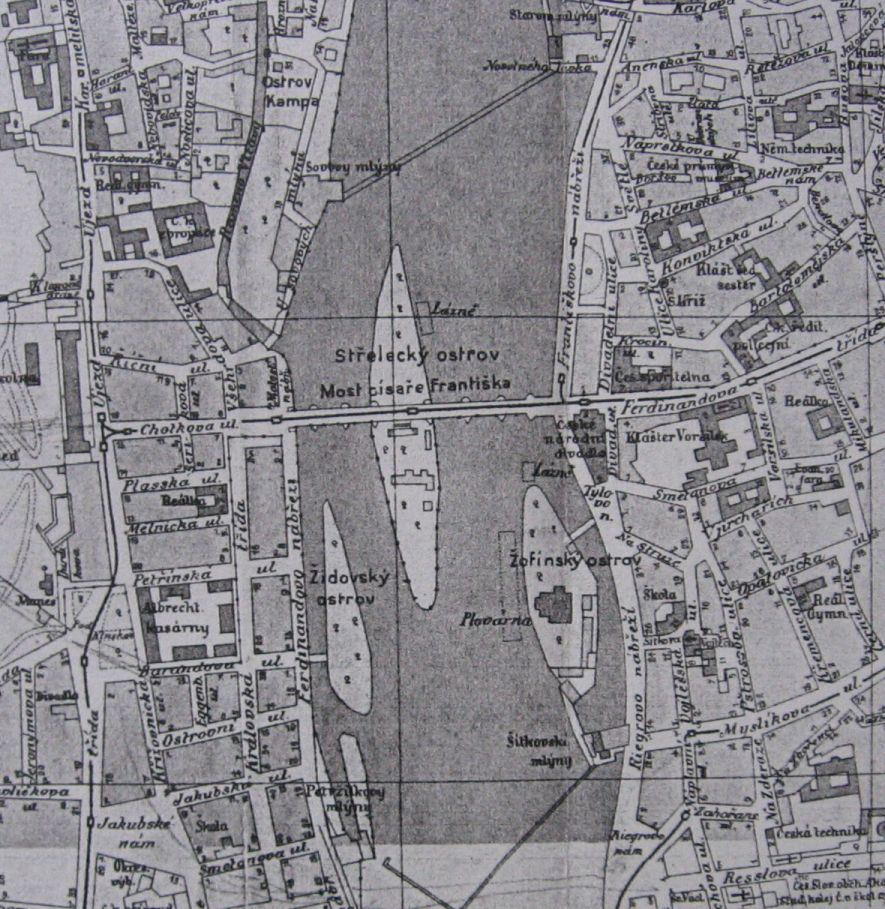
A 1910 map of the Vltava showing Dětský Island as "Židovský ostrov"

Dětský Island (Czech Dětský ostrov — literally Children's Island) is an island on the Vltava River in Prague, Czech Republic. It lies in the Smíchov district of the city.

It is mentioned in texts as early as 1355. Until the 18th century, it was called Maltézský Island (after the owner of the Maltese monastery Panny Marie pod řetězem in the Lesser Quarter). Subsequently, it was named after members of Prague's Jewish community who owned the land – such names include Hykyšův, Funkovský, and Židovský.

The island was artificially enlarged with the construction of the Smíchov floodgates (1913–1916). The south of the Island was attached to Petržílkovského island and a long dividing wall was built on the north side. The floodgates have two locks and they bypass two weirs on the river.

An allegorical statue of the Vltava river and its tributaries stands on the northern side of the island. Each year on All Souls' Day (November 2), members of the association "Vltavan" place a wreath here as a memorial to those who have drowned in the river.

The present-day segmented foot-bridge to the island was built in 1933. It is built on supports originally constructed for a proposed bridge from Myslíkova street (Jiráskův Bridge).

The island's current name originates from the beginning of the 1960s, when a children's playground was built here.
