= Jewish heraldry =

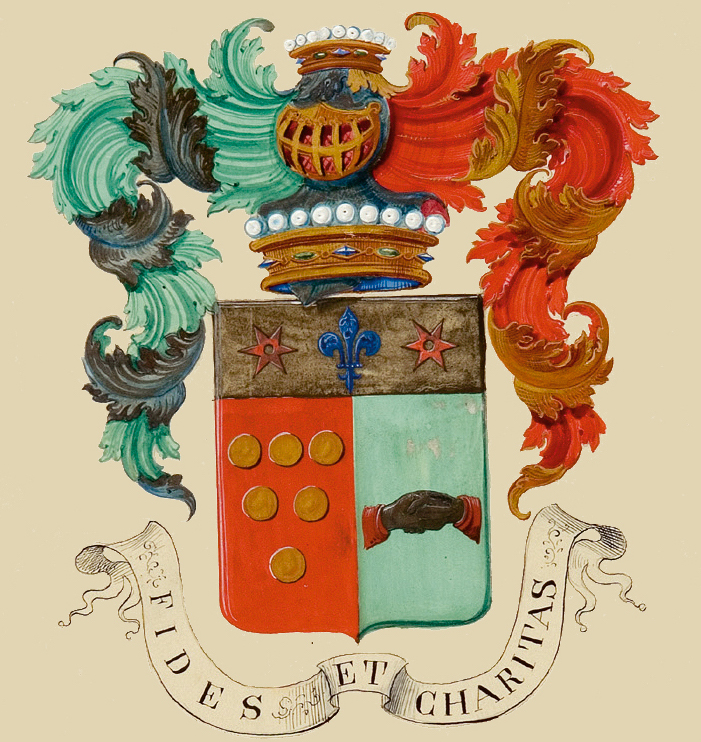
Arms of the Camondo family, French-Italian Jewish nobility of Ottoman origin

Jewish heraldry is the tradition and style of heraldic achievements amongst Jewish communities throughout Europe and (in modern history) abroad. Included are the national and civic arms of the State of Israel, noble and burgher arms, synagogal heraldry, heraldic displays and heraldic descriptions. Jewish Heraldry is commonly influenced by its country of origin, yet often preserves common Jewish symbolisms such as the Lion of Judah or the Star of David.

== History ==
=== Pre-Enlightenment ===
Arms of Sir Moses Montefiore, a wealthy 19th-century British financier and banker. Included in the Arms are two Stars of David and a flag that reads ’ירושלים’ ("Jerusalem")

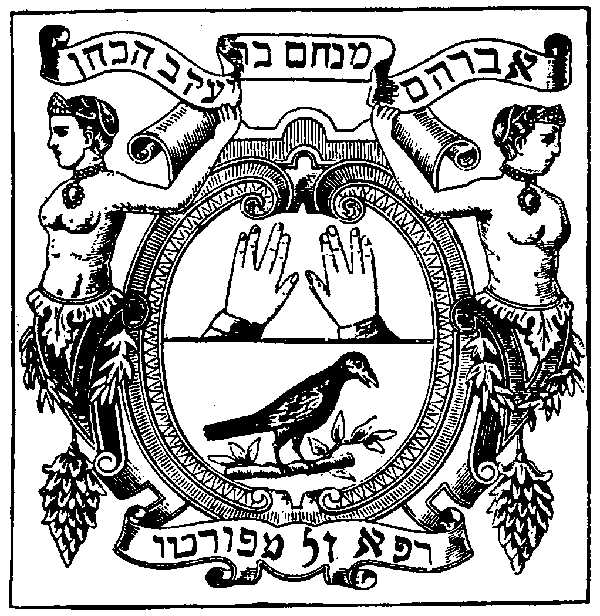
Arms of Rappaport Family, a prominent Kohanic rabbinic family.

The first adopters of the Heraldic tradition were the wealthy Sephardic Jews of Spain, who had risen to great economic and social prominence. Families such as the Abravanel adopted heraldry, displaying it on their houses and using it on their seals. Yet the Abravanel, like many other Jewish families at the time, retained Jewish symbolism, which differentiated their arms from their neighbours (such as a double Star of David).

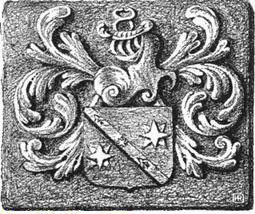
Arms of Abravanel Family

About 200 years later, several influential Jewish French families adopted the heraldic tradition of official familial seals. Like the early 14th century seal of Kalonymos bar Todros HaNasi, the leader of the Jewish community in Narbonne, France, who used a lion rampant to represent him and his family. He adopted this symbolism to represent his connection to the Davidic line, thus setting the precedent of the Lion of Judah as a common Jewish heraldic charge. Another example is the arms of the wealthy Jew "Samuel of Venice", which a 1383 manuscript describes as "per fess a lion issuant and a fess wavy". A number of Jews also used a Jew's Hat on their arms. One amusing example is the seal of a German-Jewish man named "Byfegin of Koblenz" (1397) who bears a lion rampant "crowned" with a Jew's hat. Additionally, several Jewish Heraldic achievements were those of the Jewish community of a city: early 13th-century examples in France show that the Jews of Paris used an eagle rising on a semis of fleurs-de-lys. Later, following the edict of 1696, some Jewish families were assigned coats of arms for tax purposes.

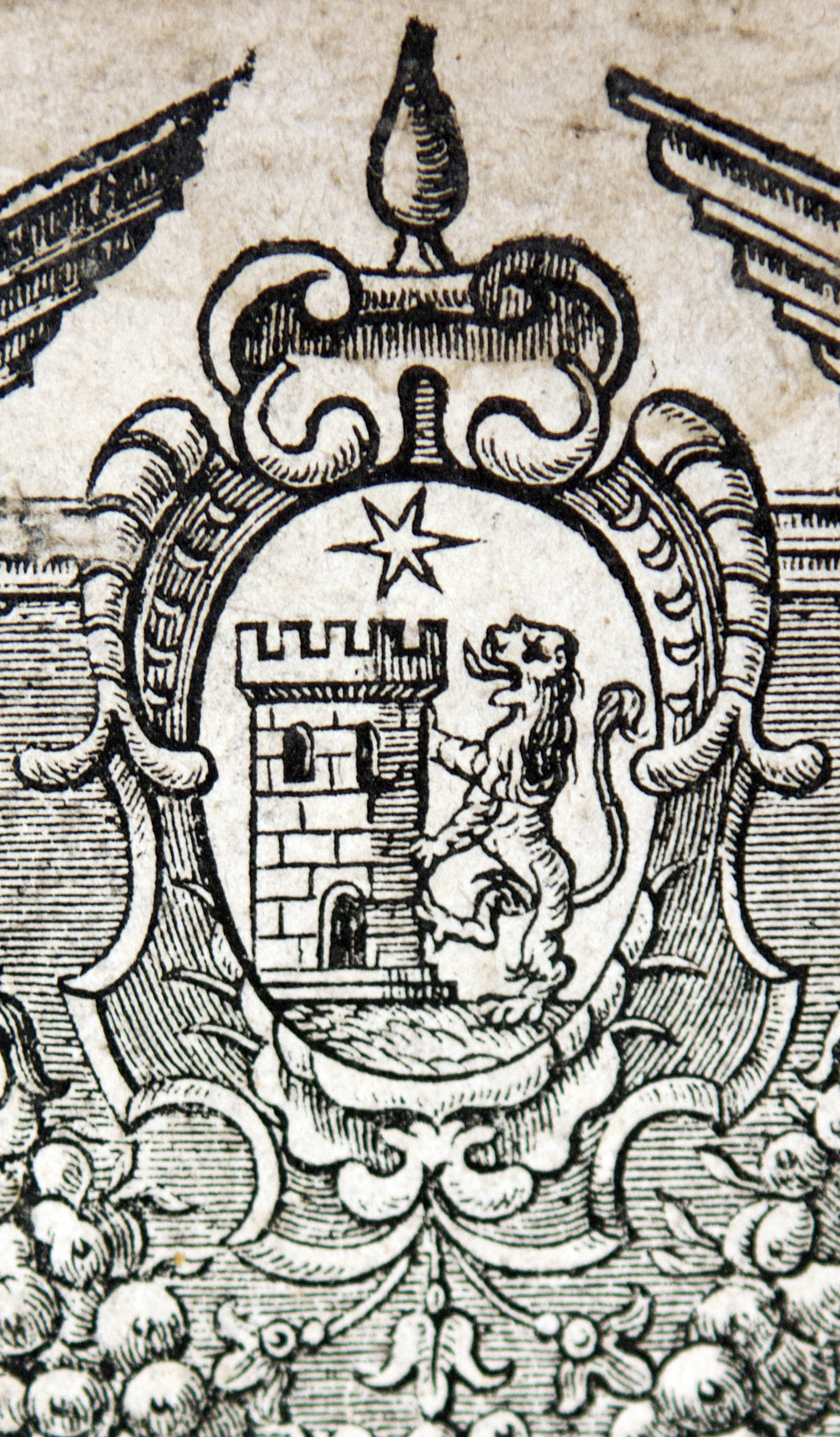
Coat of Arms (Printer's Mark) of Immanuel Benveniste, Amsterdam, 17th century.

The trend of Jewish Heraldry was accelerated in the 16th century, especially in Amsterdam and parts of Italy, where several Jews obtained chairs at universities in Perugia, Ferrara, Bologna in 1528, and Rome in 1539, which in some cases carried with them personal nobility. One Jew of Bologna even received a knighthood from Charles V. In the early 17th century, several wealthy Western Sephardic Jews immigrated to Amsterdam and with them, brought in great economic prosperity to the city. Many Dutch Jews were granted minor noble titles and given the rights to bear arms. Such as the Benveniste family who, when emigrating to the Amsterdam adopted a new arms which included the Star of David, a lion cub of Judah a castle and 10 moons (the Kabbalist symbols of the 10 Sefirot). This was a common trend of the Dutch Jewish community who adopted arms which were not overtly Jewish, yet had several deeply rooted Jewish symbolisms. Jewish Heraldry also spread to the Holy Roman Empire in the late 17th when the laws against Jews carrying arms became more relaxed. The first Jew in the HRE to receive a grant of arms was Jacob Batsheba Schmieles who was ennobled at the same time, having in 1622 been made a knight of the Holy Roman Empire with the title of *Bassevi von Treuenberg. (Sable, on a bend argent between two lions passant bendwise or, three eight-pointed stars gules)

=== Post-Enlightenment ===
During the Age of Enlightenment, several hundred Jewish families were granted arms throughout Europe and were made part of the Nobility. Such as the Rothchilds, Montefiores, Goldsmids and Sassoon families, who were all granted arms and noble titles in England. Many wealthy British Jews would once again adopt the heraldic customs of their country while still retaining many Jewish elements. However, during the first and second Aliyah, many British Jews adopted Zionist symbolisms on the arms such as Sir Moses Montefiore, who adopted a Zionist tree and flag on his arms, alongside a double star of David. Additionally, during this time, several German and Russian Jews were being granted arms on a systemic scale. Such as the Stieglitz, von Eskeles, von Hofmannsthal and Morpurgo families. All of whom employed several Jewish symbolism on their arms. In recent years, the majority of new official Jewish Heraldry has been produced by the Canadian Heraldic Authority, who have given several grants to distinguished Canadian Jews such as Izzy Asper and Myra Freeman and distinguished Jewish institutions such as the historic Spanish and Portuguese Synagogue of Montreal.

== Israel ==
The Emblem of Israel shows a menorah surrounded by an olive branch on each side, and the writing "ישראל" (Hebrew for Israel) below it. The image used on the emblem is based on a depiction of the menorah on the Arch of Titus. The menorah was used in the ancient Temple in Jerusalem and has been a symbol of Judaism since ancient times. The olive branches symbolize peace. The symbol is used on coinage and refers back to Hasmonean coinage. The Emblem of Jerusalem features the Lion of Judah.

Emblem of Israel

Emblem of Jerusalem

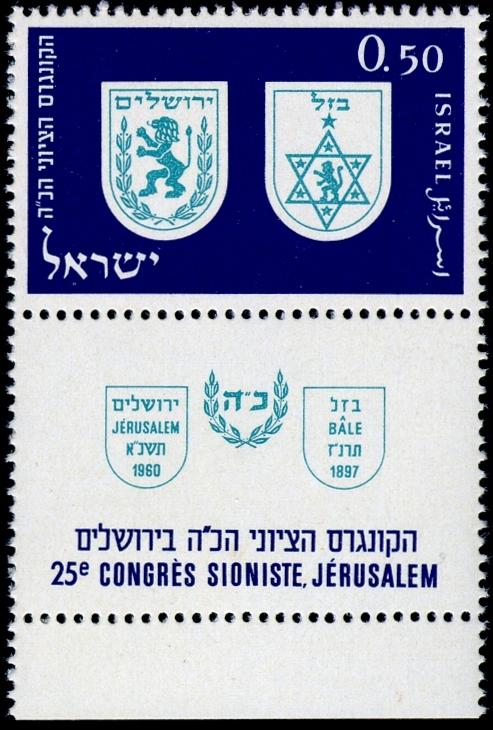
Stamp of Israel - 25th Zionist Congress

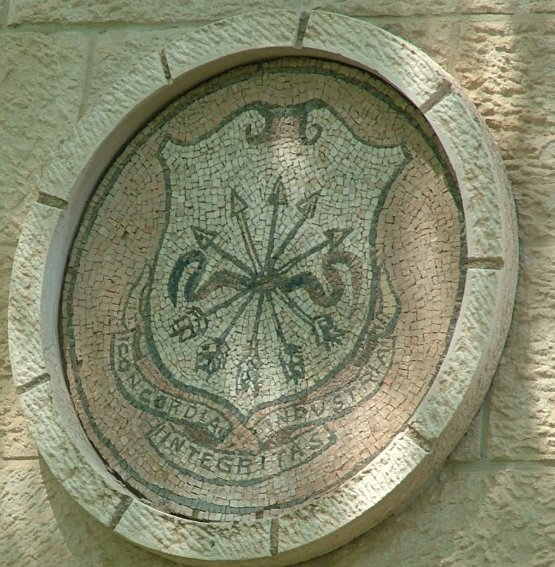
Escutcheon, Beit Hashimshony, Jerusalem

== See also ==
- List of European Jewish nobility
- Jewish symbolism
- Bar Kokhba Revolt coinage
- Hasmonean coinage
