= Ellus bas Mordecai =

Ellus bas Mordecai (Hebrew: מרת עלוש) was a Jewish woman from Slutsk, then part of the Grand Duchy of Lithuania. In a time when female translators of Jewish religious texts were rare, she translated two works from Hebrew into Yiddish, which were published in 1704.

The first was an abridged translation of Ma'abar Yabboḳ ("The Ford of the Yabbok") by Aaron Berechiah of Modena, a Kabbalistic text about rituals for the dying and the dead. The second was a translation of Shomrim la-boker ("Watchers for the Morning"), a sunrise prayer liturgy. In her introduction to the latter, she writes that she was motivated by the fact that "many men and women chirp like birds" reciting the Hebrew prayers without a full understanding of the language. The latter book was published with no less than three haskamot, or rabbinical approbations, perhaps the only Yiddish book by a woman to have so many rabbinical endorsements.

Ellus was married to Aaron, son of Rabbi Eliakim Goetz Ben Meir, author of Even HaShoham. Ellus and Aaron intended to immigrate to Eretz Israel, but stopped in Moravia where Aaron became a preacher. It is not known if they ever made it.
