= Lopes Suasso =

Aristocratic Portuguese Jewish family

Lopez Suasso
- Noble family
- Country: Netherlands; Portugal
- Founded: 16th century
- Founder: Dr. Pedro Lopes Fránces
- Dissolution: 1970

Lopes Suasso (also: Lopes Suasso Diaz da Fonseca an: Lopis de Suasso) is the name of an important aristocratic Portuguese Jewish family that played an important role in banking.

== History ==
The family history begins with Dr. Pedro Lopes Fránces who moved to Libourne as a medical doctor. His grandson Antonio (1614-1685) was granted title of Baron of Avernas le Gras (Brabant) by Charles II of Spain. He moved to the Netherlands and en was parnas of the Portuguese-Jewish community in The Hague. His descendants held important leading functions within the Portuguese-Jewish communities in the Netherlands. Through its banking activities, the family became one of the wealthiest families in the Netherlands. They are well known for having financed the Glorious Revolution

In 1818, 1821 and 1831 three members of the Lopes Suasso family were accepted into the Dutch nobility. They received the noble predict jonkheer. The last family member died in 1970.

The Lopes Suasso art collection became the foundation for the Stedelijk Museum of which Jan Eduard van Someren Brand (1856-1904) was the first curator.

== Family ==
Antonio (alias Isaac Israël) Lopes Suasso, baron van Avernas le Gras (1614-1685), agent of King Charles II of Spain; married Rachel de Pinto (1629-1706)

- Francisco Lopes Suasso (alias Abraham van Israel), baron van Avernas le Gras (ca. 1657-1710), banker and financier of the Glorious Revolution; married Judith Teixeira (1669-1749)
  - Pedro Lopes Suasso (alias Moses Israël) (1700-1742), married Rachel de Lima (1701-1733)
    - Antonio (alias Isaac) Lopes Suasso (1723-1776)
      - Pedro (alias Moses) Lopes Suasso (1752-1810); married in 1773 Rachel Diaz da Fonseca (1753-1836)
        - jhr. Antonio (alias Isaac Israël) Lopes Suasso Diaz da Fonseca (1776-1857), captain Horseguards and publicist; married Esther Elisabeth de Carteret. from a French aristocratic family.
          - Jhr. Hugo Antonio Lopez Suasso Diaz da Fonseca (1814-1836)
          - Jkvr. Esther Leonor Rachel Lopez Suasso Diaz da Fonseca (1816-1892) married in 1859 captain Alphonse Gustave Caspar Anton baron van Voorst tot Voorst (1812-1851)
          - Jhr. Mr. Alonso Antonio Lopez Suasso Diaz da Fonseca (1822-1887) married Amelia Lempriere de Carteret, and later Jeanne Deleu.
          - Jhr. Antonio Carteret Lopes Suasso Diaz da Fonseca (1813-1884) married in 1851 Marie Isabelle Lopez Suasso (1821-1860), in 1862 Marie Adrienno Louise Herminie de Wersenay (1815-1869), and in 1871 Adelaide Cecile Antoinette Burrieu (1828-1912).
            - Jkvr. Maria Helena Elvira Lopez Suasso Diaz da Fonseca (1852-1894) married in 1894 Albert Louis Joseph vicomte d'Alos Boscaud (born in 1846).
            - Jhr. Antonio Alvares Alexamder Lopez Suasso Diaz da Fonseca (1855-1891).
            - Jhr. Francisco Antonio Lopez Suasso Diaz da Fonseca (1859-), civil engineer in Buenos Aires, married in 1884 Adèle Ristorini (born 1860).
        - jhr. dr. Diego Lopez Suasso (1778-1859), medical doctor and judge in Amsterdam married in 1803 Sarotta de Chavel (1769-1847)
          - jhr. Augustus Pieter Lopez Suasso (1804-1877); married 1860 Sophia Adriana de Bruijn (1816-1890), founder of the Lopes Suasso art collection
  - Jeronimo (alias Aaron) Lopes Suasso (1702-1740) married Elisabeth de Pinto (1710-1780)
    - jhr. Moses (alias Moses van Israel) Lopes Suasso (1737-1818) married in 1761 his cousin Rachel Lopes Suasso (1740-1771), dochter van Francisco Lopes Suasso and Sara da Costa
      - jhr. Abraham Suasso da Costa (1764-1840), banker; married 1789 Elisabeth de Pinto (1767-1835)
        - jhr. Abraham Suasso de Pinto (1791-1862) married Kibca Mendes da Costa (born 1863)
          - jhr. Abraham Lopes Suasso (1818-1890), banker, married in 1845 Rachel Mendes da Costa (1824-1865).
            - Rebecca Lopes Suasso (born 1849) married in 1869 David Spinossa Cattela (1842-1915).
            - jhr. Emanuel Lopes Suasso (1853-1925), owner of the Gebr. Lopes Suasso company; married in 1883 Anna Aletrino (1864-1945), sister of Arnold Aletrino and friend of Louis Couperus
              - jkvr. Selima Lopes Suasso (1885-1970), last member of the family; married in 1906 Hendrik Alexander Cornelis van Booven (1877-1964), literature expert.
            - jhr. Abraham Lopes Suasso (1855-1927), painter; married in 1878 his cousin Rebecca Henriques de Castro (1859-1935), daughter of David de Mozes Henriques de Castro and jkvr. Sara Lopes Suasso de Pinto
              - jkvr. Céline Elisabeth Emma Lopes Suasso (1882-1958), painter; married in 1905 Christiaan Jacobus van Nievelt (1882-1954)
          - jkvr. Elisabeth Lopes Suasso (1819-1881); married in 1840 Samuel Teixeira de Mattos (1818-1883)
          - jkvr. Sara Lopes Suasso de Pinto (1822-1892); married in 1850 David van Moses Henriques de Castro (1826-1898), academic
        - jkvr. Rachel Suasso da Costa (1797-1848); married 1819 Jacob Bueno de Mesquita (1790-1865), merchant
      - jhr. Benjamin Lopes Suasso (1765-1839), banker
        - jhr. Moses Lopes Suasso (1803-1871), merchant, married in 1827 met Esther Henriques de Castro (1804-1880), painter
          - jhr. David Lopes Suasso (1830-1879), industrialist, married Rivca Moresco (1840-1885)
            - jhr. Francisco Ephraïm Lopes Suasso (1864- Auschwitz 1944), married Estella Henriques de Castro (born 1861).
              - jhr. David Gabriël Leonard Lopes Suasso (1891- Auschwitz 1943)
            - jkvr. Anna Lopes Suasso (1867- Theresienstadt 1944); married in 1892 Jacques Emile Belinfante (1865-1941), book publisher.
          - jhr. Isaac Lopes Suasso (1842-1904), stock broker
            - jhr. Mozes Lopes Suasso (1880-1931), stock broker, married in 1927 Rachel Anna Mendes da Costa (1892- Sobibór 1943)
            - jkvr. Esther Lopes Suasso (1881-1931); married in 1900 Bénoit Franco Mendes (1869- Auschwitz 1944), stock broker.
      - jhr. Jacob Lopes Suasso (1767-1830), president of the Portuguese-Jewish synagogue in The Hague.
        - jhr. David Lopis de Suasso (1815-1864).

== Gallery ==
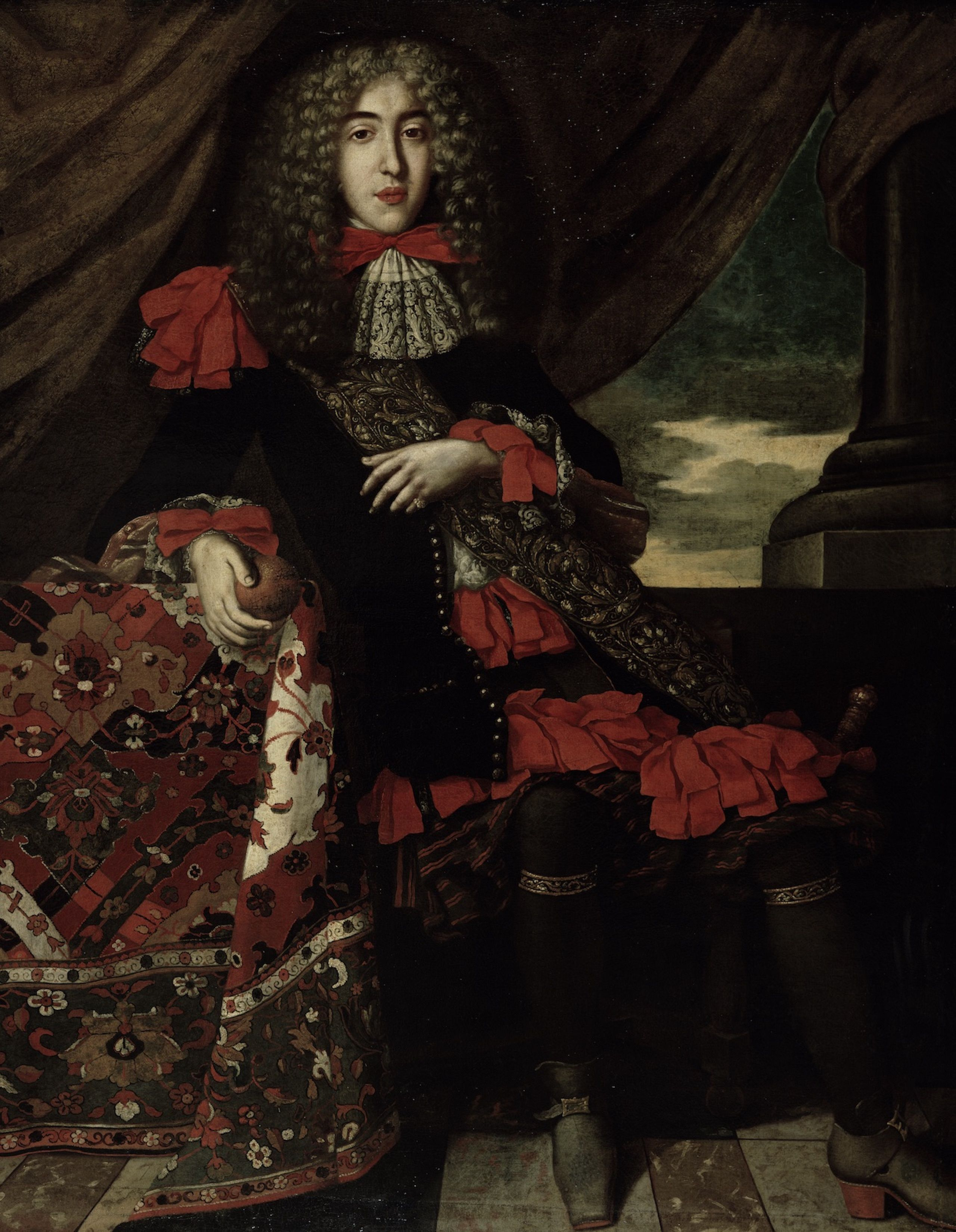
Francisco Lopes Suasso, second Baron d'Avernas le Gras (ca. 1657 – 22 April 1710).

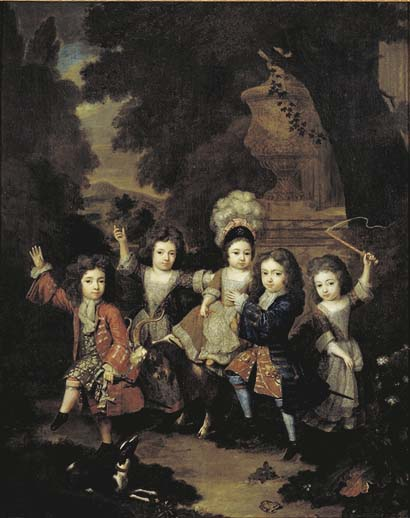
Lopes Suasso children, 17th century.

== Literature ==
- Nederland's Adelsboek 94 (2009), p. 284-303.
- Daniël Swetschinski, Loeki Schönduve, De familie Lopes Suasso, financiers van Willem III. Zwolle, 1988.
