= Joseph Porges von Portheim =

Joseph Porges, Edler von Portheim (1817 in Prague – 3 September 1904 in Prague) was a Czech-Austrian manufacturer and art patron; son of Moses Porges von Portheim.

On completing his studies at the gymnasium he entered his father's cotton mills; there he occupied various positions until 1873, when the business was converted into a stock company, of whose board of directors he was president for several years. His leisure time was devoted to literature and music, and he was well known as a violoncello virtuoso. Porges founded the Prague Kammermusikvereins, and was also interested in the Deutsches Theater of that city. His philanthropy was extensive, the Josefstädter Kinderbewahranstalt, founded by his father, being an especial object of his benevolence.
