= Parente =

Parente is a surname in Italian, Spanish and Portuguese. Notable people with the surname include:

- Alison Swan Parente, English food educator
- Álvaro Parente, Portuguese racecar driver
- Angelo Parente, drummer for the band Motionless In White
- Carol-Lynn Parente, executive producer of Sesame Street
- Mario Parente, Canadian outlaw biker
- Nildo Parente, Brazilian actor
- Paulo César Arruda Parente, Brazilian footballer
- Pietro Parente (1891–1986), Italian theologian and cardinal
- Teresa Parente, American actress
- Tiago Parente (footballer, born 2004), Portuguese footballer
- Tiago Parente (footballer, born 2006), Portuguese footballer
- William Parente, New York real estate attorney
