= Aaron ben Benjamin Porges =

17th-century rabbi

Aaron ben Benjamin Porges (or Porjes) was a rabbi in Prague in the seventeenth century.

Under the title "Zik(h)ron Aharon" he wrote an introduction to the "Ḳiẓẓur Ma'abar Yabboḳ" of Aaron Berechiah of Modena, concerning the ancient Jewish customs relating to death and the dead, and containing also counsel for persons suffering from venereal disease. This work, published first at Prague in 1682, has been often reprinted. It was Porges's only published work.
