= Smíchov =

District of Prague, Czechia

- Cadastral Area of Prague
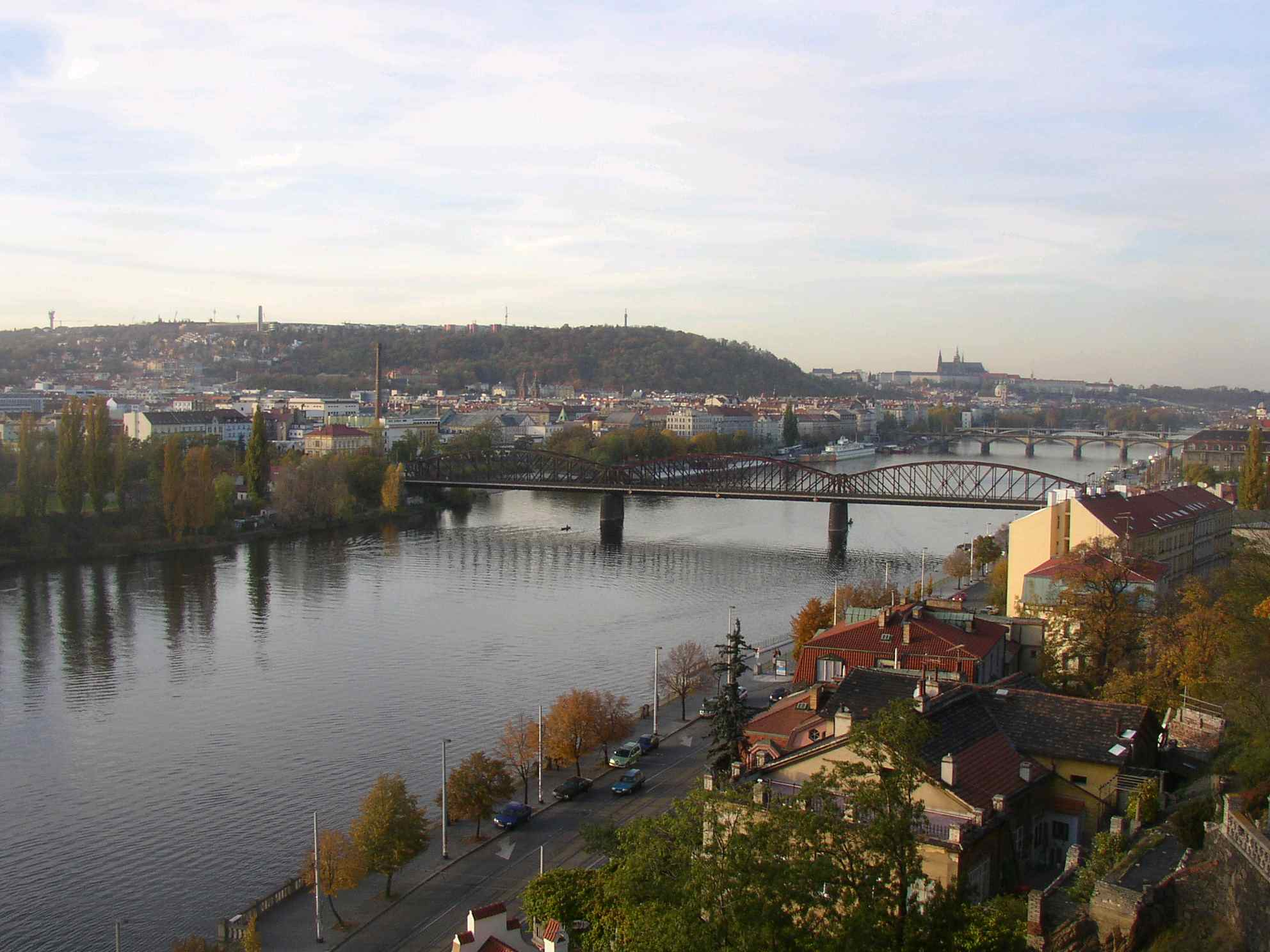
- Smíchov, on the left bank of the river Vltava as seen from Vyšehrad

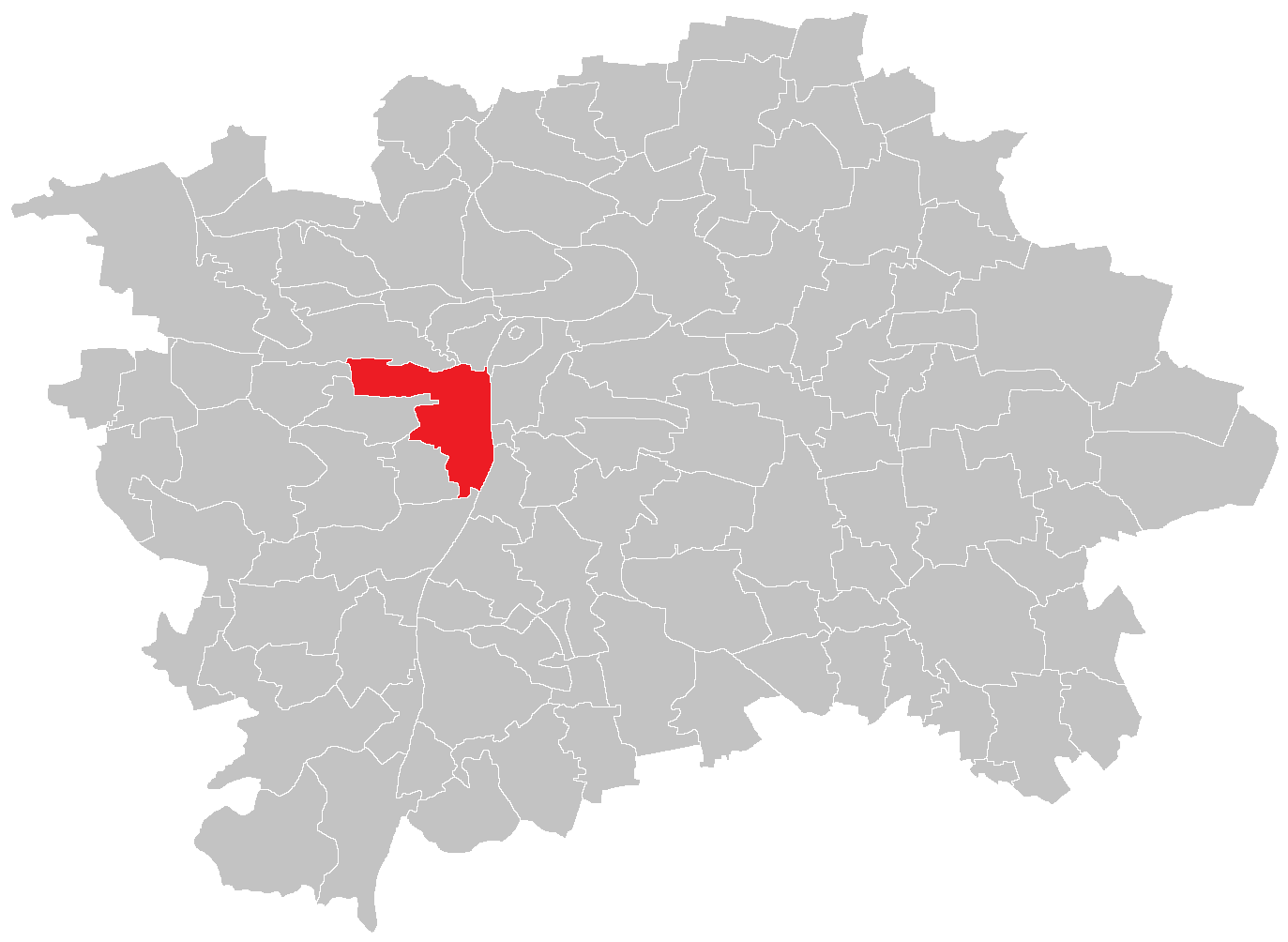
- Location of Smíchov in Prague
- Coordinates: 50°04′10″N 14°24′26″E
- Country: Czech Republic
- Region: Prague
- District: Prague 5

Area
  - Total: 7.05 km^{2} (2.72 sq mi)

Population (2021)
  - Total: 34,987
  - Density: 4,960/km^{2} (12,900/sq mi)
- Time zone: UTC+1 (CET)
  - Summer (DST): UTC+2 (CEST)

Smíchov (German: Smichow) has, since 1922, been a district and cadastral area of Prague, the capital of the Czech Republic, and is part of Prague 5. It is on the west bank of the Vltava river.

== History ==
It was only on 22 February 1903, that Smíchov was granted municipal government by Imperial decree and on 21 January 1904, Smíchov was granted a municipal coat of arms. In 1910 population of Smíchov was 51,791. After the First World War on the basis of the Act on Greater Prague, Smíchov was attached to Greater Prague in 1922 as part of its new urban district Prague XVI.

The Ringhoffer factory, founded in 1852 by railway magnate Baron Franz Ringhoffer (1817–1873) and nationalized after World War II, was part of one of the largest industrial enterprises of the Austro-Hungarian Empire (and later of Czechoslovakia). The Ringhoffer Works with more than 30,000 employees played a significant role in central European economy with global relevance, exporting railway carriages, cars (Tatra) and trucks across the world. The factory in Smíchov produced court trains and famous saloon cars for European rulers and after 1945 trams for the entire Eastern bloc. It was moved to Zličín in the 1990s and is now operated by Siemens. The buildings were demolished and replaced by a hypermarket, two multiplex cinemas, two hotels and several other commercial structures.

After the First World War the company based in Bohemia and Moravia held strong positions in Czechoslovak heavy metal industries. Under occupation by Nazi Germany the "Ringhoffer-Tatra" concern, consisting of wagon, automobile and electro-technical factories principally in Prague-Smíchov and Studenka (wagon construction), Koprivnice (Tatra-automobiles), Kolin and Ceska Lipa, succeeded in holding together despite attempts of the Hermann-Göring-Werke to absorb it. This struggle required a certain level of co-operation with the authorities of the "Third Reich". Ringhoffer-Tatra was nationalized and dissolved after the liberation and restoration of Czechoslovakia in 1945. The last owner and General Manager, Baron Hans (Hanus) Ringhoffer (1885–1946) died one year later in detention, the family was expelled without compensation.

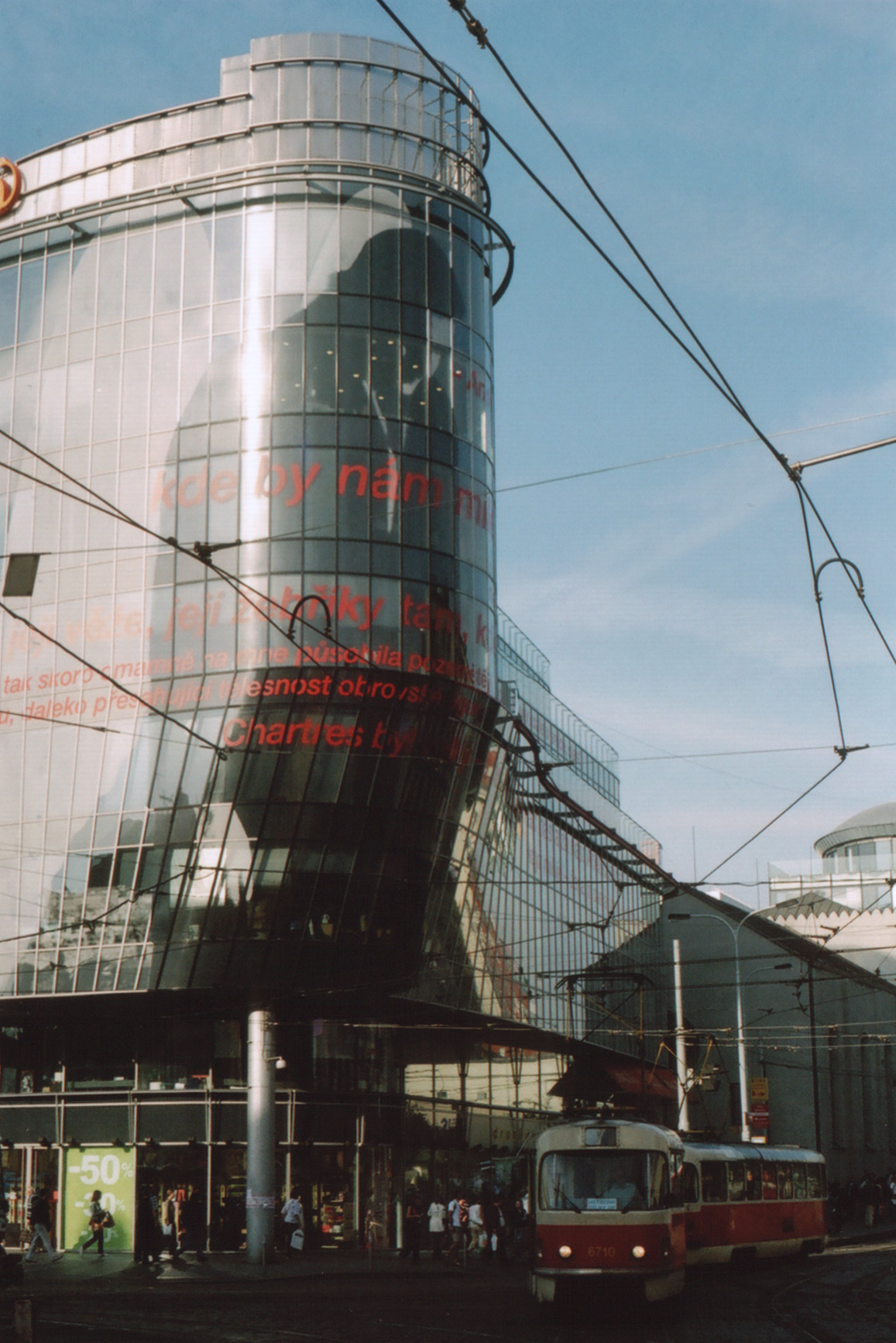
The angel on Jean Nouvel's building Golden Angel. The ČKD T3 tram was built in a factory located 100 meters from the crossing.

Founder of the firm was the coppersmith and inventor Franz Ringhoffer (1744–1827), native of Müllendorf (nowadays in the Austrian province of Burgenland near the Hungarian border), who arrived in Prague in 1769. He set up his workshop in the Old Town and produced brewery pans besides distillery and agrarian technical equipment. His son Joseph (1785–1847) established a hammer mill in Kamenice and extended the business by adapting it to the manufacture of special products for sugar factories and distilleries. Joseph's son Franz (II) (1817–1873), the first Baron Ringhoffer, obtained by government decree a concession for the manufacture of all categories of metal work and machinery for the whole country. He perceived the opportunity offered by railway development and started in 1852 the production of vehicles in Smichov, where he added an iron-foundry. The Works became the largest rolling-stock factory in the former Austrian Empire and then in Czechoslovakia.

Between 1945 and 1989, a monument dedicated to Soviet tanks in World War II, stood in Štefánik Square. The monument was removed shortly after the Velvet Revolution and a new glass-and-steel building designed by French architect Jean Nouvel became a symbol of the district. An angel (anděl in Czech) from Wim Wenders' movie Wings of Desire is etched into the glass on the façade. The local traffic hub was renamed to Anděl from Moskevská (after Moscow). The Staropramen brewery is located in Smíchov.

The area of the Smíchov railway station will be undergoing a major transformation, welcoming nearly 400 000 sqm of residential, administration, commercial and public space. The new development will be home to the new Smíchov Elementary school designed by Toronto-based Architecture firm Office Ou.

== Demographics ==
Historical population

Year	Pop.	±%
1869	15,382	—
1880	24,984	+62.4%
1890	32,646	+30.7%
1900	47,135	+44.4%
1910	51,791	+9.9%

Year	Pop.	±%
1921	56,249	+8.6%
1930	60,195	+7.0%
1950	61,854	+2.8%
1961	63,330	+2.4%
1970	55,623	−12.2%

Year	Pop.	±%
1980	49,309	−11.4%
1991	39,179	−20.5%
2001	33,624	−14.2%
2011	33,460	−0.5%
2021	34,987	+4.6%

Source: Censuses

== Education ==
The Lycée Français de Prague, the French international school, is in Smíchov.

== In popular culture ==
- 1995 – an escalator scene from Svěrák's Kolya was shot in Smíchov.
- 1999 – Vladimír Michálek's movie Angel Exit featured among others the half built Jean Nouvel building, the abandoned Jewish synagogue, the half-demolished Ringhoffer factory, St Wenceslas Church and the Bertramka cemetery.

== People ==
- Karl Egon Ebert, poet
- Moses Porges von Portheim, a Jewish mayor
- František Ringhoffer II. (1817–1873), baron, founder of the factory, mayor of Smíchov
- Ivan Puluj (1845–1918), a Ukrainian physicist and inventor, a professor (1884–1916) and a rector (1888–1889) of the Higher Technical School in Prague (German part)
- Rayko Daskalov (1886–1923), Bulgarian agrarian politician, was assassinated by an Internal Macedonian Revolutionary Organization (IMRO) associate in Smíchov
- Madeleine Albright, former United States Secretary of State (January 23, 1997 – January 20, 2001), first female to hold the post

== See also ==
- Dětský Island
- Railway line Prague-Smíchov–Hostivice
