= House of Vigil =

Asturian noble house

- Current region: Scattered around the world. Mostly in Spain, Morocco, United States and across Latin America.
- Origin: Kingdom of Asturias

The House of Vigil [biˈxil] is a noble family that first began in the Kingdom of Asturias around the 5th to 8th century. The family originated from the Asturian countryside as watchmen, gradually rising in prominence until they were one of the first families to achieve titles of nobility.

The Vigils produced two dukes of the Spanish Empire—Antonio Francisco Pimentel de Zúñiga y Vigil de Quiñones (10th Duke of Benavente), Francisco Alonso Pimentel Vigil de Quiñones Borja Aragón y Centelles (11th Duke of Benavente), and one president of the Federal Republic of Central America—Diego Vigil Cocaña.

== Sources ==
- Hobbs, Nicolas (2007). "Grandes de España" (in Spanish).
- Instituto de Salazar y Castro. Elenco de Grandezas y Titulos Nobiliarios Españoles (in Spanish). periodic publication.
