= Zuckerkandl =

Zuckerkandl is a surname. Notable people with the surname include:

- Berta Zuckerkandl (1864–1945), journalist, author, leader of an influential salon
- Emil Zuckerkandl (1849–1910), anatomist
- Emile Zuckerkandl (1922–2013), biologist, physiologist
- Otto Zuckerkandl (1861–1921), Austrian urologist and surgeon
- Victor Zuckerkandl (1896–1965), musicologist

== Other uses ==
- Zuckerkandl!, a 1968 comic book
- Zuckerkandl (film), a 1969 animated film

== See also ==
- Organ of Zuckerkandl, para-aortic catecholamine-secreting body
- Zucker (disambiguation)
- Zuckermann
