= Hevesi =

Hevesi (or Hevesy) is a Hungarian surname. The name derives from Heves, Hungary. Notable people with the surname include:

- Alan Hevesi (1940–2023), American politician from New York, brother of Dennis, father of Daniel and Andrew
- Andrew Hevesi (born 1973), American politician from New York, son of Alan, brother of Daniel
- Daniel Hevesi (born 1970), American politician from New York, son of Alan, brother of Andrew
- Dennis Hevesi, reporter for The New York Times, brother of Alan
- George de Hevesy (1885–1966), Hungarian chemist and Nobel Prize laureate
- Gyula Hevesi (1890–1970) Hungarian chemist, economist and politician
- Iván Hevesy (1893–1966) Hungarian art theorist
- Lajos Hevesi (1843–1910), Hungarian writer
