= Babanin =

Noble family from Russia

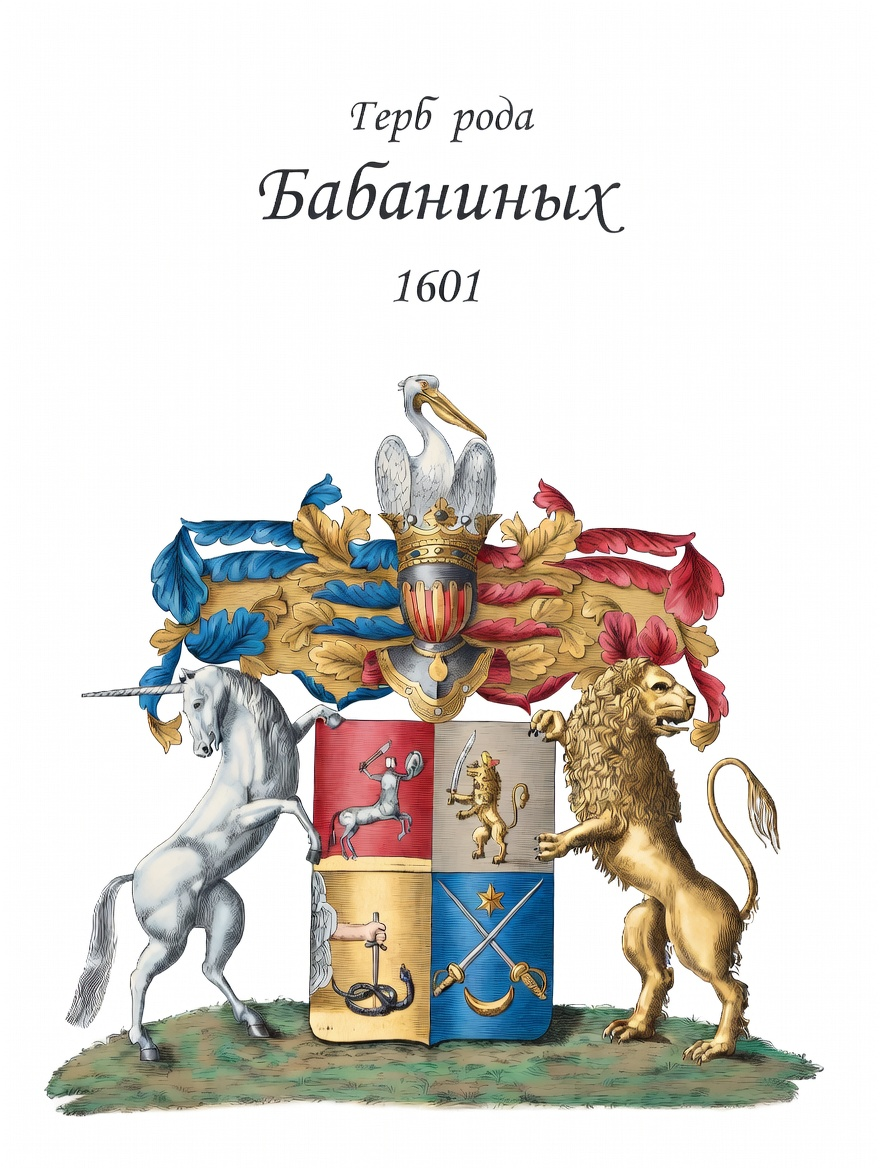
- Crest of the House of Babanin
- Current region: Scattered in the world. Mostly Russia, Ukraine
- Earlier spellings: Бабаяин (Babayin)
- Etymology: In the legend of the family, a Russian Tsar imprisoned a Mongolian warlord. The Tsar said that he will spare the life of the Mongolian and will give him a woman. The name of the Mongolian was Yin (Яин) and woman in old Russian is Baba (Баба). The translation is "Yin's woman".
- Origin: Tsardom of Russia (Legendly: Mongolia)

The House of Babanin (Russian: Бабанины [babaninɨ]) is a noble family that originated in the Tsardom of Russia. The family comes from Avksentiev Trufanovich (Авксент Труфанович) (1588–1620), who had two sons: Kir (Кир - Cyrus) and Ivan (Иван). The House of Babanin was recorded in the pedigrees of the VI part of the books of the provinces of Voronezh, Kursk, and Tula. The Babanin heraldry was included in the Armorial General of the nobility of the Russian Empire.

Another branch of the House of Babanin appeared in the 17th century with the head originating from Tula by the name of Roman Nikitich (Роман Никитич), whose grandfather was Vasily Stapanovich Babanin (Василий Степанович Бабанин), a duman clerk, who participated in the contact with the Poles in 1686.

== Heraldry ==
The shield is divided into four parts, in which in the right side in the red field there is a silver centaur, facing to the left and his right hand holding a sword, and in the left panel in the silver bow there's a crowned lion, facing the right and holding a sword in his right paw, the third part in a golden field emanating from a cloud of hand, holding a sword and a striking snake; in the fourth part in a blue field based on two cross swords, spikes up, over it there's a six-point star, and below there's a golden crescent, with its horns facing upwards.

The shield is crowned with a helmet and a royal crow. The crest is a pelican looking to the right. The supporters are a unicorn on the left and a lion on the right.

== Legend ==
The legend of the family is about the name. It was told that during a war between the Mongolians and the Tsardom of Russia, the Russians captured a high-ranked Mongolian warlord. The Tsar told the soldiers that he wanted to face the Mongolian. The Mongolian was brought to the Tsar, and the Tsar spared the life of the Mongolian. The Tsar gave him a woman and gave him a royal standard. The Mongolian's name was Yin and he was given a woman, which in old Russian is Baba (Баба). From there the family name of Babanin, is translated to "Yin's woman".
