= Francisco Lopes Suasso =

Dutch-Sephardi Jewish banker (1657–1710)

- Portrait of Francisco Lopes Suasso, by Nicolaes Maes
- Born: Amsterdam, Dutch Republic
- Died: April 22, 1710 (aged 52–53); The Hague, Dutch Republic

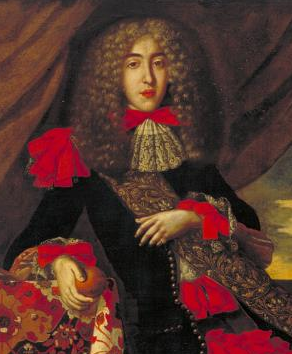
Suasso as a young man

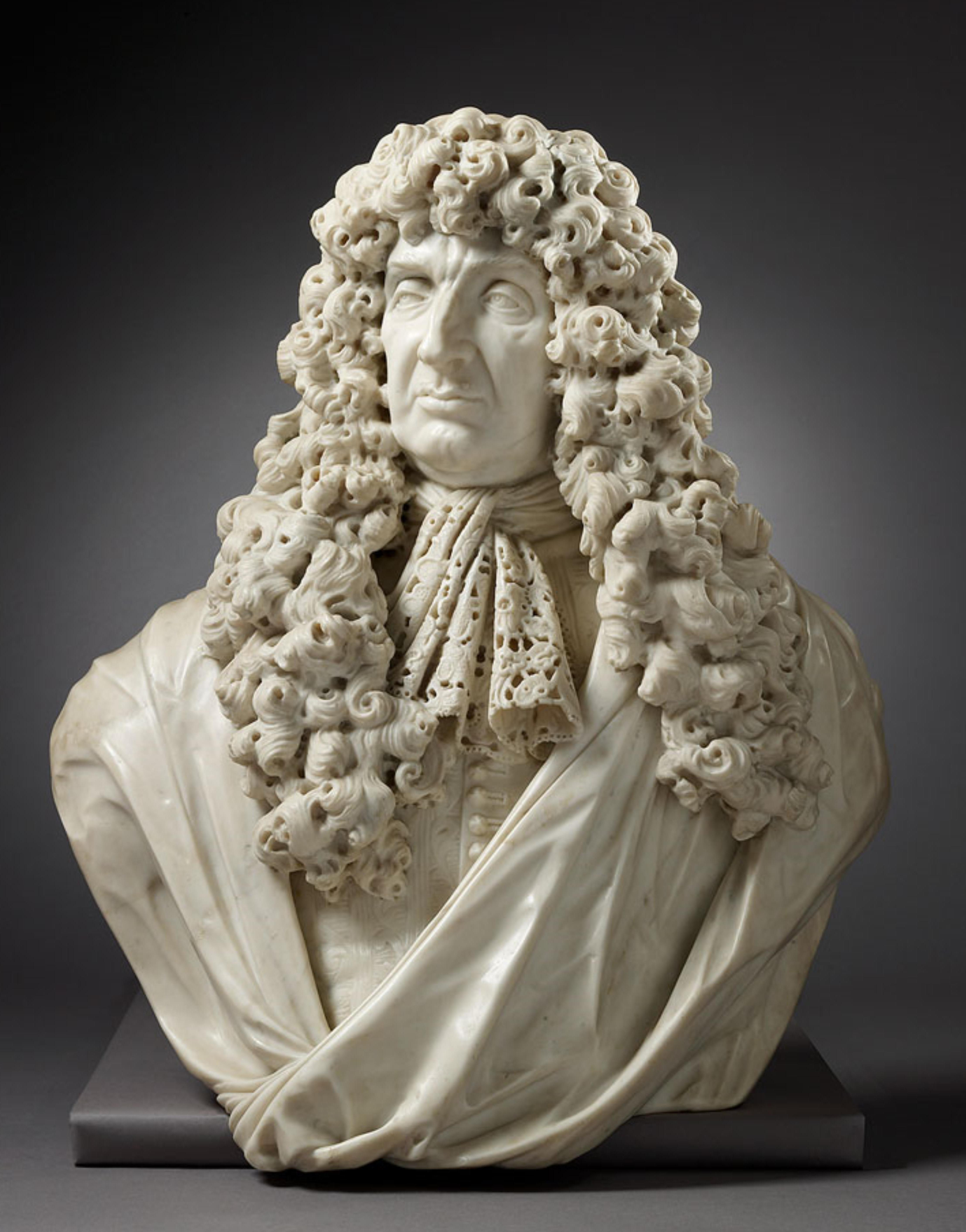
Bust of Antonio Lopes Suasso by Rombout Verhulst

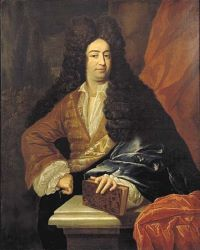
Suasso in a portrait of ca. 1700

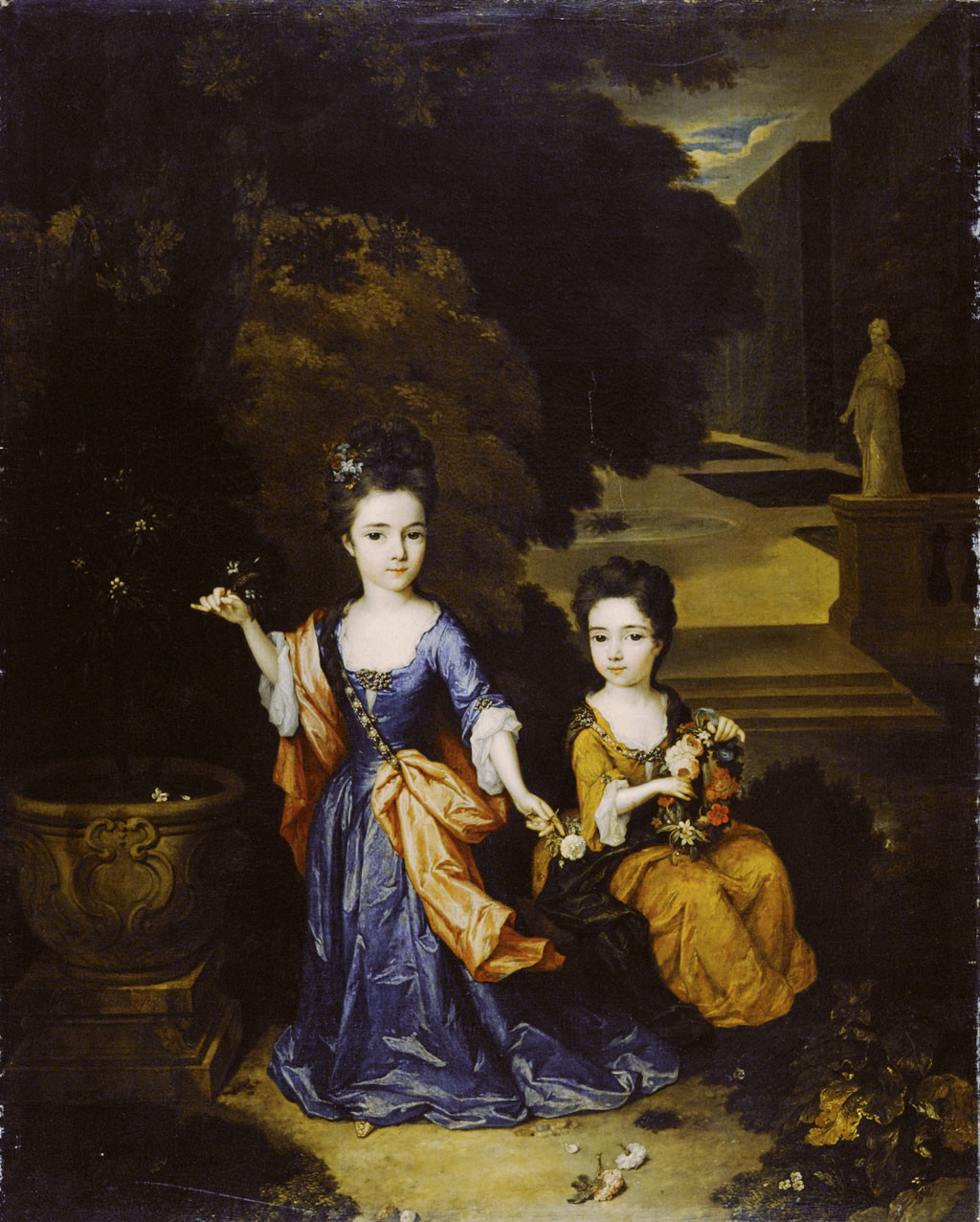
Two daughters of Francisco Lopez Suasso

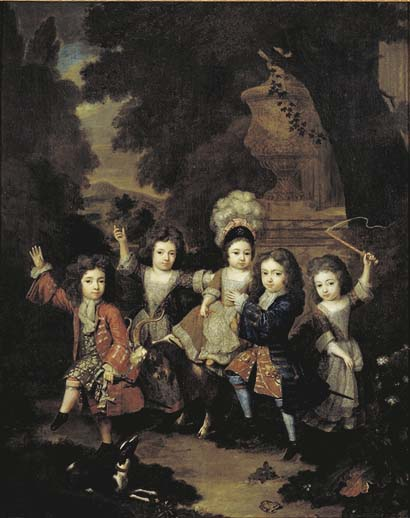
Five of Suasso's children, c. 1709

Francisco Lopes Suasso, second Baron d'Avernas le Gras (c. 1657 – 22 April 1710) was a banker and financier of the Dutch Republic. He was also known within the Sephardic Jewish community as Abraham Israel Suasso.

== Background and early life ==
After being expelled from the Iberian Peninsula, most of the Sephardic Jews settled in trading cities such as London and Antwerp. By the late sixteenth century during the Dutch Golden Age they were arriving in Amsterdam and The Hague. The Lopes Suassos were a wealthy old Sephardic family of Marranos, or Jews who had been forced to convert to Christianity under pressure from the Portuguese Inquisition, but once in Amsterdam they openly returned to their true religion, Judaism.

Suasso was born in Amsterdam, the eldest son of the merchant/banker Antonio Lopes Suasso (1614–1685), also known as Isaac Israel Suasso, by his marriage in 1654 to Rachel (Violenta) de Pinto, a member of another rich old Sephardic family. His father, who had himself been born in Bordeaux, was one of the richest and most famous Portuguese-Jewish merchants in the Amsterdam of his day. He lived at Jodenbreestraat and Groenburgwal trading on Málaga and Hamburg. The date of Francisco's birth, probably between 1657 and 1660, is uncertain.

He had four sisters, Ribca (1655–1695), Rachel (1659–1685), Elisheba (1663–1746) and Esther (1669–1679), as well as a younger brother, Jacob, who died young.

The family retained a sense of belonging to Spain, and on 3 January 1676 Suasso's father received from Charles II of Spain the title of Baron d'Avernas le Gras in recognition of his diplomatic services. The title was drawn from a seigneurie owned by Suasso in the Duchy of Brabant named Avernas le Gras. He also had a good relationship with the Stadtholders, and the banking house of Suasso often supported them financially.

== Life ==
Suasso joined his father's banking business. He continued a successful banking career after the death of his father in 1685, when he inherited half of his father's considerable fortune, much of which was in the form of shares in the Dutch East India Company (Chamber of Middelburg).

In 1682, Suasso married firstly Judith Francisco Teixeira, at Hamburg. She was the daughter of the banker Manuel (otherwise Isaac) Teixeira, who after Suasso's father and De Pinto was the third most important Portuguese-Jewish merchant-banker in Northern Europe, by his marriage to Beatrix Nunes Henriques. In an age of strategic marriages, the union can be seen as intended to raise capital within a narrow circle, but this design was thwarted when Judith died childless in 1689.

A notable instance of the support of the house of Suasso to the Dutch stadtholders is the loan of two million guilders which Suasso made to William of Orange in 1688 in support of his invasion of England to claim the thrones of King James II. The story is told that William asked Suasso what he wanted as collateral for the millions, to which Suasso replied: "If thou art felicitous, I know thou wilt return them to me; art thou infelicitous, I agree to having lost them." However, this may be apocryphal. Suasso was responsible for a number of elements of the invasion, and through his father-in-law in Hamburg he was able to make speedy arrangements for the transport of Swedish and Pomeranian troops provided in November 1688 by Charles XI of Sweden to assist William. The coffer in which William repaid the loan to Suasso is today on display in the Willet-Holthuysen Museum in Amsterdam.

Following the death of his first wife in 1689, on 23 February 1694 Suasso married secondly, at The Hague, Leonora (otherwise Rachel) da Costa (1669–1749), and with her had ten children, who became part of a large family network. Their seven sons were Antonio (1695–1775), Alvaro (1696–1751), Manuel (1698–1773), Pedro (1700–1742), Jeronimo (1702–1740), David (1703–1705), and Francisco (1710–1770), while their three daughters were Leonora (1701–1754), Sara (1706–1767) and Hanna (1708–1721).

Suasso died in The Hague on 22 April 1710, in his early fifties. He was buried in the Portuguese-Jewish cemetery called Beth Haim at Ouderkerk aan de Amstel. He was succeeded in his business and as Baron d'Avernas le Gras by his eldest son, Antonio Lopes Suasso the Younger, alias Isaac Lopes Suasso (1695–1775).
