= Moses Porges von Portheim =

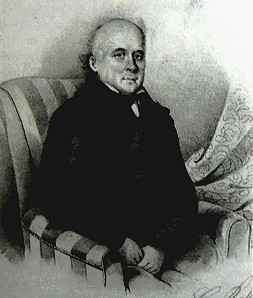
- Born: 22 December 1781; Prague, Bohemia, Habsburg monarchy
- Died: 21 May 1870 (aged 88); Smíchov, Bohemia, Austria-Hungary
- Occupations: industrialist and vice-burgomaster of Smíchov
- Awards: knight of the Order of Franz Joseph

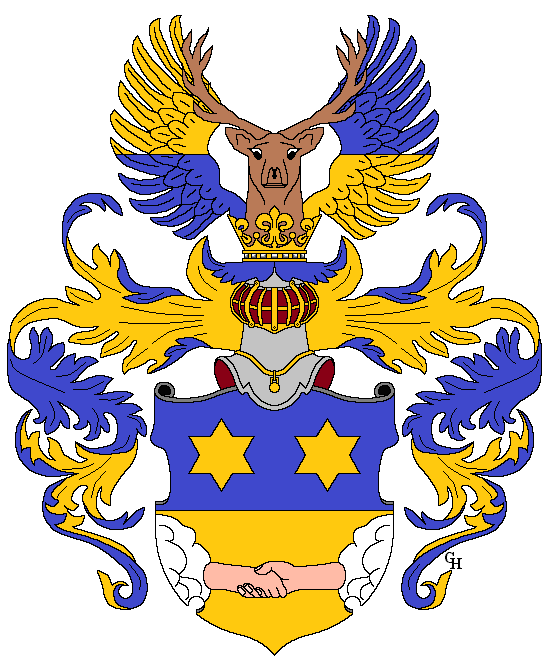
Coat of arms von Portheim family from 1841

Moses Porges, Edler von Portheim (22 December 1781 – 21 May 1870) was a Czech-Austrian industrialist and vice-burgomaster of Smíchov. He was knight of the Order of Franz Joseph.

== Life ==
He was born on 22 December 1781 in Prague, Bohemia. He was one of the earliest and most prominent of the large manufacturers of Austria, and was very closely associated with his younger brother, Leopold Judah Porges. Moses and Leopold, the sons of the highly respected but poor Gabriel Porges of the Spira family, experienced adventures in the camp of the sectarian Jacob Frank at Offenbach which have been described by Heinrich Graetz in his Frank und die Frankisten (1868) and his Gesch, and in greater detail by Dr. S. Back in Monatsschrift (1877, pp. 190). Disillusioned, they returned to Prague, and began a small linen business, and in 1808 commenced, with a single cotton-printing press and in a dark shop on the Vltava, an industrial activity which was destined later to reach great dimensions.

In 1830 the rapidly growing business was transferred to the suburb of Smíchov, where it developed into one of the largest establishments of the Austrian monarchy, and in 1841 the emperor Ferdinand I of Austria conferred upon the brothers the patent of hereditary nobility with the title "von Portheim", in recognition of the fact that they were the first cotton-manufacturers to employ steam in their works. When this patent had been offered Moses in the previous year, he asked the Supreme Burgrave of Bohemia Karl, Count Chotek of Chotkow and Wognin for a decree of emancipation of the Jews instead, but this request was not granted. Moses later purchased and operated the porcelain factory at Chodov together with the mines belonging to it, and after the passage of the laws of 1861 he and his brother entered politics, the latter being elected to the diet, while the former officiated for several years as vice-burgomaster of Prague-Smíchov. The most noteworthy among the numerous benefactions of Moses Porges is the still existing crèche, which, without distinction of creed or nationality, for eight months of the year, receives and cares for 150 children daily while their parents are at work.

Towards the end of his life Moses Porges wrote memoirs of his adventures at Offenbach.

The life of Moses Porges is part of the plot of the historical novel Harfeník by Jiří Weil.
