= Elevated entrance =

Entrance of medieval castles

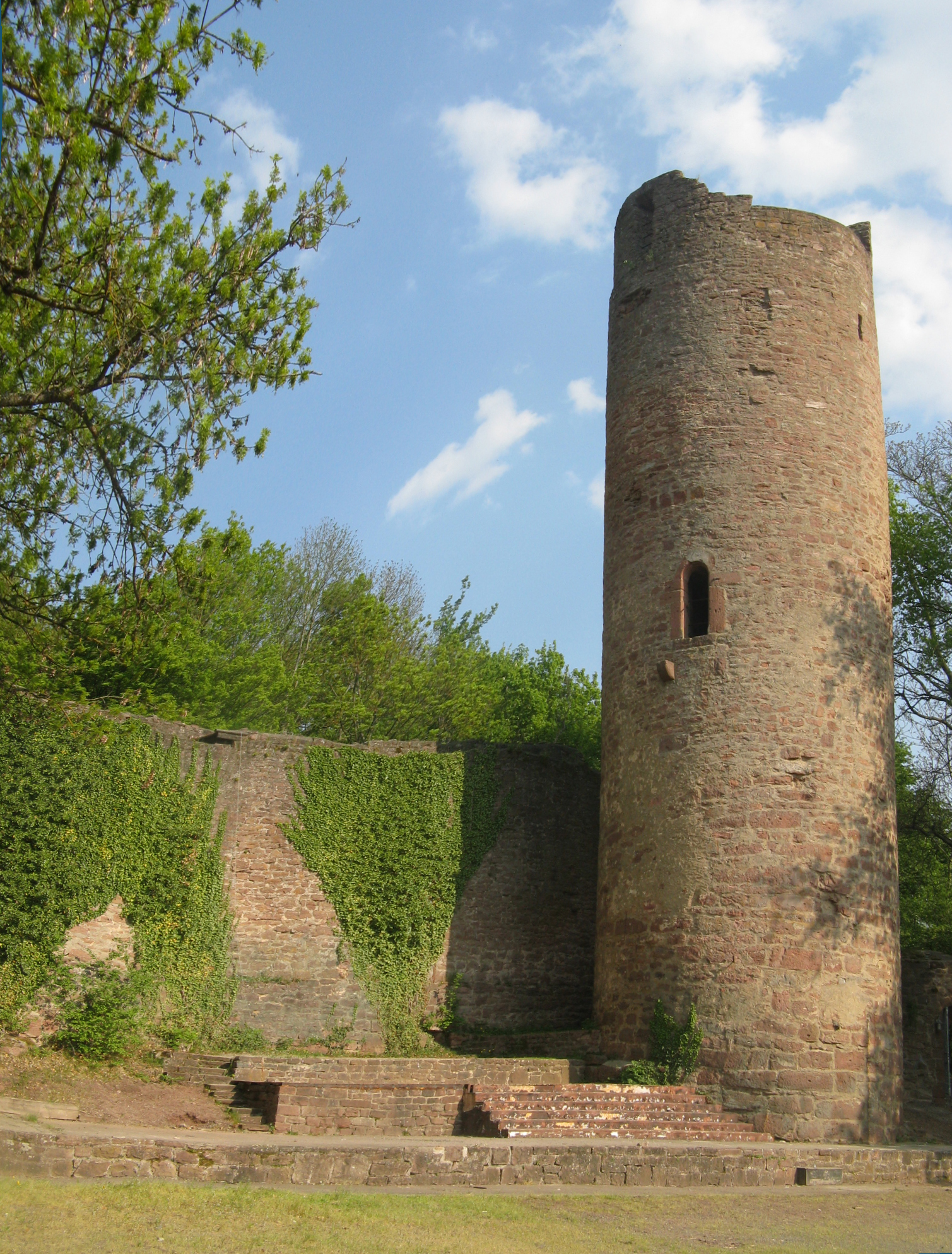
Elevated entrance of the bergfried of Scherenburg Castle

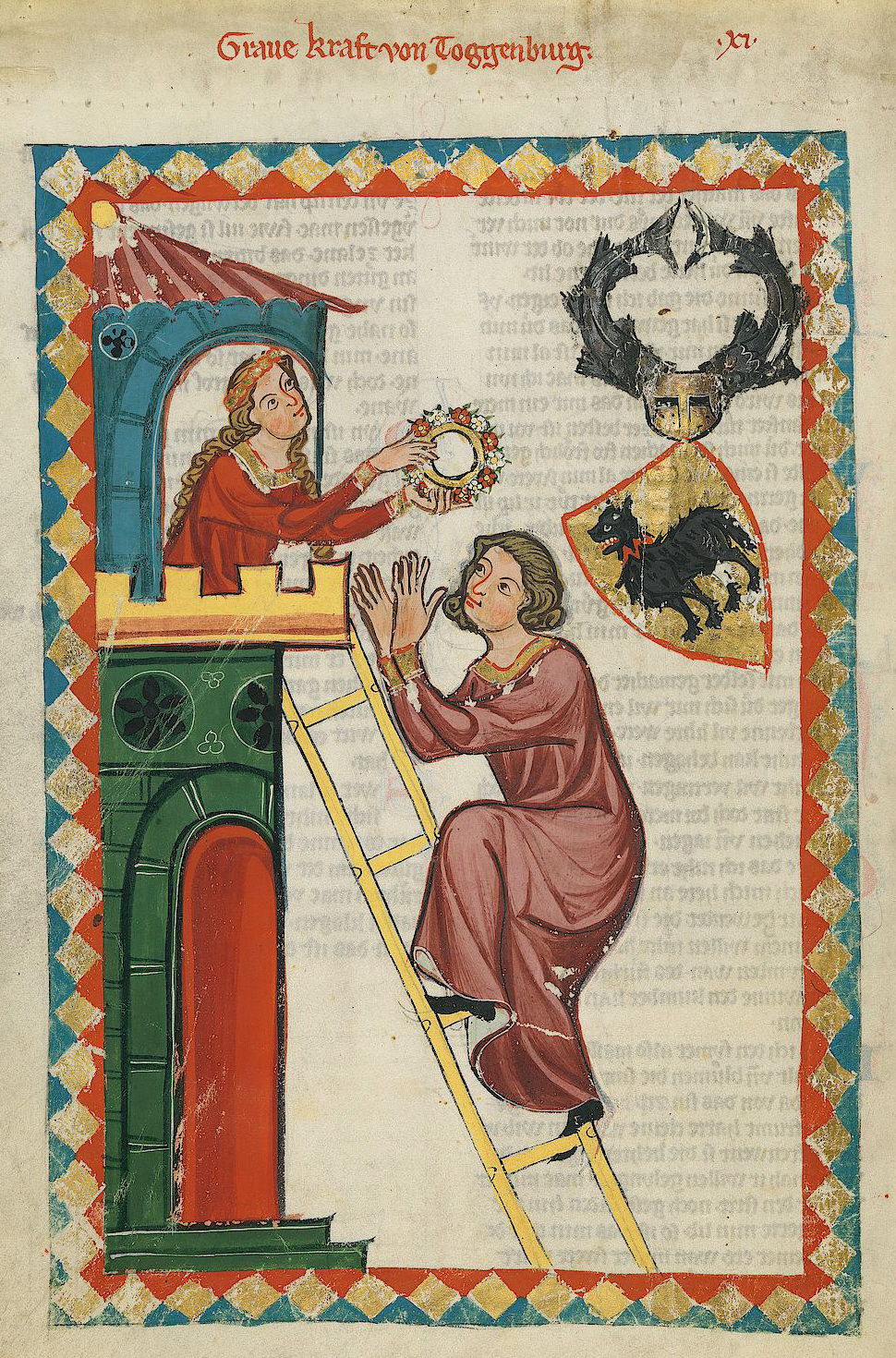
Ascent by wooden ladder (Codex Manesse)

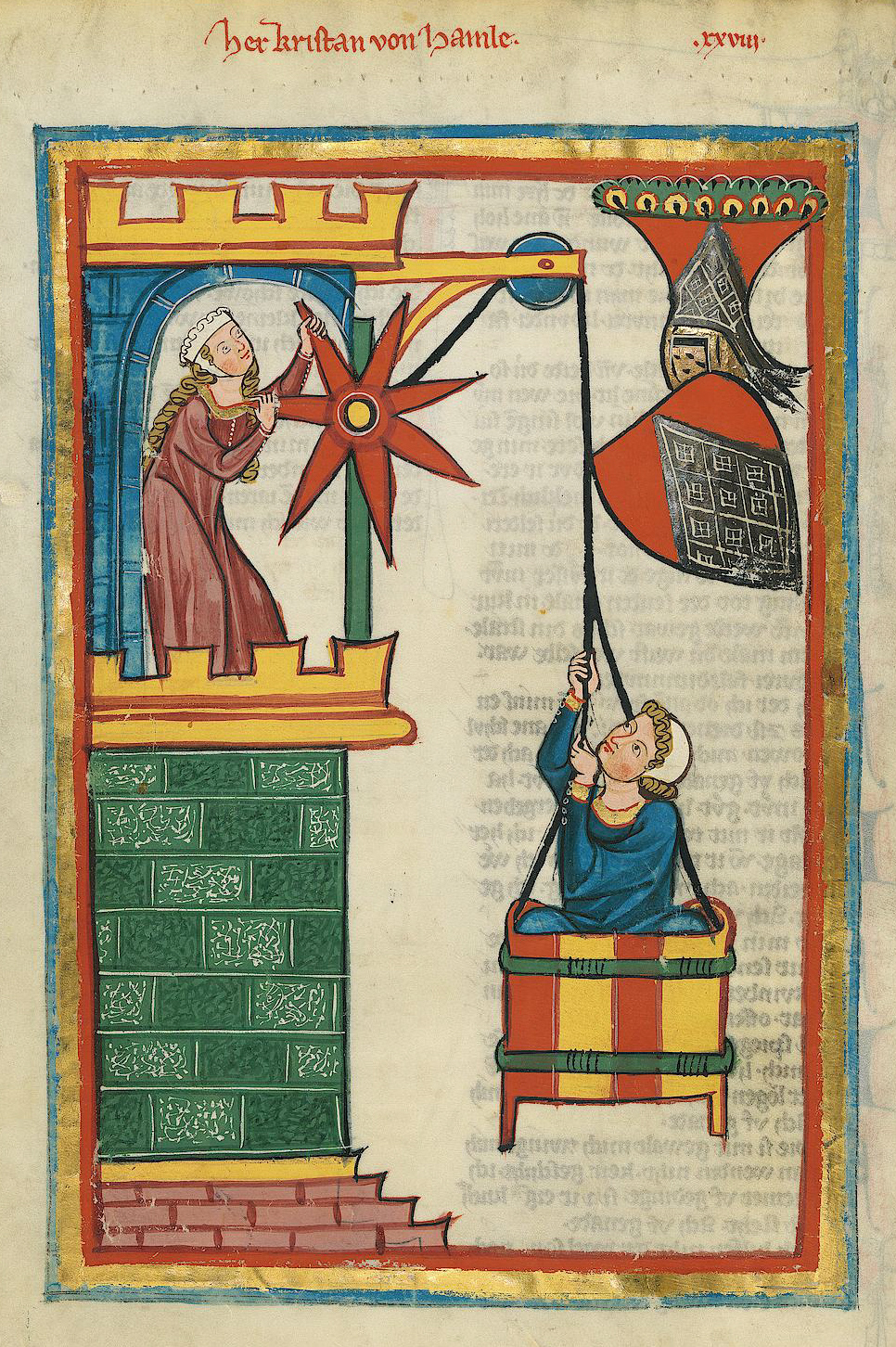
The rope lift as a means of entry (Codex Manesse)

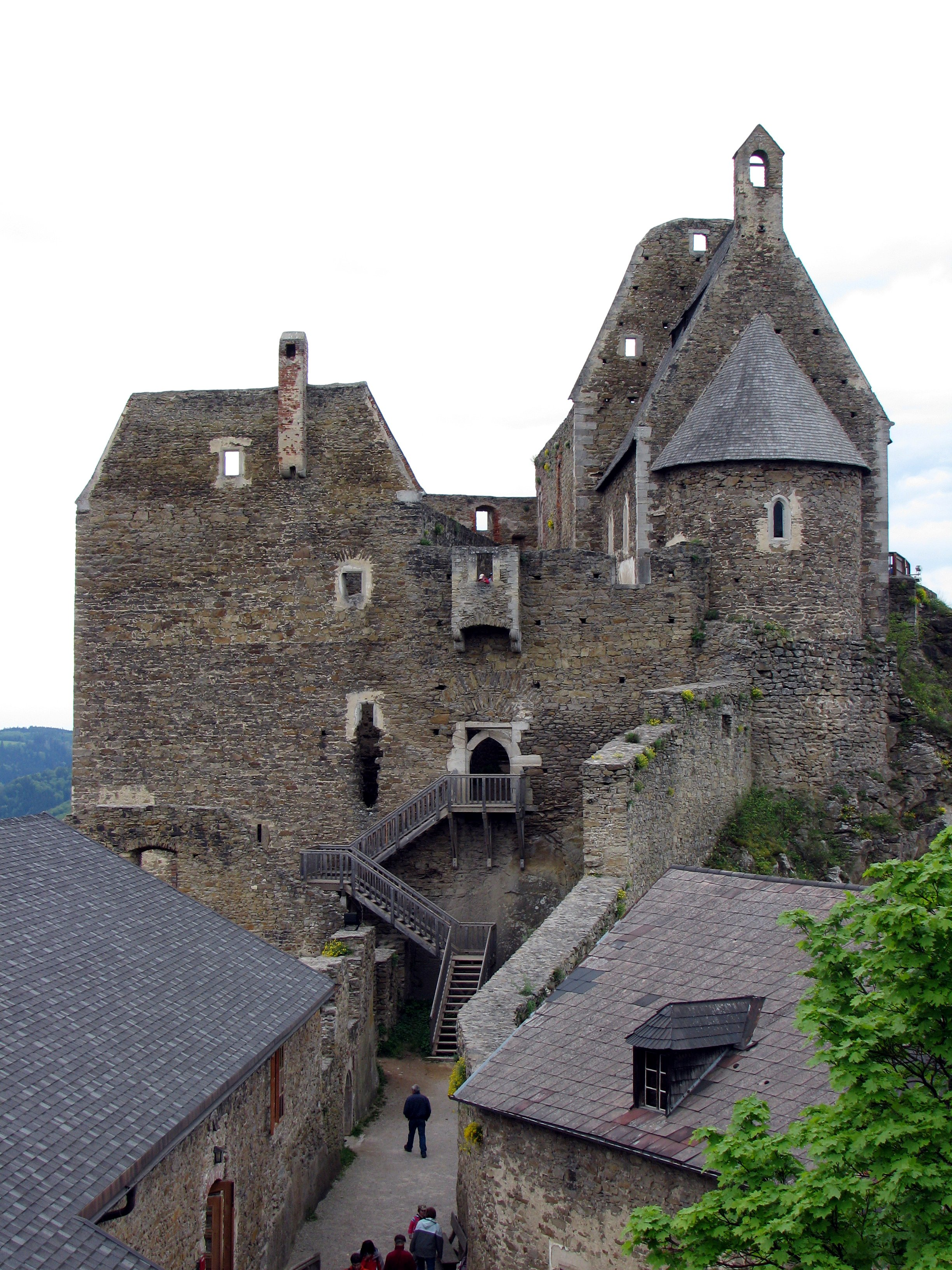
The inner ward of Aggstein Castle above the Danube

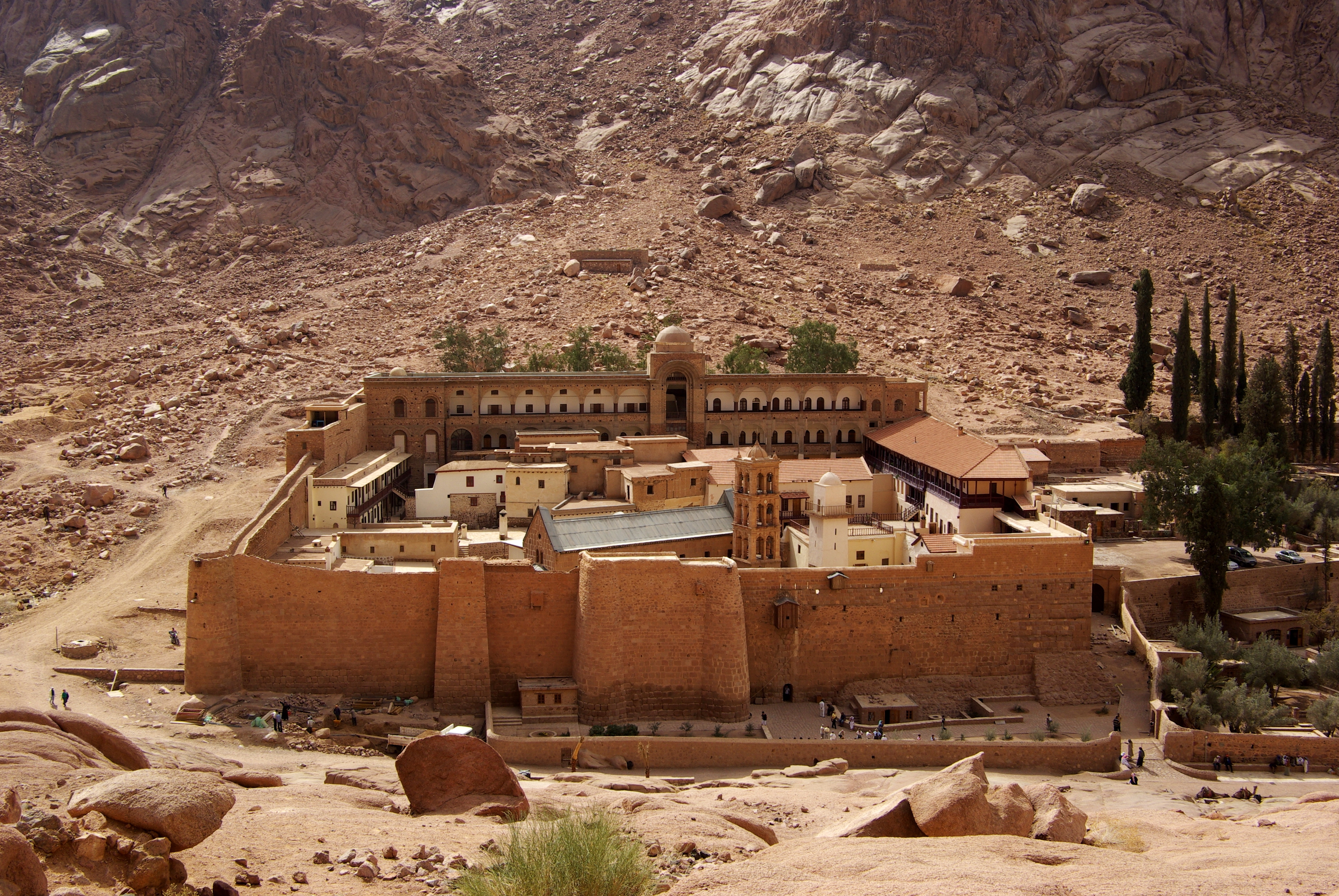
St. Catherine's Monastery on Mount Sinai. The wooden oriel for the rope lift is visible above the modern entrance

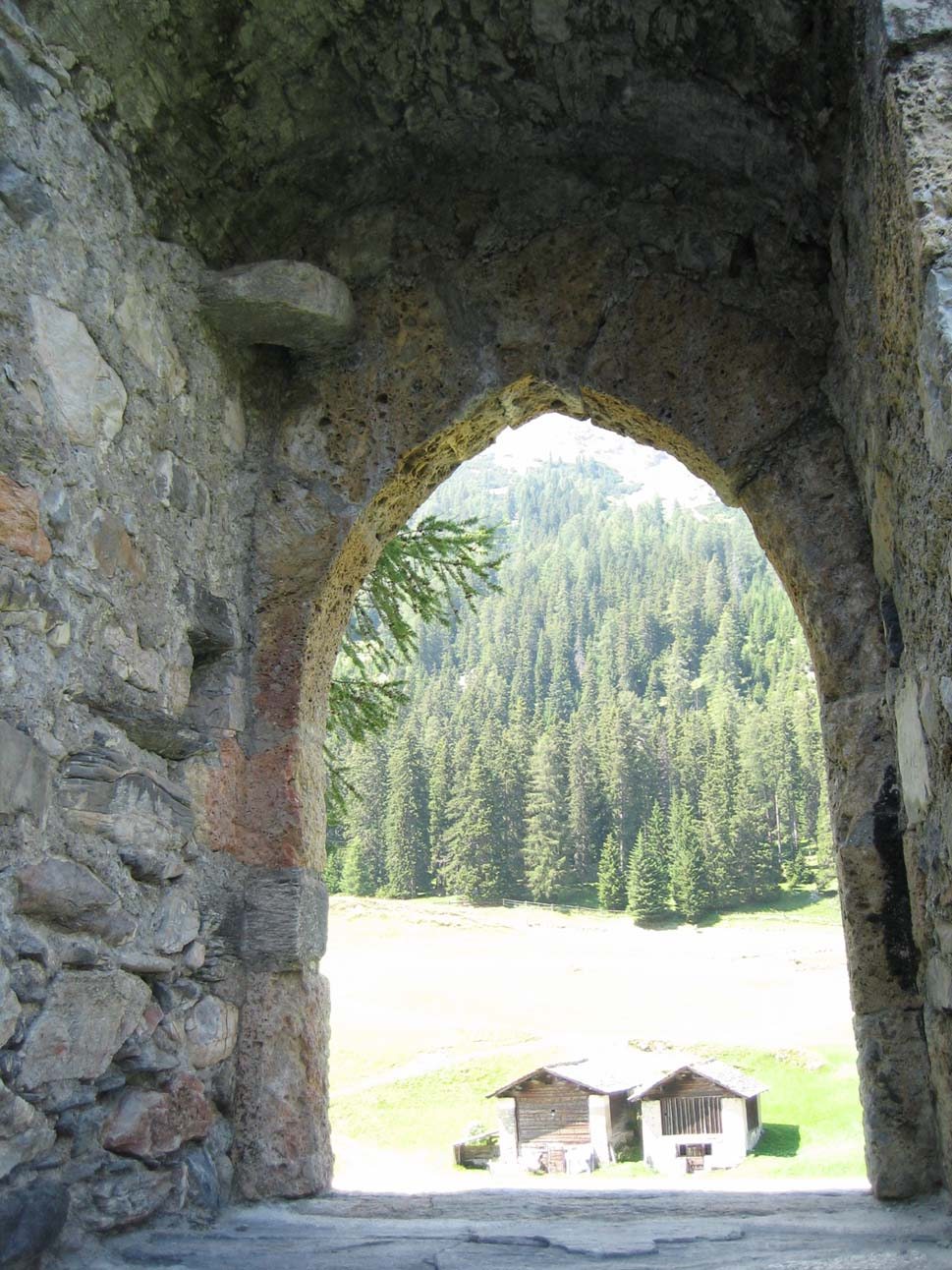
View of the inside of the elevated entrance of Splügen Castle (Graubünden) showing the trunnion of the door fixture and the groove for the locking bar

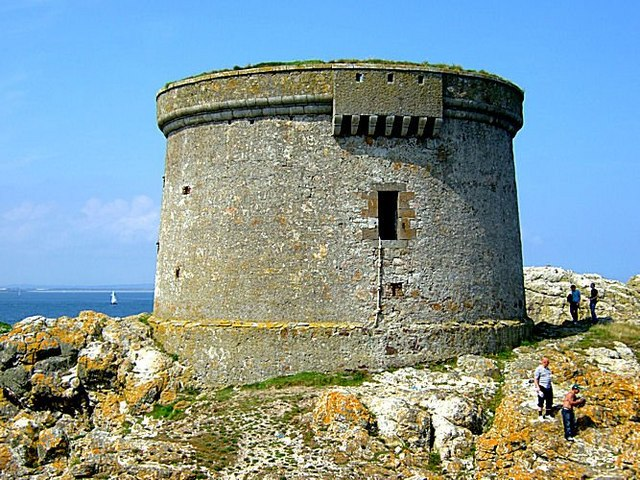
A martello tower of the early 19th century on the Irish coast

An elevated entrance is a type of entrance, common in the design of medieval castles, that is not accessible from ground level, but lies at the level of an upper storey. The elevated entrance is the lowest and frequently the only way of entering a fortified building or residence. In the case of circular towers, a large opening in the main wall at ground level was a potential weakness and experts on castle design have argued that the elevated entrance served a structural as well as defensive purpose.

Elevated entrances were also used in Antiquity. For example, the numerous limes watchtowers only had this type of entrance.

== The elevated entrance in medieval castles ==
The majority of elevated entrances were between five and ten metres above the ground level and facing the courtyard side in order to protect them from shell fire. Several examples were located in rather unsuitable places, however, for example above the outside of a castle. Heights of above 15 metres are only rarely recorded. The entrance was usually only accessible from another building in the nearby vicinity, some of which remain archaeologically discernible. Many elevated entrances today are only two to three metres above the ground because the original ground level, often several metres lower, has been filled with building rubble.

The elevated entrance was usually reached on a wooden or stone staircase or from a footbridge from another part of the building. Immediately in front of the entrance there was usually a wooden platform; on particularly long stairways there could be intermediate landings. A steep stairway and narrow landing in front of the entrance made it difficult for attackers to use heavy demolition equipment such as battering rams. Below the entranceway the corbels or putlog holes have often survived. Even the fixtures of the original wooden stairways are frequently still visible. In several cases, elevated entranceways built in the Late Middle Ages or Early Modern times were accessed by staircase towers with spiral staircases.

Occasionally an elevated entrance was also guarded by a small drawbridge. Wooden stairways were often protected from the weather by a porch. Such a structure is shown in a 1449 votive picture by the Bavarian castle builder (Burgpfleger), Bernd von Seyboltsdorf (Schärding, Upper Austria). The entrance of the oriel opens at the side and access is gained over a wooden staircase, complete with railings, that is clearly firmly fixed.

The simplest form of access was a movable ladder that could quickly be hauled up in the event of attack. In permanently occupied castles, however, this type of access was hardly ever used. Certainly rope ladders were occasionally used. Having a rope ladder or even a simple rope ready would make sense if a longer wooden ladder could not be hauled into the building. Several authors even suggest that rope ladders could have been the most common means of entering and leaving the building (Hans Max von Aufseß).

A miniature in the Codex Manesse shows how the poet Kristan von Hamle is hoisted in a basket up to an elevated entrance by a woman with the help of a rope. This is representative of a common motif that is particularly well known from the Virgil Legends of the Middle Ages (Vergil in the Basket). The lady loved by Virgil promises to meet him at night in her tower room, hauling him up to her room in a basket. However, she deliberately leaves the basket hanging half way up and the jilted Virgil becomes the laughing stock of the local people the following morning when they see him there. The German sayings "to leave someone hanging in the air" (jemanden in der Luft hängen lassen) and "to give someone a basket" (einen Korb geben) probably go back to this legend. Whether rope lifts of this sort were widely used, either for goods or to lift people, is not clear.

In the more recent castle science literature the rope lift is rarely seen as a method of reaching an elevated entrance.

In the 19th century, August Essenwein saw the rope lift as a common entry system. For example, in his numerous artist's impressions of medieval castles, people can often be seen being hauled up towers using a simple lift. The castle researcher, Otto Piper questioned this, however, in his well-known work, Burgenkunde, because in the case of danger the use of such a lift was impractical in his opinion and in any case would always need a second person in the tower to operate the lift. But he also recognised the problem of hauling up a long, wooden ladder into an elevated entrance. His view was that they would make do with a fixed wooden or stone structure at the foot of the building. A short, easily retrievable, wooden ladder could then be used to reach the elevated entrance.

Several early castle researchers deduced from that, that long wooden ladders which could not be stowed within the building, were hauled up and fixed to the external wall (Karl August von Cohausen).

What is verifiable is the use of lifting devices for elevated entrances in a few examples from Orthodox culture. Well preserved is the wooden rope lift oriel of the St. Catherine's Monastery on Mount Sinai which, until the 20th century, was the only entrance to the heavily fortified monastery castle. Here the actual lift systems is, however, inside the building behind it. The winch had to be worked by four monks simultaneously. The elevated entrance was used here primarily as a defence against Bedouin raids.

Considerably more spectacular are the rope lifts to the monasteries and hermitages around the holy mountain of Athos, some of which are still accessible today using these means. The 20 large monasteries also had gateways, however. Several Egyptian monasteries also used to be only accessible using lifts. The longest rope lifts led to the Meteora abbeys of Northern Greece. These systems were built on mighty rock towers; so they were not classic elevated entrances. These examples show that small winches could also have been installed in the wooden structures of medieval elevated entrances. There is no record, however, of lift equipment in the interior of the building.

In individual cases it is possible that the construction cranes for a tower or building were left in place and used after the structure was completed. A picture in the Weltchronik by Rudolf von Ems (1340) shows two such load-carrying cranes. One is being worked using a winch, the other using a pulley wheel. A medieval construction crane with a pulley was reconstructed at the Alsace castle of Fleckenstein and set on an elevated opening in the rock face of the inner ward. The depiction in the Weltchronik also shows material being carried up a wooden ladder.

Normally the entrances were so narrow and the lintels so low that only one person at a time could enter the interior of the building or tower. The elevated entrance of Tirol Castle is, however, about 1.25 metres wide and over three metres high. The gateways are generally designed as round arches, more rarely as Gothic arches. Late medieval entrances sometimes have straight or stepped lintels and even trefoil arches (e.g. Kronsegg Castle, Lower Austria). The door frames are usually very plain, but sometimes beading is used to decorate the frame. Coats of arms and the year of construction date to no earlier than the Late Middle Ages.

Wooden entrance doors were sometimes clad with iron or slate in order to reduce the risk of fire. Original doors from the Middle Ages have rarely survived however. On the inside the gateways were usually secured with locking beams.

Sometimes the entrances to entire groups of buildings or sections of a castle were protected by being elevated. For example, the gate to the inner ward at the fortress of Aggstein (in Wachau) is about six metres above the level of the courtyard of the outer ward. At the Küssaburg in Baden, the gate of the inner ward is four metres above the ground and was probably reached using a wooden ramp.

There are also examples of castles in the Near East and the Caucasus that have raised entrances. The function of the external gateway on the 5th floor of the Maiden Tower in Baku is still a mystery today. Wall and vault remains on the ground could point to a structure providing access, such as a staircase, which has since been demolished.

== Function and symbolism ==
An elevated entrance fulfilled two functions: firstly, it protected the building's occupants and, secondly, the castellan could invite visitors into the domestic area of the castle. In the lower, often dimly lit floor, supplies, equipment and materiel were often stored. Ground-level openings in ruins that may be seen here and there today were, in many cases, where the lower floor was subsequently broken into but were not there originally.

In bergfrieds and country churches the elevated entrance offered protection against attackers. At the same time, the difficulty of access was also a disadvantage; for example, any counter-offensive defence of the castle was more problematic. From an elevated entrance it was only really possible to fire on attackers as they fled. Nevertheless, several researchers see passive defence as one of the important functions of a bergfried. According to this school of thought, they mainly wanted to prevent attackers breaking in. This gained valuable time to enable a relief to arrive or for a more favourable situation to be achieved.

Occasionally the elevated entrance had more of a symbolic than a practical function. For example, the medieval archaeologist, Joachim Zeune, this form of entrance, was an evolutionary "spin off" and could be interpreted more as a symbol of medieval secular power.

Various types of elevated entrance are also found on watchtowers (e.g. in Luginsland) and tower houses, French donjons, English keeps or Spanish torre del homenaje. In addition, several Early Modern and Baroque fortifications have elevated entrances. For example, the entrance to the ravelin in front of Bishop Gemmingen's schloss at the Willibaldsburg above Eichstätt is several metres above the height of the moat, for security reasons.

Even in the time of the Napoleonic Wars the 164 Martello towers of the British Empire were accessed by elevated entrances. These small openings were often further protected by defensive bretèches above them.

== Examples ==
- Aggstein Castle, Austria
- Caernarvon Castle, Wales - Queen's Gate
- Saint Catherine's Monastery, Sinai
- Gilling Castle, England
- Gulbarga Castle, India
- Jörgenberg Castle, Germany
- Scherenburg Castle, Germany
- Splügen Castle, Switzerland

== Gallery ==
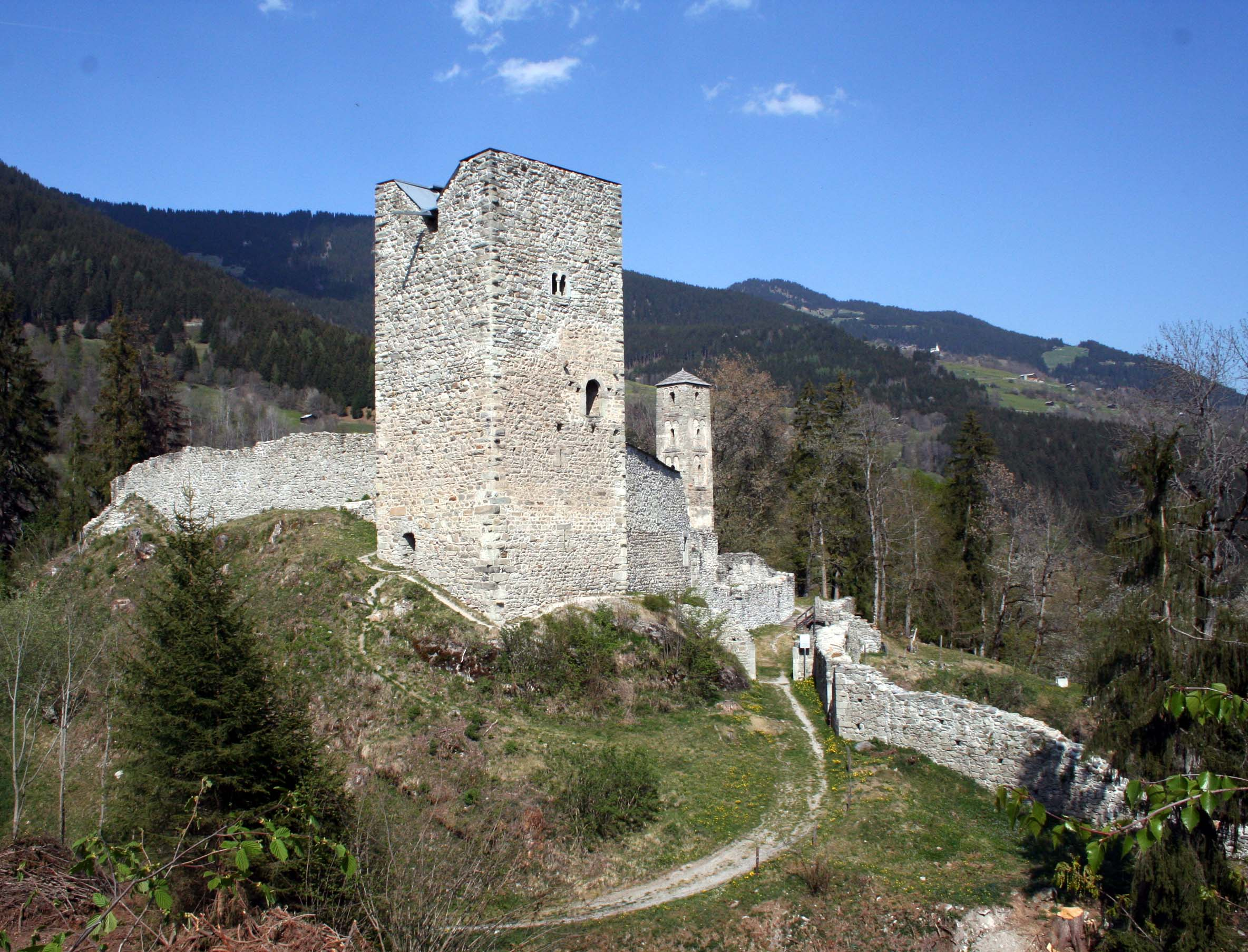
The bergfried of Jörgenberg Castle with its elevated entrance

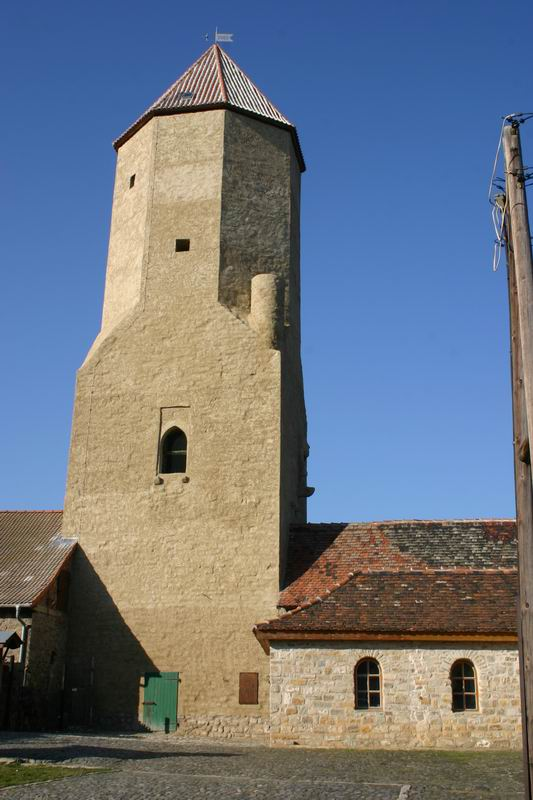
The bergfried of Freckleben Castle: the hinge stones (Scharniersteine) and recess for the drawbridge on the elevated entrance have survived

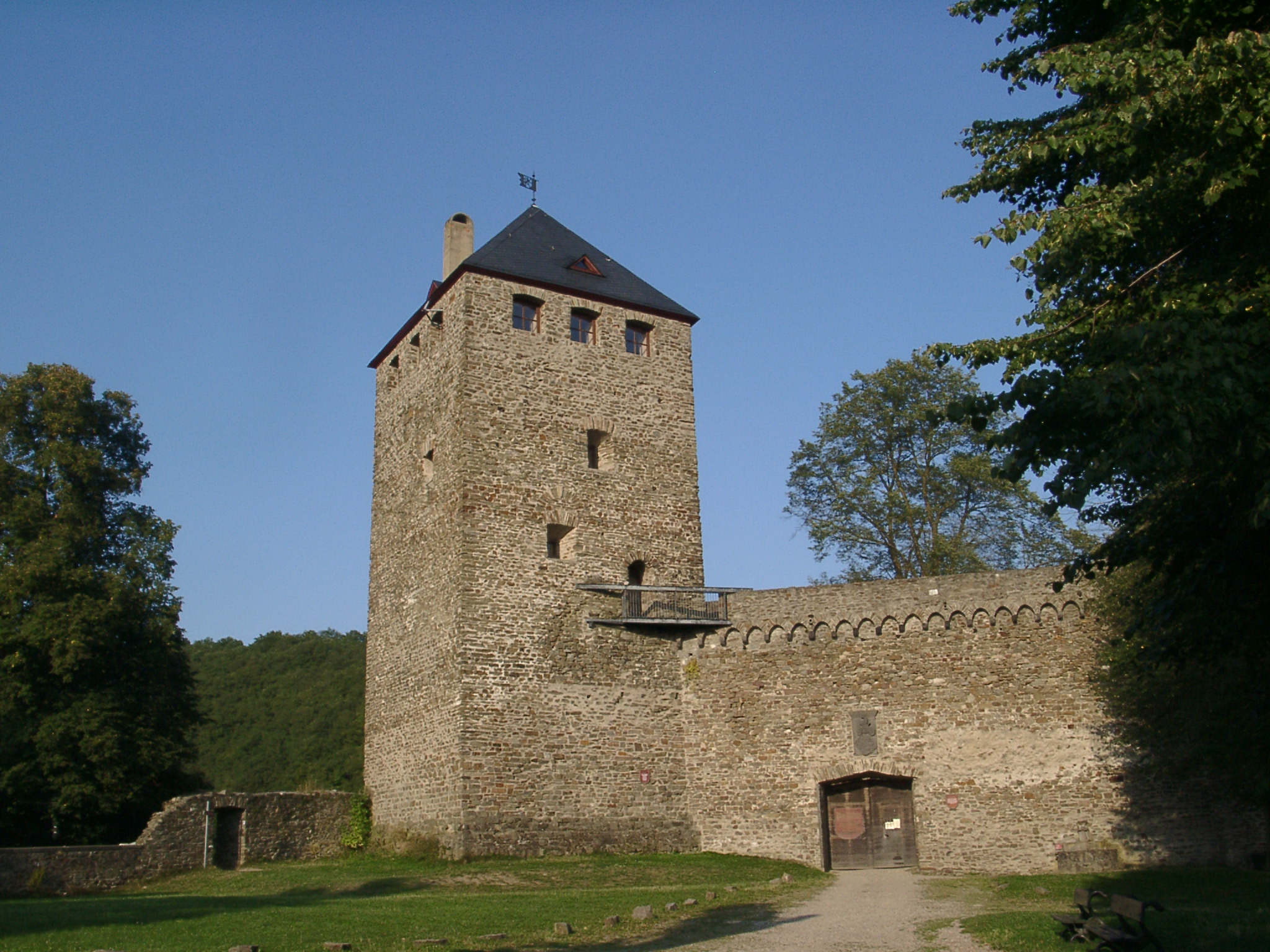
Sayn Castle: the elevated entrance of the bergfried is linked to the chemin de ronde by a footbridge

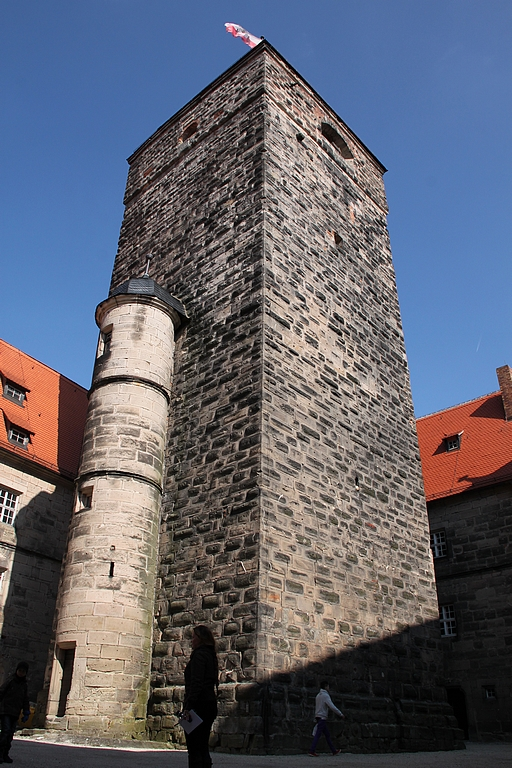
The 13th century bergfried of Rosenberg Fortress had a narrow staircase tower added in 1571 on the south side. Until then the tower only had an elevated entrance about 12 metres above the ground

== Literature ==
- Heinrich Boxler, Jörg Müller: Burgenland Schweiz. Bau und Alltag. Aare Verlag. Solothurn 1990, ISBN 3-7260-0352-5.
- Karl Heinz Dähn: Burgenkundliche Wanderungen im Raum Heilbronn. Heilbronn 2001, ISBN 3-9801562-5-7.
- Karl Heinz Dähn: Hocheingänge an mittelalterlichen Wehranlagen - mit Beispielen aus dem Raum Heilbronn. In: Jahrbuch für Schwäbisch-Fränkische Geschichte, Bd. 31, Historischer Verein, Heilbronn 1986, S. 5–24
- Hans Kleiner: Hocheingänge an mittelalterlichen Wehrbauten in der Rhön. In: Heimat-Jahrbuch des Landkreises Rhön-Grabfeld. Bd. 11, Mellrichstadt, Bad Neustadt 1989, S. 217–225.
- Otto Piper: Burgenkunde - Bauwesen und Geschichte der Burgen. 3 Auflage. München 1912. (Nachdruck: Augsburg 1994, ISBN 3-89350-554-7)
- Joachim Zeune: Burgen - Symbole der Macht. Ein neues Bild der mittelalterlichen Burg. Regensburg 1997, ISBN 3-7917-1501-1.
