= Burg Dagestein =

Castle in Germany

- Vilseck
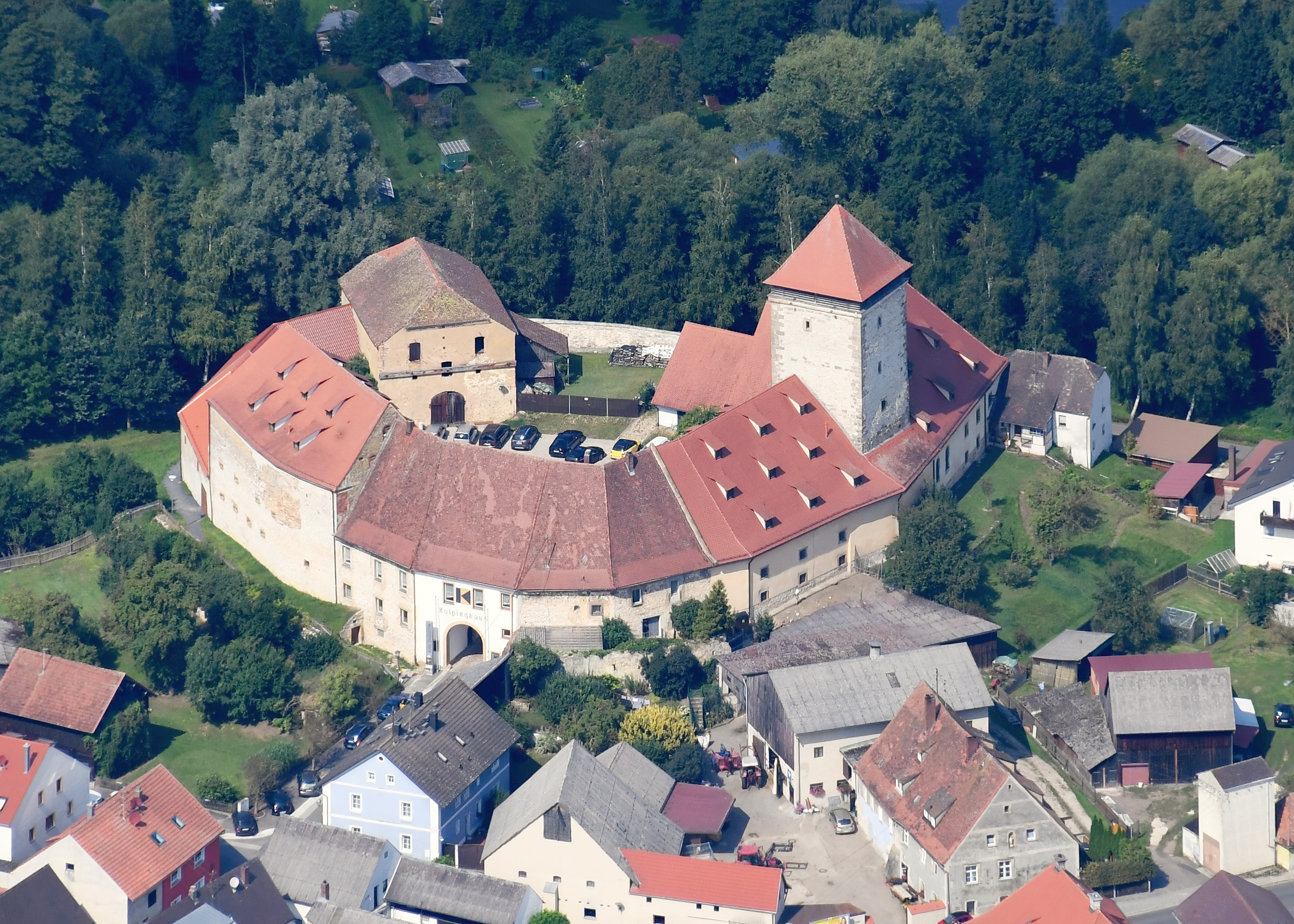

Site information
- Type: castle
- Code: DE-BY
- Condition: preserved or largely preserved

Location
- Coordinates: 49°36′49″N 11°48′32″E
- Height: 450 m above sea level (NN)

Site history
- Built: Presumed 11th/12th century

Burg Dagestein is a castle in the city of Vilseck in the Oberpfalz region of northeastern Bavaria, Germany.

== History ==
The starting date of construction on the castle is unclear, though the first documented evidence originates from the late 12th century. Archeological digs in the interior of the castle complex have so far produced no concrete evidence of a founding in the Early Middle Ages.

In 1185 Vilseck was first mentioned as a part of the Prince-Bishopric of Bamberg. One document from 1205 mentioned a Megelaus of Dagestein, and after the Dagestein dynasty died out, the lords of the Dagestein castle began to use the name of the burgeoning city of Vilseck. In the 15th century the complex was converted into a water castle. During the feud between Götz von Berlichingen (Götz of the Iron Hand) and the Roman Catholic Archdiocese of Bamberg, the castle was sacked and plundered, after which it was again rebuilt. In 1552 the castle was conquered by Albrecht Alcibiades, Margrave of Brandenburg-Kulmbach and thereafter used primarily as a granary and prison. Around 1730 large scale reconstruction occurred, and on the heels of secularization, parts of the castle were sold off to citizens of Vilseck. In the years 1796-7 the bandit leader Franz Troglauer was held prisoner in the castle for several months. Today the castle is owned by the city, with extensive renovations of the keep occurring between 1999 and 2002.

== Architecture ==
The castle complex consists of an inner courtyard surrounded by various Middle Ages constructions including an enceinte, a tower, a tithe barn, a zwinger, and a five-story Romanesque keep. The oldest visible ruins consist of parts of the enceinte that date back to the 11th or 12th century. The lower floors of the keep were constructed around 1200 out of sandstone ashlar blocks, with an elevated entrance many meters in height. Prior to later reconstructions, the castle chapel of Saint George was on the second floor of the keep.

The castle was protected in the east and southwest by the Zwinger and in the east and west by a moat which is now filled in.

== Literature ==
- Stefan Helml: Burgen und Schlösser im Kreis Amberg. Druckhaus Oberpfalz, Sulzbach-Rosenberg 1991, S. 228–232.
- Ursula Pfistermeister: Burgen der Oberpfalz. Verlag Friedrich Pustet, Regensburg 1974, ISBN 3-7917-0394-3, S. 97.
- Günter Moser, Bernhard Setzwein, Mathias Conrad: Oberpfälzer Burgen – Eine Reise zu den Zeugen der Vergangenheit. Buch und Kustverlg Oberpfalz, Amberg 2004, ISBN 3-935719-25-6, S. 114–115.
- Karl Wächter, Günter Moser: Auf den Spuren von Rittern und Edelleuten im Landkreis Amberg-Sulzbach. Buch- und Kunstverlag Oberpfalz, Amberg 1992, ISBN 3-924350-26-4, S. 70–72.
