= Splügen Castle =

Swiss castle ruins

- Burg Splügen
- Splügen
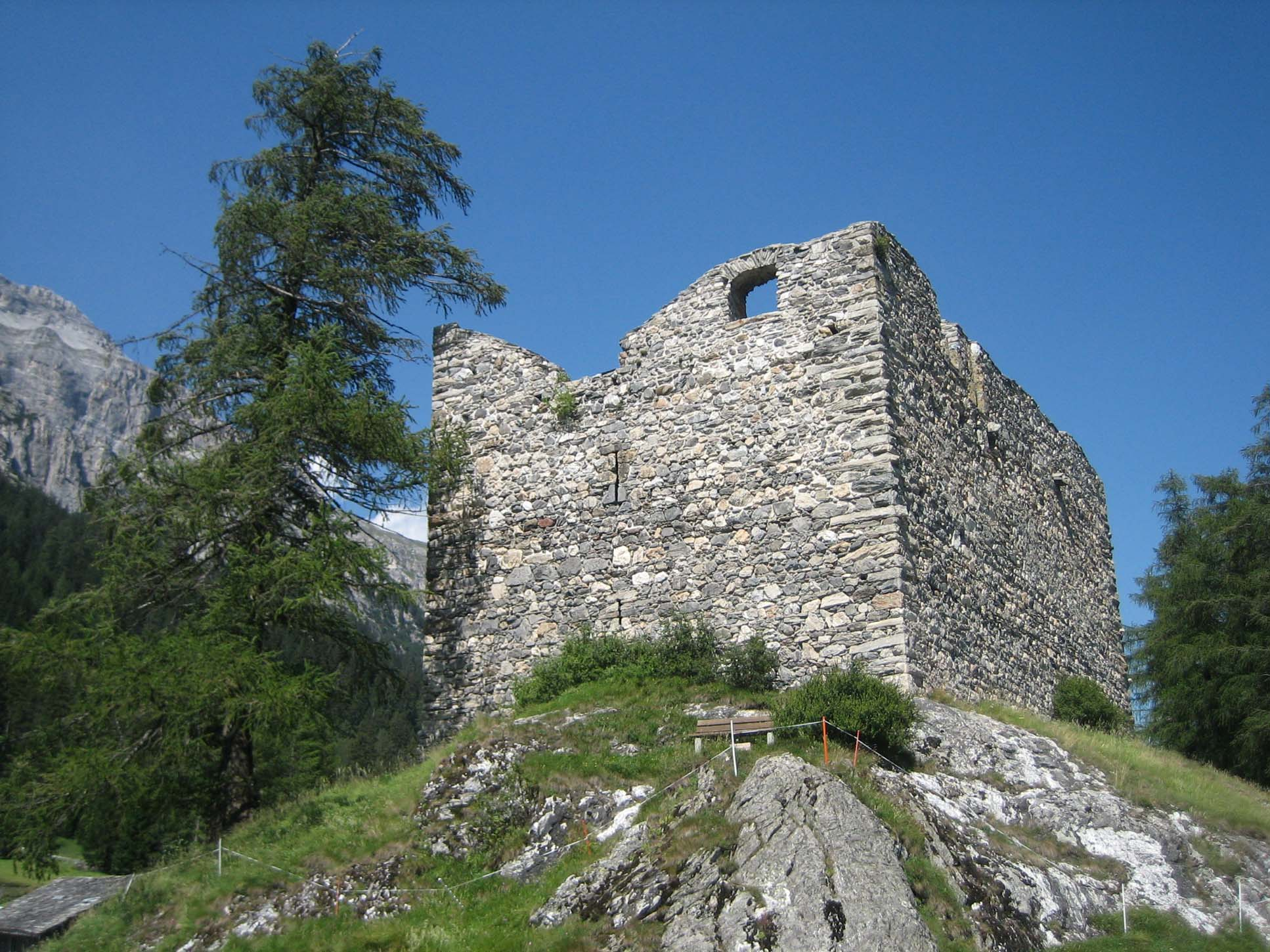
- Splügen Castle

Site information
- Type: motte-and-bailey castle
- Code: CH-GR
- Condition: ruin

Location
- Coordinates: 46°33′24″N 9°20′04″E
- Area: 18 × 20 m (59 × 66 ft)

Site history
- Built: around 1275
- Materials: rubblestone, gravel

Garrison information
- Occupants: free nobility

Airfield information
- Elevation: 1,518 m (4,980 ft) AMSL

The ruins of the former Splügen Castle (German: Burg Splügen) lie east of the village of Splügen in the Rheinwald forest in the Swiss canton of Graubünden. It is the only castle in the valley.

== Location ==
The ruins lie just under one kilometre east of the village on a small hill below the former valley road that ran from the Via Mala over the Splügen and San Bernardino Passes. It is an easy ten-minute walk from the village along a lane. It is not possible to drive to the castle.

== Description ==
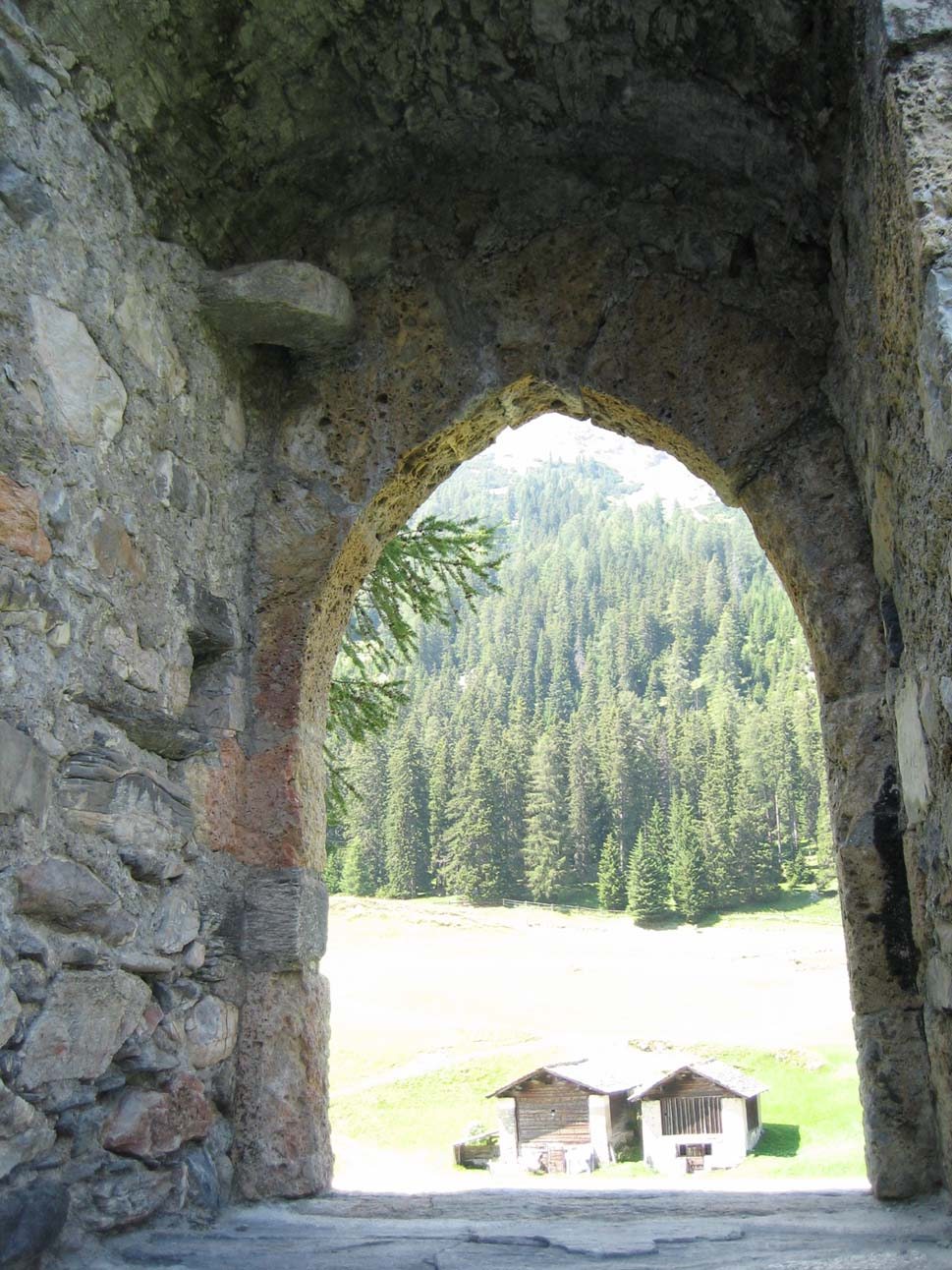
Inside of the elevated entrance with its hewn-out trunnion ring

The ruins of a fortified, double-winged palas and an enceinte (Bering) are visible on the northern side by the old road. Three of the walls, which are well over a metre thick, have survived; the east wall facing the valley has collapsed. The quoins have a clear border (Kantenschlag). One additional wall divides the site into an eastern and western half.

The elevated entrance with its Gothic archway, with jambs made of tuff, lies at about four metres above the ground on the northern side and leads to the first floor. Putlog holes on the exterior show where the staircase access was. The doors turned in a carefully hewn out stone ring and could be locked with a bar.

In the lower two storeys were cellars and storerooms that were only lit by narrow window slits. In the western area of the third floor were the living quarters, as can be seen from the remains of weathered windows with their niches for seating and from the fireplace. An exit leads out to a small balcony or garderobe. Nothing is known about the shape of the roof. The kitchen was in the eastern, less well lit area.

The northern curtain wall is filled with rubble. It is possible that stables and outbuildings stood here. There was probably an external portal in the, now collapsed, eastern wall.

In the area of the old road there are traces of a barrier wall called a Letzi guarding the valley further upstream.

== History ==
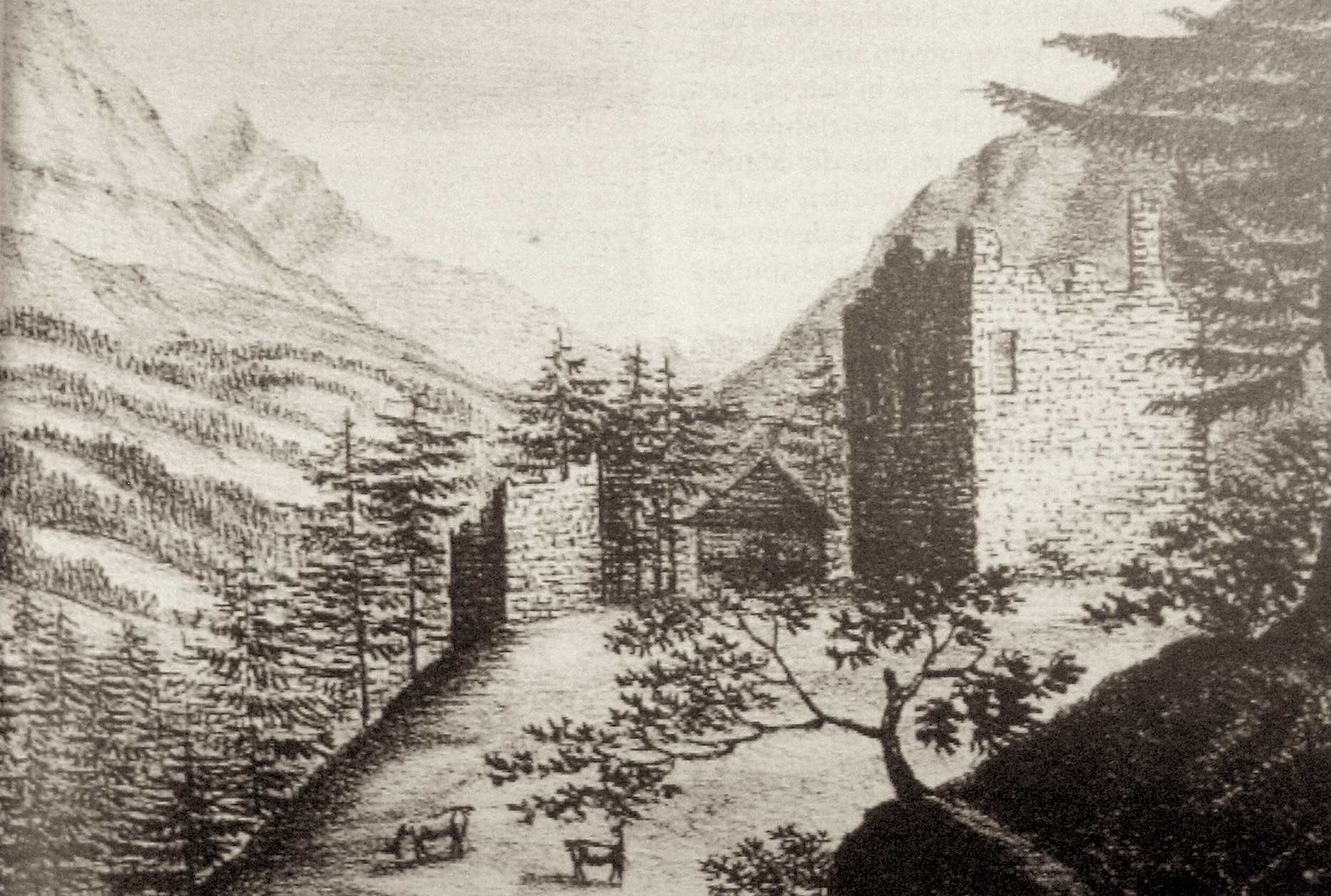
Illustration by Heinrich Kranek around 1830, looking up the valley

The architectural form of Splügen Castle, with its door and window shapes and doorjambs made of tuff, match well to the second half of the 13th century; and it may have been built around 1275. In that period the valley in the Rheinwald was part of the territory of the County of Schams which, as a fief of the Prince-Bishopric of Chur, was given to the barons of Vaz and, later, the counts of Werdenberg. The barons of Sax-Misox tried to manage their territory of Misox over the San Bernardino by settling Walsers there. In 1274 they wrote out a letter (Schirmbrief) in Mesocco to a group of Walsers.

The appearance of Walsers on the border of their territory must have alarmed the barons of Vaz, however they sought to extend their rule into the sparsely populated valleys. In 1277 the Walsers came under the protection of the Vaz family. This suggests that Splügen Castle, together with the Letzi, had been built around 1275 by the Freiherren of Vaz in order to put a stop to the advances of the Misox clan. The Walsers clearly felt safer under the lordship of the House of Vaz than under the ords of Sax-Misox on the far side of the pass.

Having headed off the incursions of the House of Misox and the expansion of the Walser colony, the castle of Splügen lost its strategic significance. The source material also indicates a short period of use. As early as 1308 a purchase deed simply describes it as a castle site (a Burgstall) and a farmstead: "an das Burggstal mit siner gewohnliche hoffraiti".

So by the early 14th century the castle was clearly already in ruins. In 1462 Jörg of Werdenberg paid the Amman of Rheinwald a rent for the estate by the castle ("ab dem guot by der Burg"), which referred to the old castle of Splügen. Whether the castle was still standing at the time is not known.

When the Rheinwald was sold by Jörg of Werdenberg in 1493 to the Milanese army commander, Gian Giacomo Trivulzio, Lord of Sax-Misox, the castle of Splügen was no longer mentioned.

== See also ==
- List of castles in Switzerland

== Literature ==
- Fritz Hauswirth: Burgen und Schlösser in der Schweiz. Vol. 8. Neptun, Kreuzlingen, 1972.
- Otto P. Clavedetscher, Werner Meyer: Das Burgenbuch von Graubünden. Zürich/Schwäbisch Hall, 1984.
- Werner Meyer: Burgen der Schweiz. Band 3. Silva, Zürich, 1983.
