= Jörgenberg Castle =

Castle in Switzerland

- Munt sogn Gieri
- Waltensburg/Vuorz
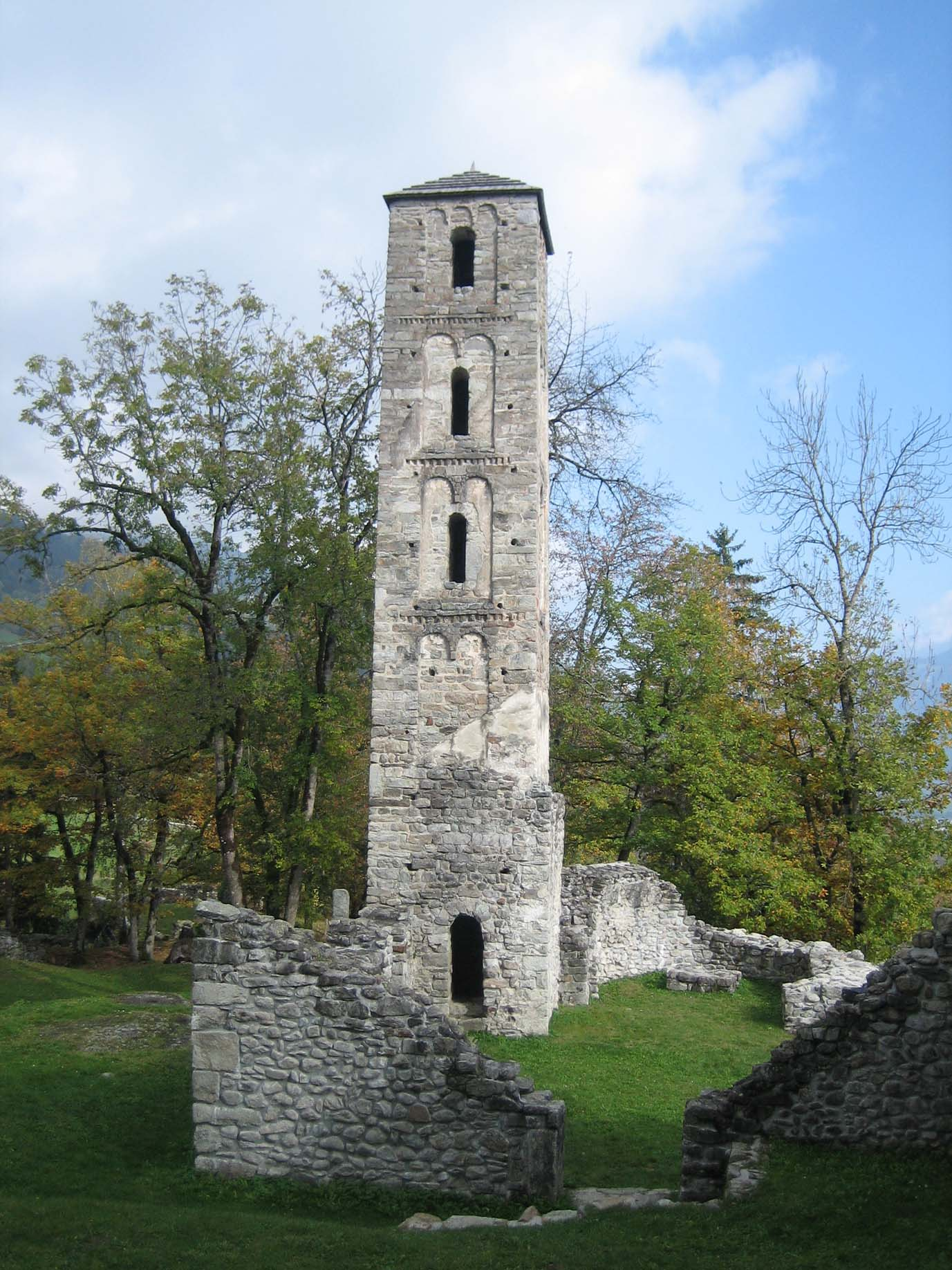
- Ruins of Jörgenberg Castle

Site information
- Type: hill castle, spur castle
- Code: CH-GR
- Condition: ruin

Location
- Coordinates: 46°46′49″N 09°08′17″E
- Height: 939 m above the sea

Site history
- Built: 765

Swiss Cultural Property of National Significance

Jörgenberg Castle is a castle in the municipality of Waltensburg/Vuorz of the Canton of Graubünden in Switzerland. It is a Swiss heritage site of national significance.

== History ==
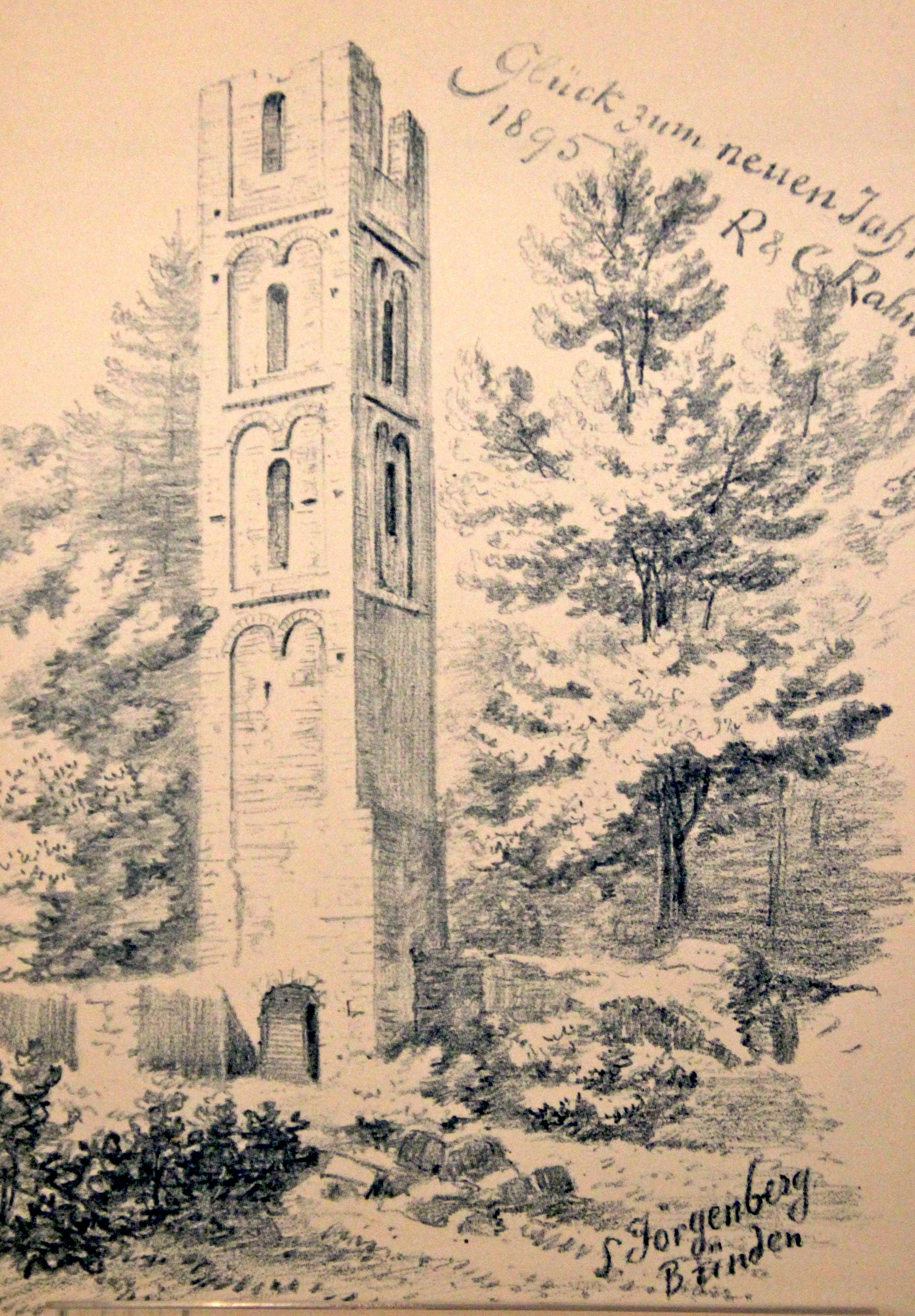
Bell tower at Jörgenberg in 1895

Jörgenberg Castle was built in the 8th century as a fortified church, on lands donated by the Frankish kings. In the 765 testament of Bishop Tello it was referred to as a castellum on Jörgenberg hill. At the beginning of the 9th century it was called ecclesia sancti Georgii in Castello or St. George's Church in a Castle. The current castle and church were probably built on the site of an earlier walled church. The timbers in the bell tower have been dated to 1070. Over the following centuries the church became a medieval feudal castle and in 1265 the main tower was completed.

In the 14th century the castle appears in the historical record in the possession of the Freiherren von Fry(i)berg, who were vassals of the powerful Vaz family. In 1333 a coalition of religious and secular lords fought against the Vaz and their vassals, including the Frybergs. Both Jörgenberg and the nearby village and castle of Siat were captured by the coalition. The peace treaty on 1333 returned the castles, but the Freiherr von Rhäzüns had some type of a claim on it. However, a few years later the last member of the Vaz family, Donat, died leaving the Frybergs without a powerful patron. To avoid losing their estates, they sold Siat and Jörgenberg to the Dukes of Austria and then received them back as a fief. In 1342 the last male heir of the Fryberg family, Reinher, died and the Austrians gave the castle to the Counts of Werdenberg. The Freiherr von Rhäzüns demanded the castles based on his claim from 1333 and began attacking the Austrians in the region. During the fighting the main tower was burned. The peace treaty of 1343 placed the fate of the castle in the hands of an arbitrator, who granted the castle to Rhäzüns.

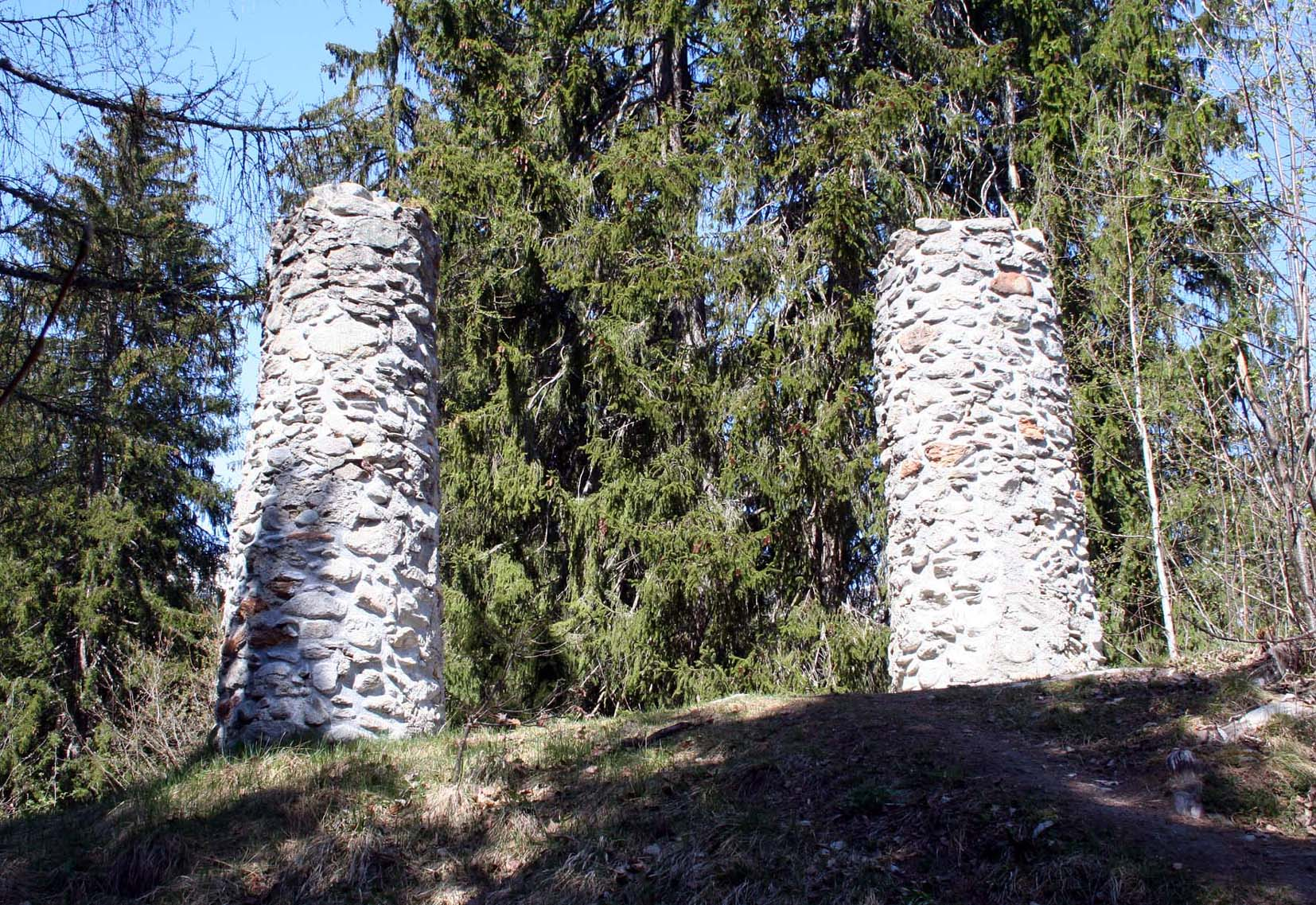
Stone gallows near the castle

Beginning around 1351 the Rhäzüns family rebuilt the burned tower and added a palas to the north-west corner. In 1378 they bought the nearby Herrschaft of Grünenfels and combined the two into the Herrschaft of Jörgenberg. They appointed vogts to administer the herrschaft for the following century. In 1458 Jörgenberg passed to the Counts von Zollern. The local farmers and villagers disliked the foreign Swabian Zollerns and refused to pay them homage and often rose up in rebellion. A little over a decade later, in 1472, the Zollerns got rid of the troublesome province by selling it to the Abbot of Disentis Abbey. Under the abbot the castle remained the administrative and judicial center of the herrschaft. A pair of stone gallows pillars were built near the castle for executions. In 1539 the Protestant Reformation swept through the area, eliminating much of the Abbey's secular and judicial power and forcing the Abbey to sell Jörgenberg to Mathias de Rungs von Waltersburg. At that time the castle and church were still in good condition. In 1580 Mathias de Rungs sold the castle to L. Gandreya, whose family held it for more than a century.

During the 17th century it was abandoned and began to fall into ruin. In 1705 the Gandreyas sold the ruins to the municipality. In 1734 the Abbot of Disentis surrendered all his rights to Waltensburg, but retained the title of Lord of Jörgenberg.

In 1931-32 the castle ruins were excavated, cleaned and reinforced. It was repaired again in 1998–2001.

== Castle site ==
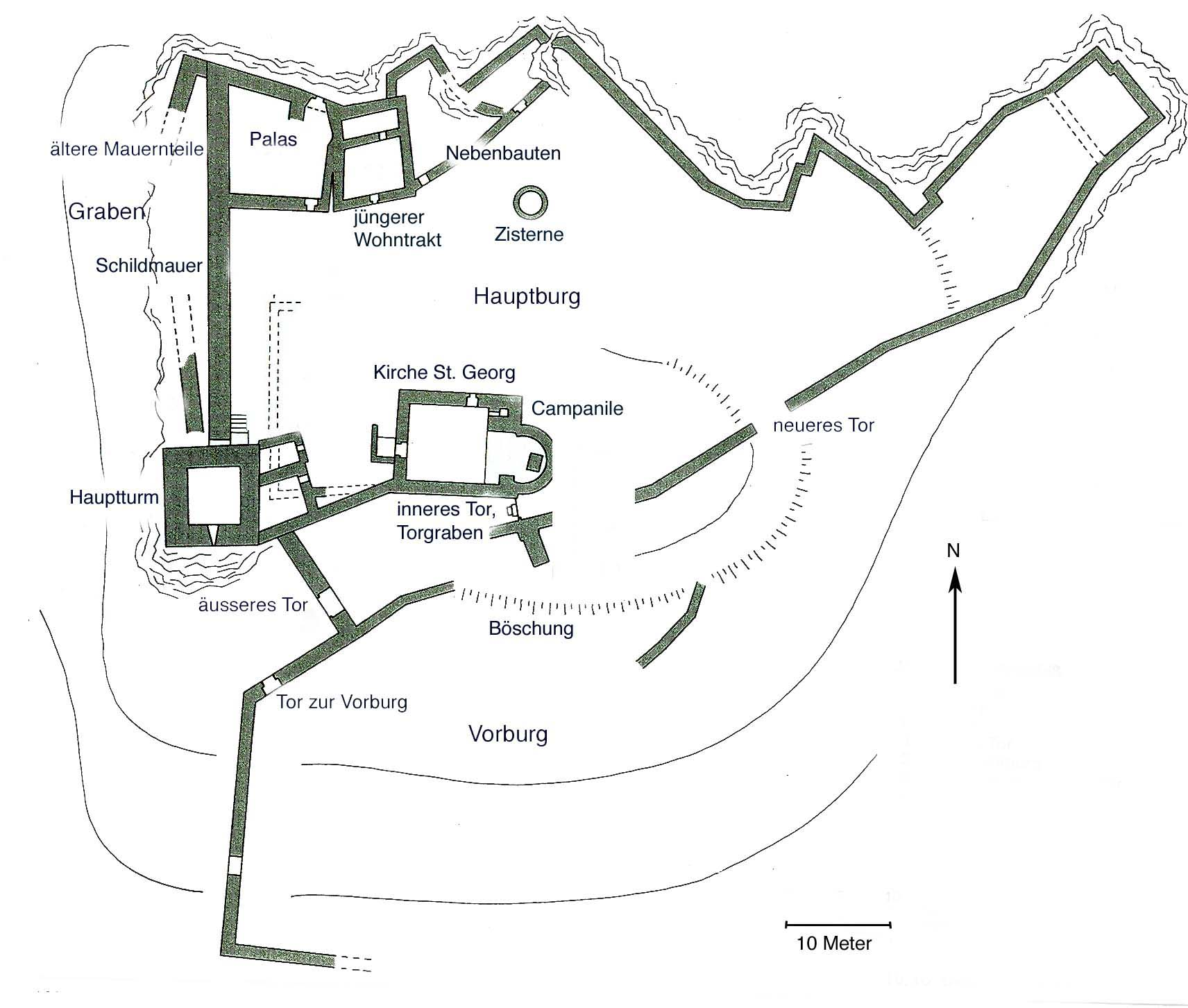
Plan of Jörgenberg Castle

The castle sprawls across a 100 by 70 meters (330 ft × 230 ft) plateau atop St. George's hill east of Waltensburg/Vuorz. Most of the church is in ruins, but the Romanesque bell tower is still standing. The slender tower is decorated with blind arches and was built around 1070. The mostly ruined walls of the church were built in the 12th or 13th century, though the northern wall was rebuilt in 1930. The church has a broad nave with a horse-shoe shaped apse and a choir of tuff blocks.

The castle was built in the 12th and 13th century. The five-story main tower was finished around 1265. It is a Romanesque building with round arch windows in the upper two stories. The palas was built around 1351 and was expanded with additional housing later. The ring wall along the northern side of the plateau was also added later.

The two stone pillars of the old gallows are located west of the castle.

== Gallery ==
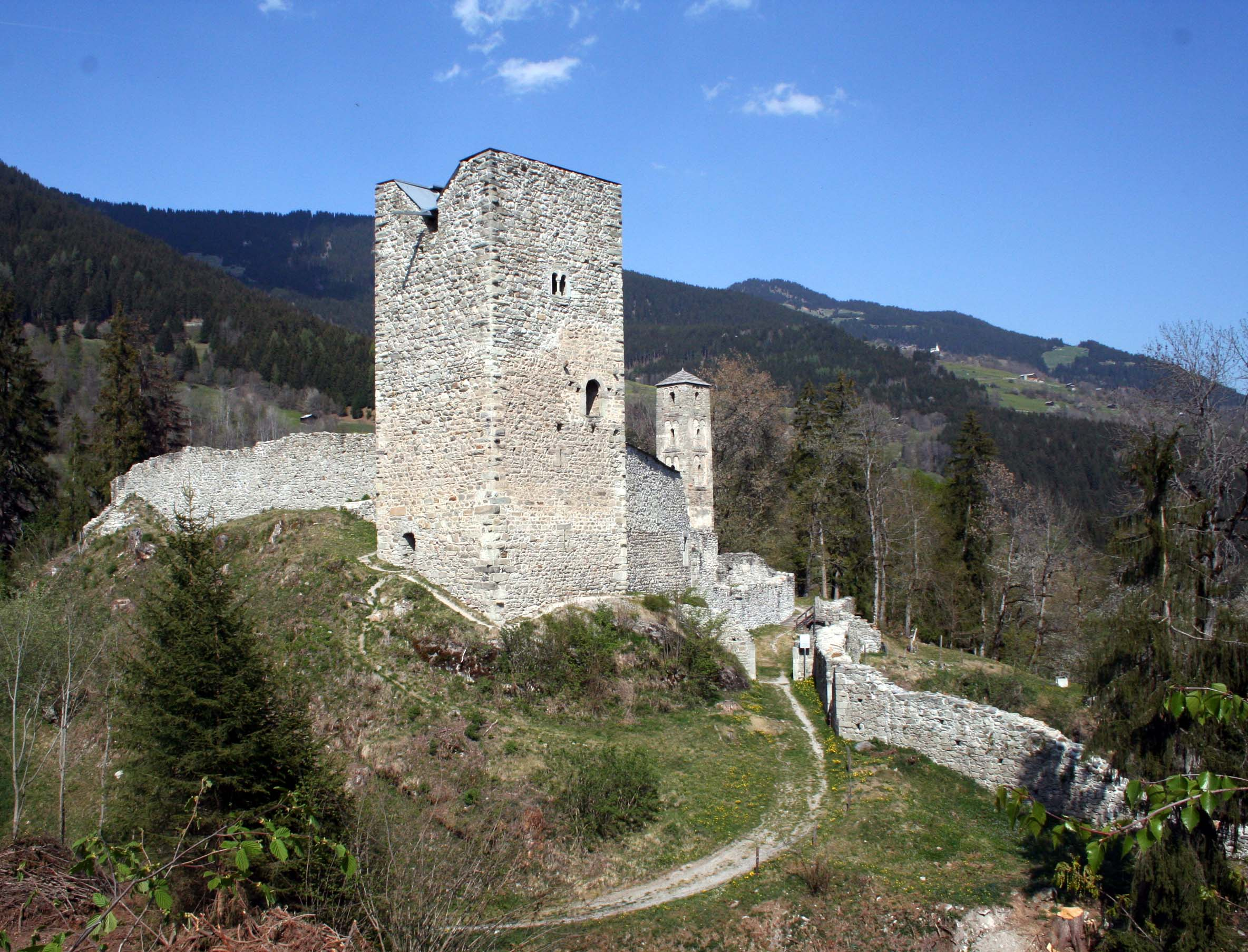
Main tower of the castle

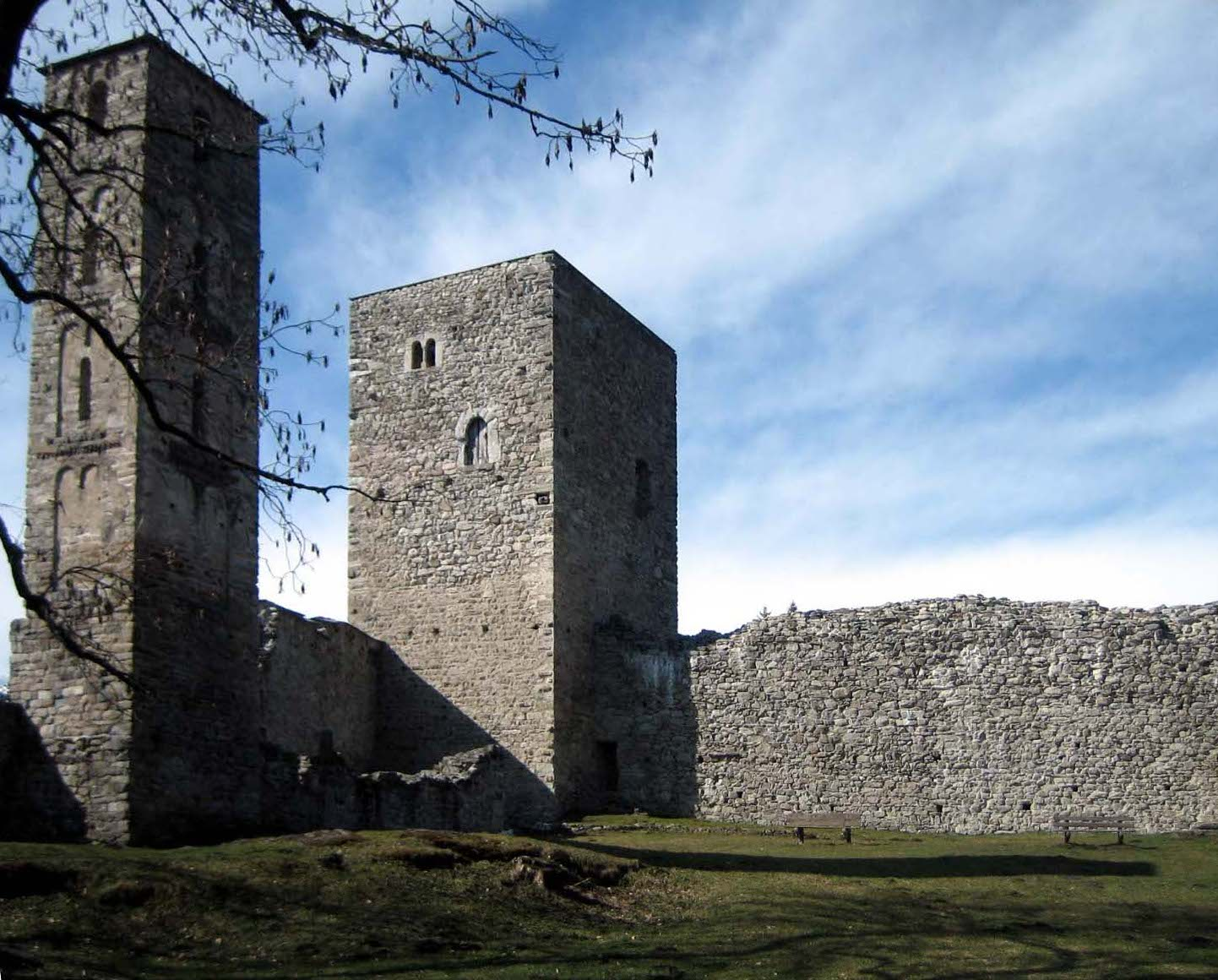
Main tower and bell tower from the courtyard

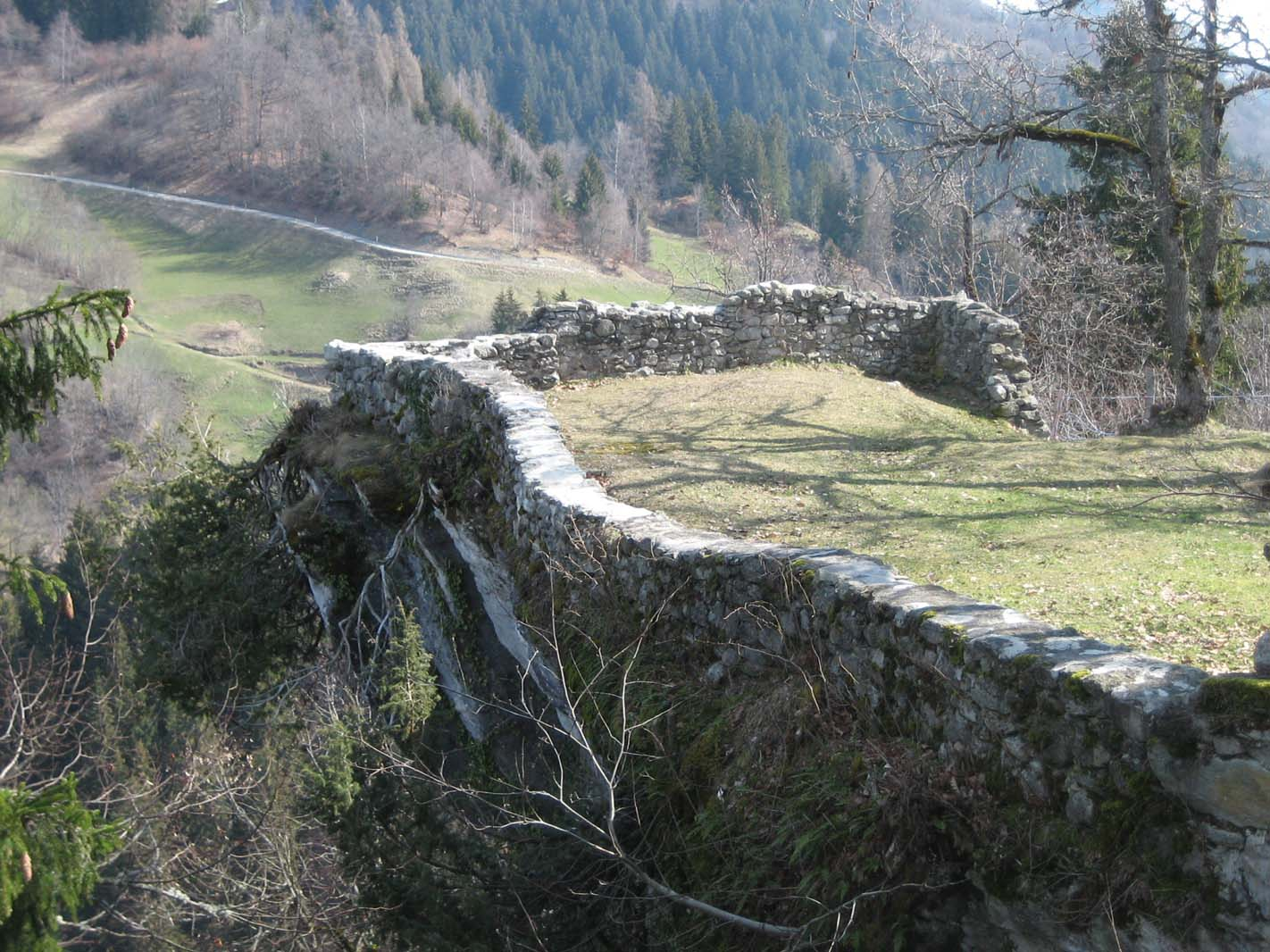
Wall around the complex

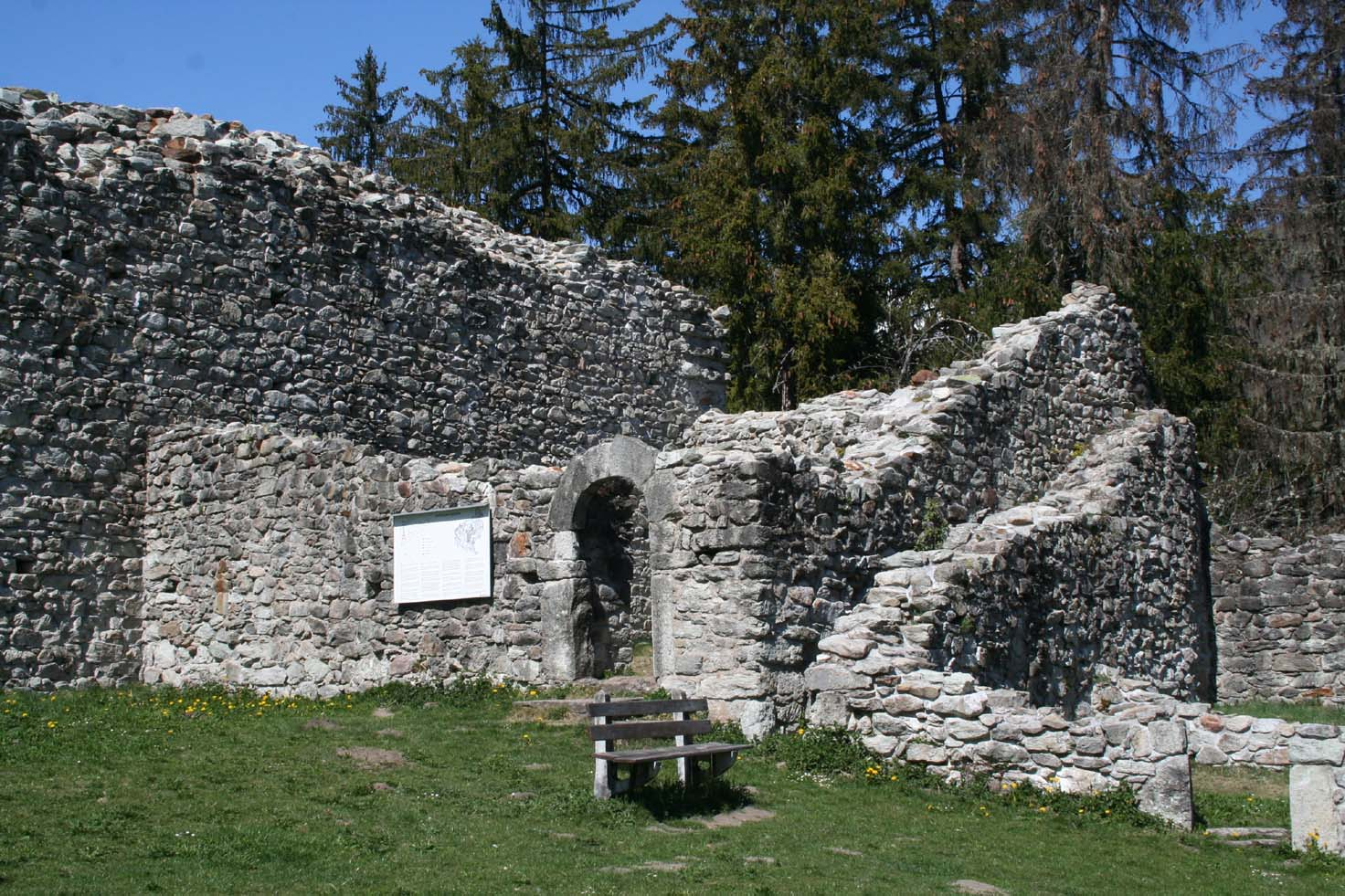
Ruins of the palas building

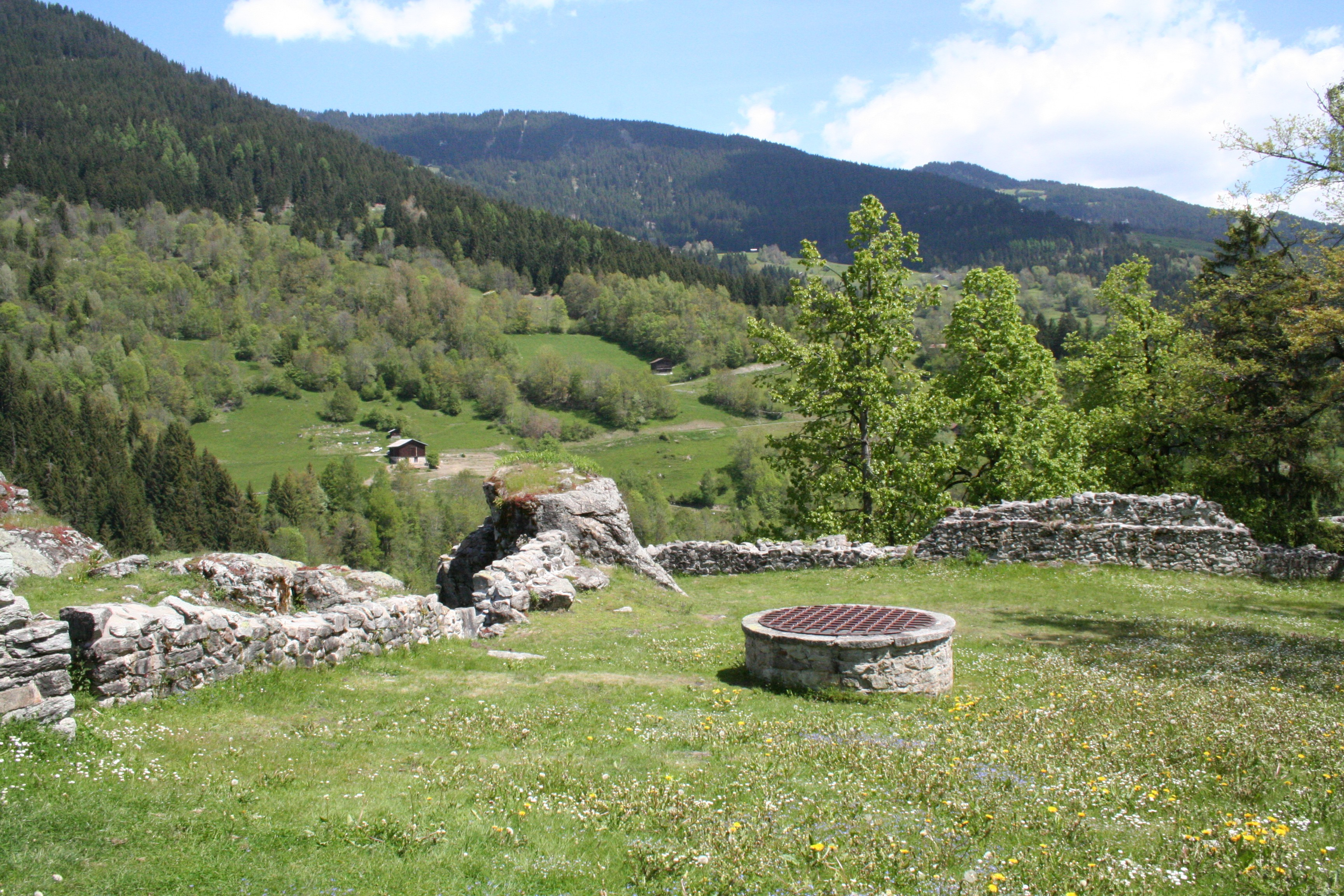
Castle cistern

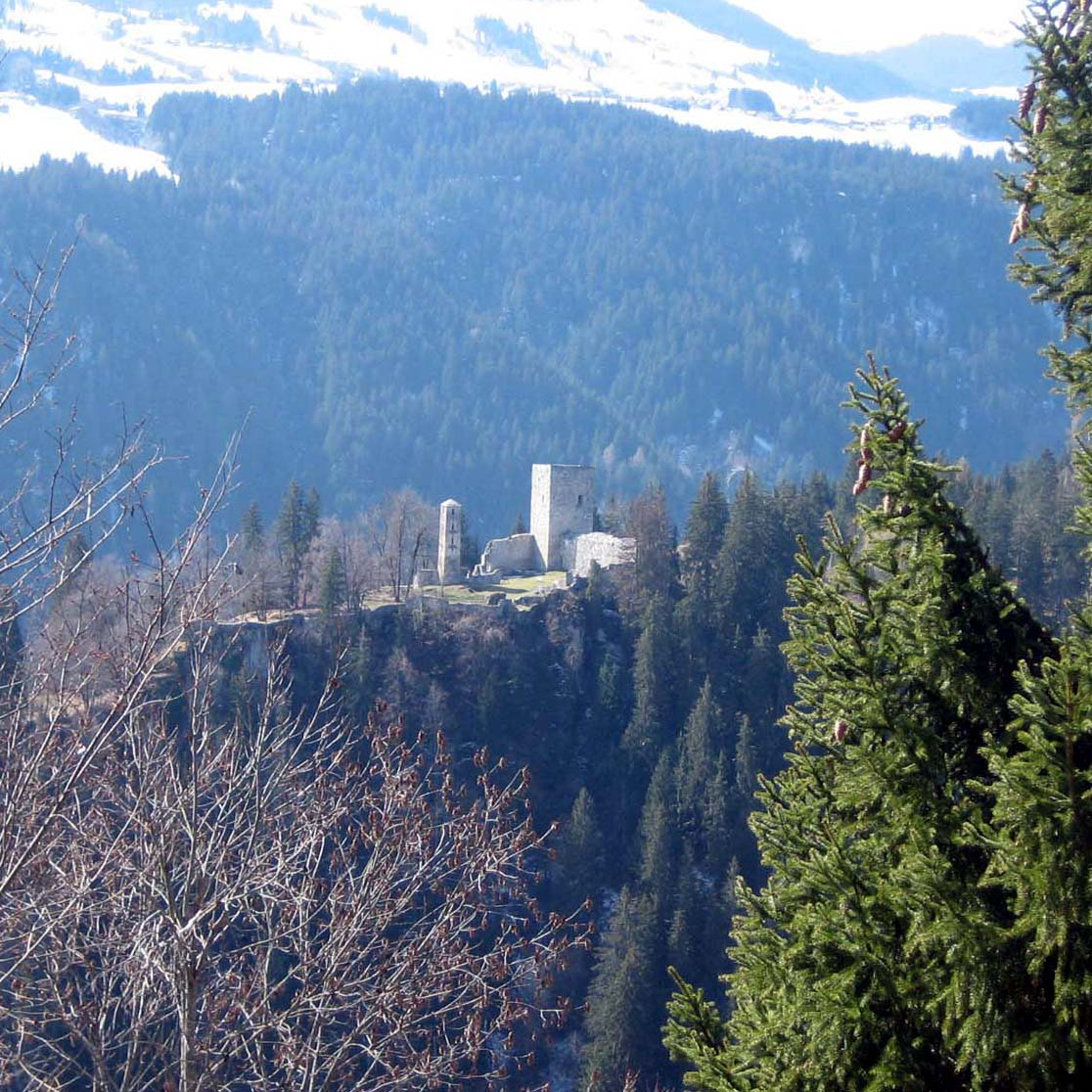
The castle and surrounding mountains

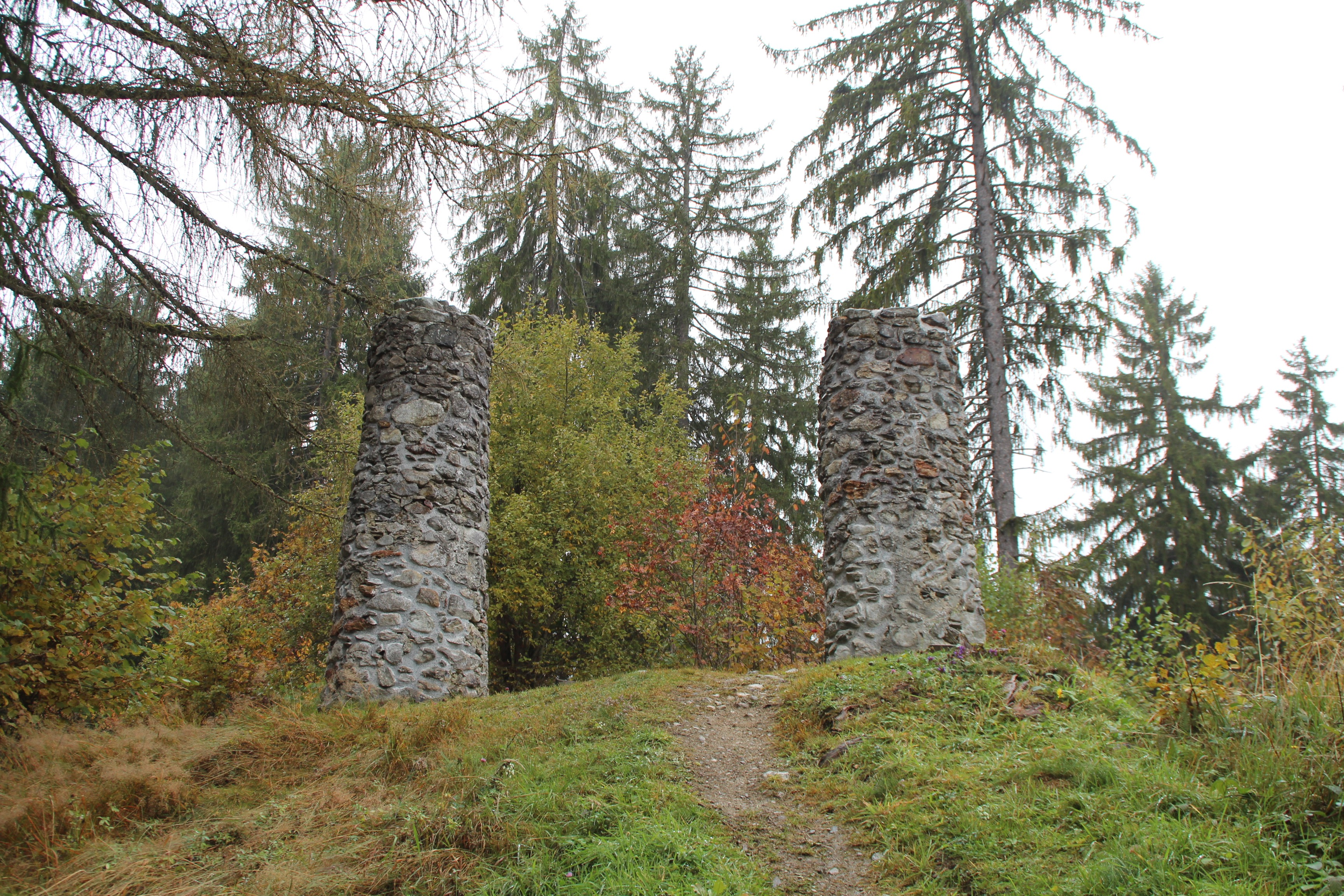
Stone gallows near the castle

== See also ==
- List of castles in Switzerland
