= Küssaburg =

Ruined hilltop castle in the German state of Baden-Württemberg

- Burg Küssaberg
- Küssaberg-Bechtersbohl
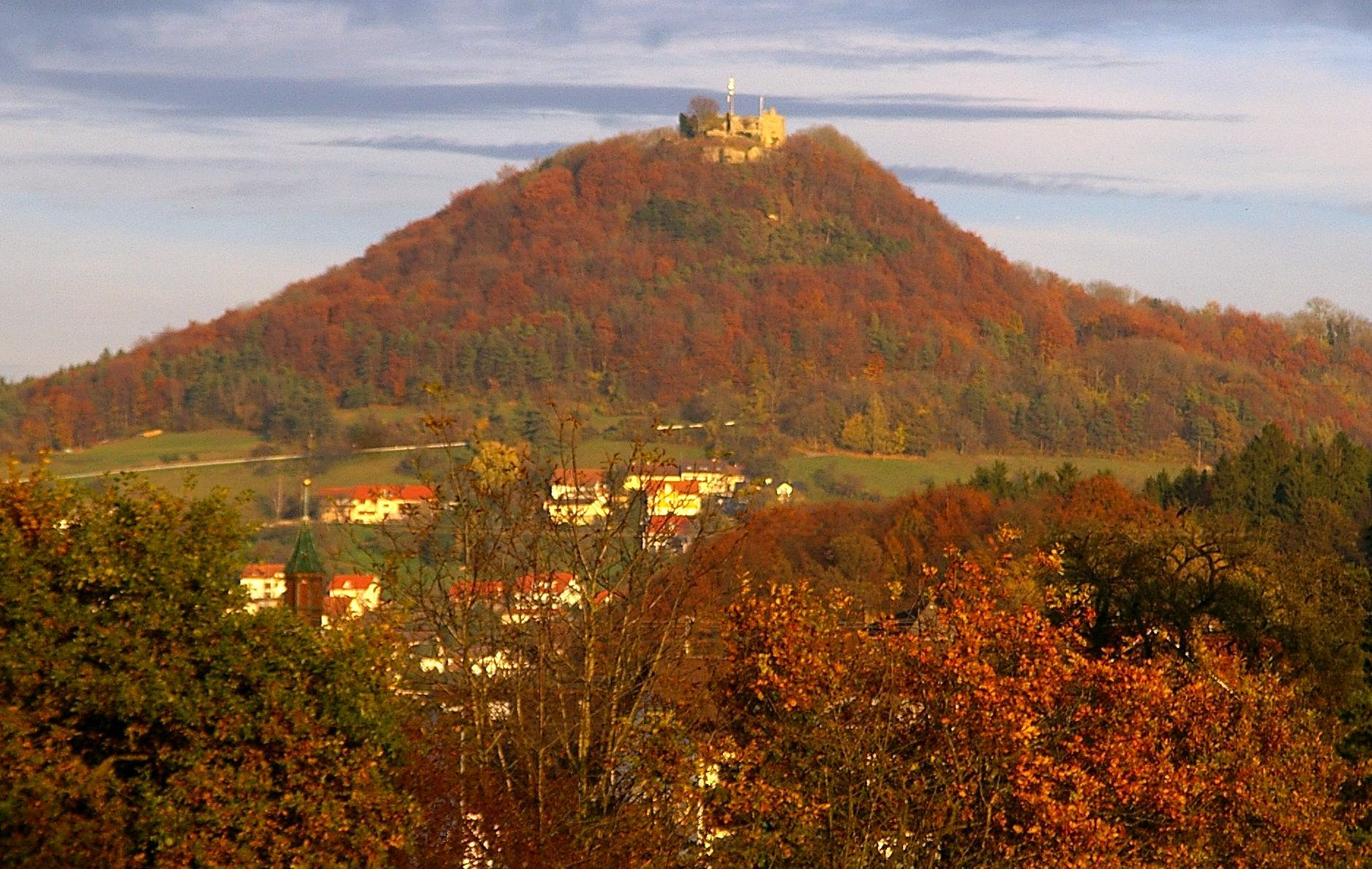
- Bechtersbohl and the Küssaburg

Site information
- Type: hill castle, summit location
- Code: DE-BW
- Condition: ruin

Location
- Coordinates: 47°36′07″N 8°21′13″E
- Height: 634 m above sea level (NN)

Site history
- Built: 1125 to 1141

Garrison information
- Occupants: counts

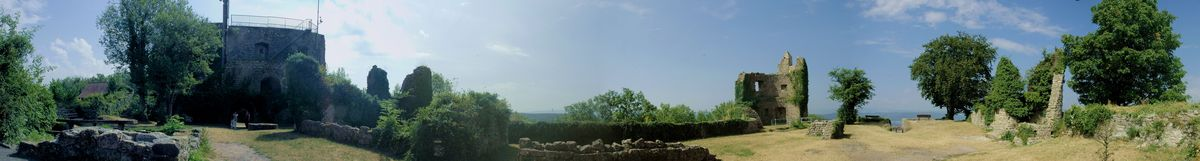
Panorama of the interior of the castle site

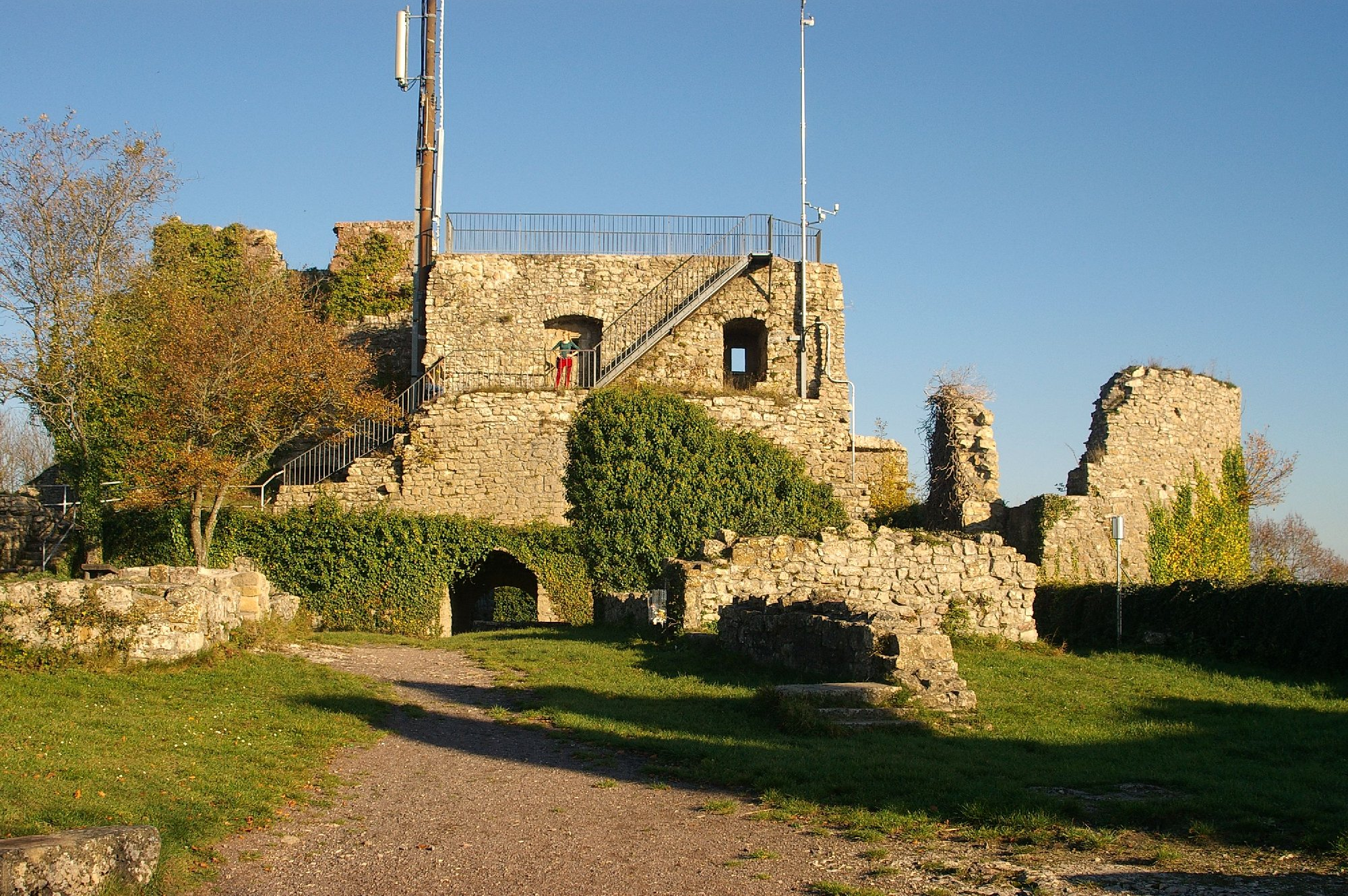
The ruins of the Küssaburg

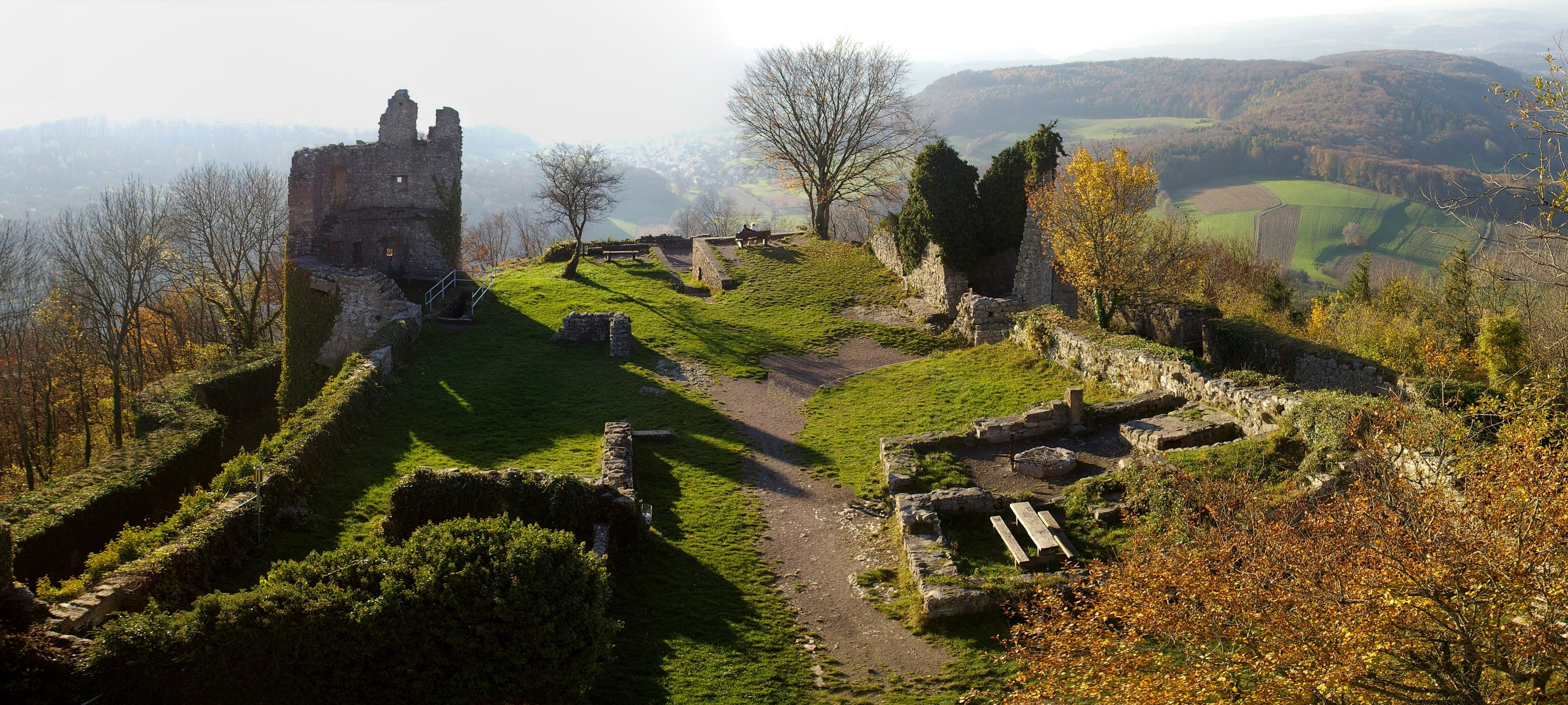
View from the Küssaburg looking west

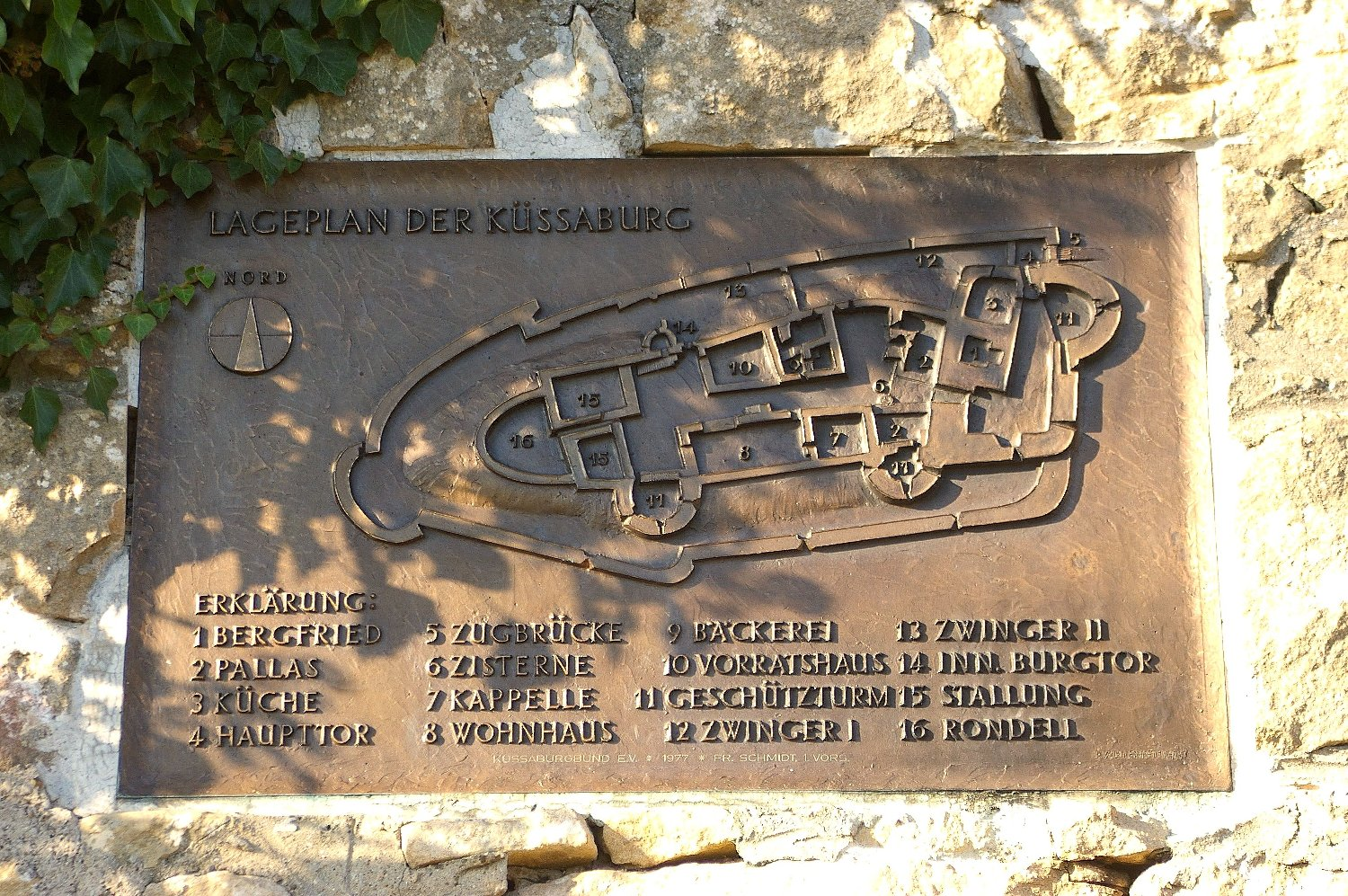
Plan of the castle

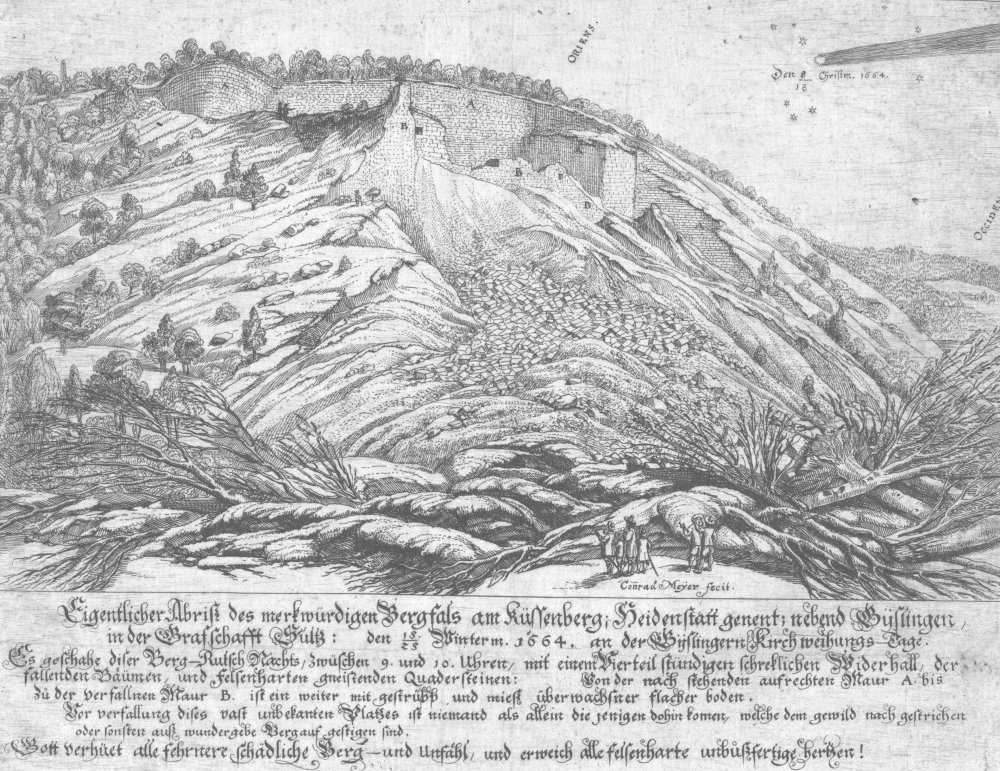
Copperplate by Conrad Meyer, 1665, landslide of 25 December 1664

The Küssaburg, also known as Küssenberg or Küssaberg Castle (German: Burg Küssaberg) is a ruined hilltop castle located at an elevation of 634 m above sea level (NN) in Bechtersbohl, a village in the municipality of Küssaberg, in the county of Waldshut in the German state of Baden-Württemberg.

The name may be derived from the Roman personal name, Cossinius, or from the German Kissen (Alemannic Chüssi) which means "cushion", after the shape of the mountain on which it stands.

The hill castle is one of the most important historic buildings on the High Rhine and a landmark of the county of Waldshut. It was probably constructed between 1125 and 1141. The present ruins were owned inter alia by the counts of Küssenberg, the Bishopric of Constance and the counts of Sulz. The castle, which was later developed into a fortress, was destroyed by a fire started by its garrison on 8 March 1634 when the Swedish Army approached it during the Thirty Years' War and by a landslide on 25 December 1664. In the 19th century work began on uncovering the ruins which have since become a popular destination in the region.

== Location ==
The ruins lie above the village at an elevation of about 634 metres above sea level. They are a landmark in this region and overlook the Klettgau, which runs east of the mountain, and the Rhine valley (High Rhine). In addition, there are views of the Southern Black Forest and the Aargau in Switzerland.

== Literature ==
- Andreas Weiß, Christian Ruch: Die Küssaburg. Herausgegeben vom Küssaburg-Bund e.V., o. O. 2009.
- Robert Feger: Burgen und Schlösser in Südbaden. Eine Auswahl. Weidlich, Würzburg, 1984, ISBN 3-8035-1237-9.
- Norbert Nothhelfer (ed.): Der Kreis Waldshut. Konrad Theiss Verlag, Stuttgart/Aalen, 1975, ISBN 3-8062-0124-2.
- Küssaberg im Landkreis Waldshut. Gemeinde Küssaberg.
- Lauchringen, 1985.
- Arthur Hauptmann: Burgen einst und jetzt - Burgen und Burgruinen in Südbaden und angrenzenden Gebieten. Verlag Südkurier, Konstanz, 1984, ISBN 3-87799-040-1, pp. 259–263.
- Heinz Voellner: Die Burgen und Schlösser zwischen Wutachschlucht und Hochrhein, 1979.
- Bender, Knappe, Wilke: Burgen im südlichen Baden. 1979, ISBN 3-921340-41-1.
- Franz Xaver Kraus: Die Kunstdenkmäler des Großherzogthums Baden, Freiburg im Breisgau, 1892, Vol. III - Kreis Waldshut; pp. 133-142 online
- Christian Roder: Die Schloßkaplanei Küssenberg und die St. Annenkapelle zu Dangstetten. In: Freiburger Diözesan Archiv
- Emil Müller-Ettikon, Kurzer Überblick über die Geschichte Küssabergs, Gemeinde Küssaberg (publ.), 1986.
