= Putlog hole =

Small holes in walls to hold scaffolding

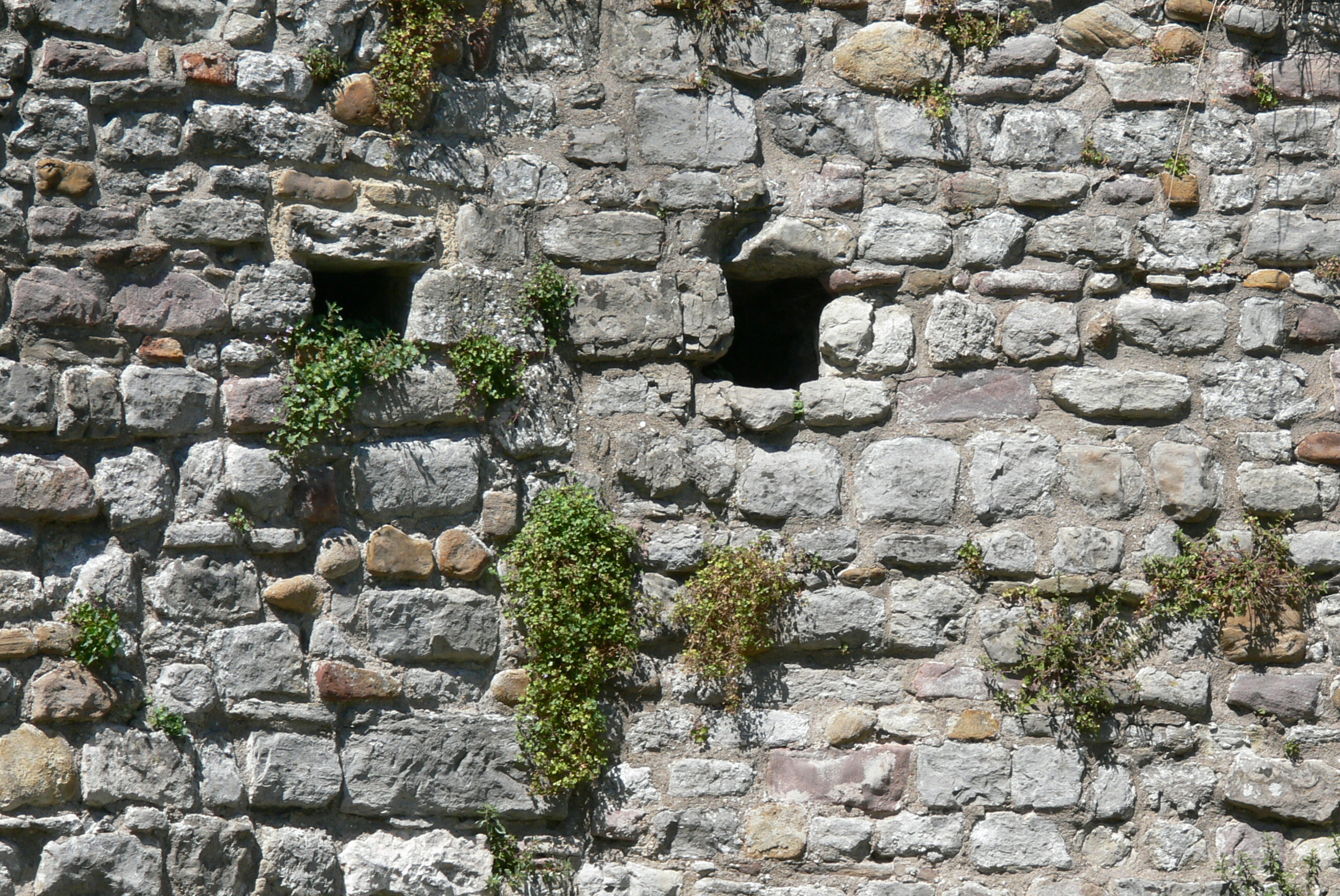
Putlog holes in Cardiff castle

Putlog holes or putlock holes are small holes made in the walls of structures to receive the ends of poles (small round logs) or beams, called putlogs or putlocks, to support a scaffolding. Putlog holes may extend through a wall to provide staging on both sides of the wall.

A historically common type of scaffolding, putlog holes date from ancient Roman buildings. The term putlock and the newer term putlog date from the 17th century and are still used today. Putlogs may be supported on the outer ends by vertical poles (standards), cantilevered by one end being firmly embedded in the wall, or cantilevered by penetrating the wall to provide scaffolds on both sides. Putlogs may be sawn off flush with the wall if they cannot be removed, but exterior putlog holes are typically filled in as the scaffold is removed to prevent water from entering the walls. Interior putlog holes may be left open, particularly if not in a finished space.

The inconsequential size and the spacing of the holes meant that they did not affect the solidity of the walls, and in well-preserved castles, like Beaumaris, the ancient putlog holes can be seen to this day.

== Gallery ==
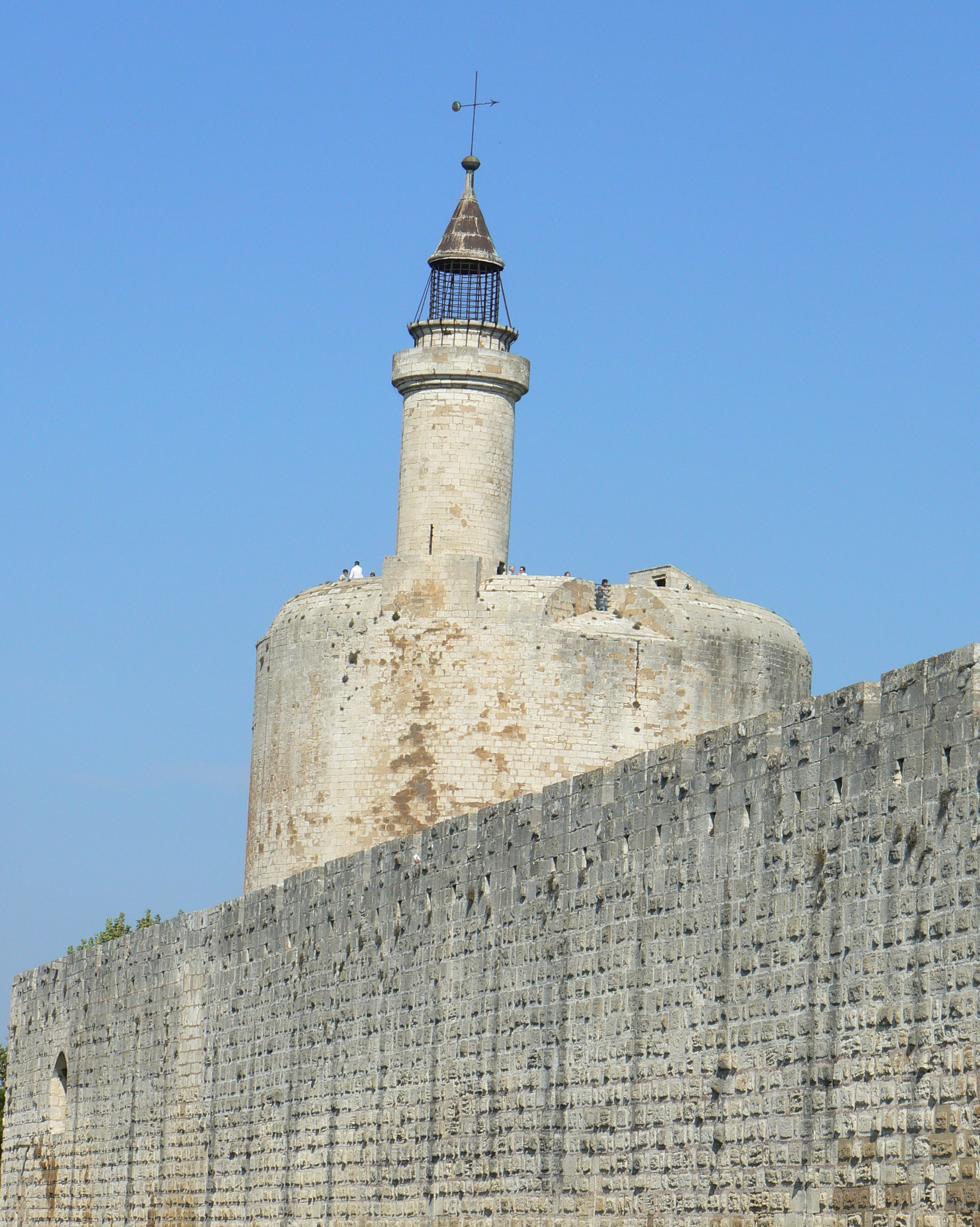
Putlog holes for hoardings are visible running along the top of the wall at Aigues-Mortes, France.

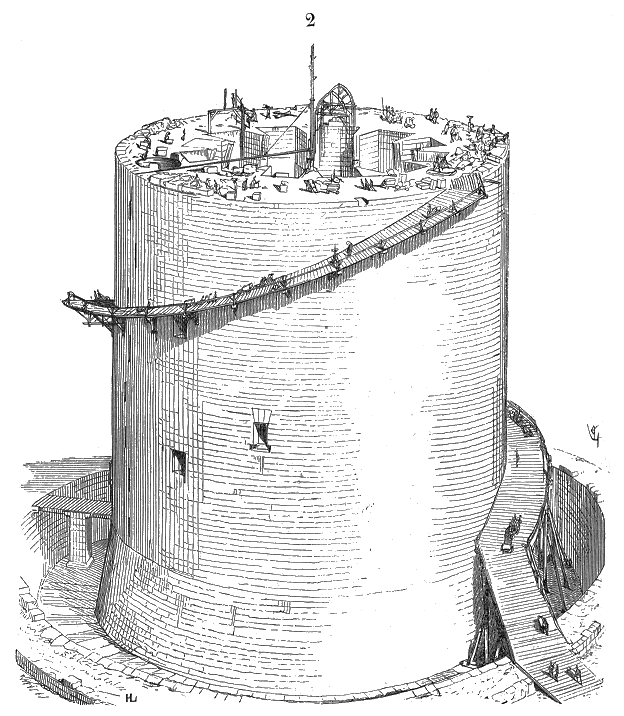
Cantilevered putlogs support the access ramp scaffold in this castle construction.

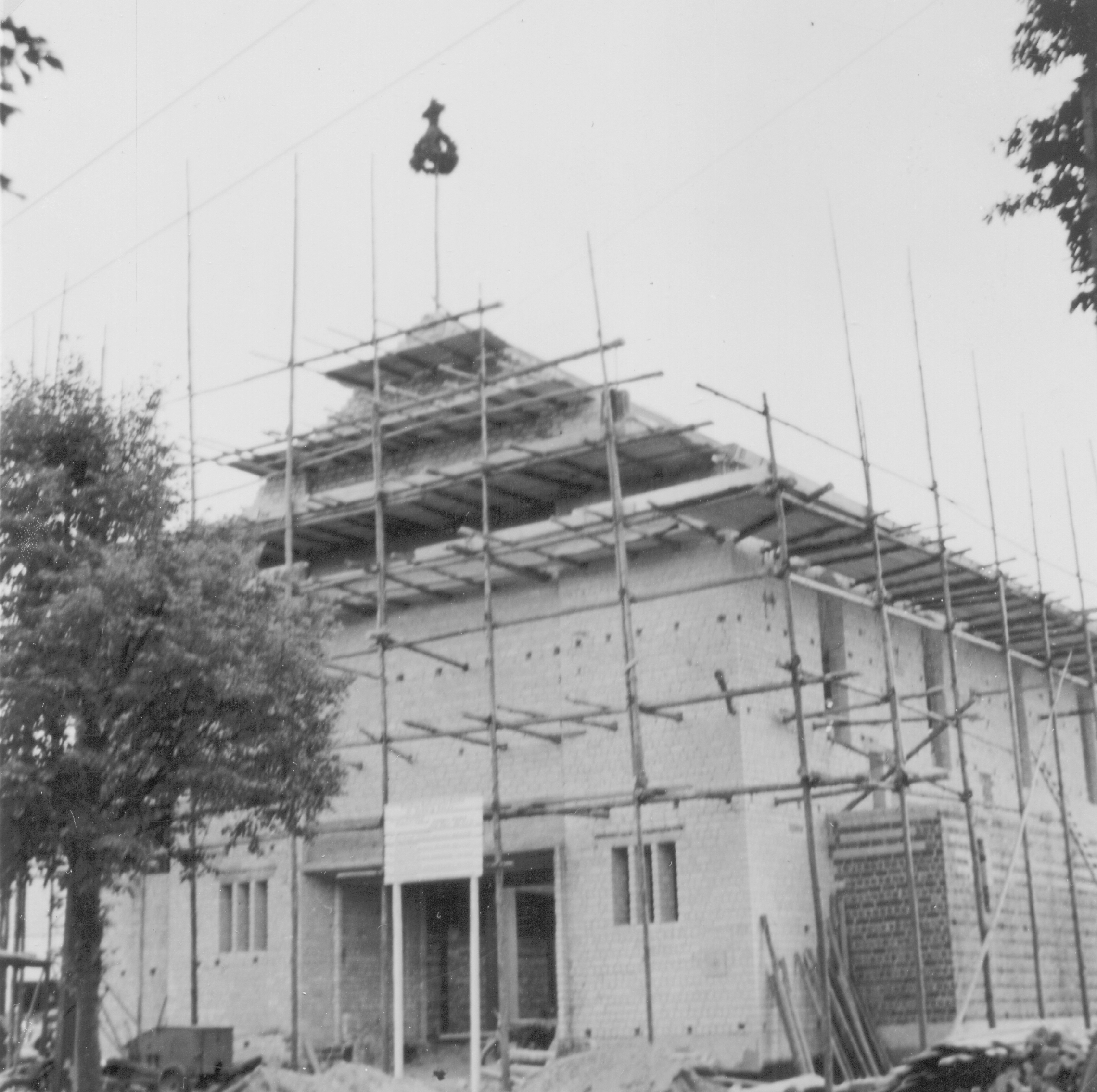
Most of the putlogs are still in place in this scaffolding; thus, the holes are visible.

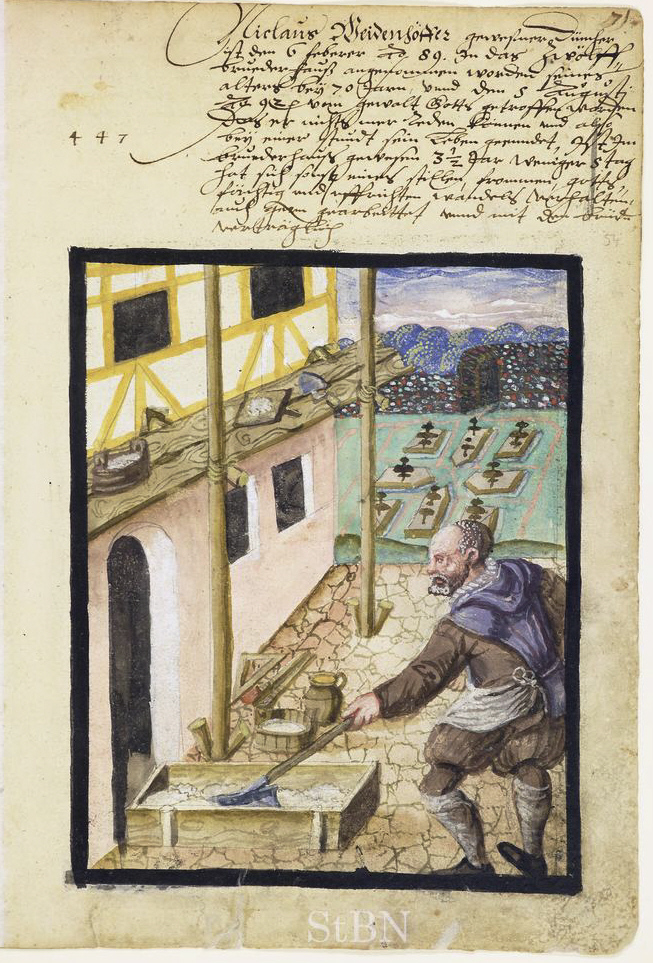
A German plasterer at work with putlogs going into the half-timbered (fachwerk) walls

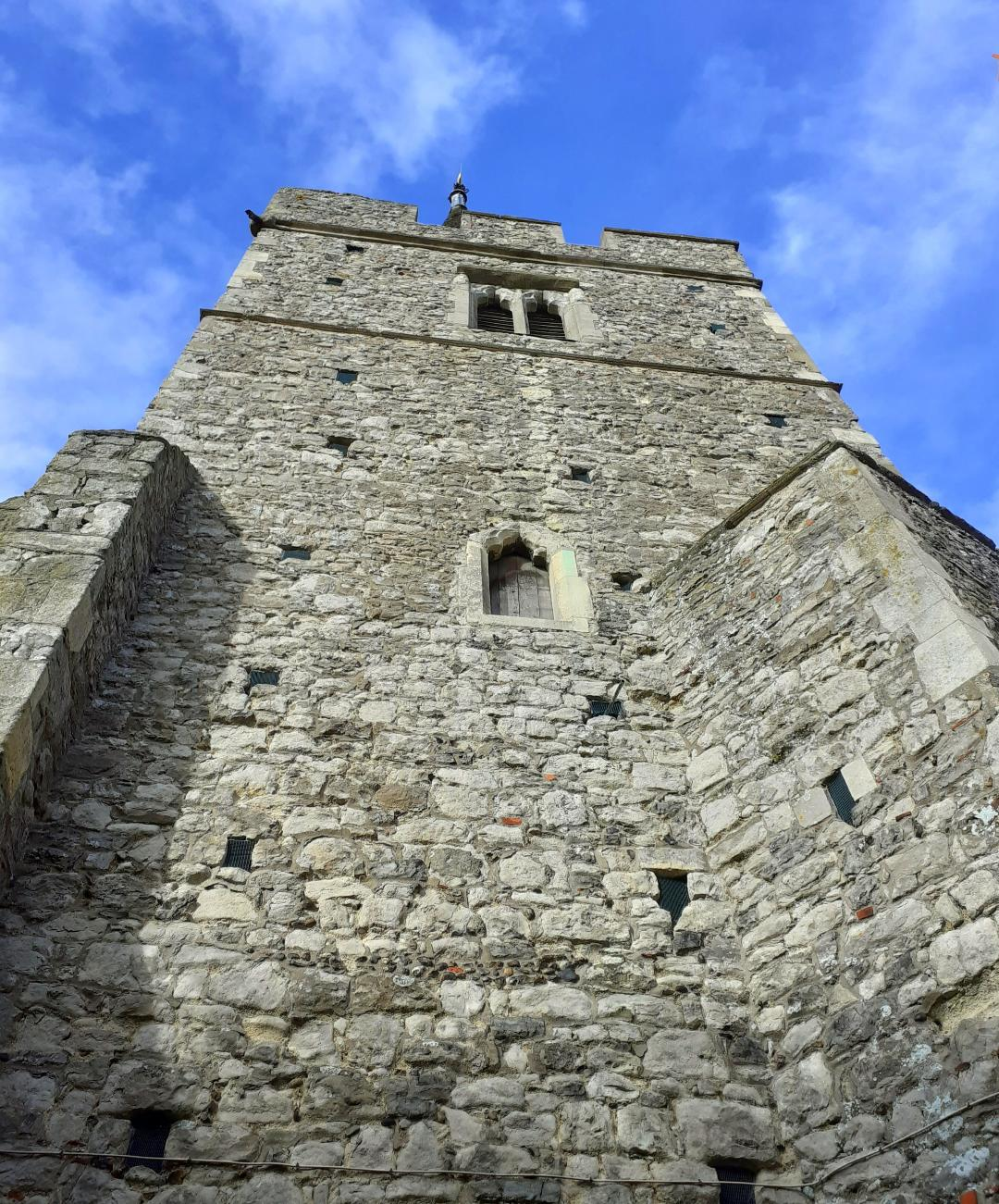
14th-century West Tower at St Mary Magdalene church, Great Burstead, Essex, showing original putlog holes from artisans

== See also ==
- Viga (architecture)
