= Vilsegg Castle =

Austrian castle

- Vils
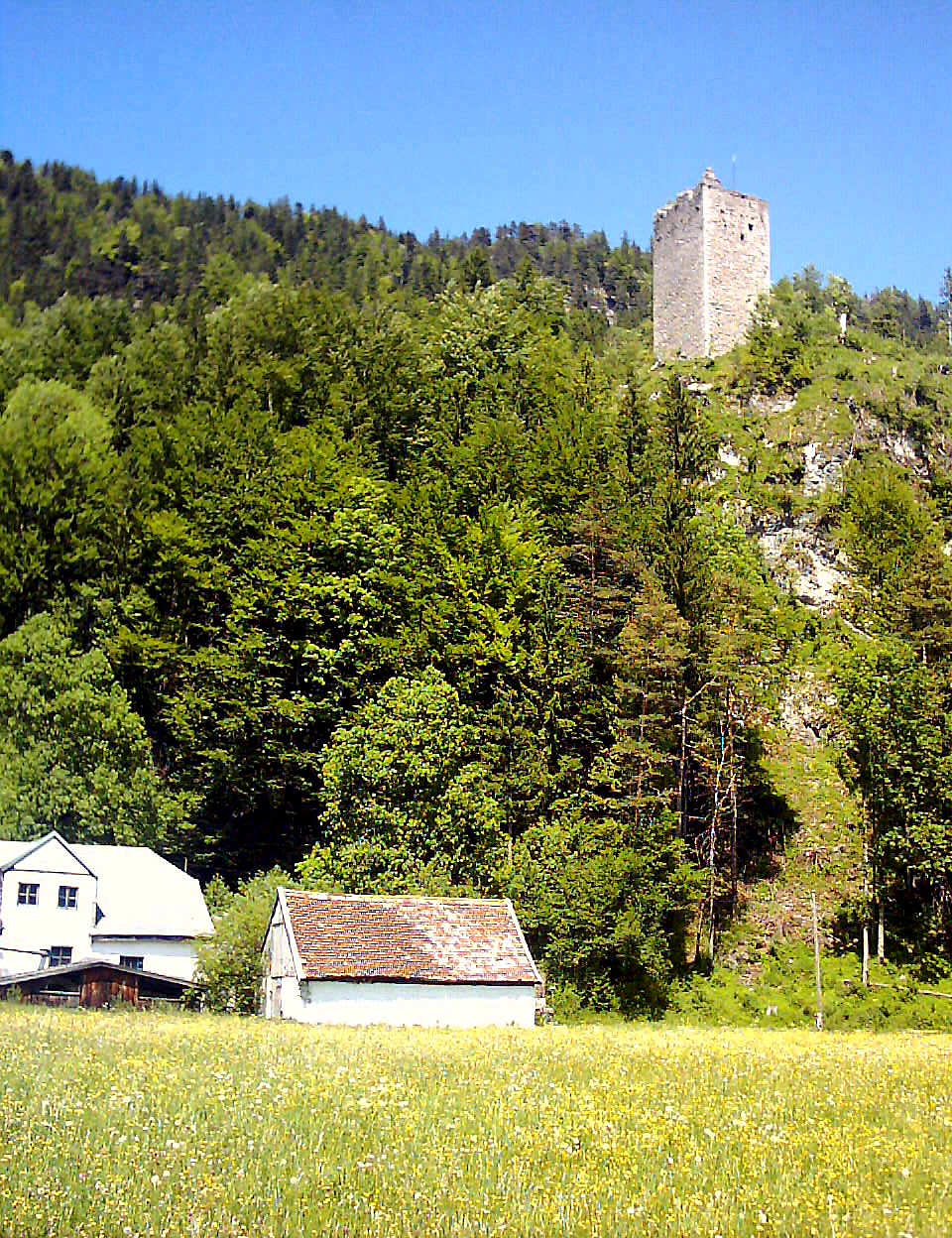
- Vilsegg Castle – the castle rocks and the bergfried

Site information
- Type: hill castle
- Code: AT-7
- Condition: ruin

Location
- Coordinates: 47°33′24″N 10°37′35″E
- Height: 887 m (AA)

Site history
- Built: around 1220 to 1230

Garrison information
- Occupants: ministeriales

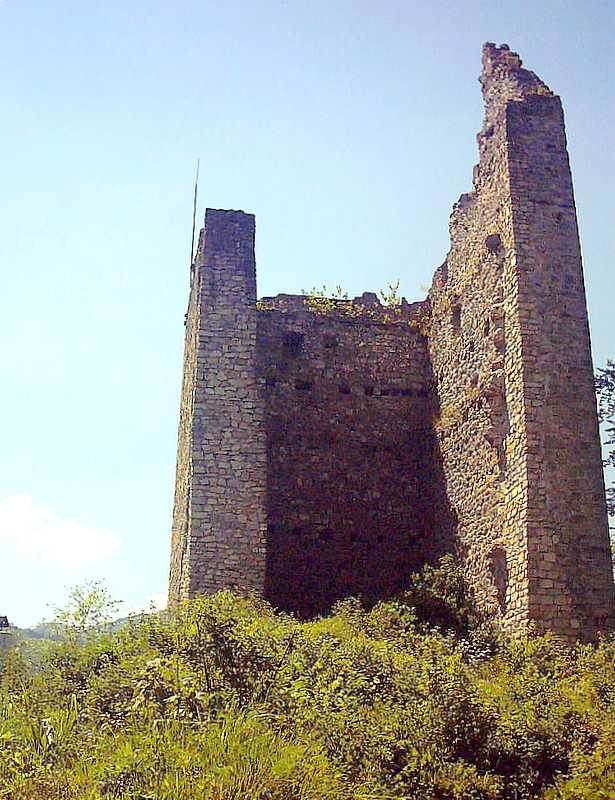
The Bergfried

Vilsegg Castle (German: Burg Vilsegg) is a former fortification in the Austrian state of Tyrol that stands about a kilometre northwest of the little town of Vils, between Pfronten and Füssen, a few hundred metres away from the Austro-German border.

== Location ==
The ruins of the hill castle stand about 60 metres (200 ft) above the Vils valley on an 887-metre-high rocky mountain on the edge of the Salober Mountains, which run along the border between Germany and Austria.

The castle hill drops steeply away on all sides; thus the fortress was very difficult to attack despite its relatively low situation above the valley. Vilsegg lies about 350 metres (1,150 ft) lower than its neighbouring castle on the German side of the border – the Falkenstein.

== History ==
In 1263, Henry of Vilsegg, a Dienstmann of the lords of Hohenegg, was mentioned as being at the castle. The Hoheneggs were, in turn, vassals (Lehnsmänner) of the Bishopric of Kempten. The castle had probably been built by around 1220/30 and is one of the most important examples of Hohenstaufen architecture in Tyrol.

The ministeriales of Vilsegg were last mentioned in 1314; after that the Hoheneggs themselves occupied the castle.

At the start of the 14th century Count Meinhard II of Tyrol sought to enlarge his territory at the expense of his neighbours. He also seized several castles belonging to the Hoheneggs, such as the nearby cave castle of Loch near Pinswang; however, Vilsegg held this at least until 1408 as a fief of the Bishopric of Kempten. Finally the bishopric enfeoffed the Duke of Austria with the castle and lordship, both of which were granted as an afterlehen to the Hoheneggs.

In 1671, John Francis, the last of the Hoheneggs, died and the subfief was returned to Austria; the Roman-German emperor was therefore legally a direct vassal of the bishopric in respect of the Barony of Vilsegg. The castle was occupied until at least 1709 by Austrian governors (Pfleger), but is shown on a 1774 map as a ruin.

1806 saw its transfer to the Kingdom of Bavaria, but in 1816 the town, castle and barony was finally returned to Austria as a result of the Congress of Vienna.

In 1939, large sections of the walls collapsed during an earthquake (for example the east wall of the bergfried with its elevated entrance). In 1953 the bergfried was made safe by the Austrian Federal Monuments Department. Currently the remaining wall remnants of the palas and the castle defences are being uncovered and repaired.

== Description ==
Of the relatively small castle, little remains apart from the mighty bergfried remains.

A steep path leads from the Chapel of St Anne below the castle to the former external gateway. The wall up to the bergfried has largely survived. After a further 50 metres (160 ft) of steep climb the visitor reaches the few remains of the enceinte and palas. To the west and somewhat higher up rise the impressive remains of the almost square bergfried which measures 10.7 by 10.1 metres (35 by 33 ft). The mighty tower appears to have been inhabited at least some of the time, as the window openings bear witness, and had originally four unvaulted floors and a battlemented fighting platform. Later, the height of the tower was increased and covered with a gable roof. The wall thickness of the lower storeys is just under 2 metres (7 ft); the east wall has been missing since the 1939 earthquake.

== Literature ==
- Toni Nessler: Burgen im Allgäu, Vol. 2: Burgruinen im Westallgäu und im angrenzenden Vorarlberg, im württembergischen Allgäu, im nördlichen Allgäu um Memmingen, im nordöstlichen Allgäu um Kaufbeuren und Obergünzburg sowie im östlichen Allgäu und im angrenzenden Tirol. 1st edition, Allgäuer Zeitungsverlag, Kempten, 1985, ISBN 3-88006-115-7, pp. 252–261.
- Oswald Trapp: Tiroler Burgenbuch. Vol. 7: Oberinntal und Ausserfern. Athesia u. a., Bozen/Innsbruck/Vienna, 1986, ISBN 88-7014-391-0.
