= Osterburg (Weida) =

Castle in Weida, Thuringia, Germany

- The fortified house at Weida
- Weida
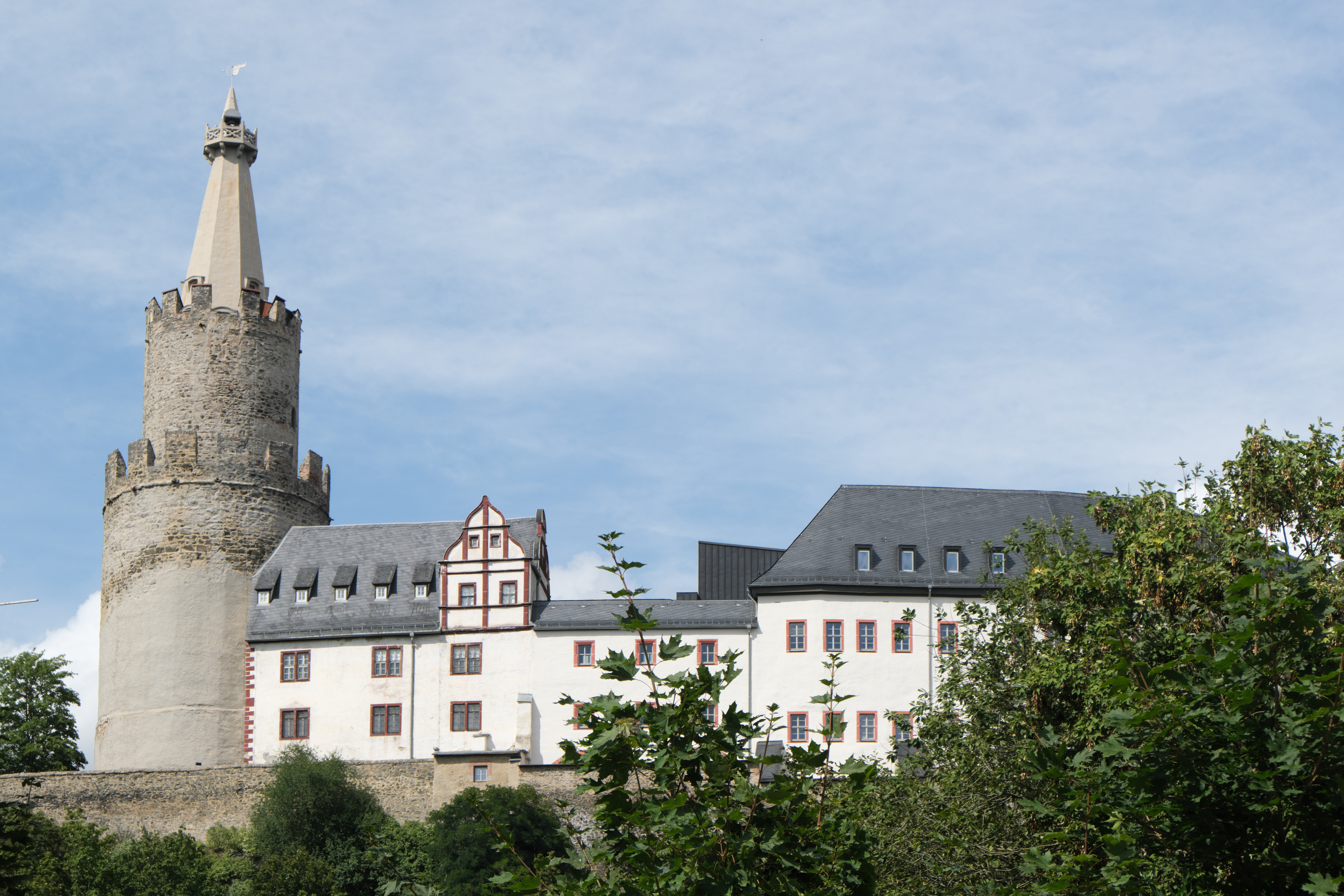
- The Osterburg in Weida

Site information
- Type: hill castle
- Code: DE-TH
- Condition: preserved or largely preserved

Location
- Coordinates: 50°46′21″N 12°03′24″E

Site history
- Built: 1163 to 1193

The Osterburg (German: [ˈoːstɐbʊʁk]) is a castle located conspicuously on a hill in the middle of the town of Weida in the county of Greiz in the German state of Thuringia.

== Description ==
Its 54-metre-high bergfried is the third highest and one of the oldest surviving bergfrieds in Germany. Above its second array of battlements there is a watchman's parlour, which accommodated a watchman until 1917. On the terrace there is a monument which records that this was the furthest south that the ice sheet came in Germany during the Elster glaciation.

== Gallery ==
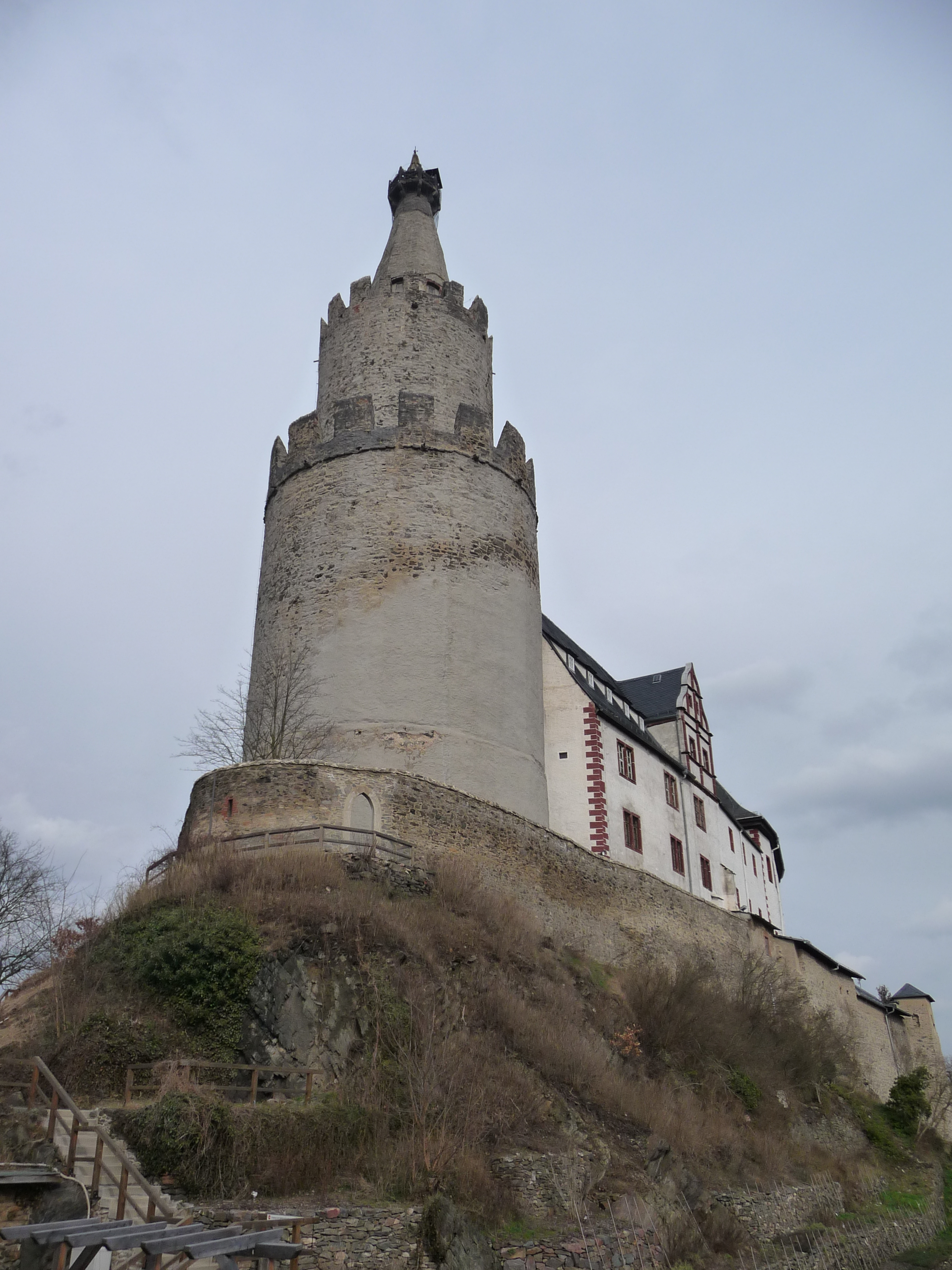

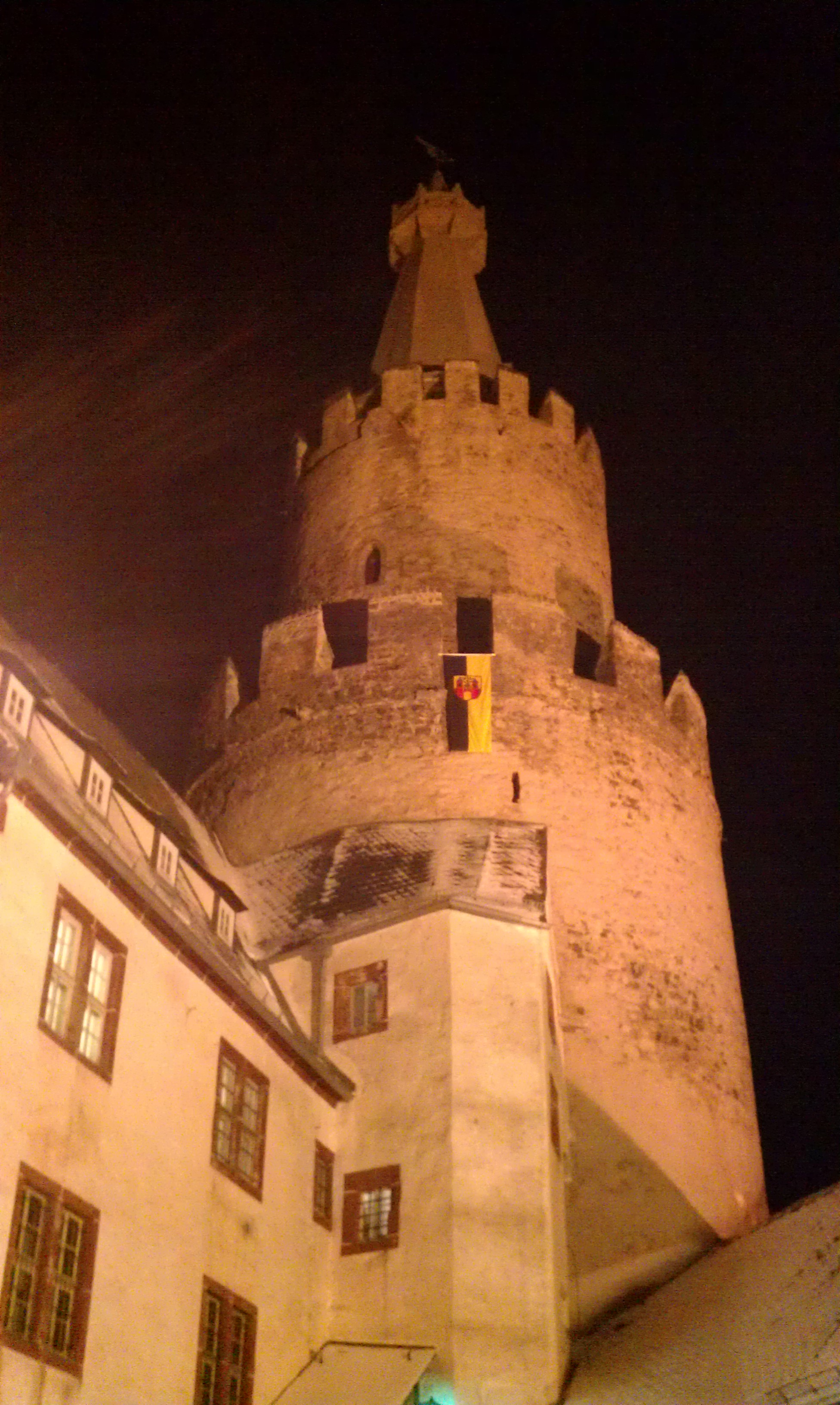

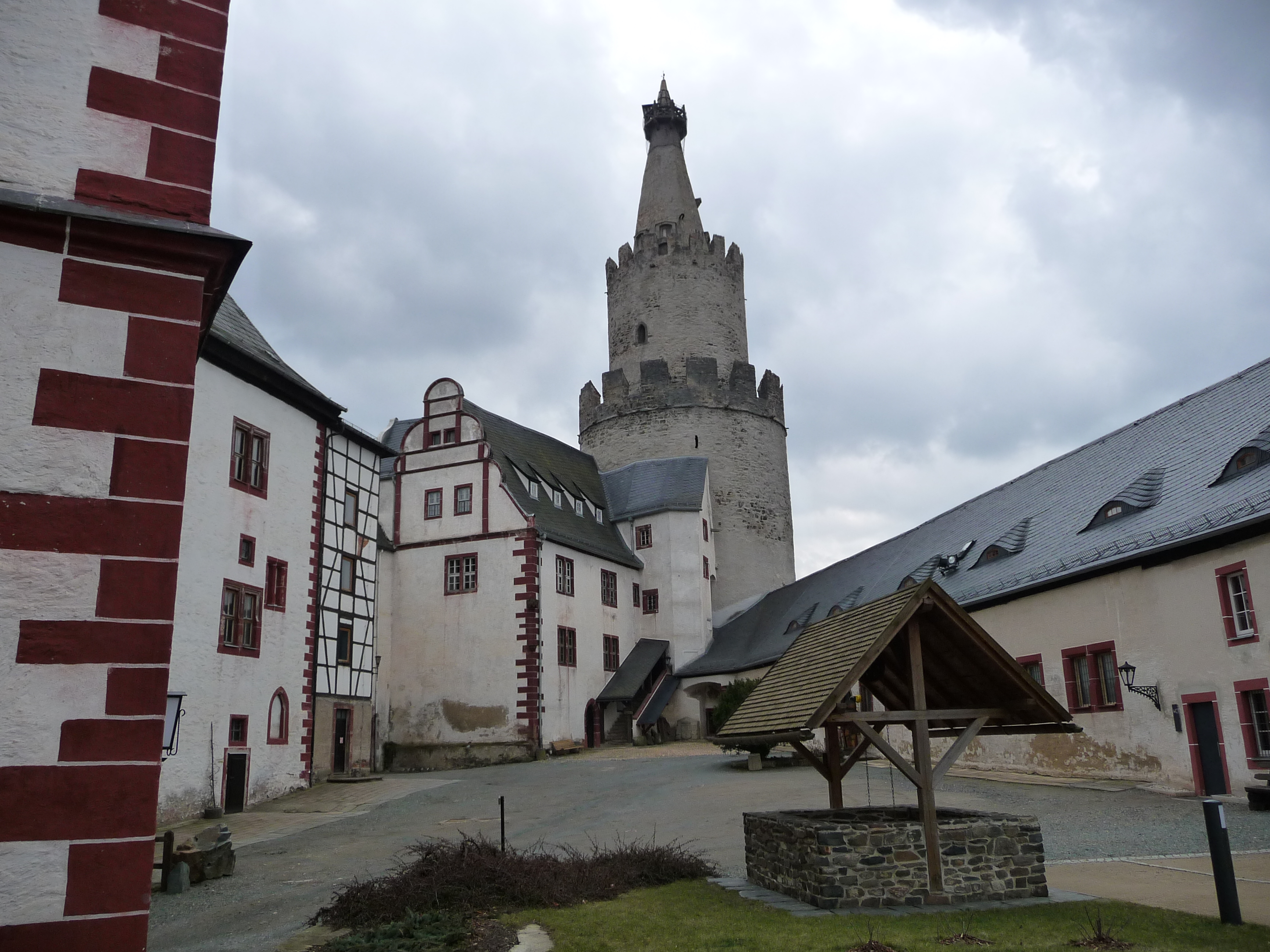

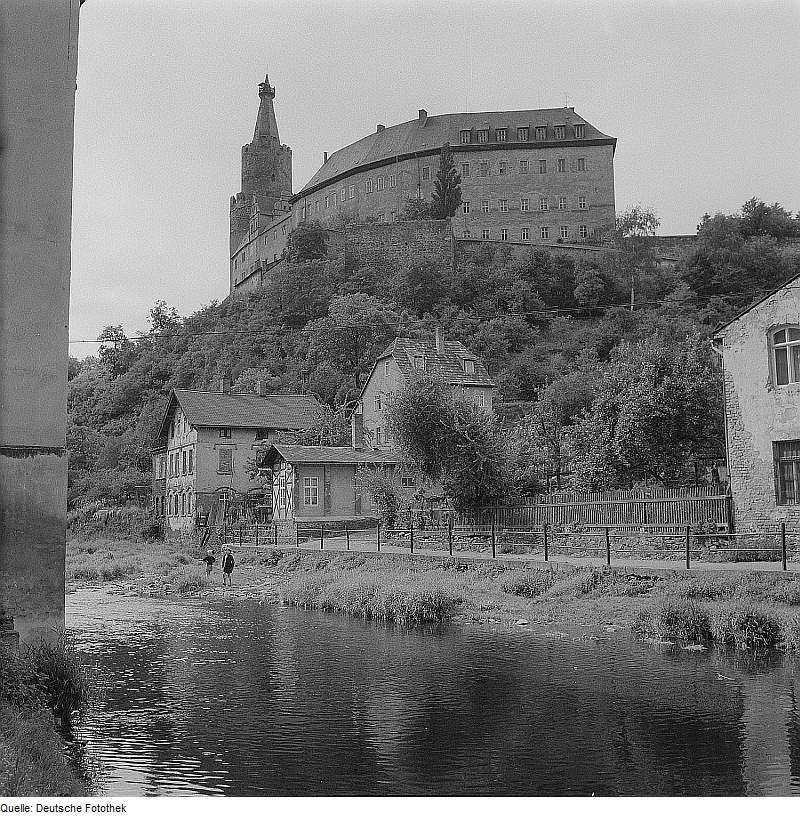

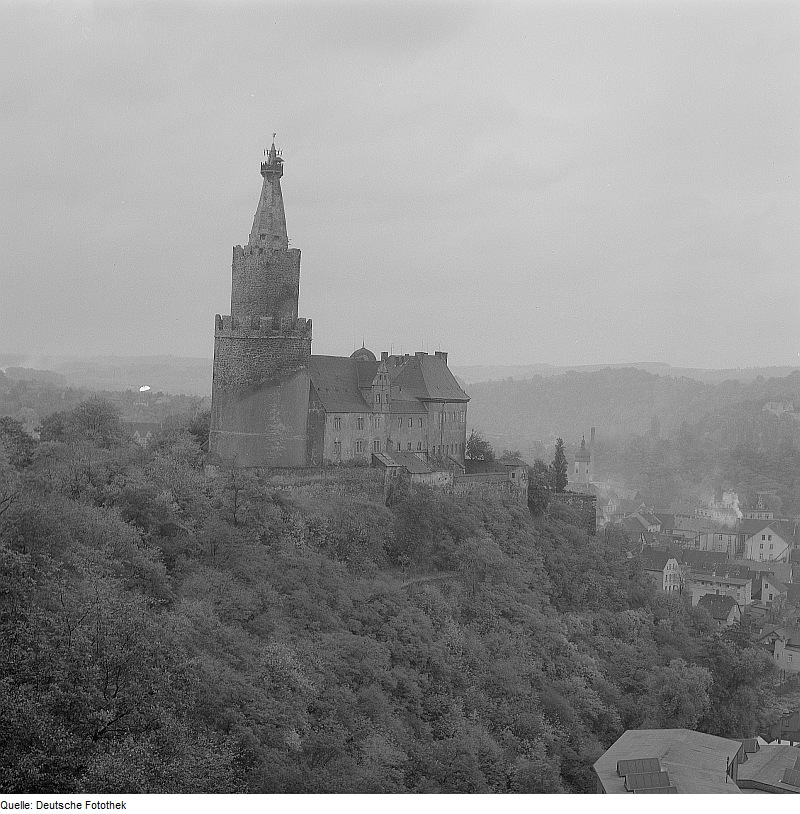

== Sources ==
- Henriette Joseph, Haik Thomas Porada (eds.): Das nördliche Vogtland um Greiz. (Landschaften in Deutschland Werte der deutschen Heimat, Vol. 68). Böhlau, Cologne etc., 2006, ISBN 3-412-09003-4.
- Rosemarie Bimek, Heinz Fischer, Roland Gehring, Dr. Egbert Richter, Kurt Häßner, Dieter Hauer, Günter Kummer: 800 Jahre Osterburg, Weida in Thüringen. Stadtverwaltung Weida in Thüringen, Heimatmuseum Osterburg, Altenburg, 1993, pp. 1–52.
