= Bergfried =

Type of fortified tower

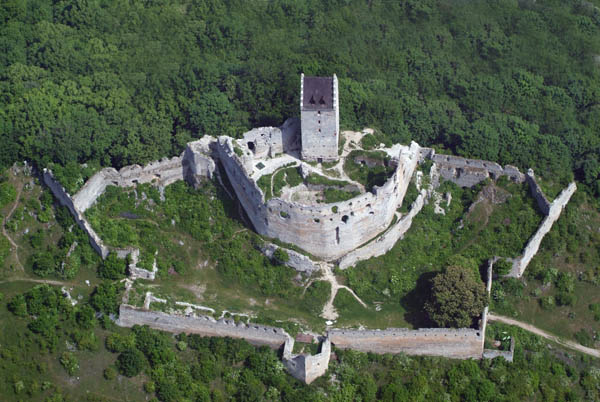
Topoľčany Castle, Slovakia. Three lines of defence are perfectly depicted here: Renaissance bastions, central Gothic fortification and a bergfried as the last refuge.

Bergfried (plural: Bergfriede; English: belfry; French: tour-beffroi; Italian: torrione; Castilian: torre del homenaje) is a tall tower that is typically found in castles of the Middle Ages in German-speaking countries and in countries under German influence. Stephen Friar in the Sutton Companion to Castles describes a bergfried as a "free-standing, fighting-tower". Its defensive function is to some extent similar to that of a keep (also known as a donjon) in English or French castles. However, the characteristic difference between a bergfried and a keep is that a bergfried was typically not designed for permanent habitation.

== Overview ==
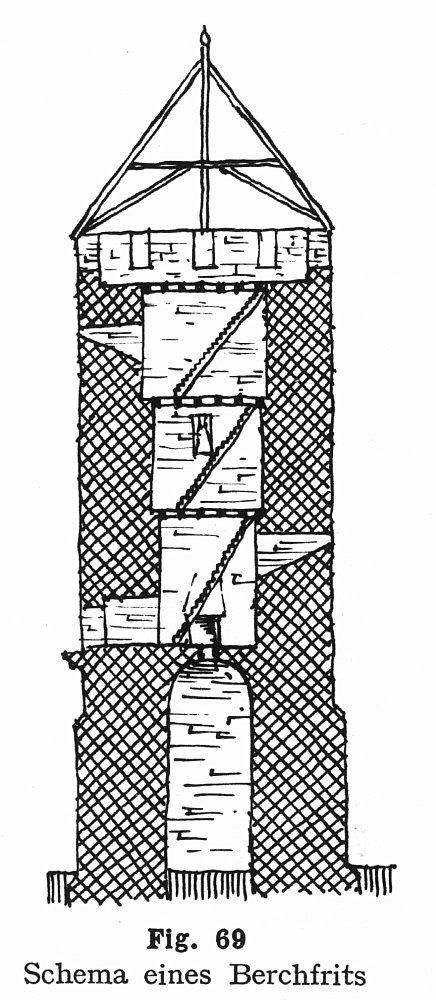
Cross section of a typical bergfried, from Piper's classic text

The living quarters of a castle with a bergfried are separate, often in a lower tower or an adjacent building called a palas (an English-style keep combines both functions of habitation and defence.) Consequently, a bergfried could be built as a tall slender tower with little internal room, few vaults and few if any windows. The bergfried served as a watchtower and as a refuge during sieges (at least if the siege was relatively brief). The distinction between a bergfried and a keep is not always clear-cut, as there were thousands of such towers built with many variations. There are some French keeps with only austere living quarters, while some late bergfrieds in Germany were intended to be habitable (Piper 1900).

For maximum protection, the bergfried could be sited on its own in the centre of the castle's inner bailey and totally separate from the enceinte. Alternatively, it could be close to or up against the outer curtain wall on the most vulnerable side as an additional defence, or project from the wall. For instance, the Marksburg has its bergfried in the centre, and Katz Castle on the most likely direction of attack. Some, like Münzenberg and Plesse Castles, have two bergfrieds.

Outside Germany, the crusader castles of Montfort Castle and Khirbat Jiddin built by the Teutonic Order had prominent towers that some authors have compared to bergfrieds (Kennedy 2000, Folda 2005), arguing that these castles depended more on Rhineland than local crusader traditions of military architecture.

Eynsford Castle in Kent is a rare English example, where the bergfried is the central element of the design.

== Etymology ==
The word '"bergfried", sometimes rendered perfrit, berchfrit or berfride and many similar variants in medieval documents, did not just refer to a castle tower, but was used to describe most other types of tower, such as siege towers, bell towers (cf. its cognate belfried or belfry) or storage buildings. The main tower of a castle was often simply referred to as a "tower" (Turm) or "big tower" (großer Turm). In late medieval Low German documents, however, the terms berchfrit, berchvrede and similar variants often appeared in connexion with smaller castles.

German castle research during the 19th century introduced Bergfried or Berchfrit as the general term for a non-residential main tower, and these terms then became established in the literature.

The etymological origin of the word is unclear. There are theories about it being derived from Middle High German or Latin, or even from a Greek word brought back from the Crusades. A theory that is often stated in older texts, that the bergfried took its name from the phrase "weil er den Frieden berge" ("because it keeps the peace"), i.e. it guaranteed the security of the castle, cannot be confirmed.

== Development and forms ==
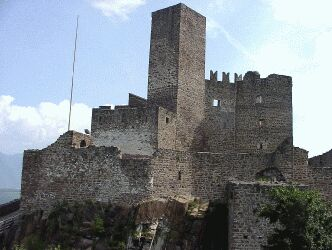
The bergfried in the centre of the site dominates the silhouette of Hocheppan in South Tyrol, Italy

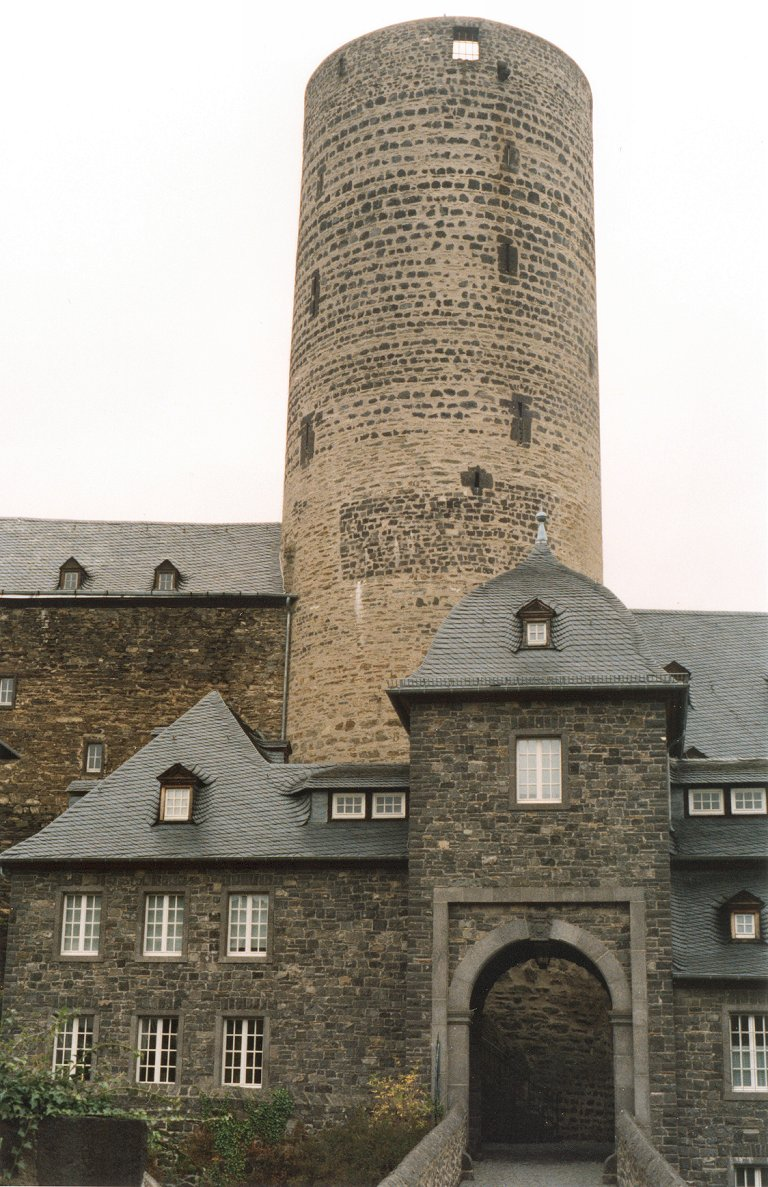
The bergfried near the gate of Genovevaburg, Mayen, Germany

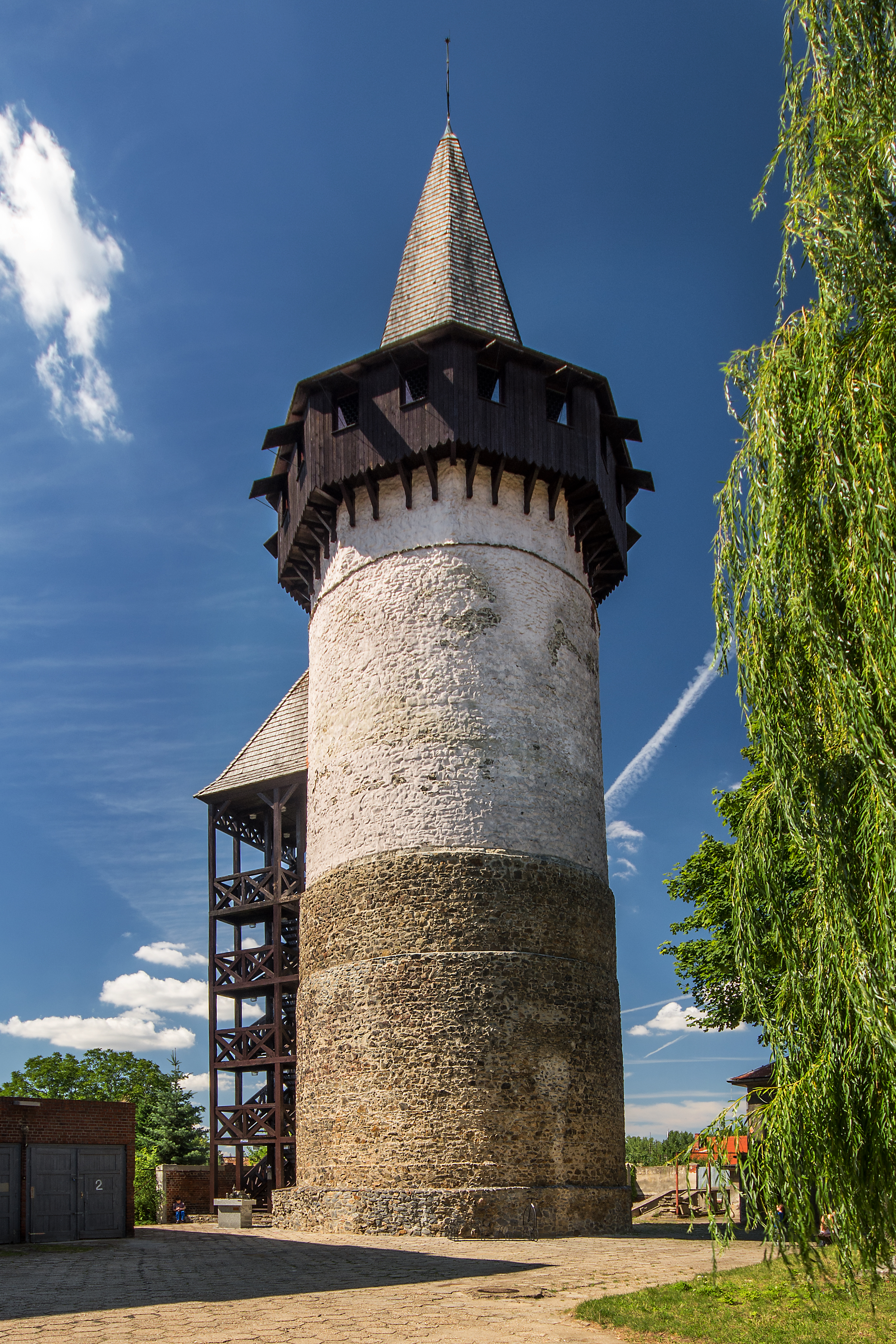
The bergfried of the Prudnik Castle from the 13th century in Prudnik, Poland, one of the oldest buildings of this type in Poland

The bergfried established itself as a new type of building during the 12th century and from about 1180 to the 14th century increasingly became a feature of the Central European castles. Numerous examples have survived from this period almost to their full height. However the origin of the design is not fully understood, since towers dating from before the 12th century have had to be almost entirely excavated archaeologically, and only the lowest sections remain. Individual examples (like the bergfried of Habsburg Castle) may also be found dating to as early as the second half of the 11th century. The precursor of the bergfried is the fortified tower house, whose Western European expression is called a donjon or keep.

Residential towers were common before the advent of the bergfried in German-speaking countries, too; a precursor is found, for example, in the wooden tower of the motte-and-bailey castle. Donjons combine the two contrasting functions of a stately, comfortable residence and a fortification. The bergfried, however, dispenses with the keep's residential function in favour of its defensive purposes. At the same time, new forms of unfortified residential building became popular, the palas, for example, was incorporated into castle construction. The emergence of the bergfried is thus clearly related to the differentiation of living and fortification within a castle. In Western Europe however, the donjon or keep, with their combination of domestic and defensive functions, continued to be predominant during the course of the Middle Ages.

Often the bergfried forms the main tower in the centre of the castle or is positioned as a wall tower on the main avenue of attack against the castle (especially in the case of spur castles). It may be an isolated structure standing alone amongst the other buildings of the castle or be joined to them to form a combined building complex. However, typically, the bergfried is a self-contained element that is not internally connected to other buildings and has its own access. As a rule, this is a so-called elevated entrance, i.e. the entrance is located at the level of an upper floor of the tower and is accessed via its own bridge, staircase or ladder.

Bergfrieds very often have a square or round floor plan, but pentagonal towers are also frequently encountered; whilst octagonal towers are rather less common. There are even a few examples of bergfrieds with irregular polygonal floor plans. A rare form is the triangular bergfried of Grenzau Castle near Höhr-Grenzhausen or that of Rauheneck Castle near Baden bei Wien. Towers with triangular and pentagonal floor plans invariably had a corner facing the main line of attack on the castle.

Bergfrieds averaged 20 to 30 metres in height, although those at Forchtenstein Castle in Burgenland, Austria, and Freistadt Castle reach a height of 50 metres. Compared with the donjon, which occupies a relatively large ground area because of its elaborate interior layout with living rooms, a hall, kitchen, etc., the bergfried usually has a much smaller footprint, which, although of similar height to the donjon gives it the slimmer appearance of a tower. As a building, the bergfried has an even stronger vertical emphasis than the donjon.

Local rock was usually used for building material and was quarried in the immediate vicinity of the castle site. In areas where there was little usable rock, brick or fieldstone was used. The masonry work was often executed very carefully, edges being accentuated with rusticated ashlar. The bergfried could be plastered or the stonework could be left exposed. The latter was the case, for example, in the towers of the Hohenstaufen era which were entirely made of rusticated ashlar. The tower shaft (i.e., the main part of the tower between the base and the top floor) usually had no or very few windows; where they exist, they are often just a few narrow vertical slits.

The enormous wall thickness at basement level in many bergfrieds usually decreases significantly on the inside of the tower at the level of the upper floors. On the resulting wall ledges, wooden ceilings were laid that served to partition the various floor levels. The lowest floor and the uppermost floor are often covered by a stone vault. Occasionally, narrow stairways were incorporated into the masonry to allow a single person to climb the tower. More often, however, the floors were connected by wooden stairs or ladders. Some bergfrieds had limited living space, and even small fireplaces may be found in the upper floors. These heated rooms were usually used by the watchmen.

On many bergfrieds the original design of the top of the tower cannot be precisely ascertained. On the one hand, this is because the tops of the walls have become ruined and the wooden elements have rotted away, and on the other because bergfrieds in castles that were still inhabited in modern times were often given a new top section (e.g. Stein Castle, Rochsburg Castle). Furthermore, some towers that might look medieval at first glance are, in reality, 19th-century Historicist creations (e.g. the Wartburg of the 1850s) and some are even romanticized notions of medieval castle architecture (Château du Haut-Kœnigsbourg, 1909). Late medieval tower crowns (which themselves are often a remodelling of the original tops of the towers) have survived more often or can sometimes be reconstructed based on drawings (especially from the 16th & 17th centuries).

The terrace or fighting platform of a bergfried was originally often surrounded by battlement. Occasionally these crenellations have survived in their original state, especially where they were protected by subsequent roof or other superstructures (Wellheim Castle). The fighting platform could be either open or covered by a roof or spire. Depending on the floor plan of the tower, the latter would frequently either be a tented or a conical roof. The roof comprised a wooden truss covered with tiles or slates or, alternatively, was of solid stone. It often covered the entire fighting platform, so that the roof rested on the battlements. In other cases, it was set back, creating an open gangway between roof and battlements (e.g. the Rudelsburg and Osterburg). In covered fighting platforms there were similarly located window openings in place of the merlons that gave a panoramic view of the surrounding area and enabled the use of long-distance weapons (Idstein Castle, Sayn Castle). Some surviving ledges or beam holes on bergfrieds indicate, in some cases, that wooden superstructures were used. In the late Middle Ages, the tower roofs were often embellished with bartizans and other similar structures.

Larger ballistic weapons or catapults were only rarely positioned on the fighting platforms.

Large castles (e.g. Münzenberg Castle) and Ganerbenburgs (castles owned by more than one family simultaneously) sometimes had multiple bergfrieds for status or security reasons. Consisting of an inner bailey and two outer baileys, the very large castle of Neuenburg, the residence of the landgraves of Thuringia in Freyburg, Germany, used to have a bergfried in every part of the castle (the inner bailey and outer baileys 1 and 2), i.e. a total of three bergfrieds. The unusually large royal imperial castle of Kyffhausen Castle in the Kyffhäuser consisted of an upper bailey, a middle bailey and a lower bailey. In the upper and middle baileys, the two known bergfrieds have survived at least in remnants. Smaller castles sometimes had two bergfrieds too: the Kohren Castle in Kohren-Sahlis or the well-known Saaleck Castle at Bad Kösen, for instance.

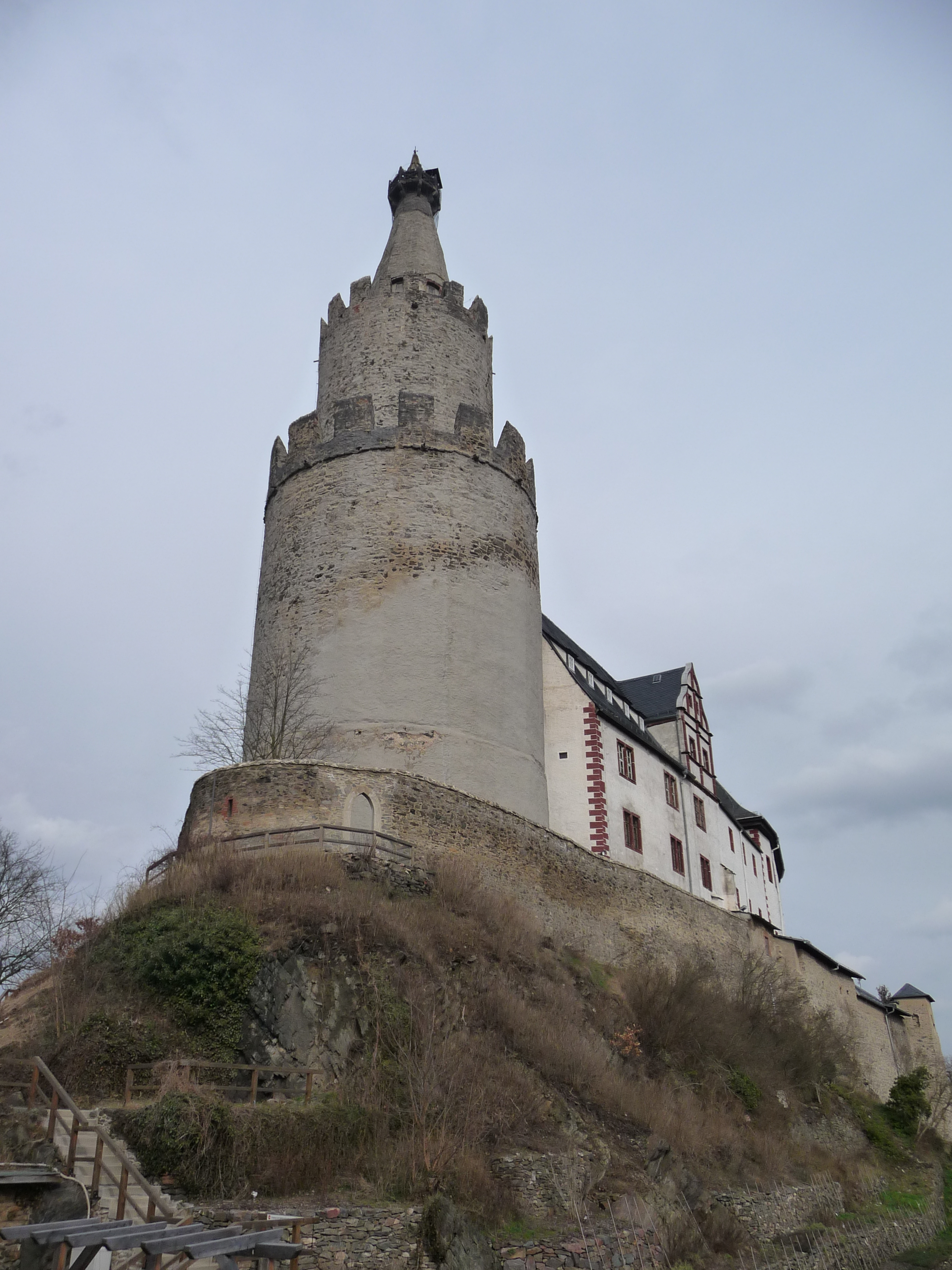
53-metre-high bergfried of the Osterburg in Weida, Thuringia

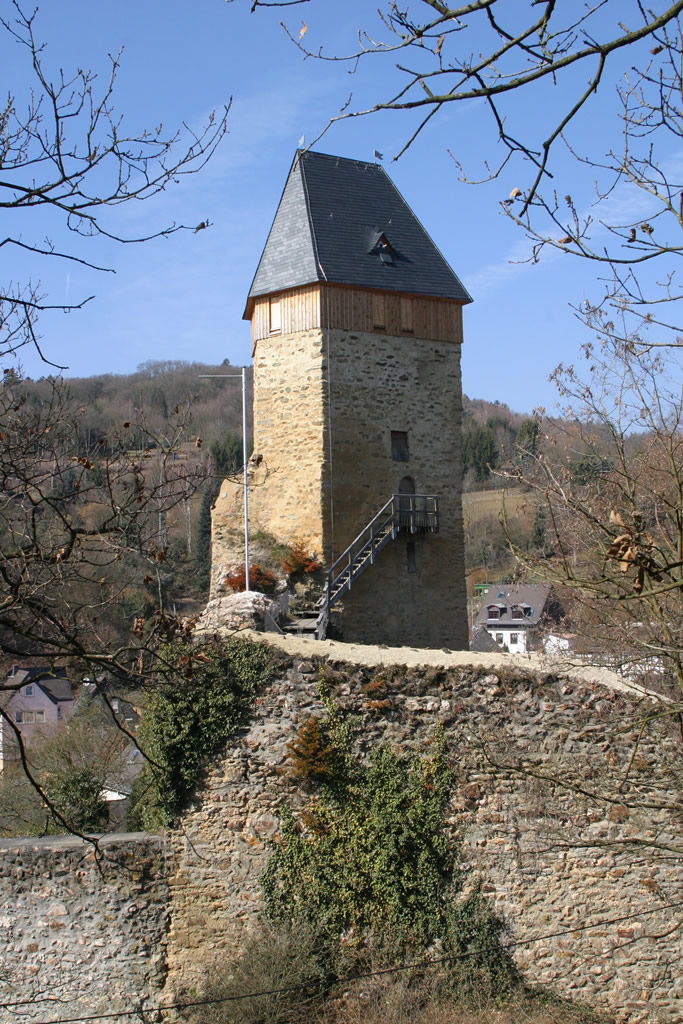
Pentagonal bergfried of Frauenstein near Wiesbaden, Germany. The roof and staircase to the elevated entrance have been reconstructed

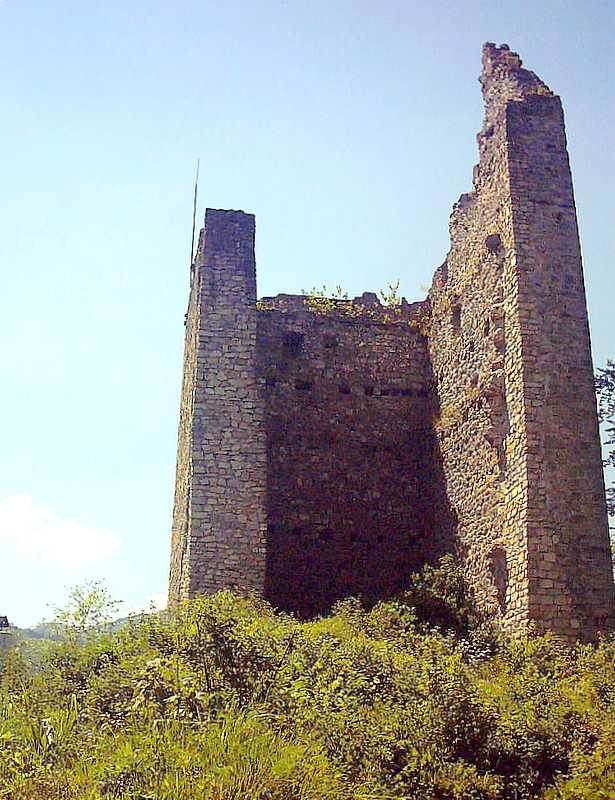
Bergfried of a ministerial castle in the Bishopric of Kempten: the two-part, residential main tower of Vilsegg Castle, Tyrol, Austria. The beam holes show where the former floors were

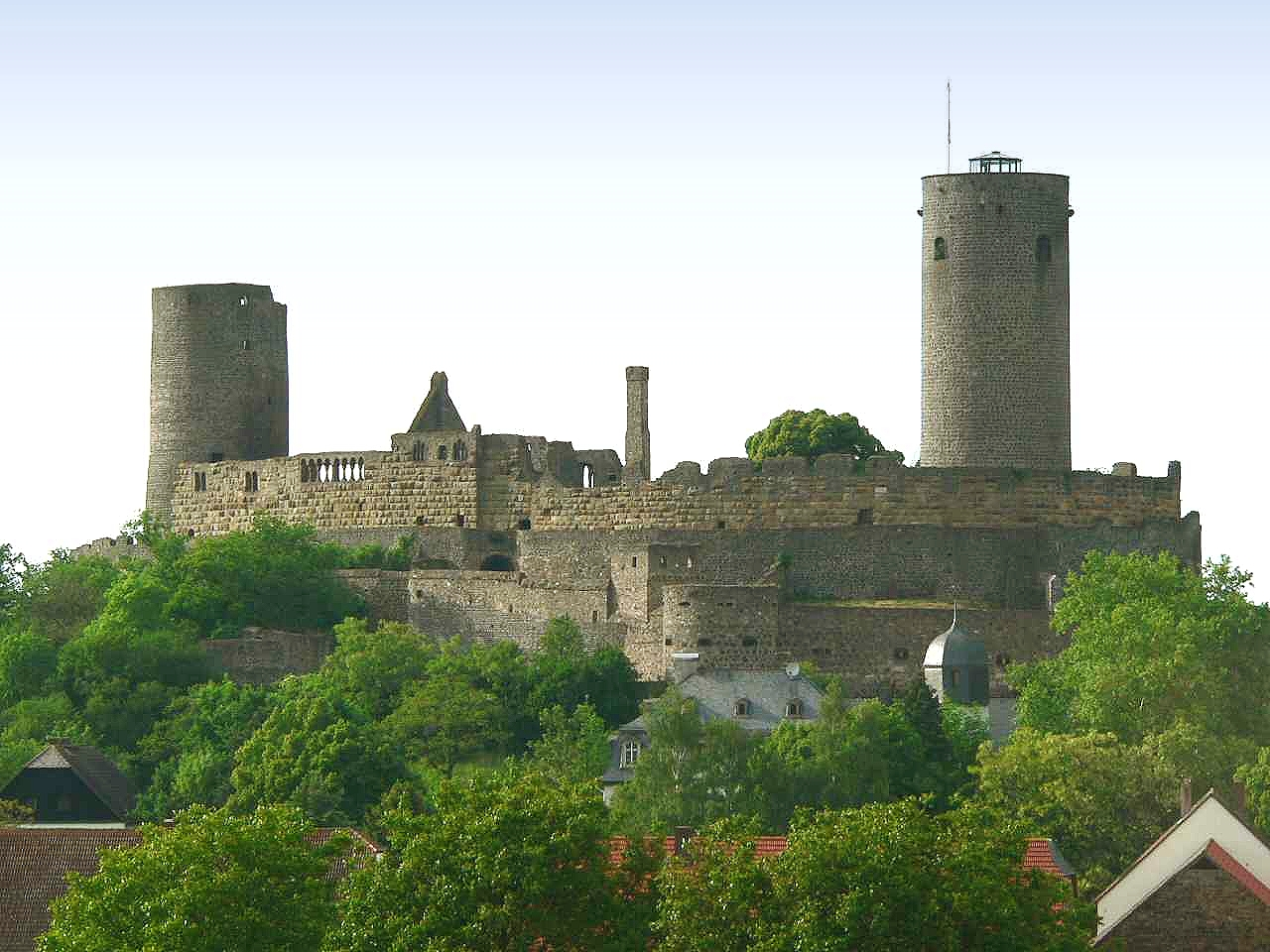
A large castle with 2 bergfrieds: the Hessian castle of Münzenberg, Central Germany

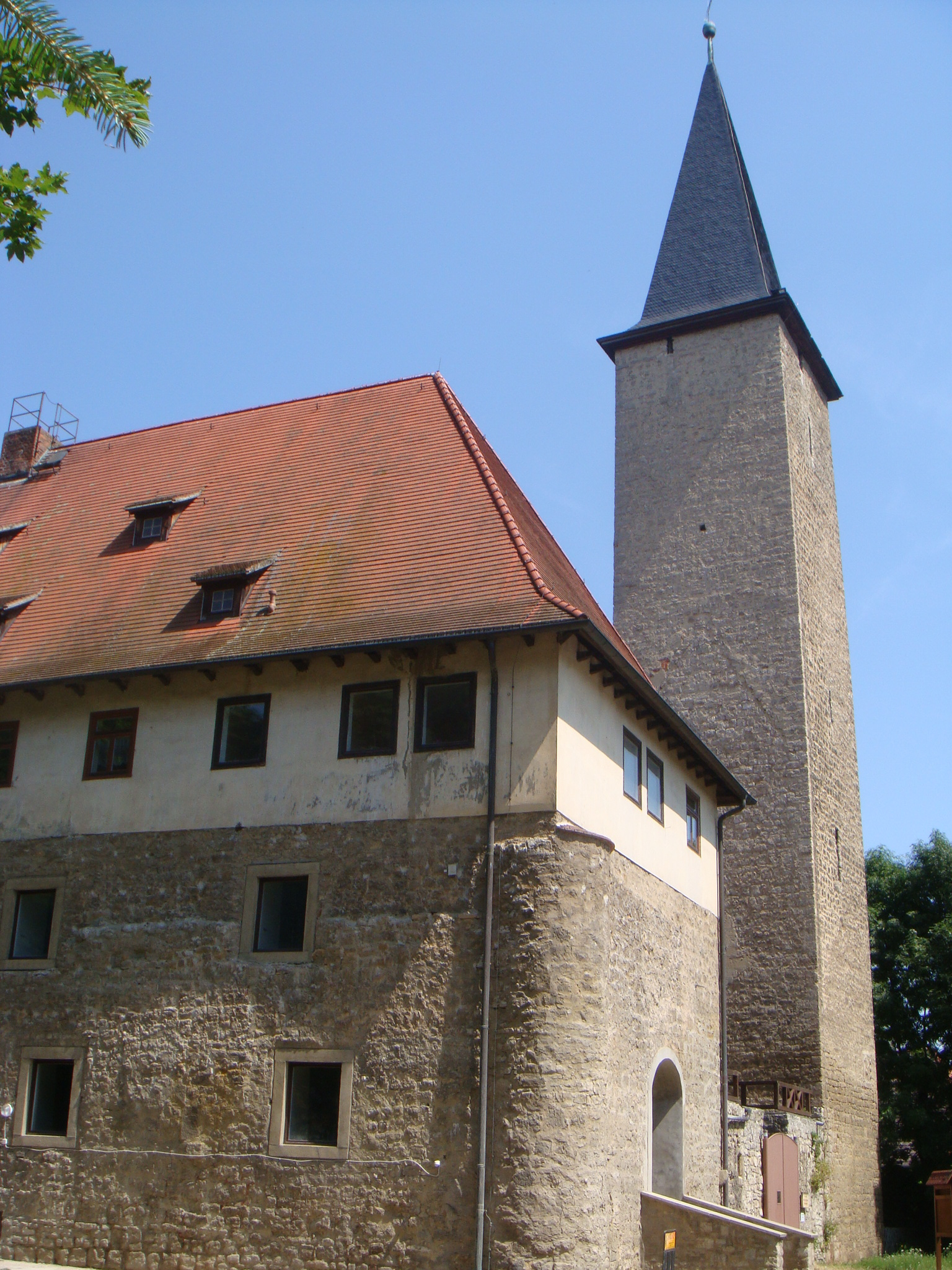
Water castle in Niederroßla with the highest bergfried in Germany: 57 metres high

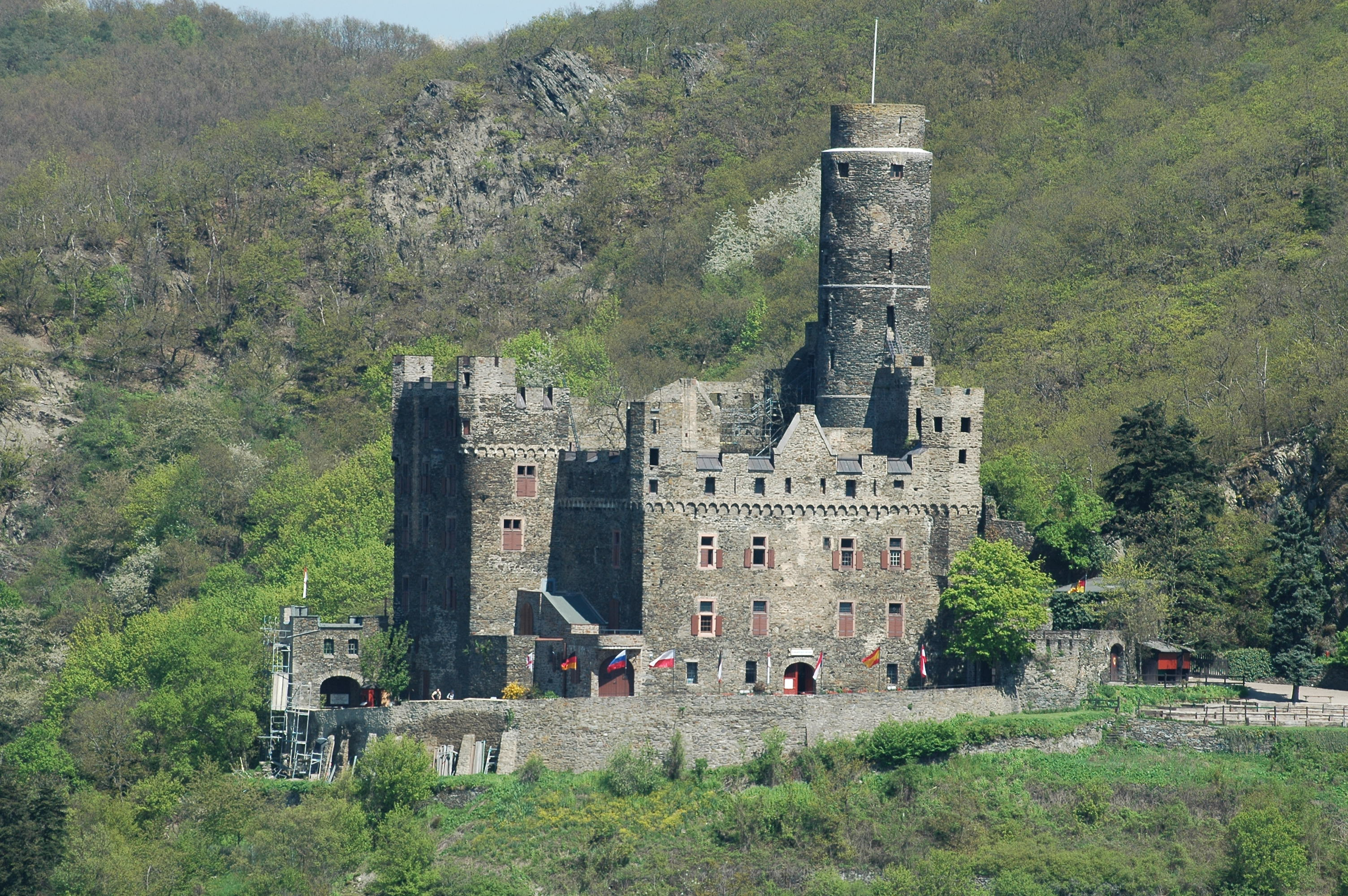
Maus Castle with its round bergfried

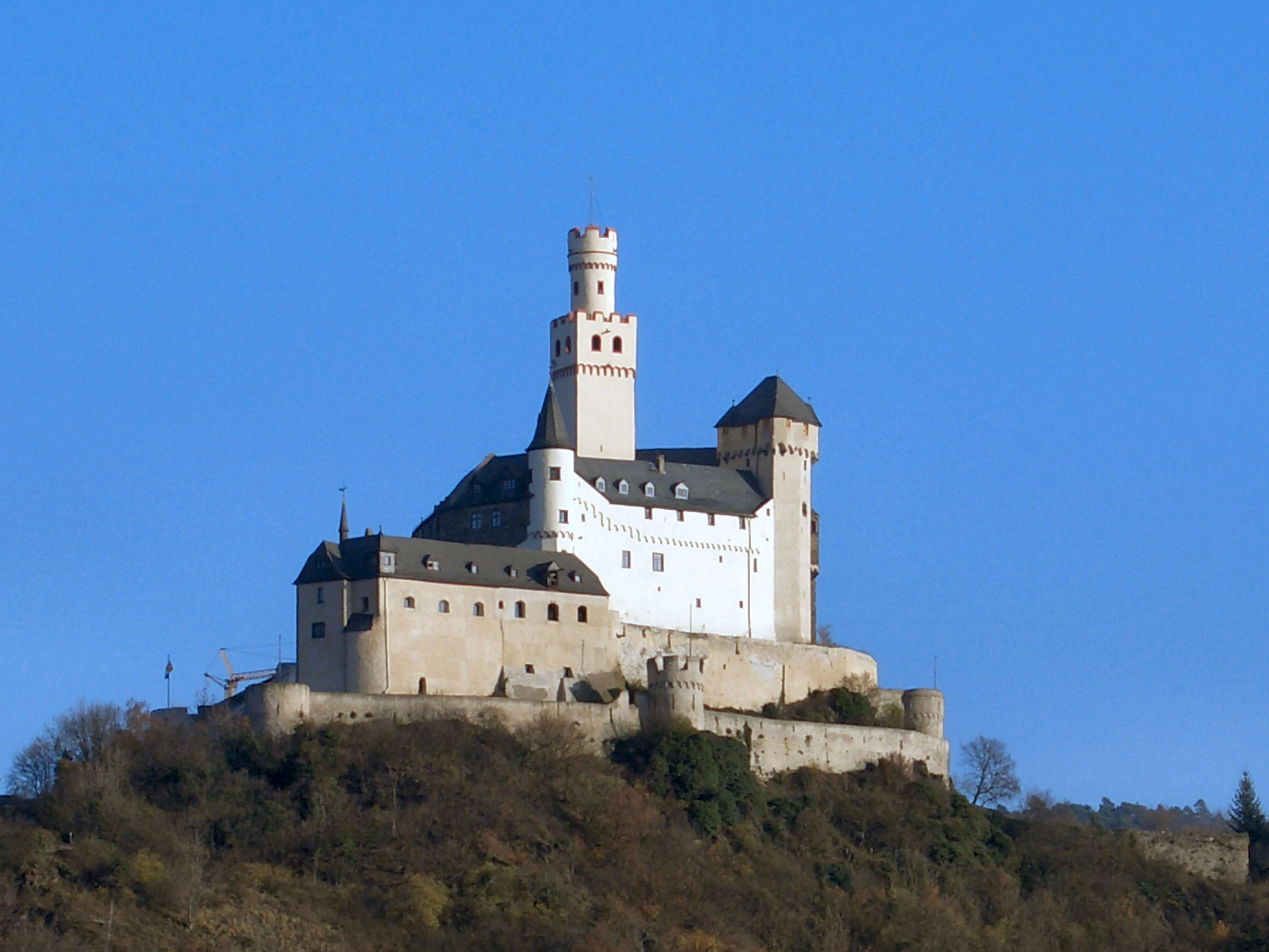
Marksburg: the bergfried has a square base topped by a round section

=== Octagonal bergfrieds ===
A rare form is the octagonal bergfried. The first appeared in a few Hohenstaufen-era castles in Baden-Württemberg, in the Alsace region and in Lower Italy. The best known is the bergfried of Steinsberg Castle. Frederick II's tower in Enna has an octagonal bergfried with a symmetrical octagonal enceinte. The octagonal bergfried of Gräfenstein Castle can be considered a special case in which plinth on the side facing the line of attack has been extended to form triangle, making the tower heptagonal.

In the post-Hohenstaufen period, octagonal bergfrieds appeared in Brick Gothic castles. The octagonal shape is adopted because of the brick construction, because angular shapes are preferred to round ones. A variant is the octagonal tower on a square plinth. Based on the castles of the Teutonic Order, this type of tower is also common in Central Poland (e.g. Brodnica, Człuchów, Lidzbark Warmiński). Occasionally Teutonic Order castles have such towers that are not executed in brick (e.g. Paide).

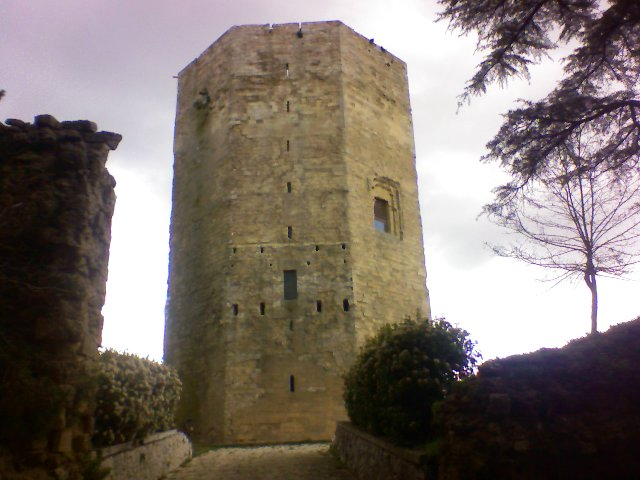
Frederick II's tower in Enna, South Italy.

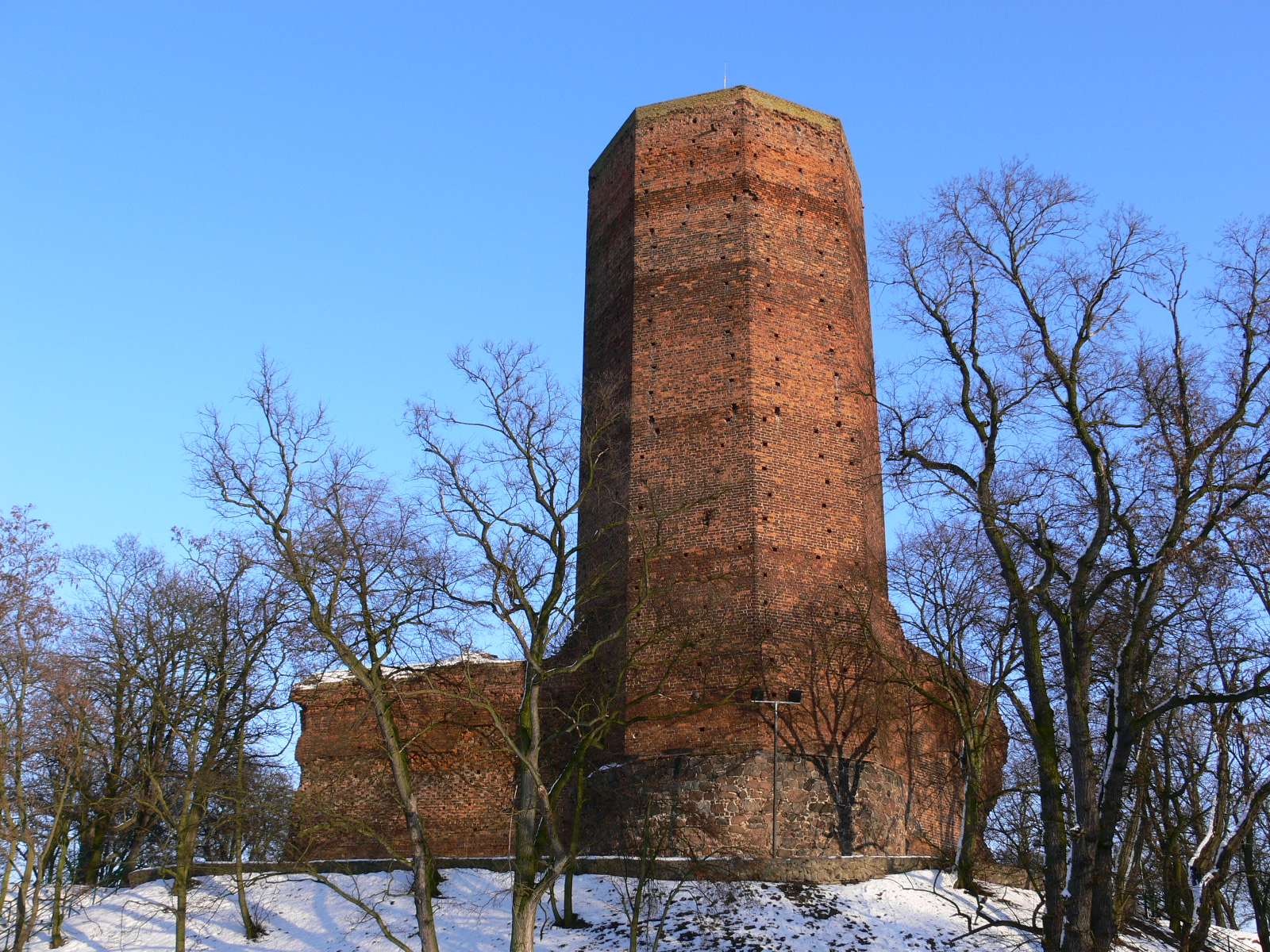
Kruszwica Castle in Poland

== Functions ==
The bergfried was a multi-functional building that could have various defensive functions, but which also had status value. In the last decade of the 20th century there has been discussion in the field of castle research about whether the bergfried's functions could be succinctly stated as a "fortification or (more likely) a status symbol." This has not, however, gained universal acceptance.

=== Defence ===
With its enormous wall mass - the plinth is even solid in some cases - the tower offered passive protection for the areas of the castle behind it. For this reason, at many castles the bergfried was situated on the main avenue of attack, often set into the front defensive wall. Thus, the bergfried was able to perform a similar function to the shield wall. This was particularly the case with castles in which shield wall and bergfried were interconnected to form a single structural unit (e.g. Liebenzell Castle in the Black Forest). So-called 'double bergfrieds' like that of the Greifenstein in Hesse and Rochlitz Castle in Saxony in a sense represent an intermediate stage between a bergfried and a shield wall The two closely spaced towers are linked by a narrow section of shield wall.

That bergfrieds with pentagonal or triangular plans are mostly aligned with a corner facing the main line of attack, is also associated with the shield function: stone projectiles hurled by catapults were deflected laterally by the oblique angle of impact. In some cases, such "deflection wedges" (Prallkeile) were also added to the tower later, and they can even be found on towers with an otherwise circular plan (e.g. the Zvíkov Castle in Bohemia and Forchtenstein Castle in Austria). A square bergfried set up on a corner could also serve this purpose. In other cases, the acute-angled floor plan is, however, simply due to the natural shape of the bedrock

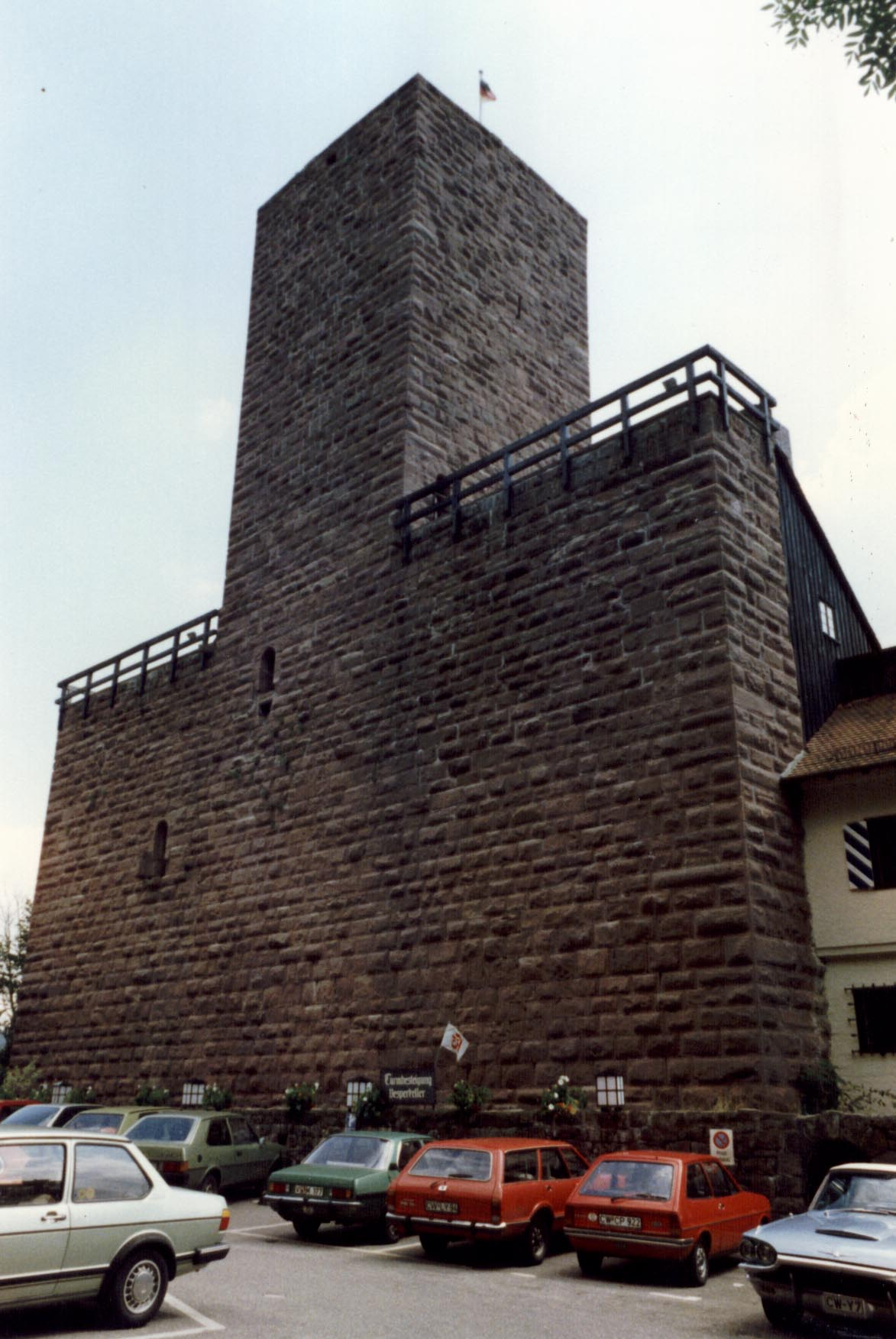
Combination of shield wall and bergfried at Liebenzell Castle, South Germany

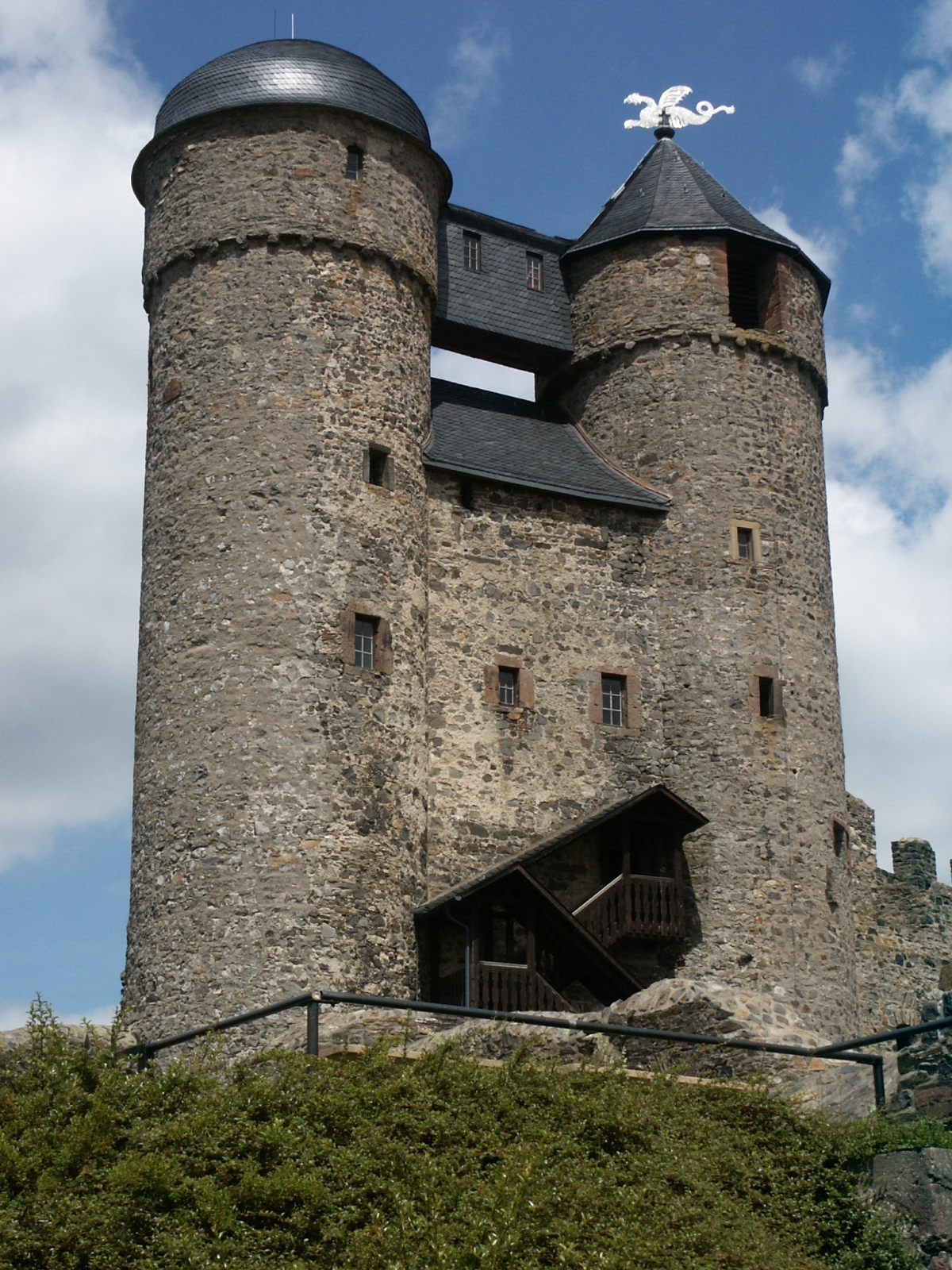
Double tower of the Greifenstein, Hesse, Germany

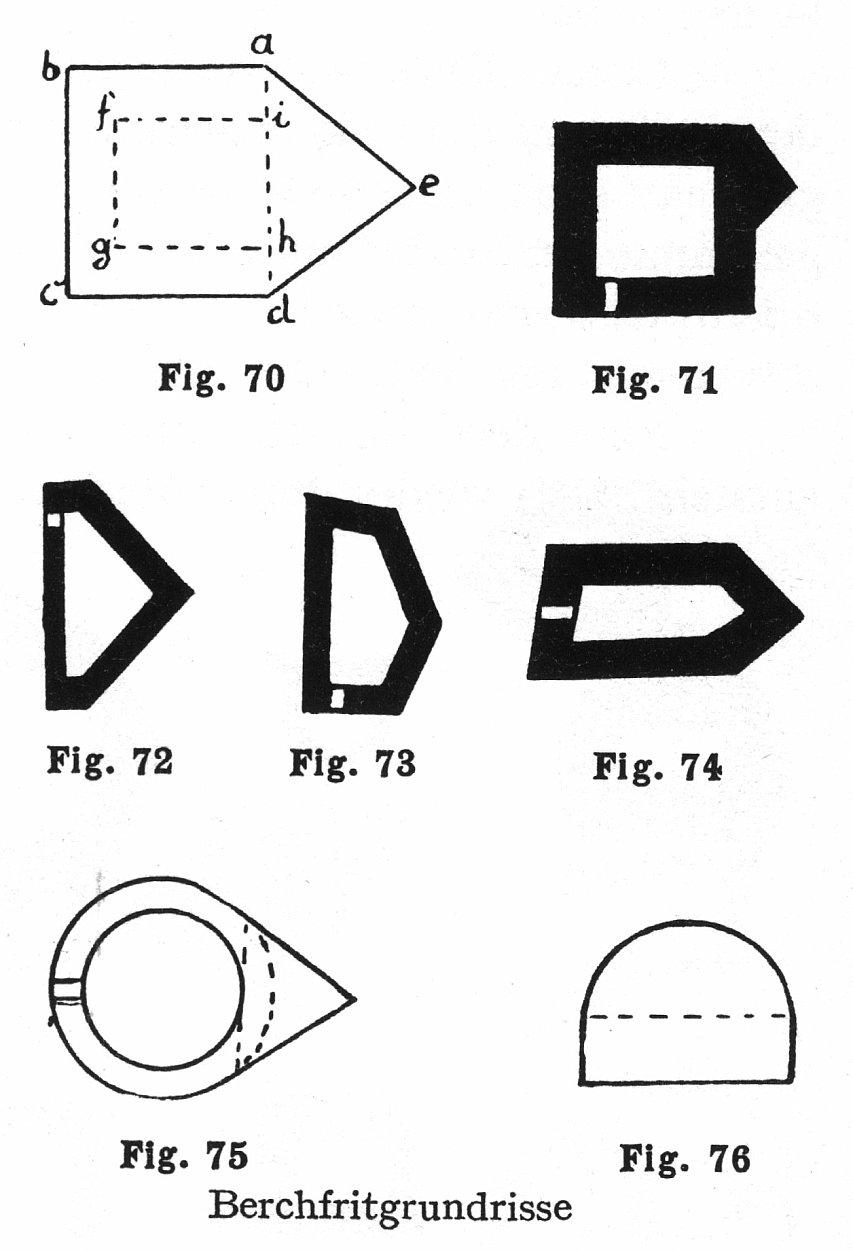
Plans of various bergfrieds with "deflection wedges"

=== Observation ===
Because the bergfried was the highest building in the castle, it usually functioned as watchtower or observation tower. From the top storey or the fighting platform the foreground and the area surrounding the castle could be observed. Watchmen (Türmer) could give early warning of an approaching enemy, raising the alarm. During sieges the raised observation post was important for observing the foreground. A particularly well-preserved example is the Osterburg in Weida: under the masonry spire of the bergfried is a watchman's residence and just under the spire is a small, original stone observation platform for the watchmen at a height of almost 58 metres above the ground.

=== Raised fighting platform ===
An enemy attacking a spur castle or hillside castle could often position himself above the castle itself. The height of the bergfried could at least in some cases compensate for that. From the elevated fighting platform, the hillside could be better controlled than from the fighting positions lower down. The bergfried usually also served generally as a fortified tower. Examples of very high bergfrieds were or are those at Rheinfels Castle (54 m) and the Osterburg (53 m). Additional chemins de ronde (walkways behind the battlements) could be built on the lower storeys of a tower (e.g. Bischofstein Castle on the Moselle).

=== Stronghold and prison ===
The solid construction and inaccessible elevated entrance of the bergfried made it a relatively safe repository within the castle. Here valuables could be stored, so that the tower took over the role of a stronghold.

By the Early Modern Period at least, bergfrieds were being used as largely escape-proof places of custody for prisoners. In particular, the shaft-like cellars in the base of the tower were often used as a form of dungeon called an oubliette, which was only accessible through a narrow opening in the ceiling. However this form of cellar was not necessarily intended for such use but was a result of the overall engineering design of the bergfried. The thick walls used in the base only left a narrow, about 4-8 metre high, internal space that was usually covered by a stabilizing vault and was only accessible through a hatch at its apex. This design was also a result of the fact that the elevated entrance of the tower was located on an upper floor. Access to the oubliette through the hole (an angstloch or "fear hole") was almost always by means of a ladder or rope winch. Wall steps, like those found in the old bergfried of Langenau Castle, are a rare exception.

The cellar in the tower base was used in different ways. In some instances, it was used as a warehouse or magazine, so sometimes piles of round stones were kept here for use as projectiles during a siege. In a few cases, it was used as a cistern, but often the room remained unused. The blanket assumption in older literature and often also in tourism that the cellar space was used as the dungeon is thus misleading.

Most reports of the incarceration of prisoners in the basement of a bergfried date to the late Middle Ages and early modern period; to what extent this was common before then, is uncertain. Often it is probably a later change of use, as was the case in many town wall towers and even entire castle complexes, like the Bastille, are known. When prisoners were incarcerated in the often claustrophobic, poorly ventilated and dimly lit or even completely dark basements, it was not just imprisonment, but corporal punishment, a severe psychological and physical mistreatment of prisoners.

=== Status symbol ===
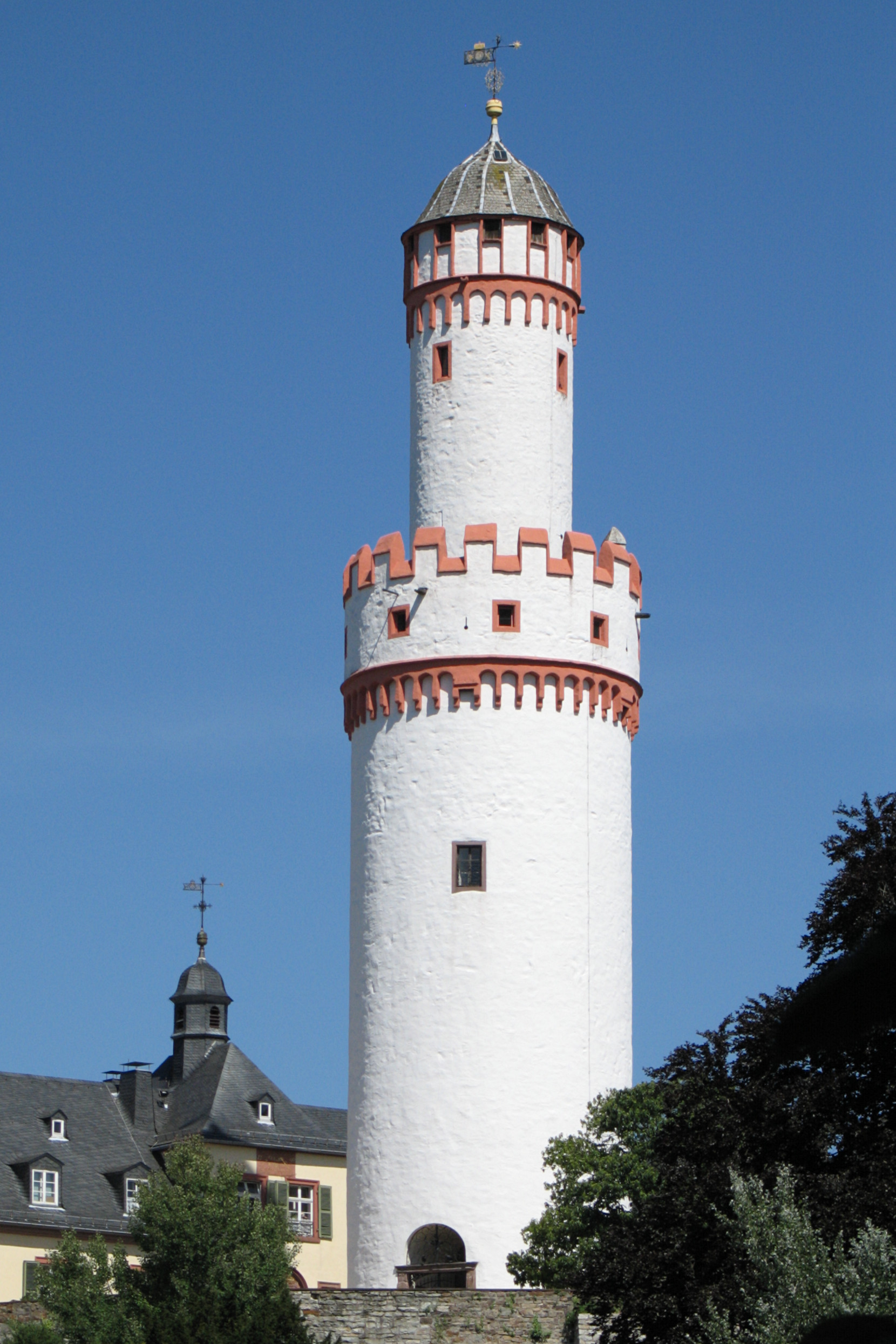
The 48-metre-high "White Tower" at Bad Homburg Palace was retained even when the castle was later converted into a schloss

Just as the former tower houses of the nobility and other types of tower, the bergfried assumed a significant representational function. Some castle researchers emphasize its role as a status symbol, although it cannot be proved from medieval sources that symbolism was actually intended or indeed perceived by those living at the time. The symbolism of a tower has many meanings, not all of them positive, for example, the Tower of Babel represented man's pride and self-indulgence. Because, from the Middle Ages, secular rulers and especially the knight (who considered himself as a 'militia christiana') often had a Christian faith, researchers have suggested that the bergfried may have a Christian connotation as a symbol of Mary. Mary was referred to in the Litany of the Blessed Virgin Mary as an "ivory tower" and "Tower of David". But in the case of castle towers, this symbolism has not been sufficiently established by the sources.

In contemporary descriptions of a castle, the main tower is often cited as the first; as a pictorial abbreviation or visual shortcut it is often seen on coats of arms and seals, where it symbolizes the castle as a whole. The bergfried in its status symbolism is perhaps comparable to medieval family towers in some northern Italian and German cities, whose sometimes bizarre heights cannot be explained in military terms. In addition, there were, for example, in Regensburg, no armed conflicts between the urban patrician families, so that here the status function was dominant from the beginning. A possible example of the use of these towers as a status symbol, are the so-called butter-churn towers whereby a small tower or turret was built on top of the original tower, bringing no additional military benefit, but increasing its height for better observation.

During the transition from the late Middle Ages to modern times when, as a result of the development of firearms, a revolution in military technology took place, the bergfried gradually lost its military function, as any high buildings were particularly vulnerable to cannon fire and explosives. In response to these developments, castles were converted into fortresses of a new type, the bergfried being often thereby demolished or dismantled, as for example at Coburg Fortress or Wildenstein.

The bergfried survived until modern times, however, in some castles, where the defensive function was increasingly forgone and the castle was instead converted into a stately home or palace, typically called a schloss. Often, the bergfried here the only element here largely retained in its original form from the old medieval castle, which in turn can be regarded as evidence of its role as the (now traditional) symbol of power. Examples include the palace at Bad Homburg (where the bergfried is known as the White Tower) or Wildeck Castle (where the tower is known as Dicker Heinrich - "Fat Henry") at Zschopau. When Johannisburg Castle in Aschaffenburg, the last big Renaissance palace built before the outbreak of the Thirty Years' War, the Gothic bergfried of the previous castle was integrated in the otherwise very regular layout, although it breaks the symmetry in a conspicuous manner.

During the schloss building of the Renaissance era (and to a lesser extent the Baroque too) towers again played an important role as elements of a stately home, even if they now mostly had no longer any defensive function (Moritzburg, Meßkirch Castle).

=== Refuge ===
More recent castle research, especially the group around the Bavarian medieval archaeologist Joachim Zeune, has placed in doubt the function of the bergfried as a refuge in case of siege. They suggest that a retreat into the tower was "death by stages" and was most useful if a relief army was expected. In support of this thesis, the general lack of appropriate findings and traditions is cited. The elevated entrance, too, is suggested as having more of a symbolic and psychological importance.

Critics reject this theory (which emerged as part of Zeune's broader "symbol of power" theory) as having a complete disregard for high medieval feudal order and its system of fealty. It would simply transfer Günther Bandmann's methodology to secular architecture.

Many castles were feudal estates that were owned by a powerful feudal lord or prince-bishopric. Princely territories at that time were protected by a dense network of small and medium-sized fortifications, which was supplemented by the fortified estates of sub-vassals. From this perspective, in the event of attack the defenders could rely entirely on the support of their lords his subordinated or allied knighthood. Conversely, the ruler would of course rely upon the support of his vassals in times of battle.

The basements of bergfrieds were often embedded several metres into the ground. Undermining was therefore not a great threat. Arson was also very difficult due to their stone construction and the few light openings could be quickly closed to prevent being smoked out. The conservative historian therefore sees the bergfried as a means of passive defence, as a refuge for a few days until relief arrived. For this reason, very few facilities for active defence can be found in these buildings. The main aim was to prevent an attacker breaking in. To storm such a tower within a few days is almost impossible. Thanks to their solid construction many bergfrieds even escaped later demolition attempts by the surrounding rural population, who wanted to carry off building materials from abandoned castles and reuse them.

An attack on such a fortified site within an active feudal system was almost hopeless. It was far less risky simply to plunder the farms and mills of the enemy. In fact, a large number of Central European castles were never seriously attacked during the Middle Ages. Consequently, there is not much evidence of a retreat into a bergfried; the building had already fulfilled its deterrent function.

A siege was only worth undertaking if the attacker had previously ensured he had legal authority and had asked the state sovereign or even the emperor for permission. This was only possible where there had been actual or fabricated violations of the law, such as highway robbery, forgery or murder. The hands of those who had sworn allegiance to the sovereign were then tied; for legal reasons they could not come to the aid of the attacked lord. In such cases, taking final refuge in the main tower was almost pointless.

The bergfrieds of 12th and 13th century castles were originally surrounded only by simple defensive walls. Flanking towers and zwingers were added in later phases. Many outbuildings were then made of wood or were half-timbered, and stone housing was usually not fortified. In the Middle Ages in the event of a siege, a massive bergfried was undoubtedly the safest building in which women, the elderly and children could seek refuge during the fighting.

Such a tower was an effective protection against surprise attacks by smaller marauding gangs and the local population. Often a castle was vulnerable just through the absence of a few able-bodied men whilst they were out hunting or working in the fields. Even without supplies the remaining castle residents could hold out in the bergfried until the return of their menfolk and were protected from abuse and rape. The safe refuge of the bergfried was welcome at a time when state and social structures were just beginning to take shape.

During later expansions additional towers were often designed as shell towers. Their rear sides were open so as to offer an invading enemy no cover. Such semi-circular or rectangular towers have survived at countless castles and fortifications. They are a further indication that a castle would not be given up even after the enceinte had been breached.

The largest main tower of a medieval European castle, the mighty donjon of the French Château de Coucy, was still viewed as a threat during the First World War. The German High Command had the roughly 50-metre-high tower blown up on 27 March 1917 in order to cut off the line of retreat for French troops, in spite of widespread international protests.

In the late and post medieval period emerged new castles emerged whose main towers were certainly never intended as refuges. For example, in 1418 Frederick of Freyberg had one of the last great new castles of the German Middle Ages built next to his ancestral castle of Eisenberg in the Allgäu. Hohenfreyberg was created in the style of a Hohenstaufen hill castle, so it could not be without a bergfried. Today, the two castle ruins are one of the most important castle groups in Central Europe. The Freybergers probably wanted to create a symbol chivalrous self-consciousness again at the end of the Middle Ages.

In the 16th century the Augsburg family of Fugger acquired the Marienburg in Niederalfingen in the present-day county of Ostalb in the German state of Baden-Württemberg. In the time of the High Renaissance a "high medieval" hill castle with a mighty main tower was built out of rusticated ashlar here. The Fugger family, who had come from a humble background, appear to have wanted to legitimize their newly acquired nobility here with an "ancient" family castle.

==== In time of siege ====
Attacks on medieval castles in Central Europe were not usually carried out by large siege armies. Often just twenty to a hundred men blocked the entrances to the castle and demoralized its occupants with occasional attacks. Animal carcasses or debris might be thrown into the courtyard. A blockaded castle actually only needed to be starved out, nevertheless supplies were also a problem for the besieging force. Farmers in the area would hide their grain in erdstalls and drive their cattle into the forest.

The retinue of a besieged castle usually consisted of only a few able-bodied men. If the siege was foreseen, the castle's peacetime complement of three to twenty men could be doubled or tripled. And in an emergency, at least the higher ranks could take refuge in the main tower. A castle was only regarded as conquered when the bergfried had fallen. This could take some weeks. During this time the attacker had to continue to feed and pay his men. Sometimes, therefore, the mercenaries of the besieger just ran away or even turned against their commander, if they had to wait too long for success.

Even legal settlements between the two opposing lords are recorded; they often knew one other personally and occupied the same social position. They might negotiate a deadline, which apparently was usually around 30 days. If the lord or the allies of the besieged did not appear within this period before the castle, the defenders surrendered the fort without a fight. In return, they received safe conduct and were sometimes allowed to take their household with them too. Such a treaty could save life and avoid unnecessary costs on both sides. However it would certainly require some ability to defend the castle and main tower. To "fight to the end" could be very risky. For example, in 1224, the higher ranks of the defenders of Bedford Castle in England were hanged in front of the castle after the main tower had been demolished by troops of King Henry III. In Central Europe during the German Peasants' War castles were surrendered after an assurance of safe passage had been given.

=== Fortified barns and fortress churches ===
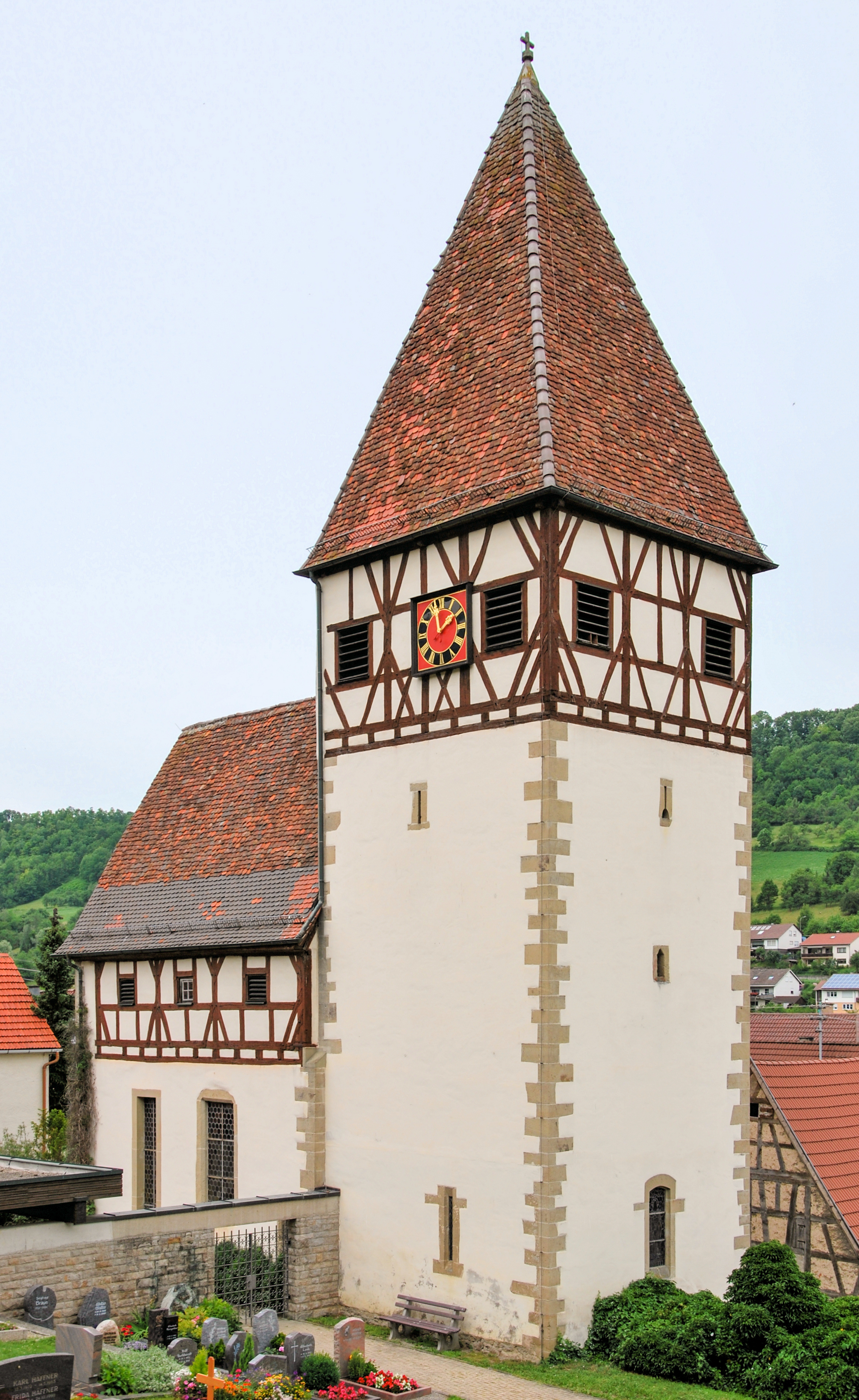
Fortified church of St. Alban & St. Wendelin in Morsbach, Germany

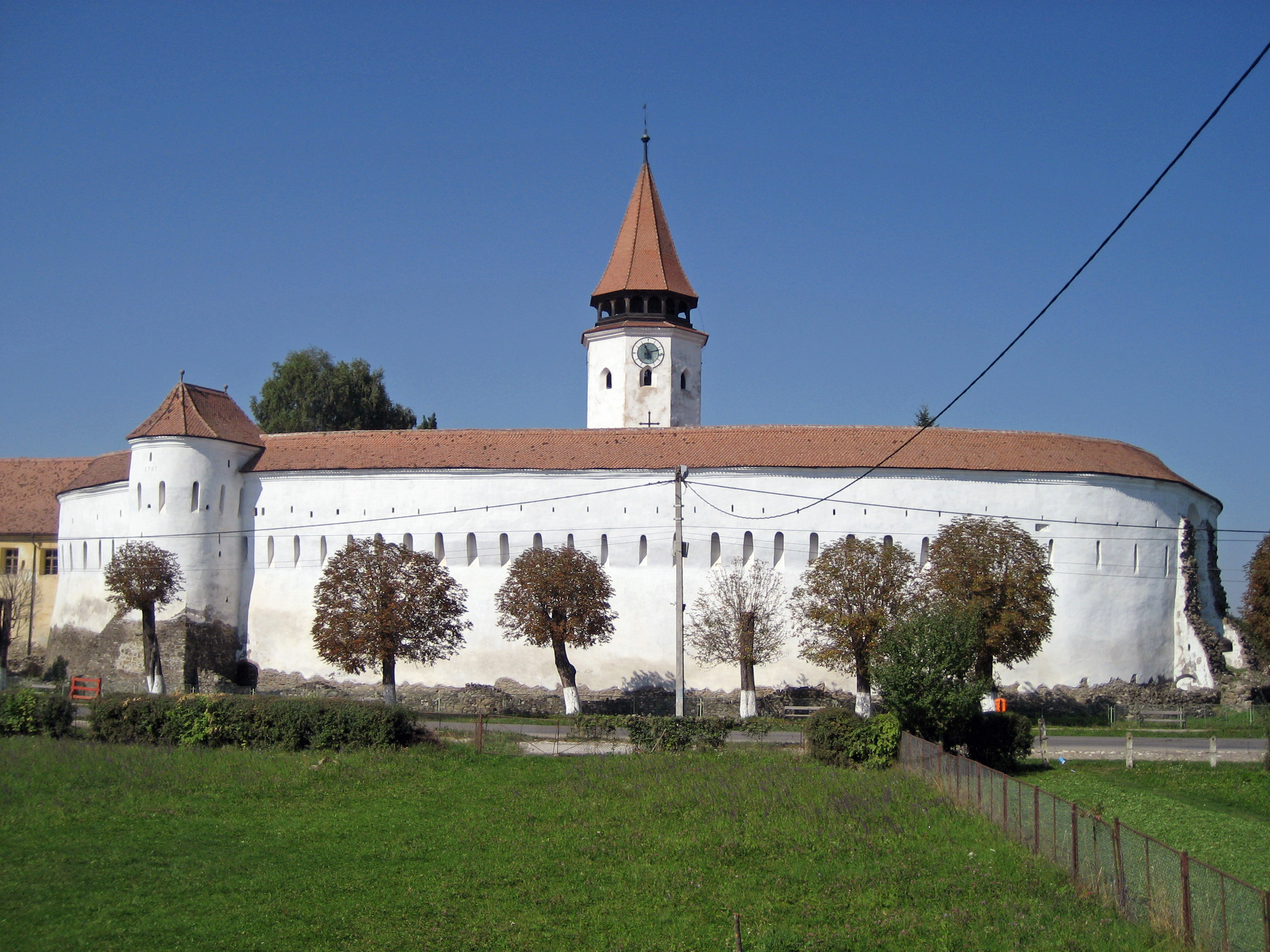
Fortress church in Prejmer, Transylvania

Clear parallels to the bergfried's function as a refuge were the fortified storage barns on the lightly fortified farms of the lesser nobility as well as the stone church spires of villages and fortified churches.

The ordinary population suffered most in the event of war, so almost every large village was lightly fortified. Not infrequently, the village church was developed into a fortified church or even a fortress church. The massive church tower - or in the special case of the round church the entire building - assumed the function of a bergfried in which the population could shelter if necessary for a short period. Often the attacker withdrew again after a short while, so active defence was secondary.

That the "time saving" factor was ignored in Joachim Zeune's argument was picked up by researcher, Hans Jürgen Hessel, in an essay on fortified churches in Festungsjournal 32 by the German Society for Fortress Research (2008).

The estates of the gentry and large farmers often had smaller fortified barns that were mostly on islands in lakes. A projecting upper storey, capable of providing a refuge, was supported on a solid lower storey. Most examples of such fortified storage towers have been preserved in Westphalia in Germany. Joachim Zeune provided one of the few pieces of confirmed evidence of such a "miniature bergfried" in Franconia at Dürrnhof.

== Sources ==
- Biller, Thomas (1993). Die Adelsburg in Deutschland. Entstehung, Form und Bedeutung. Munich.
- Folda, Jaroslav (2005). Crusader Art in the Holy Land, From the Third Crusade to the Fall of Acre., Cambridge University Press, 2005.
- Friar, Stephen (2003). The Sutton Companion to Castles, Sutton Publishing, Stroud, 2003. ISBN 978-0-7509-3994-2
- German Castles Association (GCA) (1999) Burgen in Mitteleuropa, Stuttgart.
- Kennedy, Hugh (2000). Crusader Castles. Cambridge University Press. ISBN 0-521-79913-9.
- Pehla, Hans-Klaus (1974). Wehrturm und Bergfried im Mittelalter. Aachen.
- Piper, Otto (1900). Abriss der Burgenkunde, Leipzig, G. J. Göschen, 1900.
- Thompson, M.W. (2008). The Rise of the Castle, Cambridge University Press 2008. ISBN 0-521-08853-4
