= Langenau Castle =

German castle

Coordinates: 50°18′38.1″N 7°50′34″E

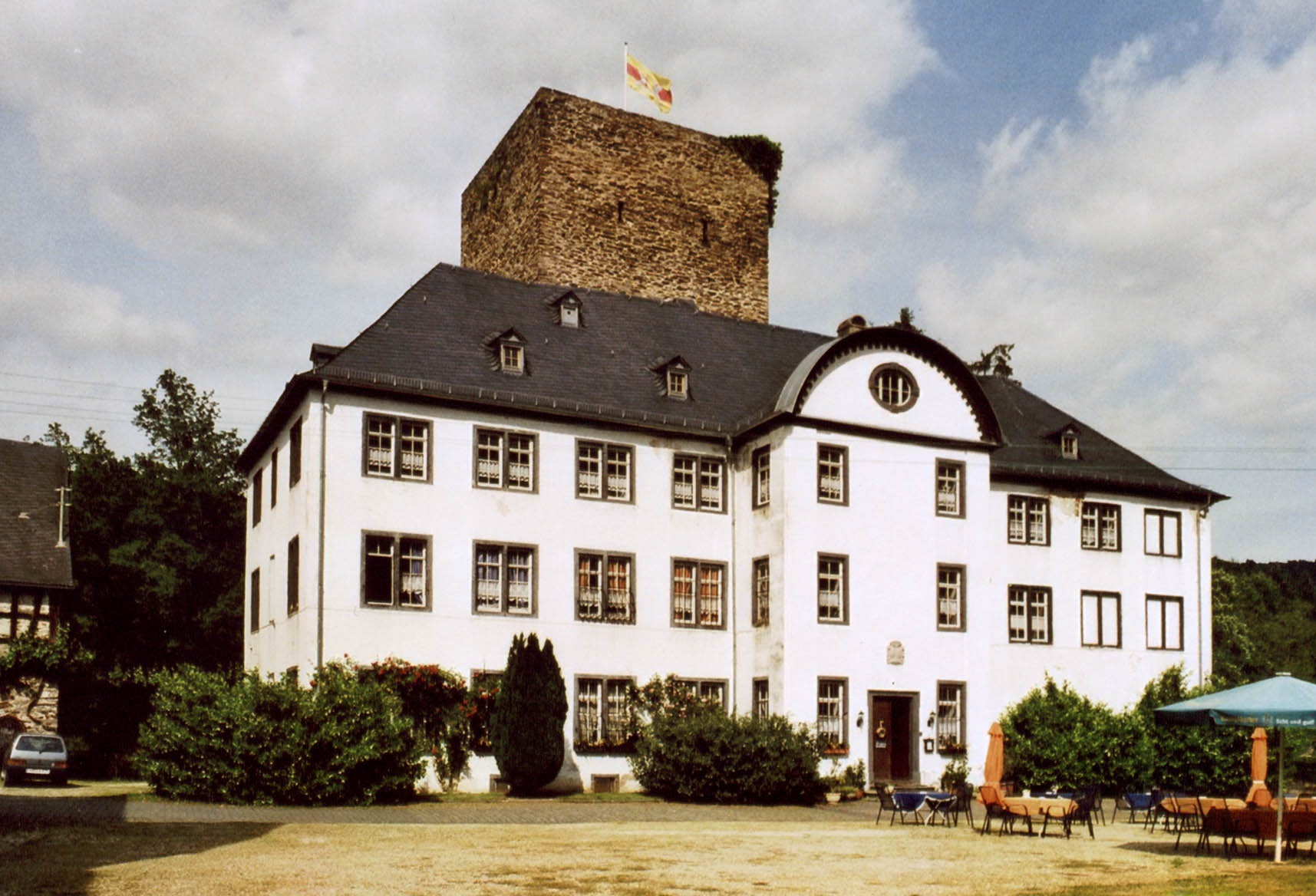
The castle in 2009

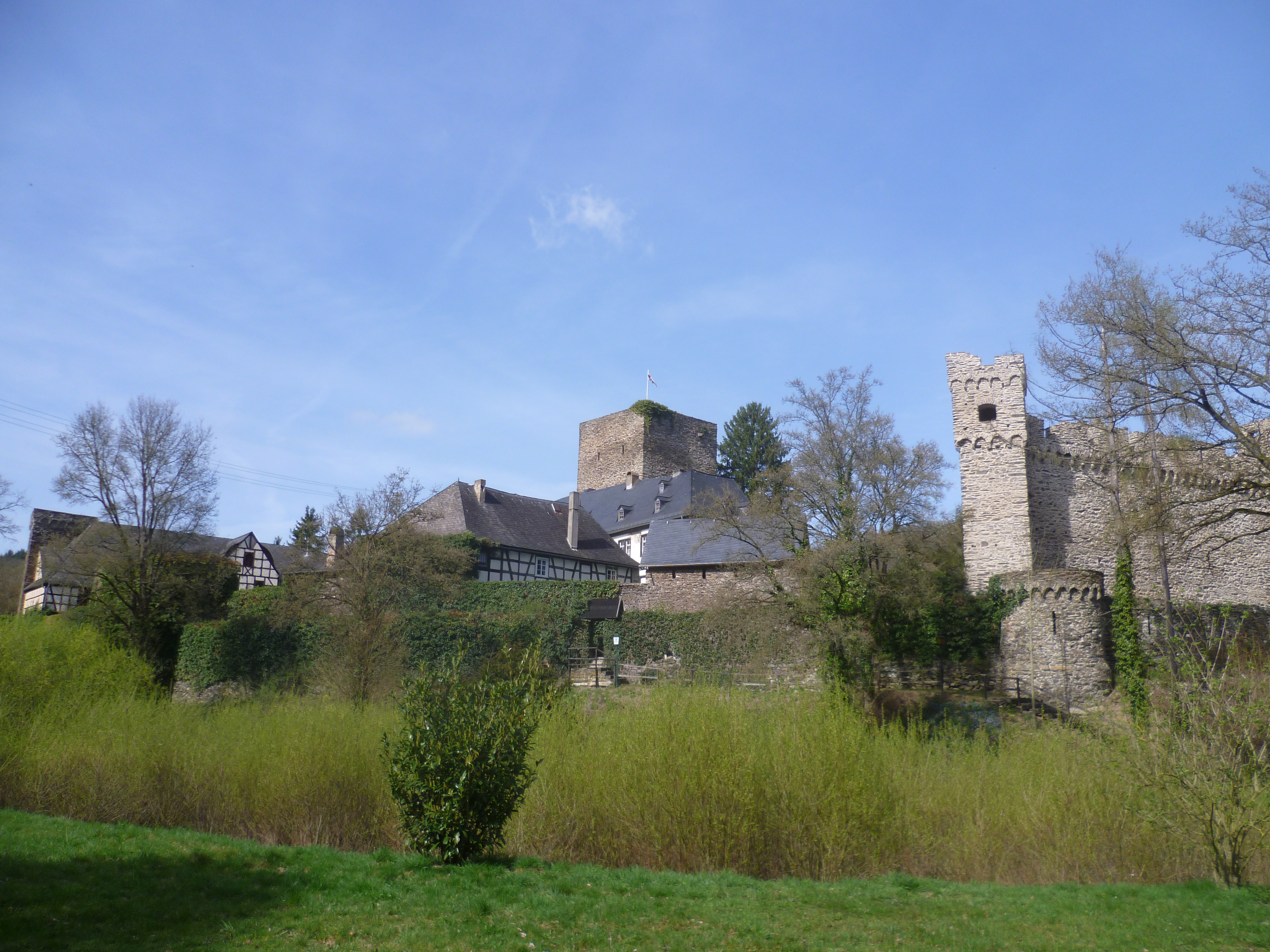
Exterior view of the castle

Langenau Castle (German: Schloss Langenau) is an old lowland castle in the municipality of Obernhof in the county of Rhein-Lahn-Kreis in the German state of Rhineland-Palatinate.

The site of the fortification was the confluence of the Gelbach and the Lahn rivers. As a result, the castle is designed as a lowland type, which is unusual for this region.

In 1243 the castle was first mentioned in the will of Countess Mechthild of Sayn who left it to the Archbishopric of Cologne. The archbishop enfeoffed the fortress shortly thereafter to the noble family of Langenau, cousins of the counts of Laurenburg and thus of the House of Nassau. The family kept the castle as a joint inheritance or Ganerbschaft for centuries.

The original fortress was turned into a water castle on the construction of a dyke. Today, of the 13th century fortification, only the square Romanesque style bergfried is left. The remaining fortifications, an enceinte and an eight-metre-high shield wall with two flanking towers, show elements of Gothic architecture and appeared in the 14th or 15th centuries. Presumably by the middle of the 14th century, when the Langenaus built New Langenau Castle as their main residence, the castle no longer served as a noble seat, but primarily as a base from which to manage the estate.

In 1613 the Langenau family died out. The castle changed ownership several times in the years that followed. In the 17th century, a large timber-framed domestic building was built. In 1696 the mercantile and industrialist family of Marioth purchased the site as their residence and had it converted into a schloss in 1698.

In 1847, Countess Giech, a daughter of Prussian reform minister, vom und zum Stein, became the new occupant. She had the schloss converted in 1851 into a hospital and home for children of the poor.

== Gallery ==
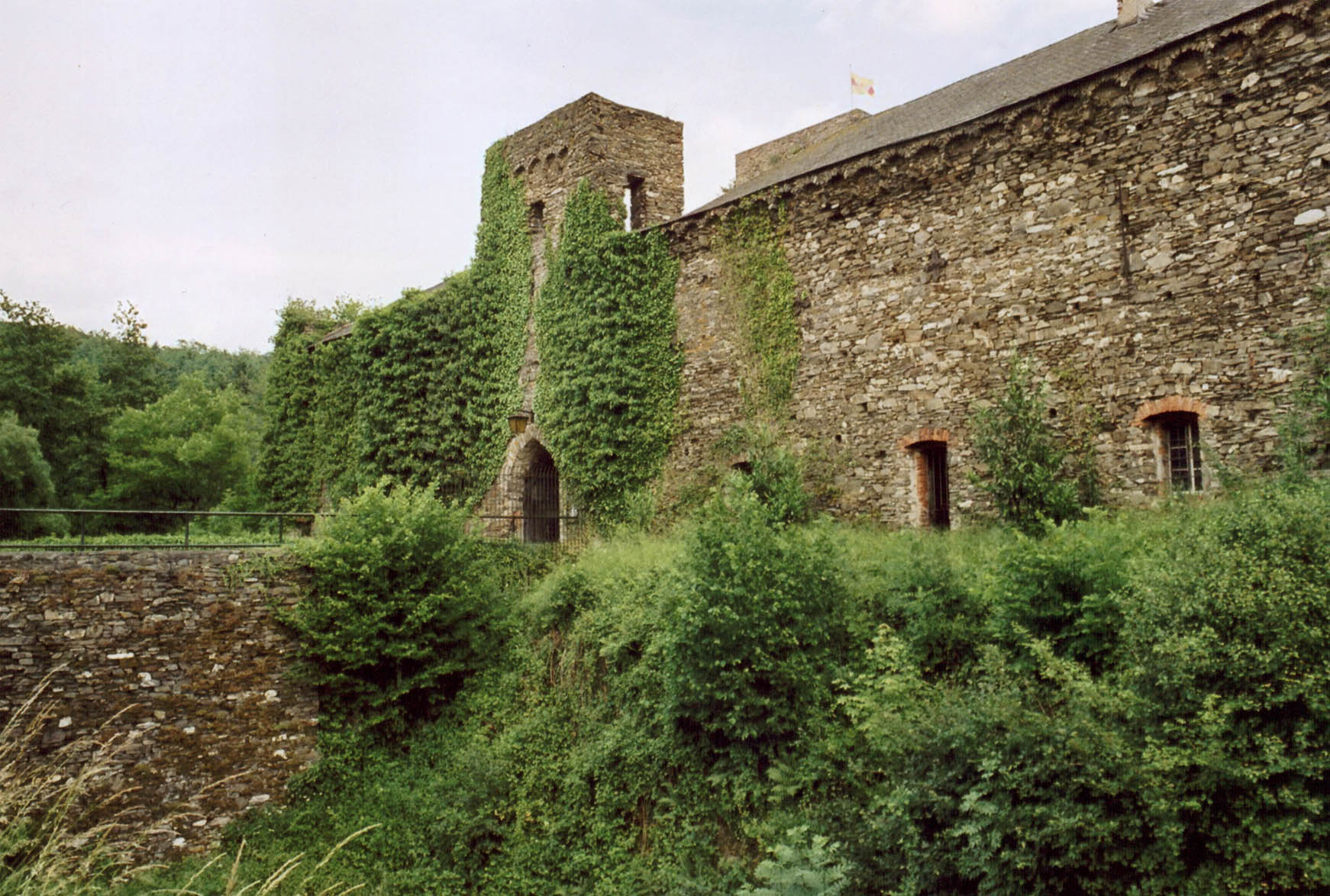
Enceinte and gate tower (2009)

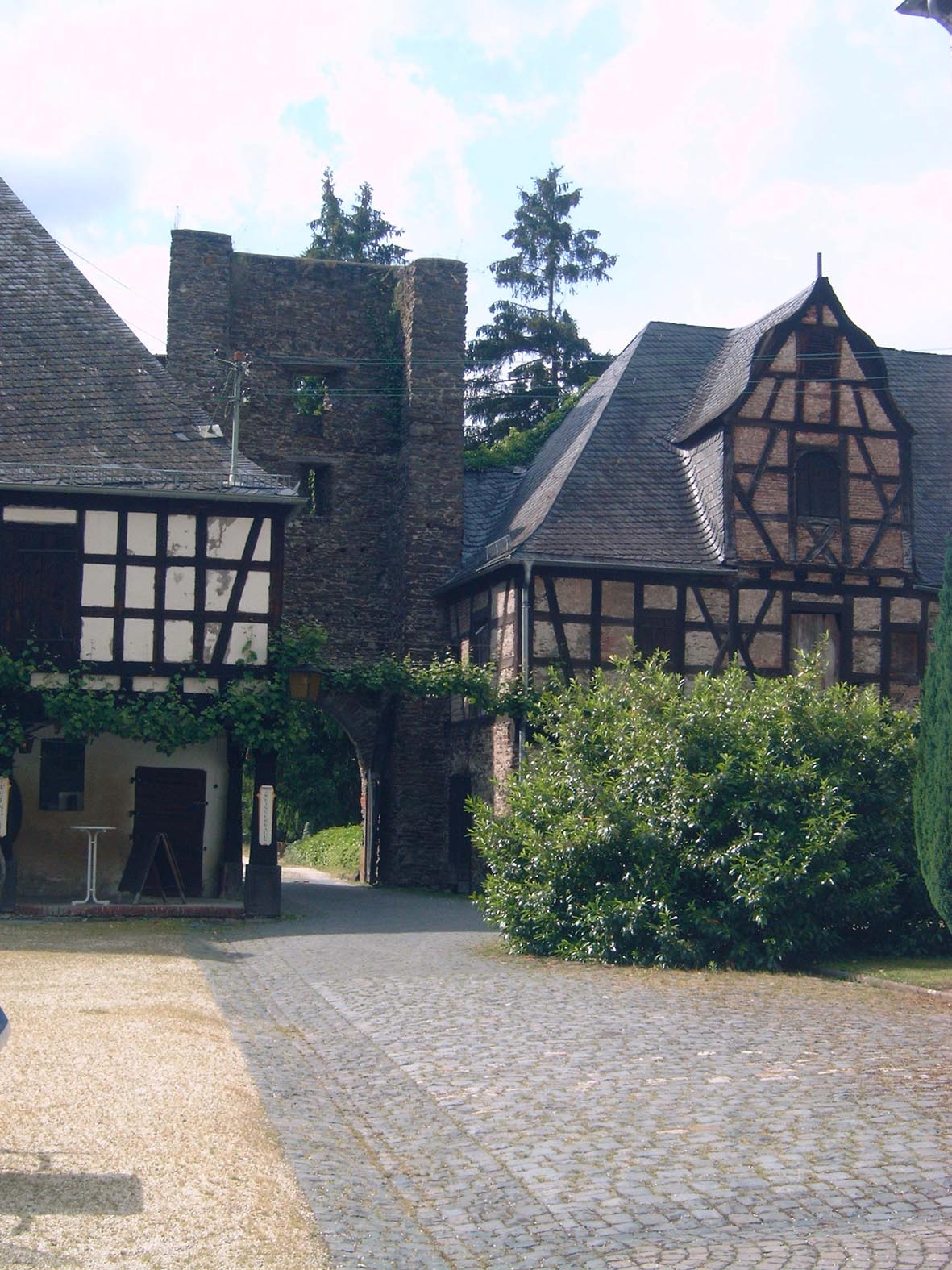
Interior of the gate tower (2009)

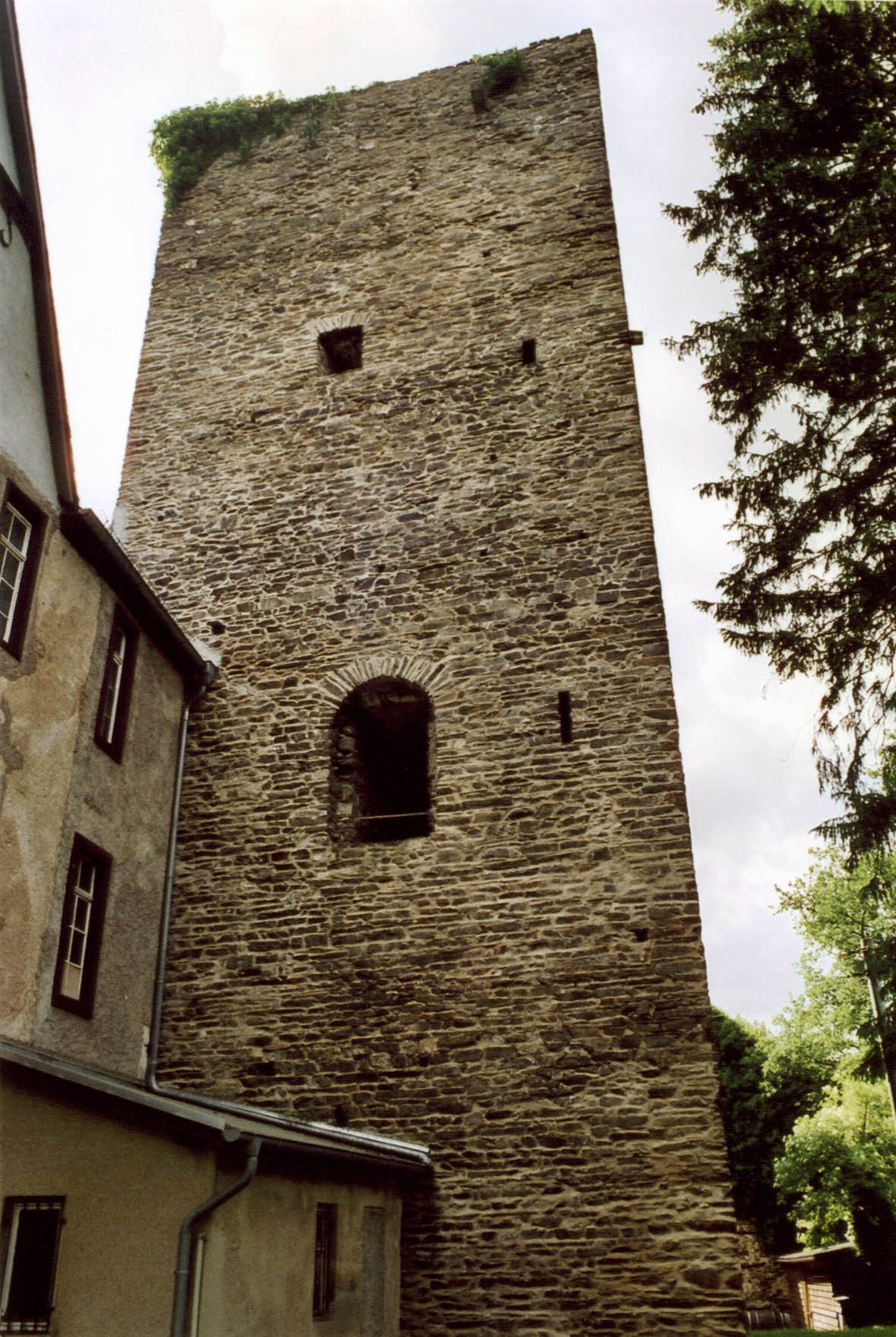
Mediaeval bergfried (2009)

== Literature ==
- Alexander Thon, Stefan Ulrich, Jens Friedhoff: „Mit starken eisernen Ketten und Riegeln beschlossen ...“. Burgen an der Lahn. Schnell & Steiner, Regensburg, 2008, ISBN 978-3-7954-2000-0, pp. 88–93.
