= Niederalfingen Castle =

Castle

- Burg Niederalfingen, Marienburg, Fuggerschloss
- Niederalfingen
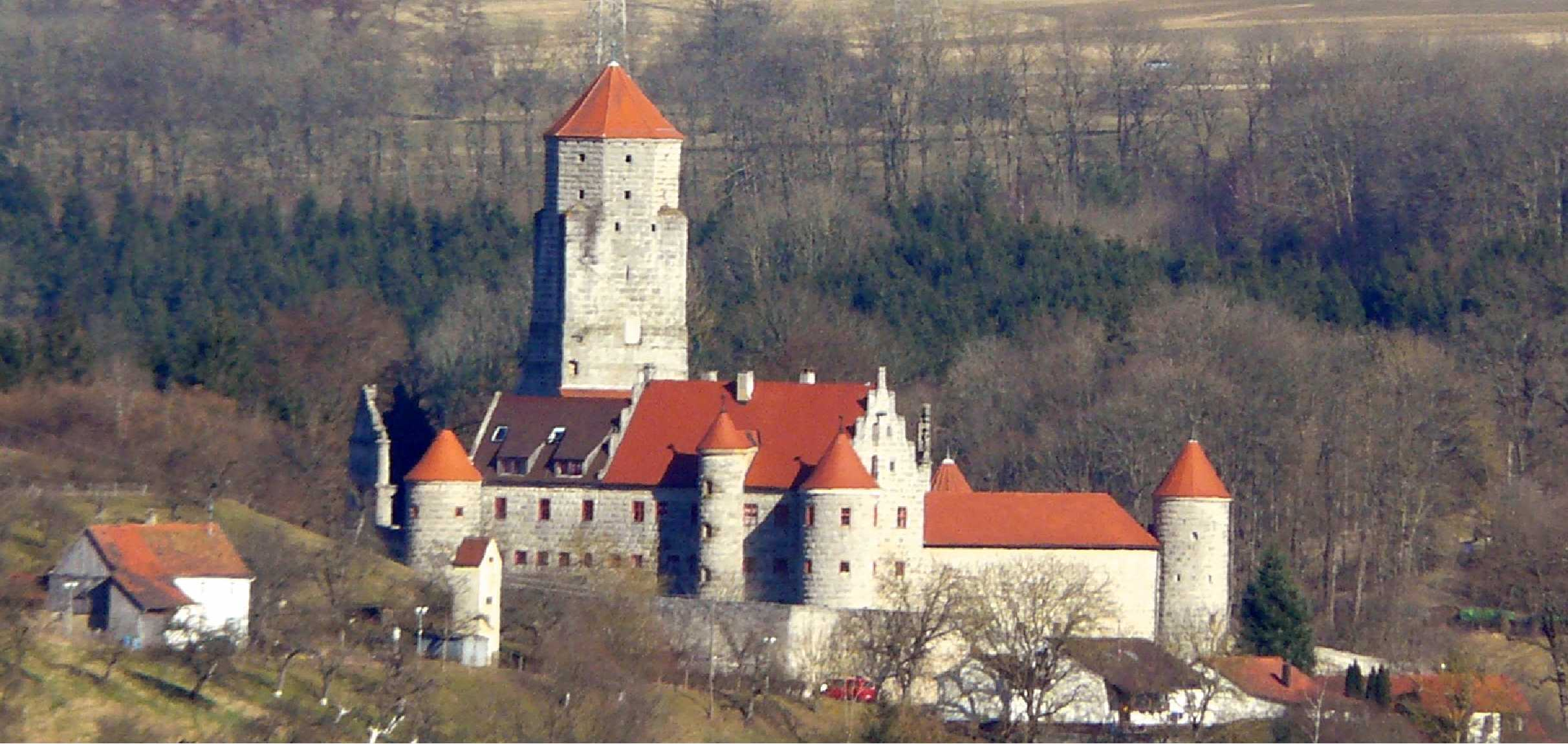
- The Marienburg seen from Aalen-Fachsenfeld

Site information
- Type: hill castle
- Code: DE-BW
- Condition: preserved

Location
- Coordinates: 48°53′48″N 10°04′36″E

Site history
- Built: around 1050
- Materials: rusticated ashlar

Garrison information
- Occupants: nobility, counts

Niederalfingen Castle (German: Burg Niederalfingen), also called the Marienburg, is a spur castle on a rocky hill spur above the Kocher valley near the village of Niederalfingen in the German state of Baden-Württemberg. It lies within the parish of Hüttlingen in the county of Ostalbkreis.

== History ==
The castle was built around 1050 as a Hohenstaufen fortification to guard the important local trade routes. After 1300, it went into the possession of the Lord of Seckendorf, in 1368 to Count Eberhard the Jarrer of Württemberg, in 1415 to the Lord of House of Hürnheim and in 1551 the now mighty castle was acquired by the Fugger family from Augsburg, by whom it was converted and expanded between 1575 and 1577.

In 1838, the castle came into the ownership of the Kingdom of Württemberg. It eventually passed to the state and, since 1966, has been used as an educational and recreational facility. From 1993 to 2000 comprehensive renovations were carried out.

=== Present usage ===
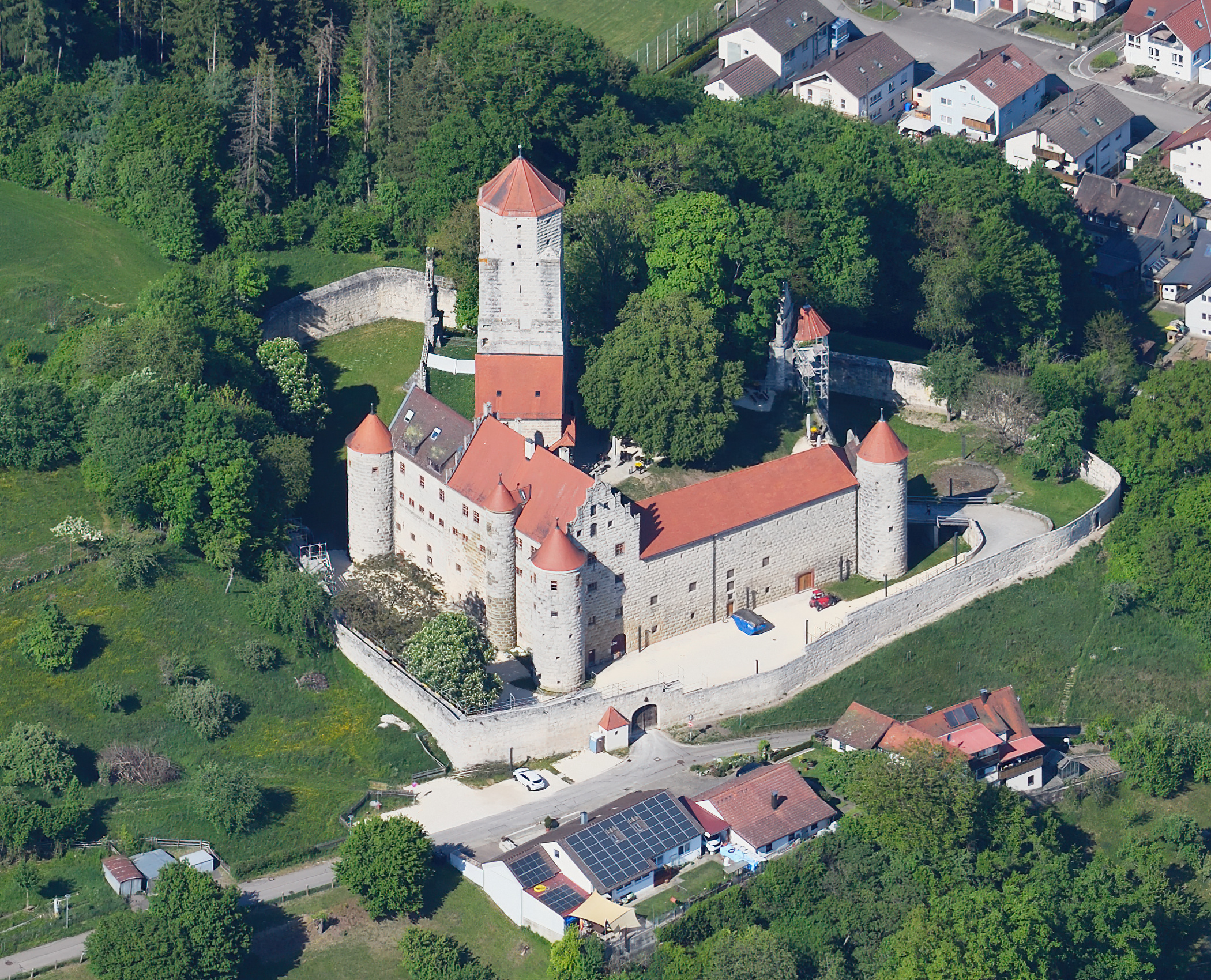
Aerial view

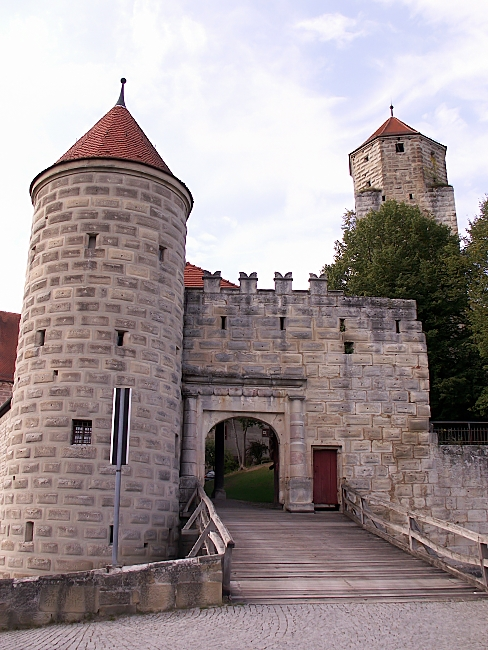
Entrance to the Marienburg

The castle is used today as a youth training centre, recreational facility and rural school hall of residence (Schullandheim). The former advocate's buildings under the castle walls now house the local history museum for the parish of Hüttlingen.

== Site ==
The site, which developed from a zwinger castle with a gateway, has an inner bailey with connecting wings, an outer bailey and substantial enceinte walls. It also has a prominent 30-metre-high bergfried, with a copper tower, an area of 9.8 × 9.8 metres and wall thickness of 3.2 metres, which is square below and hexagonal above, furnished with embrasures. The castle chapel was dedicated to St Mary, St. Barbara and St. Catharine. The feudal castle is and example of the Romanticism of the 16th century.

== Literature ==
- Katholische Studierende Jugend Wernau: Burgkurier. Eigenverlag. Wernau
- Max Miller, Gerhard Taddey: Handbuch der historischen Stätten Deutschlands. Band 6. Baden-Württemberg. Alfred Kröner Verlag, Stuttgart, 1965
- Friedrich Wilhelm Krahe: Burgen des Deutschen Mittelalters. Würzburg, 2000
