= Fighting platform =

Uppermost defensive platform of an ancient or medieval gateway, tower

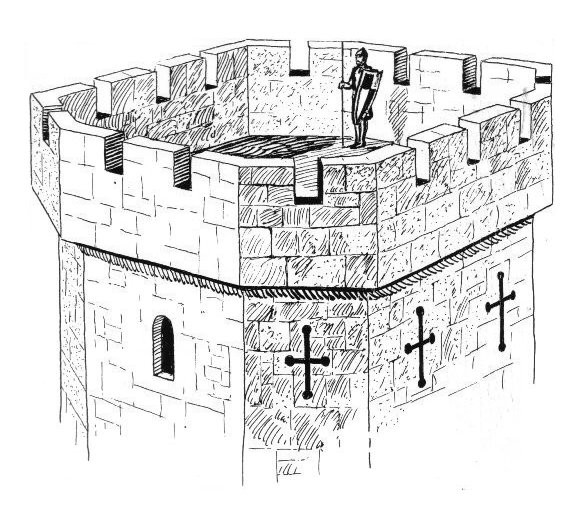
Fighting platform on a tower

A fighting platform or terrace is the uppermost defensive platform of an ancient or medieval gateway, tower (such as the fighting platform on a bergfried) and breteche. The fighting platform is surrounded by a parapet, usually a battlement.

Whilst in warmer climates (for example in the Mediterranean region) the platforms were usually open, in Central Europe they were frequently covered by a roof structure (on towers by a spire or tented roof).
