= List of universities of applied sciences in Germany =

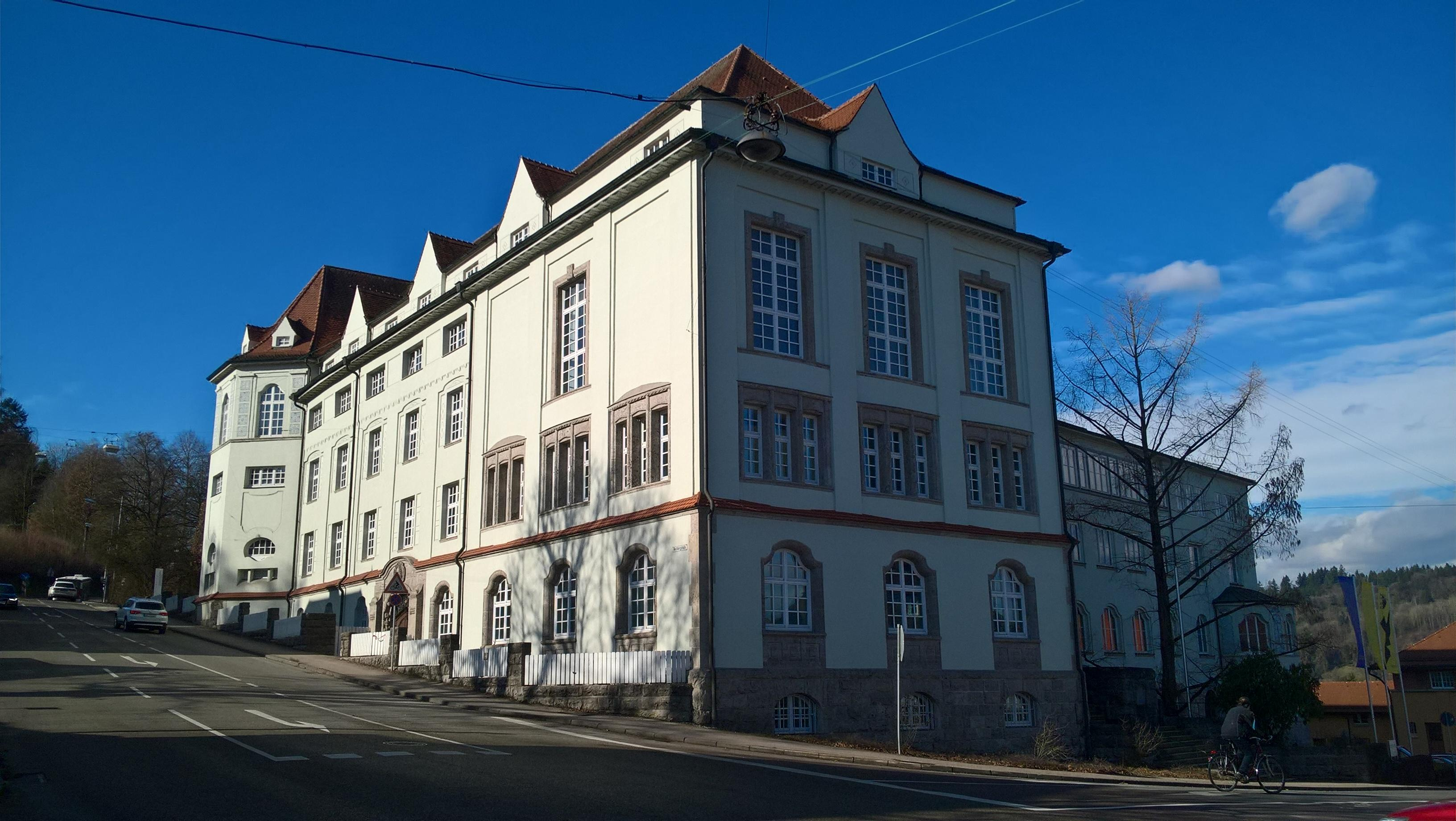
The University of Applied Design Schwäbisch Gmünd (founded in 1776), one of the oldest universities of applied sciences in Germany

This is a list of the universities of applied sciences (Fachhochschulen) in Germany. The list also includes Technische Hochschulen (technical university of applied sciences), which focus on engineering and the natural sciences rather than covering the whole spectrum of academic disciplines, but does not include German research universities who have the right to award doctorates (Universitäten), universities of public administration (Verwaltungsfachhochschulen), universities of art (Kunsthochschulen), theological universities (Theologische Hochschulen), and universities of education (Pädagogische Hochschulen).

For a list of research universities, see List of universities in Germany.

University	Location	State	Type	Founding date	Number of students	Note
BSP Business and Law School	Berlin Steglitz-Zehlendorf, Hamburg Mitte	Berlin, Hamburg	private	2009	1944	
CBS International Business School	Cologne, Brühl, Neuss, Mainz	North Rhine-Westphalia, Rhineland-Palatinate	private	1993	2735	
DHGS University for Health and Sport (Deutsche Hochschule für Gesundheit und Sport)	Berlin, Ismaning, Unna, Frankfurt, Mannheim, Stuttgart, Hamburg, Cologne, Leipzig	Berlin, Bavaria, North Rhine-Westphalia, Hesse, Baden-Württemberg, Hamburg, Saxony	private	2007	8397	further campuses in Innsbruck and Vienna (Austria)
FHM Online University (Fachhochschule des Mittelstandes)	Bamberg, Berlin, Hanover, Rostock, Schwerin, Bielefeld, Cologne, Frechen	Berlin, Bavaria, Lower Saxony, Mecklenburg-Vorpommern, North Rhine-Westphalia	private	2000	5497	
FOM University of Applied Sciences	Essen, Berlin, Munich	North Rhine-Westphalia, Berlin, Bavaria	private	1993	45611	
Fresenius University of Applied Sciences	Idstein,Heidelberg, Berlin, Hamburg, Frankfurt, Wiesbaden, Cologne, Düsseldorf, Munich	Baden-Württemberg, Berlin, Hamburg, Hesse, North Rhine-Westphalia, Bavaria	private	1848	16169	further campuses in New York City and Vienna
Macromedia University of Applied Sciences	Potsdam, Berlin, Frankfurt, Hamburg, Cologne, Leipzig, Munich, Stuttgart, Freiburg	Brandenburg, Berlin, Hesse, Hamburg, North Rhine-Westphalia, Saxony, Bavaria, Baden-Württemberg	private	2006	5687	
HSD University of Applied Sciences (Hochschule Döpfer)	Cologne, Potsdam, Regensburg	North Rhine-Westphalia, Brandenburg, Bavaria	private	2013	1550	
IB University of Applied Health and Social Sciences (IB Hochschule für Gesundheit und Soziales)	Berlin, Hamburg, Cologne, Munich, Stuttgart	Berlin, Hamburg, North Rhine-Westphalia, Bavaria, Baden-Württemberg	private	2007	482	
International School of Management	Dortmund, Berlin, Cologne, Frankfurt, Hamburg, Stuttgart, Munich	North Rhine-Westphalia, Berlin, Hesse, Hamburg, Baden-Württemberg, Bavaria	private	1990	3779	
IU International University of Applied Sciences	Erfurt, Bad Honnef, Dortmund, Düsseldorf, Essen, Cologne, Münster, Berlin, Bremen, Frankfurt, Freiburg, Mannheim, Stuttgart, Hamburg, Hanover, Leipzig, Dresden, Lübeck, Mainz, Munich, Augsburg, Nuremberg	North Rhine-Westphalia, Berlin, Bremen, Thuringia, Hesse, Baden-Württemberg, Hamburg, Lower Saxony, Saxony, Baden-Württemberg, Bavaria	private	1998	124345	
Media University of Applied Sciences	Berlin, Frankfurt, Cologne	Berlin, Hesse, North Rhine-Westphalia	private	2008	1783	
Mediadesign University of Applied Sciences	Berlin, Düsseldorf, Munich	Berlin, North Rhine-Westphalia, Bavaria	private	2004	693	
SRH University of Applied Sciences	Heidelberg, Riedlingen, Berlin, Dresden, Fürth, Gera, Hamburg, Hamm, Leverkusen	Baden-Württemberg, North Rhine-Westphalia, Berlin, Saxony, Bavaria, Thuringia, Hamburg	private	1969, 2024	18327	
University of Europe for Applied Sciences	Potsdam, Berlin, Hamburg, Iserlohn	Brandenburg, Berlin, Hamburg, North Rhine-Westphalia	private	2000	6251	
Victoria International University	Berlin, Baden-Baden	Berlin, Baden-Württemberg	private	2011	441	
Accadis University of Applied Sciences	Bad Homburg	Hesse	private	1990	569	
AKAD University	Stuttgart	Baden-Württemberg	private	1959	6634	distance university
Akkon University of Applied Sciences for Human Sciences	Berlin	Berlin	private	2009	1471	affiliated with the St John Accident Assistance (Johanniter Orden)
Alice Salomon University of Applied Sciences	Berlin	Berlin	public	1908	4248	
Allensbach University of Applied Sciences	Konstanz	Baden-Württemberg	private	1996, 2005	625	
Apollon University of Health Economics	Bremen	Bremen	private	2005	5161	
bbw University of Applied Sciences	Berlin	Berlin	private	2007	691	
Berlin International University of Applied Sciences	Berlin	Berlin	private	2014	522	
Berlin University of Applied Sciences and Technology	Berlin	Berlin	public	1823	12453	
Cooperative University of Applied Sciences Hamburg (Berufliche Hochschule Hamburg)	Hamburg	Hamburg	public	2020	524	
Brand University of Applied Sciences Hamburg	Hamburg	Hamburg	private	2010	403	
CODE University of Applied Sciences Berlin	Berlin	Berlin	private	2017	457	
CVJM University	Kassel	Hesse	private	2009	446	affiliated with the YMCA
Cooperative University of Applied Sciences Schleswig Holstein (Duale Hochschule Schleswig-Holstein)	Kiel, Lübeck, Flensburg	Schleswig-Holstein	private	1974, 2018	616	
Digital Business University	Berlin	Berlin	private	2018	289	
DIPLOMA University of Applied Sciences	Bad Sooden-Allendorf	Hesse	private	1998	6538	
Cooperative University of Applied Sciences Baden-Württemberg (Duale Hochschule Baden-Württemberg)	Heidenheim, Heilbronn, Karlsruhe, Lörrach, Mannheim, Mosbach, Bad Mergentheim, Ravensburg, Friedrichshafen, Stuttgart, Villingen-Schwenningen	Baden-Württemberg	public	2009	33676	
Gera-Eisenach University of Cooperative Education (Duale Hochschule Gera-Eisenach)	Gera, Eisenach	Thuringia	public	2016	1474	
EBZ Business School	Bochum	North Rhine-Westphalia	private	2008	1109	
Ernst Abbe University of Applied Sciences Jena	Jena	Thuringia	public	1991	4052	
Protestant University for Social & Welfare Work (Evangelische Hochschule für Soziale Arbeit & Diakonie)	Hamburg	Hamburg	ecclesiastical (protestant)	1971	749	affiliated with Rauhes Haus
Protestant University for Applied Sciences Freiburg	Freiburg	Baden-Württemberg	ecclesiastical (protestant)	1918	900	affiliated with the Evangelical Church in Baden
Lutheran University of Applied Sciences Nuremberg	Nuremberg	Bavaria	ecclesiastical (protestant)	1995	1239	affiliated with the Evangelical Lutheran Church in Bavaria
Protestant University of Applied Sciences Bochum (Evangelische Hochschule Bochum)	Bochum	North Rhine-Westphalia	ecclesiastical (protestant)	1971	2665	affiliated with the Evangelical Church in the Rhineland, Evangelical Church of Westphalia and Church of Lippe
Protestant University of Applied Sciences Berlin (Evangelische Hochschule Berlin)	Berlin	Berlin	ecclesiastical (protestant)	1904	1625	affiliated with the Evangelical Church Berlin - Brandenburg - Silesian Upper Lusatia
Protestant University of Applied Sciences Darmstadt (Evangelische Hochschule Darmstadt)	Darmstadt	Hesse	ecclesiastical (protestant)	1971	1210	affiliated with the Evangelical Church in Hessen and Nassau and Evangelical Church of Hessen Electorate-Waldeck
Protestant University of Applied Sciences Dresden (Evangelische Hochschule Dresden)	Dresden	Saxony	ecclesiastical (protestant)	1991	826	affiliated with the Evangelical-Lutheran Church of Saxony
Protestant University of Applied Sciences Ludwigsburg (Evangelische Hochschule Ludwigsburg)	Ludwigsburg	Baden-Württemberg	ecclesiastical (protestant)	1971	1312	affiliated with the Evangelical-Lutheran Church in Württemberg
FHD University of Applied Sciences (Fachhochschule Dresden)	Dresden	Saxony	private	2010	513	
FHDW University of Applied Sciences (Fachhochschule für die Wirtschaft Hannover)	Hanover	Lower Saxony	private	1996	564	
University of Applied Sciences for Sports and Management Potsdam (Fachhochschule für Sport und Management Potsdam)	Potsdam	Brandenburg	private	2009	610	
FH Aachen	Aachen	North Rhine-Westphalia	public	1971	13527	
Diakonie University of Applied Sciences (FH der Diakonie Bielefeld-Bethel)	Bielefeld	North Rhine-Westphalia	private	2006	703	
Paderborn University of Applied Sciences in Business Administration (FH der Wirtschaft Paderborn)	Paderborn, Bergisch Gladbach, Bielefeld, Mettmann, Marburg	North Rhine-Westphalia	private	1993	2059	
Dortmund University of Applied Sciences and Arts	Dortmund	North Rhine-Westphalia	public	1971	13315	
University of Applied Sciences Erfurt	Erfurt	Thuringia	public	1991	4000	
Hermannsburg Mission Seminary	Südheide	Lower Saxony	private	2012	63	
Kiel University of Applied Sciences	Kiel	Schleswig-Holstein	public	1969	7773	
FH Münster	Münster	North Rhine-Westphalia	public	1971	14188	
University of Applied Sciences and Arts in Ottersberg (Hochschule für Künste im Sozialen Ottersberg)	Ottersberg	Lower Saxony	private	1967	292	
FH Potsdam	Potsdam	Brandenburg	public	1991	3636	
Stuttgart Media University	Stuttgart	Baden-Württemberg	public	1903	5391	
South Westphalia University of Applied Sciences	Iserlohn, Hagen, Lüdenscheid, Meschede, Soest	North Rhine-Westphalia	public	2002	10183	
FH Wedel	Wedel	Schleswig-Holstein	private	1969	982	
West Coast University of Applied Sciences	Heide	Schleswig-Holstein	public	1993	1379	
Fliedner University of Applied Sciences Düsseldorf	Düsseldorf	North Rhine-Westphalia	private	2011	2080	
Frankfurt University of Applied Sciences	Frankfurt	Hesse	public	1971	15255	
GISMA Business School	Potsdam	Brandenburg	private	1999	1453	
German University for Applied Sciences (Deutsche Hochschule für angewandte Wissenschaften)	Potsdam	Brandenburg	private	2022	468	
Albstadt-Sigmaringen University	Albstadt, Sigmaringen	Baden-Württemberg	public	1971	2613	
Anhalt University of Applied Sciences	Köthen, Bernburg, Dessau-Roßlau	Saxony-Anhalt	public	1991	6687	
University of Applied Sciences Biberach	Biberach an der Riß	Baden-Württemberg	public	1964	2233	
Hochschule Bonn-Rhein-Sieg University of Applied Sciences	Sankt Augustin, Rheinbach, Hennef, Bonn	North Rhine-Westphalia	public	1995	8990	
City University of Applied Sciences	Bremen	Bremen	public	1982	8661	
Bremerhaven University of Applied Sciences	Bremerhaven	Bremen	public	1975	2981	
University of Applied Sciences of the German Social Accident Insurance (Hochschule der Deutschen Gesetzlichen Unfallversicherung)	Bad Hersfeld, Hennef	Hesse North Rhine-Westphalia	private	1996	691	
Düsseldorf University of Applied Sciences	Düsseldorf	North Rhine-Westphalia	public	1971	10820	
Esslingen University of Applied Sciences	Esslingen	Baden-Württemberg	public	1868	6013	
Hamburg University of Applied Sciences	Hamburg	Hamburg	public	1970	16427	
Weihenstephan-Triesdorf University of Applied Science	Freising, Weidenbach, Straubing, Lindau	Bavaria	public	1971	5680	
HFM University of Applied Sciences for Finance & Management (Hochschule für Finanzwirtschaft & Management Bonn)	Bonn	North Rhine-Westphalia	private	2003	831	
Rottenburg University of Applied Forest Sciences	Rottenburg am Neckar	Baden-Württemberg	public	1954	898	
Cusanus University for Social Transformation	Koblenz	Rhineland-Palatinate	private	2015	141	
HfG Schwäbisch Gmünd	Schwäbisch Gmünd	Baden-Württemberg	public	1776	660	
HTW Berlin	Berlin	Berlin	public	1994	14973	
Saarland University of Applied Sciences	Saarbrücken	Saarland	public	1946	6031	
German University of Prevention and Health Management (Deutsche Hochschule für Prävention und Gesundheitsmanagement)	Saarbrücken	Saarland	public	2002	6568	
HTW Dresden	Dresden	Saxony	public	1992	4613	
Reutlingen University	Reutlingen	Baden-Württemberg	public	1855	5017	
Leipzig University of Applied Sciences	Leipzig	Saxony	public	1992	6702	
Private University of Applied Sciences for Business and Technology (Private Hochschule für Wirtschaft und Technik Vechta)	Oldenburg	Lower Saxony	private	1998	559	
FH Furtwangen	Furtwangen	Baden-Württemberg	public	1850	4657	
Hamm-Lippstadt University of Applied Sciences	Hamm, Lippstadt	North Rhine-Westphalia	public	2009	4332	
Harz University of Applied Sciences	Wernigerode, Halberstadt	Saxony-Anhalt	public	1991	2840	
Heilbronn University of Applied Sciences	Heilbronn, Künzelsau, Schwäbisch Hall	Baden-Württemberg	public	1961	6609	
Karlsruhe University of Applied Sciences	Karlsruhe	Baden-Württemberg	public	1878	6946	
Konstanz University of Applied Sciences	Konstanz	Baden-Württemberg	public	1906	4278	
Magdeburg-Stendal University of Applied Sciences	Magdeburg, Stendal	Saxony-Anhalt	public	1991	5177	
Mannheim University of Applied Sciences	Mannheim	Baden-Württemberg	public	1898	5083	
Mittweida University of Applied Sciences	Mittweida	Saxony	public	1867	6086	
Niederrhein University of Applied Sciences	Krefeld, Mönchengladbach	North Rhine-Westphalia	public	1971	12969	
Nürtingen-Geislingen University of Applied Science	Nürtingen, Geislingen	Baden-Württemberg	public	1949	5226	
University of Applied Sciences Offenburg	Offenburg, Gengenbach	Baden-Württemberg	public	1964	3656	
Pforzheim University of Applied Sciences	Pforzheim	Baden-Württemberg	public	1877	5574	
University of Applied Sciences Ravensburg-Weingarten	Weingarten	Baden-Württemberg	public	1964	3497	
Rhine-Waal University of Applied Sciences	Kleve, Kamp-Lintfort	North Rhine-Westphalia	public	2009	6043	
Ruhr West University of Applied Sciences	Mühlheim, Bottrop	North Rhine-Westphalia	public	2009	5460	
Zittau/Görlitz University of Applied Sciences	Zittau, Görlitz	Saxony	public	1992	2256	
Darmstadt University of Applied Sciences	Darmstadt	Hesse	public	1971	14048	
HDBW University of Applied Sciences (HDBW Hochschule der Bayerischen Wirtschaft für angewandte Wissenschaften)	Munich	Bavaria	private	2012	459	
HFH University of Applied Sciences (Hamburger Fern-Hochschule)	Hamburg	Hamburg	private	1997	14265	
Aalen University of Applied Sciences	Aalen	Baden-Württemberg	public	1962	4167	
Bielefeld University of Applied Sciences	Bielefeld	North Rhine-Westphalia	public	1971	9977	
Bochum University of Applied Sciences	Bochum	North Rhine-Westphalia	public	1971	7103	
Ostfalia University of Applied Sciences	Salzgitter, Wolfenbüttel, Wolfsburg, Suderburg	Lower Saxony	public	1971	10068	
Nordakademie University of Applied Sciences	Elmshorn	Schleswig-Holstein	private	1992	2506	
Mannheim University of Applied Management Studies (Hochschule der Wirtschaft für Management)	Mannheim	Baden-Württemberg	private	2011	226	
Emden/Leer University of Applied Sciences	Emden, Leer	Lower Saxony	public	2009	3848	
Flensburg University of Applied Sciences	Flensburg	Schleswig-Holstein	public	1886	2925	
Fulda University of Applied Sciences	Fulda	Hesse	public	1974	8949	
HSAP Berlin (Hochschule für soziale Arbeit und Pädagogik)	Berlin	Berlin	private	2013	544	
Ansbach University of Applied Sciences	Ansbach	Bavaria	public	1996	3993	
Coburg University of Applied Sciences	Coburg	Bavaria	public	1971	4648	
University of Applied Labour Studies of the Federal Employment Agency (Hochschule der Bundesagentur für Arbeit)	Mannheim, Schwerin	Baden-Württemberg, Mecklenburg-Vorpommern	public	2006	1554	affiliated with the Federal Employment Agancy (Bundesagentur für Arbeit)
Hof University of Applied Sciences	Hof	Bavaria	public	1994	3763	
Kempten University of Applied Sciences	Kempten	Bavaria	public	1977	4643	
University of Applied Sciences Landshut	Landshut	Bavaria	public	1978	4916	
Munich University of Applied Sciences	Munich	Bavaria	public	1971	18535	
Neu-Ulm University of Applied Sciences	Neu-Ulm	Bavaria	public	1994	4133	
University of Applied Management	Ismaning	Bavaria	private	2004	3510	
Bochum University of Applied Sciences	Bochum	North Rhine-Westphalia	public	1971	2053	
Eberswalde University of Applied Sciences for Health Professions (Hochschule für Gesundheitsfachberufe Eberswalde)	Eberswalde	Brandenburg	private	2023	46	
University of Communication and Design (Hochschule für Kommunikation und Gestaltung)	Stuttgart, Ulm	Baden-Württemberg	private	2012	32	
Eberswalde University for Sustainable Development	Eberswalde	Brandenburg	public	1830	2281	
Stuttgart Technical University of Applied Sciences	Stuttgart	Baden-Württemberg	public	1832	3983	
Ludwigshafen University of Applied Sciences	Ludwigshafen	Rhineland-Palatinate	public	1971	4127	
Geisenheim University	Geisenheim	Hesse	public	2013	1428	
Hanover University of Applied Sciences and Arts	Hanover	Lower Saxony	public	1971	8629	
Hildesheim/Holzminden/Göttingen University of Applied Sciences and Arts	Hildesheim, Holzminden, Göttingen	Lower Saxony	public	1971	6162	
Kaiserslautern University of Applied Sciences	Kaiserslautern, Pirmasens, Zweibrücken	Rhineland-Palatinate	public	1971	5174	
Koblenz University of Applied Sciences	Koblenz, Remagen, Höhr-Grenzhausen	Rhineland-Palatinate	public	1996	8622	
Mainz University of Applied Sciences	Mainz	Rhineland-Palatinate	public	1757	5407	
Merseburg University of Applied Sciences	Merseburg	Saxony-Anhalt	public	1992	3059	
Neubrandenburg University of Applied Sciences	Neubrandenburg	Brandenburg	public	1991	1832	
Nordhausen University of Applied Sciences	Nordhausen	Thuringia	public	1997	1753	
Osnabrück University of Applied Sciences	Osnabrück	Lower Saxony	public	1971	13013	
RheinMain University of Applied Sciences	Wiesbaden	Hesse	public	1971	12170	
Schmalkalden University of Applied Sciences	Schmalkalden	Thuringia	public	1991	2933	
Stralsund University of Applied Sciences	Stralsund	Mecklenburg-Vorpommern	public	1991	1770	
Trier University of Applied Sciences	Trier, Hoppstädten-Weiersbach, Idar-Oberstein	Rhineland-Palatinate	public	1996	6426	
Weserbergland University of Applied Sciences	Hamelin	Lower Saxony	private	1989, 2010	451	
Jade University of Applied Sciences	Wilhelmshaven, Oldenburg, Elsfleth	Lower Saxony	public	2009	6105	
Wismar University of Applied Sciences: Technology, Business and Design	Wismar	Mecklenburg-Vorpommern	public	1908	7263	
Worms University of Applied Sciences	Worms	Rhineland-Palatinate	public	1978	3121	
hochschule 21	Buxtehude	Lower Saxony	private	2004	1061	
HSBA Hamburg School of Business Administration	Hamburg	Hamburg	private	2004	1054	
Humanistic University Berlin	Berlin	Berlin	private	2021	139	
Berlin School of Economics and Law	Berlin	Berlin	public	1971	12 604	
International University of Applied Sciences Liebenzell	Bad Liebenzell	Baden-Württemberg	ecclesiastical (protestant)	2011	318	affiliated with the Liebenzell Mission
Munich University of Applied Languages	Munich	Bavaria	private	2006	264	
INU – Innovative University of Applied Sciences	Cologne	North Rhine-Westphalia	private	2022	107	
IST University of Management	Düsseldorf	North Rhine-Westphalia	private	2013	4797	
Karlshochschule International University	Karlsruhe	Baden-Württemberg	private	2004	255	
Catholic University of Applied Sciences Freiburg	Freiburg	Baden-Württemberg	ecclesiastical (catholic)	1971	1789	affiliated with the Archdiocese of Freiburg, Diocese of Rottenburg-Stuttgart, Caritas Germany, Caritas Freiburg and Caritas Rottenburg-Stuttgart
Catholic University of Applied Sciences North Rhine-Westphalia	Aachen, Cologne, Münster, Paderborn	North Rhine-Westphalia	ecclesiastical (catholic)	1971	5464	affiliated with the Diocese of Aachen, Archdiocese of Cologne, Diocese of Münster and Archdiocese of Paderborn
Catholic University of Applied Sciences Berlin (Katholische Hochschule für Sozialwesen Berlin)	Berlin	Berlin	ecclesiastical (catholic)	1991	1264	affiliated with the Archdiocese of Berlin
Catholic University of Applied Sciences Mainz	Mainz	Rhineland-Palatinate	ecclesiastical (catholic)	1972	1396	affiliated with the Archdiocese of Cologne, Diocese of Limburg, Diocese of Mainz, Diocese of Speyer and Diocese of Trier
Catholic University of Applied Sciences Munich (Katholische Stiftungshochschule München)	Munich, Benediktbeuern	Bavaria	ecclesiastical (catholic)	1971	2410	affiliated with the bavarian dioceses
Kolping University of Applied Sciences for Health and Social Affairs	Cologne	North Rhine-Westphalia	private	2019	123	
Leibniz University of Applied Sciences	Hanover	Lower Saxony	private	2011	729	
MSB Medical School Berlin	Berlin	Berlin	private	2012	3173	
Merz Akademie	Stuttgart	Baden-Württemberg	private	1918	205	
MSH Medical School Hamburg	Hamburg	Hamburg	private	2009	5512	
Munich Business School	Munich	Bavaria	private	1991	705	
Northern Business School	Hamburg	Hamburg	private	2007	871	
Amberg-Weiden University of Applied Sciences	Amberg, Weiden	Bavaria	public	1994	4205	
Regensburg University of Applied Sciences	Regensburg	Bavaria	public	1971	10999	
PFH Private University of Applied Sciences	Göttingen, Stade	Lower Saxony	private	1995	4753	
Doctoral College for Applied Research of North Rhine-Westphalia (Promotionskolleg NRW)	Bochum	North Rhine-Westphalia	public	2020	260	
Provadis School of International Management and Technology	Frankfurt	Hesse	private	2003	847	
Quadriga University of Applied Sciences	Berlin	Berlin	private	2009	105	
University of Applied Sciences Cologne	Cologne	North Rhine-Westphalia	private	1971	5487	
Steinbeis University	Berlin	Berlin	private	1998	4040	
Technical University of Applied Sciences Augsburg	Augsburg	Bavaria	public	1710	7511	
Bingen Technical University of Applied Sciences	Bingen	Rhineland-Palatinate	public	1897	2160	
Brandenburg University of Applied Sciences	Brandenburg an der Havel	Brandenburg	public	1992	2487	
Deggendorf Institute of Technology	Deggendorf	Bavaria	public	1994	8854	
Ingolstadt University of Applied Sciences	Ingolstadt	Bavaria	public	1994	8154	
Cologne University of Applied Sciences	Cologne, Gummersbach, Leverkusen	North Rhine-Westphalia	public	1971	20352	
Technical University of Applied Sciences Lübeck	Lübeck	Schleswig-Holstein	public	1969	4765	
University of Applied Sciences Mittelhessen	Gießen, Friedberg, Wetzlar	Hesse	public	1971	15148	
Nuremberg Institute of Technology Georg Simon Ohm	Nuremberg	Bavaria	public	1823, 1971	12557	
Ulm University of Applied Sciences	Ulm	Baden-Württemberg	public	1960	2905	
Technical University of Applied Sciences Wildau	Wildau	Brandenburg	public	1991	3339	
Technical University of Applied Sciences Würzburg-Schweinfurt	Würzburg, Schweinfurt	Bavaria	public	1971	9131	
Technical University of Applied Sciences Aschaffenburg	Aschaffenburg	Bavaria	public	1995	3778	
Technical University of Applied Sciences Georg Agricola	Bochum	North Rhine-Westphalia	private	1816	2142	
TH OWL University of Applied Sciences and Arts	Lemgo, Detmold, Höxter, Herford, Minden	North Rhine-Westphalia	public	1971	5701	
Rosenheim University of Applied Sciences	Rosenheim, Burghausen, Ruhpolding, Traunstein, Mühldorf	Bavaria	public	1971	7358	
Theological Seminary in Elstal	Wustermark	Brandenburg	ecclesiastical (protestant)	1880	40	affiliated with the Union of Evangelical Free Churches in Germany
Theological Seminary in Reutlingen	Reutlingen	Baden-Württemberg	ecclesiastical (protestant)	1877	105	affiliated with the United Methodist Church
Tomorrow University of Applied Sciences	Frankfurt	Hesse	private	2021	272	
Touro College Berlin	Berlin	Berlin	private	2003	108	affiliated with the Touro University System
University of Labour Frankfurt	Frankfurt	Hesse	private	2021	73	
Westphalian University of Applied Sciences	Gelsenkirchen, Bocholt, Recklinghausen	North Rhine-Westphalia	public	1992	7155	
West Saxon University of Applied Sciences Zwickau	Zwickau	Saxony	public	1897	2953	
Wilhelm Büchner University of Applied Sciences	Darmstadt	Hesse	private	1997	4313	
XU Exponential University of Applied Sciences	Potsdam	Brandenburg	private	2018	108	
