= Education in North Rhine-Westphalia =

Overview of education in the German state of North Rhine-Westphalia

North Rhine-Westphalia is home to 14 universities and over 50 partly postgraduate colleges, with a total of over 500,000 students. Largest and oldest university is the University of Cologne (Universität zu Köln), founded in 1388 AD.

== List of universities and colleges ==
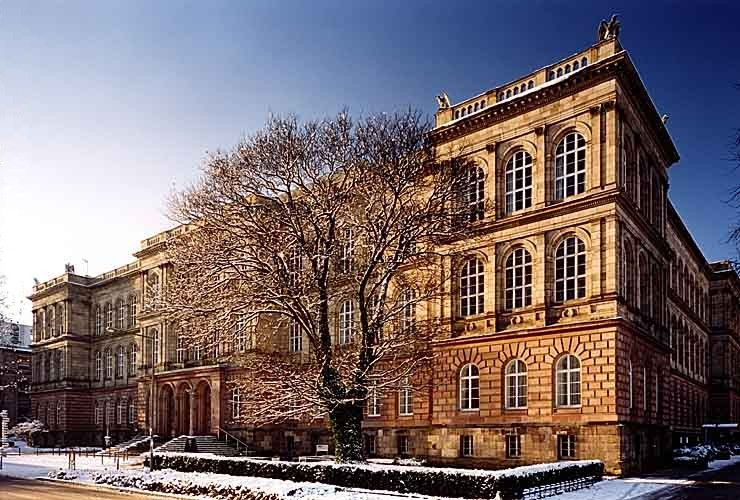
RWTH Aachen is one of Germany's leading universities of technology and was chosen by DFG as one of nine German Universities of Excellence.

- the RWTH Aachen University
- the Bielefeld University
- the University of Bochum
- the University of Bonn
- the University of Cologne
- the German Sport University Cologne
- the TU Dortmund University
- the University of Duisburg-Essen
- the University of Düsseldorf
- the FernUniversität Hagen
- the University of Münster
- the University of Paderborn
- the University of Siegen
- the Witten/Herdecke University
- the University of Wuppertal
- the Rhine-Waal University of Applied Sciences
- the Hamm-Lippstadt University of Applied Sciences
