= Alexander Licht =

German politician (1952–2026)

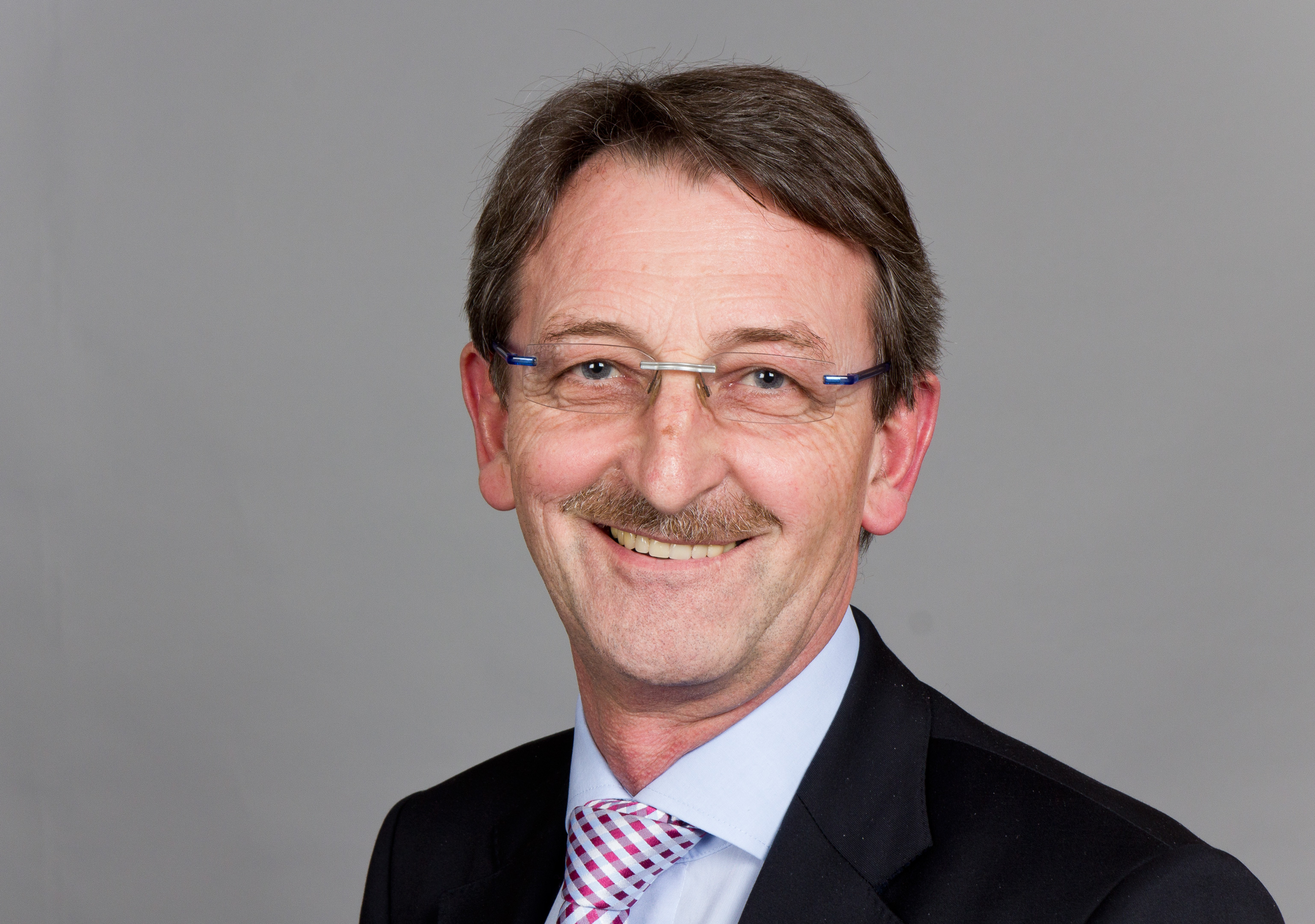
- Licht in 2014

Member of the Landtag of Rhineland-Palatinate
- In office 18 May 1991 – 1 September 2020
- Succeeded by: Karina Wächter

Personal details
- Born: 13 September 1952 Brauneberg, Rhineland-Palatinate, West Germany
- Died: 9 June 2026 (aged 73)
- Party: Christian Democratic Union of Germany
- Spouse: Conny
- Children: 3

Alexander Licht (13 September 1952 – 9 June 2026) was a German politician who served in the Landtag of Rhineland-Palatinate from 1991 to 2020, as a member of the Christian Democratic Union of Germany. He was chair of the CDU association in Bernkastel-Wittlich for around 30 years and was a member of the district council from 1979 to 2014.

== Early life ==
Alexander Licht was born in Brauneberg on 13 September 1952. He attended Brauneberg Elementary School from 1959 to 1967, commercial school from 1967 to 1968, and vocational business school from 1968 to 1970, and viticulture school from 1970 to 1972. He was a member of the Bundeswehr from 1973 to 1974. He received a Master of Wine in 1975.

== Career ==
In 1975, Licht joined the Christian Democratic Union of Germany (CDU). He became a member of the Bernkastel-Wittlich District Council in 1979, and served until 2014. Licht was chair of the CDU district association of Bernkastel-Wittlich for around 30 years. He was a member of the 13th, 14th, and 15th Federal Conventions in 2009, 2010, and 2012.

The Kues Academy for European Intellectual History was chaired by Licht. This institution was reorganised into Cusanus Hochschule, which Licht was one of the founders of.

=== Landtag ===
Licht became a member of the Landtag of Rhineland-Palatinate in 1991. During his tenure in the landtag Licht was a member of the Environment and Foresty, Economic Affairs and Transport, European Affairs, and the Agriculture, Viticulture and Forestry committees. Adolf Weiland and Licht were deputy chairs of the CDU parliamentary group.

On 23 June 2020, Licht announced that he would resign from the landtag effective on 31 August. Karina Wächter was selected to replace him.

== Personal life ==
Licht was a member of the Catholic Church. He worked as a winemaker. He married Conny, with whom he had three children, in 1977. Licht died on 9 June 2026 after suffering from an illness.

== Works cited ==
=== News ===
- Beckmann, Clemens (6 February 2020). "Streit um Namen, Leitbild und Prüfungen". Trierischer Volksfreund. Archived from the original on 19 March 2021.
- Linz, Hans-Peter (10 June 2026). "CDU-Politiker Alexander Licht ist tot". Trierischer Volksfreund. Archived from the original on 11 June 2026.

=== Web ===
- "Licht, Alexnader 1952–". Rhineland-Palatinate Personal Database. Archived from the original on 2 March 2024.
- "Spitzengespräch von Bischöfen und CDU Rheinland-Pfalz". Diocese of Trier. 24 January 2019. Archived from the original on 4 August 2025.
- "Zusammensetzung des Landtags" (PDF). Landtag of Rhineland-Palatinate. 21 August 2020. Archived (PDF) from the original on 29 June 2024.
- Bach, Stefanie (10 June 2026). "Trauer um Alexander Licht". Christian Democratic Union of Germany. Archived from the original on 11 June 2026.
- Licht, Alexander. "Über meine Person". Alexander Licht. Archived from the original on 2 February 2019.
