= Shield wall (castle) =

Curtain wall which defends the only practical line of approach to a hill castle

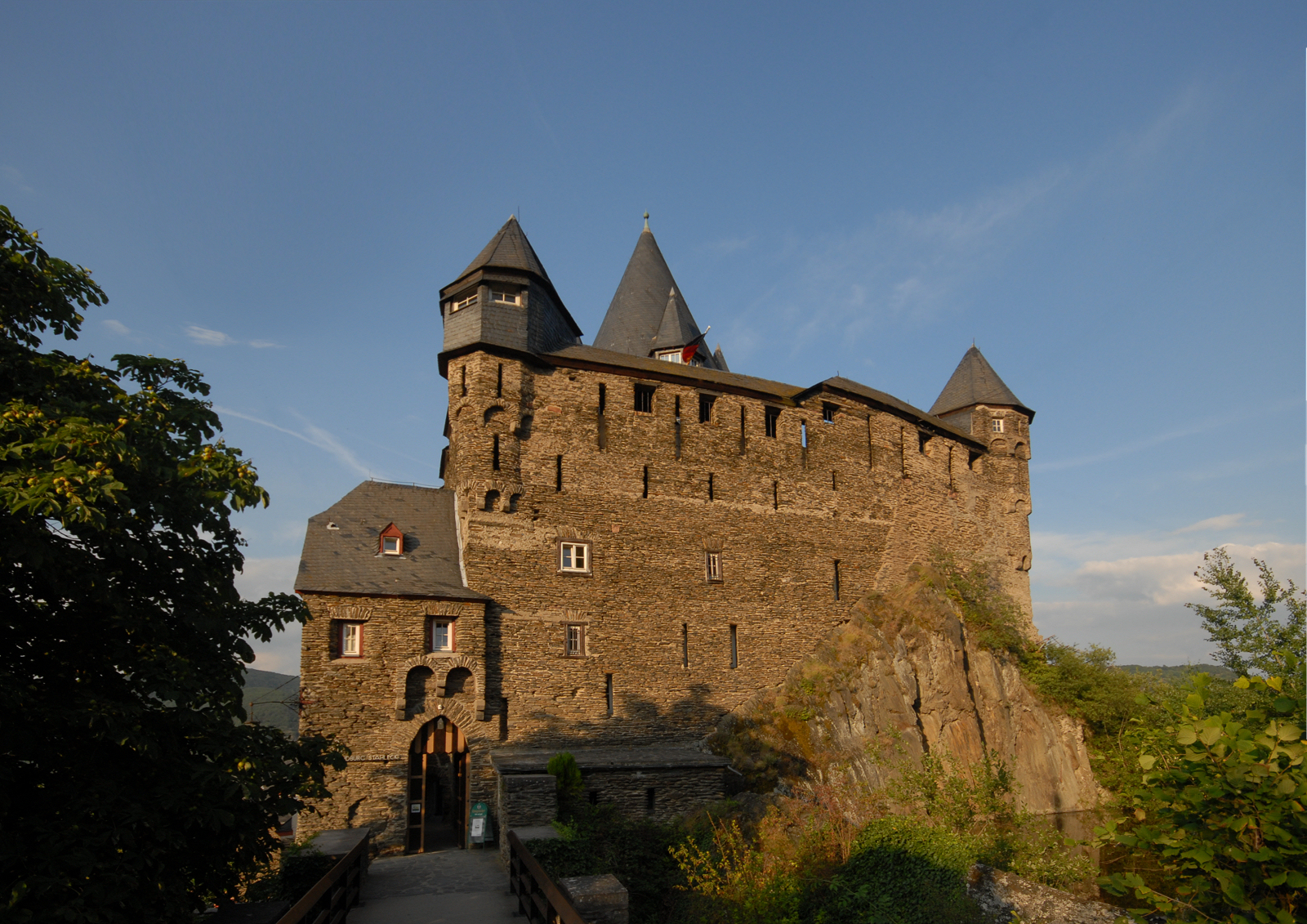
The shield wall of Stahleck Castle

A shield wall, also shield-wall or Schildmauer, refers to the highest and strongest curtain wall, or tower of a castle that defends the only practicable line of approach to a castle built on a mountain, hill or headland. German sources may refer to a shield wall that protects two or more sides as a Hoher Mantel or Mantelmauer, which is variously translated as "mantle-wall", "mantle wall" or "high screen-wall". There is often no clear, definitive distinction between a shield wall and a mantle wall.

== Occurrence ==
Shield walls are found on many German and Austrian hill castles, but are not common in Great Britain or Ireland where the terrain of the rocky hills on which castles were built did not favour such constructions. However some castles in those areas built on headlands such as Tantallon and Old Head do have a similar feature.

== Origin and description ==
The construction of shield walls was common in the late 12th century in Germany and Austria and may have been a reaction to the increasing use of heavy siege engines such as the trebuchet (the height of the walls protecting the buildings beyond from arching fire). The thickness of a shield wall could, in extreme cases, be as much as 12 metres (39 ft) (e.g. Neuscharfeneck Castle). Behind the battlements at the top of the wall there was usually an allure or wall walk; the shield wall could also be flanked by two wall towers. In many cases the shield wall replaced the bergfried, for example in the ruined castle of Sporkenburg in the Westerwald forest or the ruins of the Alt Eberstein near the city of Baden-Baden. In other cases, for example at Liebenzell Castle, the bergfried was built in the centre of the shield wall.

== Gallery ==
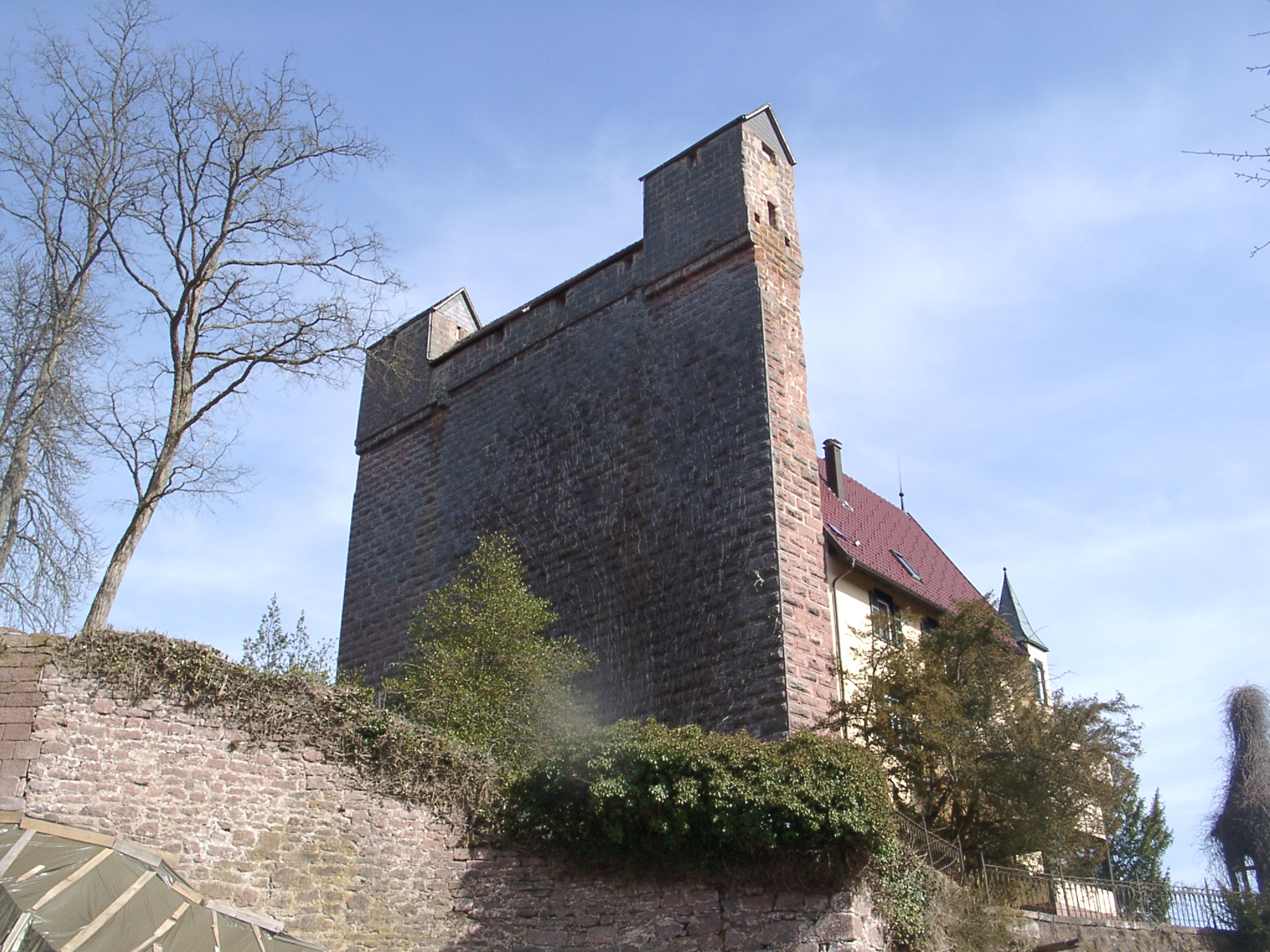
The shield wall of Berneck Castle in the Black Forest

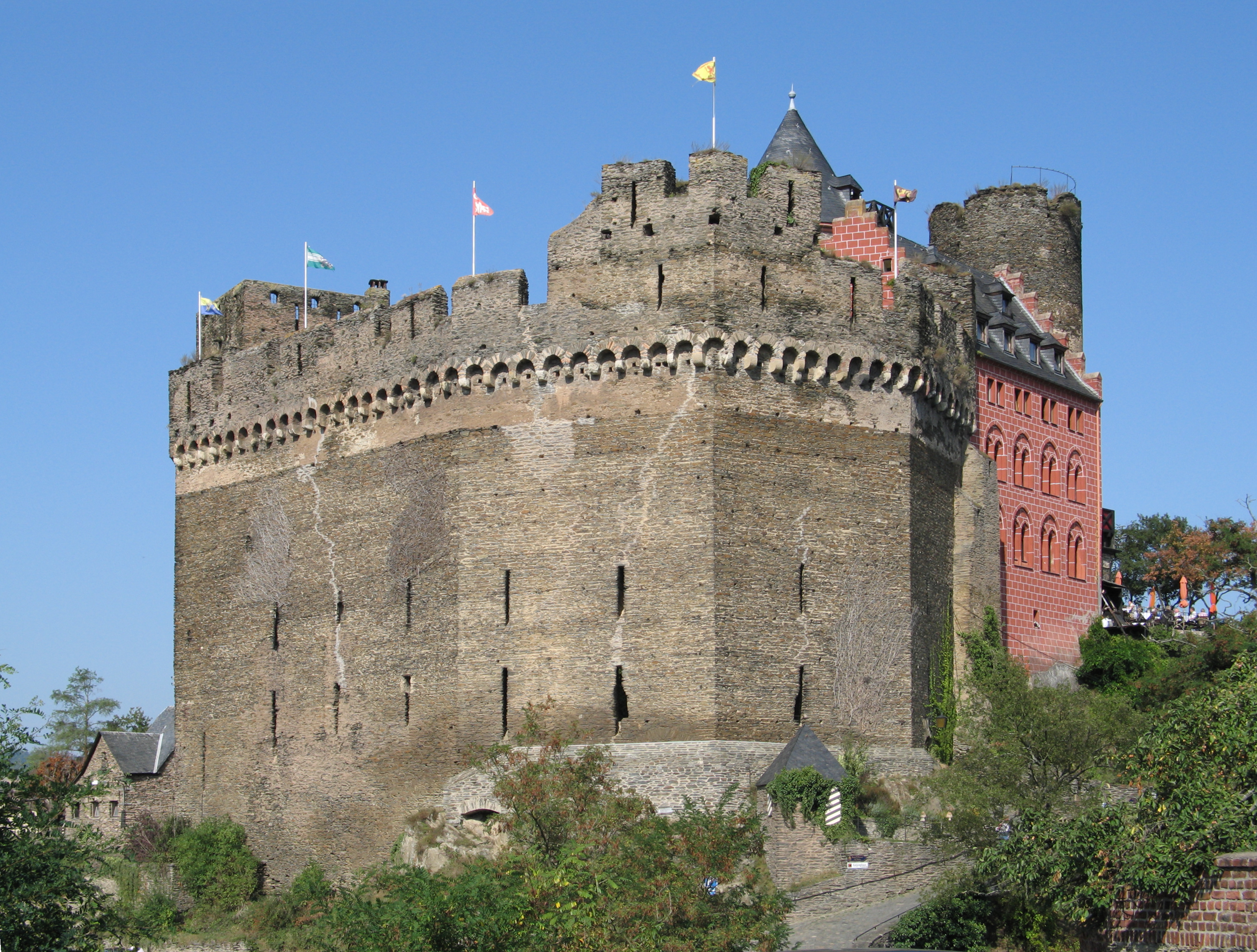
The shield wall of the Schönburg near Oberwesel

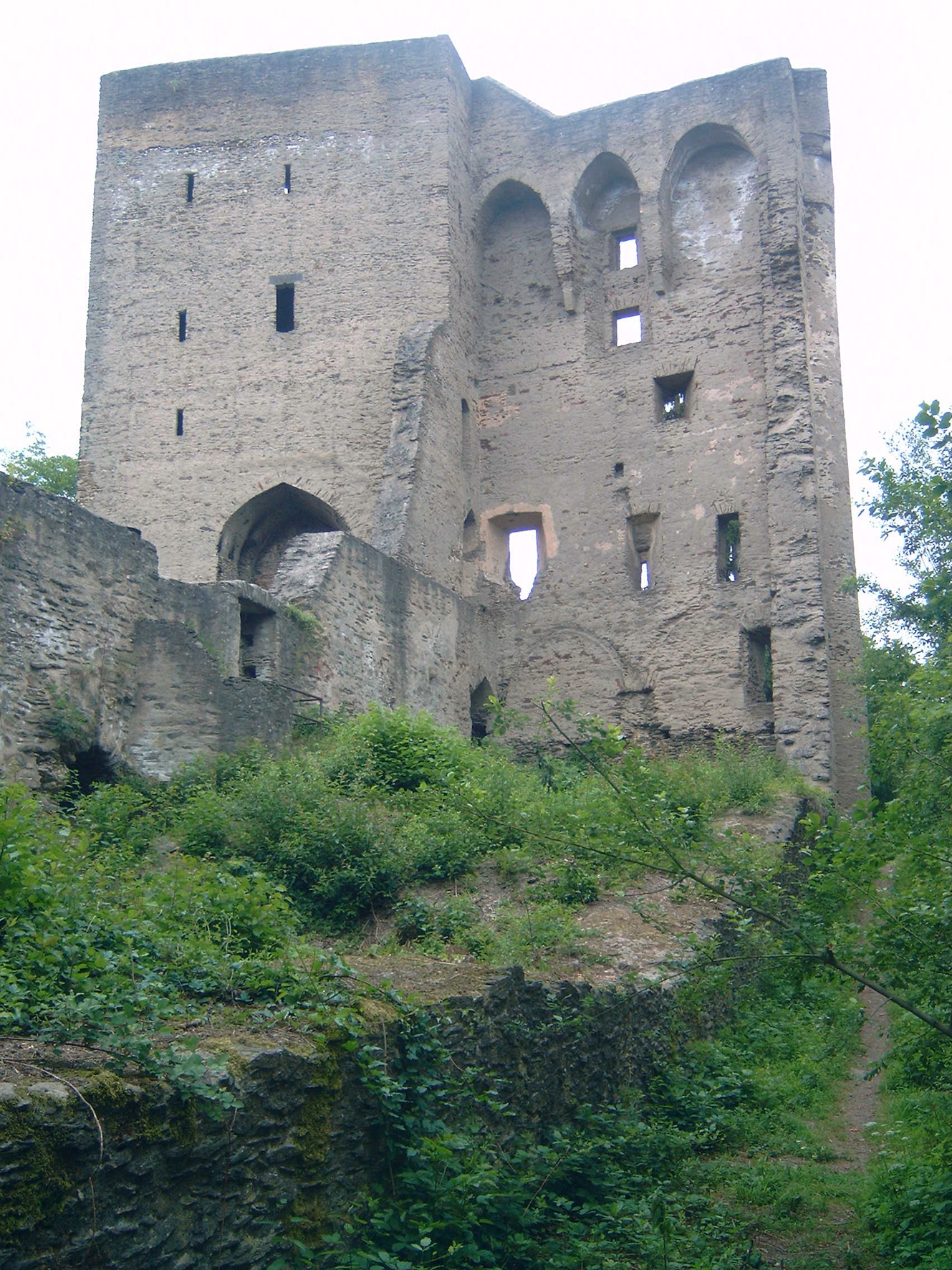
The shield wall of the Sporkenburg

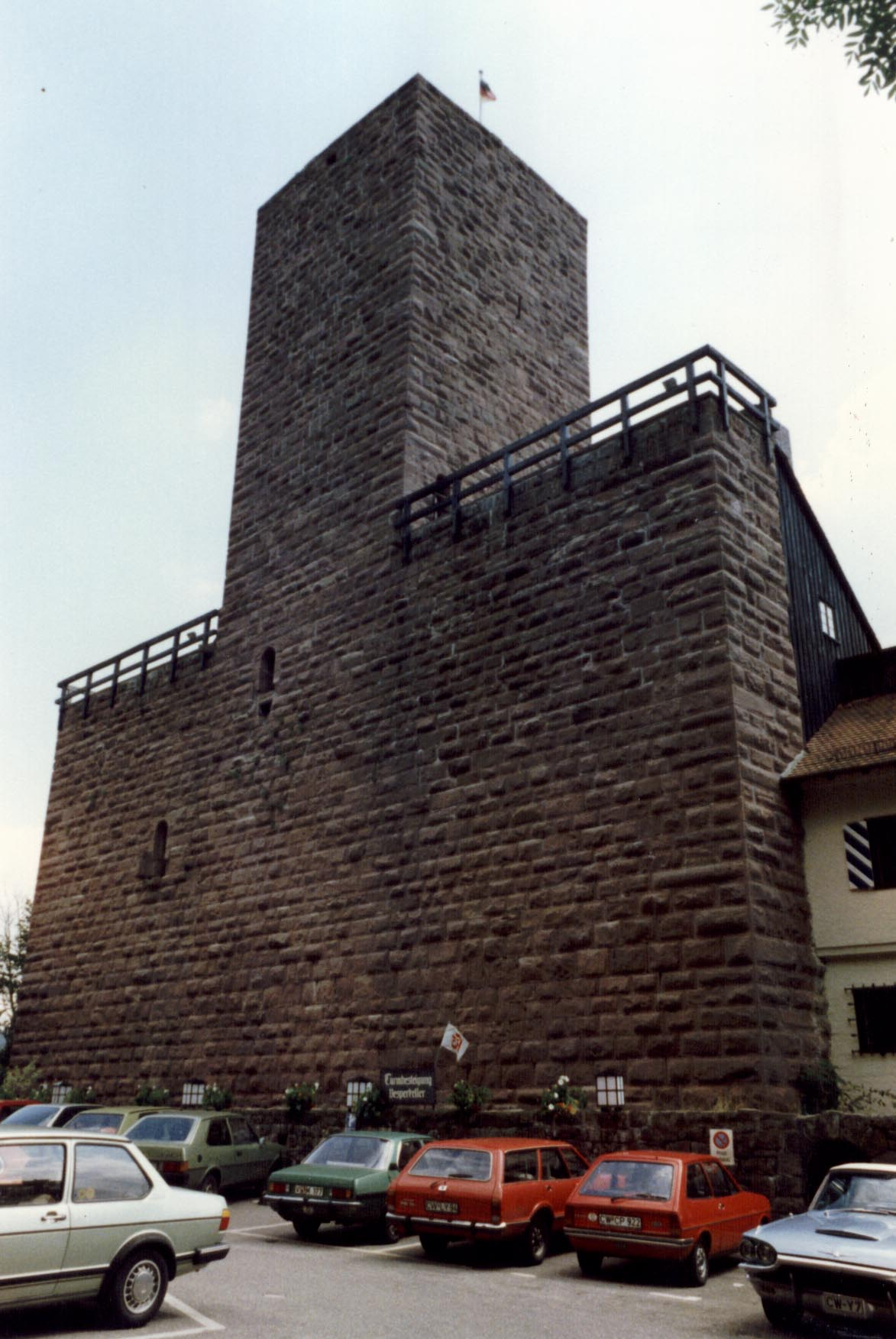
The shield wall of Liebenzell Castle which is combined with a bergfried

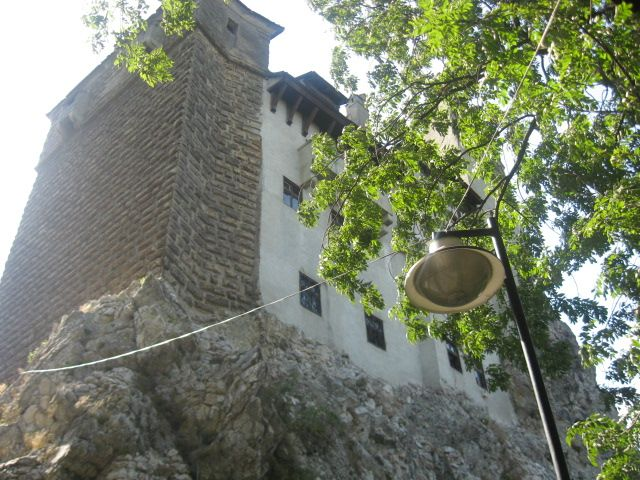
The shield wall of Törzburg (Bran Castle) in Transylvania

== Sources ==
- Cairns, Conrad (1989), Medieval Castles, Cambridge Topic Books (illustrated, reprint ed.), Lerner Publications Company, p. 31, ISBN 9780822512356
- Freudenrich, Craig (2013), How Castles Work, How Stuff Works
- Skaarup, Harold (2003), Siegecraft - No Fortress Impregnable, Universe, p. 203, ISBN 9780595275212
- Taylor, Robert R. (1998), The Castles of the Rhine: Recreating the Middle Ages in Modern Germany, Wilfrid Laurier University Press, ISBN 9780889202689
