= Liebenzell Castle =

- Burg Liebenzell
- Bad Liebenzell
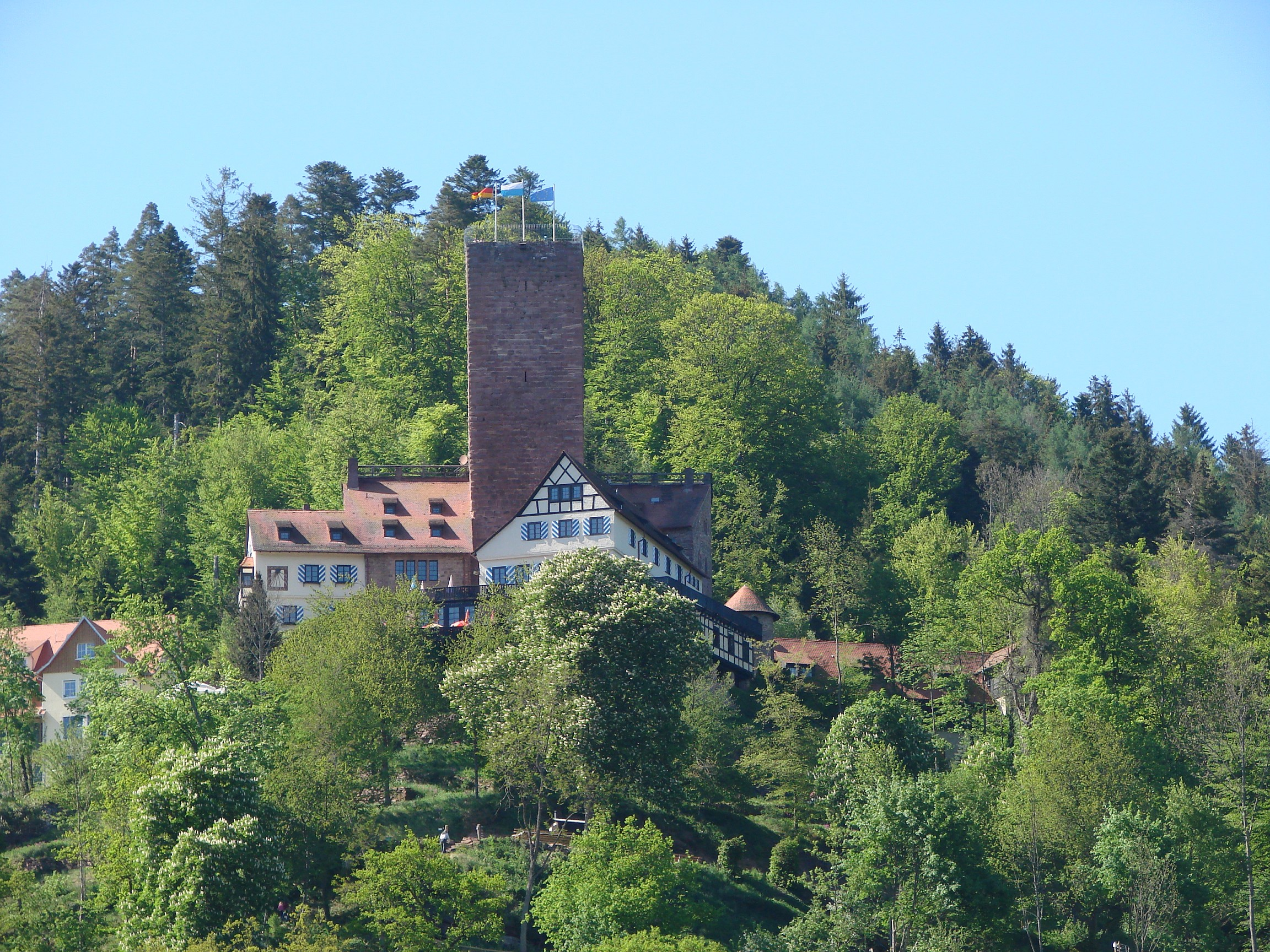

Site information
- Type: hill castle, spur castle
- Code: DE-BW
- Condition: preserved

Location
- Coordinates: 48°46′36″N 8°43′33″E
- Height: 450 m above sea level (NN)

Site history
- Built: 1100 bis 1200

Garrison information
- Occupants: counts

Liebenzell Castle (German: Burg Liebenzell) is a hill castle on a sloping hill spur on the sides of the Schlossberg ("castle hill") above the town of Bad Liebenzell in the district of Calw in the south German state of Baden-Württemberg. The fortification was once the most important castle in the Württemberg part of the Black Forest.

== History ==
The castle was built in the 12th century by the counts of Calw. In 1196 the counts of Eberstein were recorded as the castle's owners. From 1220 to 1230 the castle was extended. It was destroyed in the 16th century and in 1692 and rebuilt in 1954.

Today the castle is owned by the International Forum of Liebenzell Castle. It is used as a youth training centre for the Bad Liebenzell International Youth Forum and has a restaurant.

== Layout ==
The castle comprises an irregular, pentagonal fortification with a mighty shield wall, into which a square bergfried with a garderobe has been integrated. The great hall (Palas) is decorated with ornamental ogival openings (Spitzbogenöffnungen). The six-storey bergfried has a height of 32 metres and has an entrance six metres in height, a wall thickness of two metres and an area of about 9 by 9 metres.

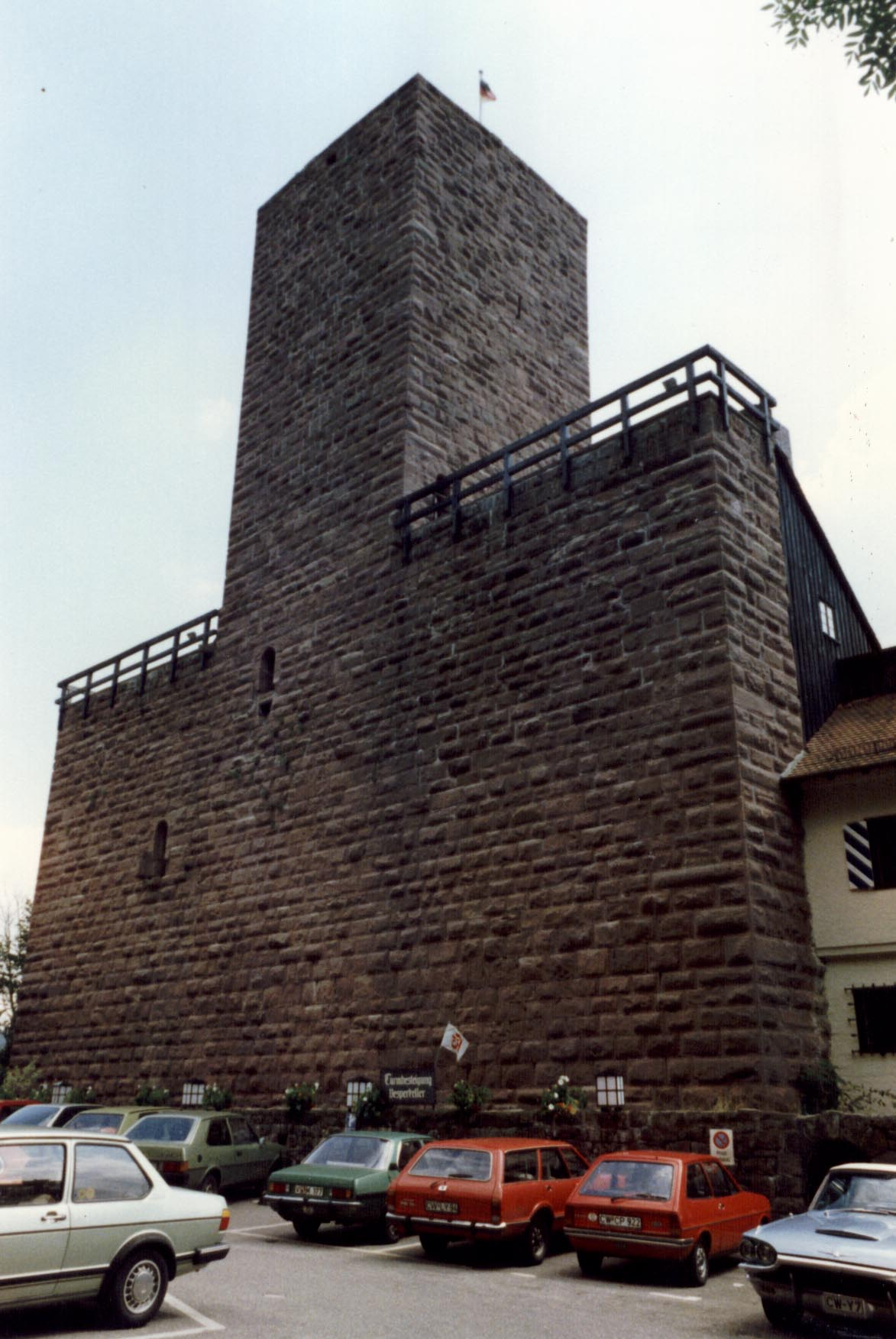
The shield wall with its integrated bergfried

== Sources ==
- Gedat, Gustav-Adolf (1963). Burg Liebenzell. Kleines Modell für ein neues Europa. Thorbecke, Constance/Stuttgart.
- Krahe, Friedrich-Wilhelm (1994). Burgen des deutschen Mittelalters. Grundriss-Lexikon. Flechsig Verlag, Würzburg, ISBN 3-8035-1372-3.
- Zimmermann, Wolfgang (1981). Unterwegs zu Burgen und Schlössern im Schwarzwald. Ausflüge und Wanderungen zu den schönsten und interessantesten Burgen und Schlössern. Fink-Kümmerly und Frey, Ostfildern, ISBN 3-7718-0409-4.
