= Pacific Islands University =

Private university in Guam

- Other names: PIU
- Type: Private university
- Established: 1976
- Religious affiliation: Christian
- Location: Mangilao, Guam; 13.4650°N 144.8357°E
- Website: Official website
- Location in Guam

Pacific Islands University (PIU) is a private Christian university in Mangilao, Guam. Founded in 1976, the university offers Associate in Arts and Bachelor of Arts degrees in Bible and Liberal Arts.

PIU was founded by the Liebenzell Mission and it was recognized as a theological university in 2009.

== Administration ==
The board of directors for Pacific Islands Bible College represents the Liebenzell Mission International, Palau Evangelical Church, and Yap Evangelical Church. The faculty and staff consist of islanders, as well as missionaries from Germany and the United States.
