= Liebenzell Mission =

Global evangelical organization

The Liebenzell Mission is a cluster of like-minded Evangelical mission organizations in Austria, Canada, Germany, Hungary, Japan, Korea, the Netherlands, Switzerland, and the United States. With roots in German Pietism, their missionaries are involved in Bible translation, church planting, education, evangelism, pastoral ministry, media outreach, pastoral formation, medical care, and community development in 30 countries. There are about 270 missionaries. Liebenzell Germany is the largest of the organizations. They have a Theological seminary at Bad Liebenzell, accredited by the German "federal science council" (Wissenschaftsrat), the State of Baden-Württemberg and ACQUIN as "Internationale Hochschule Liebenzell (IHL)", a brother and sisterhood, a fellowship of deaconesses, a large retreat center, and a literature distribution ministry headquartered in Bad Liebenzell.

Pacific Islands Bible College, today Pacific Island University on Guam and in Micronesia was founded by and is still staffed by Liebenzell missionaries.
