= Tomorrow University =

German distance learning university

Tomorrow University of Applied Sciences
- Motto: We educate and empower the brave to create a better tomorrow
- Type: Private, online,Applied Sciences
- Established: 2021; 5 years ago
- Founders: Christian Rebernik and Thomas Funke
- Accreditation: ACQUIN,FIBAA,HMWK
- Students: over 1,000
- Location: Frankfurt, Germany
- Campus: Remote
- Website: www.tomorrow.university

Tomorrow University of Applied Sciences (abbreviated ToU), is a private, state-recognized university based in Frankfurt am Main, Germany. Founded in 2021 by entrepreneurs Christian Rebernik and Thomas Funke as a remote institution focused on sustainability, entrepreneurship, and technology.

The university offers undergraduate, graduate, and certificate programs entirely online through a challenge-based learning approach. In 2022, it received state recognition from the Hessian Ministry of Higher Education, Research, Science and the Arts, following evaluation by the Wissenschaftsrat and the program accreditation via the Foundation for International Business Administration Accreditation (FIBAA).

As of 2025, Tomorrow University reports more than 1,000 students from over 60 countries enrolled in programs taught in English and German.

== History ==
Tomorrow University was established in 2021 as a remote-first private institution. It was co-founded by Christian Rebernik, former Chief Technology Officer (CTO) at N26, and Thomas Funke, innovation researcher and co-founder of the TechQuartier startup hub in Frankfurt. The founders aimed to develop a European higher-education model on applied learning, real-world challenges, and sustainability-oriented leadership.

The initiative evolved from an educational technology (edtech) startup and later transitioned into a state-recognized university operating fully online.

In 2023, Tomorrow University secured €9.3 million in Series A funding, bringing total investment to €13.8 million, to support further development of its learning platform and academic programs.

In 2024 ToU launched a Master of Science in Sustainability, Innovation and Technology, developed in collaboration with Fraunhofer AHEAD (the startup incubator of the Fraunhofer Society) and the Technical University of Darmstadt.

== Learning model ==
ToU's pedagogy combines active learning, digital collaboration, and flexible pacing through a proprietary online platform.

The curriculum is structured around three key principles:

1. Purpose-driven learning. Students connect personal values with academic goals.
2. Community-powered learning. A global network of mentors and peers supports collaborative progress.
3. Hands-on challenges. Applied projects replace traditional exams.

Industry professionals for from companies such as Apple, Google, Tier Mobility, and Delivery Hero have participated as mentors.

Although primarily online, Tomorrow University of Applied Sciences maintains “Action Hubs” in cities including Berlin, Frankfurt, and Vienna for regional networking and workshops.

== Academic programs ==
Tomorrow University offers undergraduate degrees in Responsible Entrepreneurship & Management and AI & Sustainable Technologies.

Graduate programs include Master of Business Administration programs and a Sustainability, Innovation & Technology Master of Science program developed with Fraunhofer AHEAD and TU Darmstadt.

Joint programs include an MBA with OMR Education and an M.Sc. with Le Wagon.

=== Impact Certificates and Micro-Credentials ===
ToU also offers short programs (usually 9 weeks and equivalent to 15 ECTS) in fields such as ESG, innovation, and climate leadership.

== Partnerships ==
Academic partnerships include the WU Executive Academy (Vienna University of Economics and Business), Technical University of Darmstadt, Fraunhofer AHEAD, Le Wagon, and OMR.

According to the university, industry partnerships include Plan A, Kelp Blue, Eintracht Tech, Deutsche Bank, SAP, IBM, Microsoft, and Tesla. (These partnerships vary in scope and are primarily reported by the institution.)

== Organization and governance ==
The university is co-led by founders Christian Rebernik and Thomas Funke, who serve as co-CEOs. A University council oversees academic administration.

== Research ==
Research at ToU focuses on applied, interdisciplinary topics:

- Artificial Intelligence for Sustainability. Exploring human–AI collaboration.
- Sustainable Product Design. Investigating eco-design and responsible innovation.
- Entrepreneurship and Leadership for Sustainability. Analyzing sustainable business and ethical management models.

(Most research descriptions are institutionally sourced; independent assessments of research impact are limited.)

== Notable alumni ==
- Marcel Engelhardt – footballer.
