= Bochum University of Applied Sciences =

Coordinates: 51°26′50″N 7°16′21″E

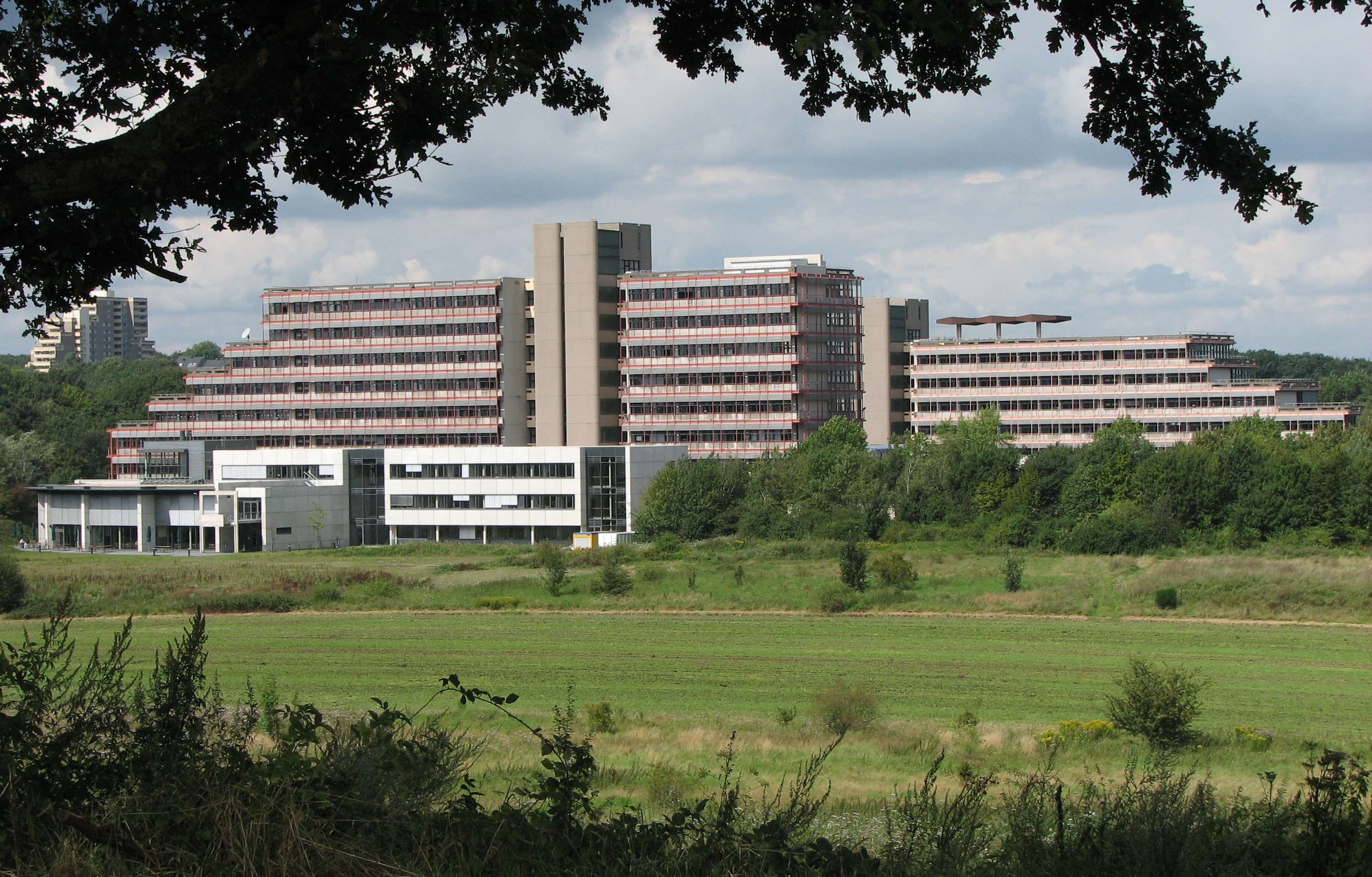
Bochum University of Applied Sciences, view from south

Bochum University of Applied Sciences (German: Hochschule Bochum) is a public university of applied sciences located in Bochum, North Rhine-Westphalia, Germany.

It was established in 1972 following the reorganization of engineering and technical schools in the region. The institution offers bachelor's and master's degree programs in fields such as engineering, business, computer science, and architecture.

It operates two campuses: the main campus in Bochum and a second campus in Velbert/Heiligenhaus. The university is subject to the regulations of the Higher Education Act of North Rhine-Westphalia and is a member of the German Rectors’ Conference.

== History ==
Bochum University of Applied Sciences was established in 1971 as part of the state-wide reorganization of technical and vocational education in North Rhine-Westphalia. The institution emerged from the consolidation of several pre-existing educational establishments, including engineering and business schools. Following its foundation, the university began offering programs in technical and economic disciplines under the framework of a Fachhochschule (university of applied sciences), with a focus on practical and application-oriented education.

In 2009, the university opened a second campus in Velbert/Heiligenhaus to expand its offerings in engineering and to support regional industry cooperation. As of 2024, the university continues to operate across both campuses and remains subject to the legal framework of the Higher Education Act of North Rhine-Westphalia.

== Study ==
Bochum University of Applied Sciences (Hochschule Bochum) offers accredited undergraduate and postgraduate degree programs in applied sciences. The university is organized into several faculties, including those for Architecture, Civil and Environmental Engineering, Electrical Engineering and Computer Science, Geodesy, Mechatronics and Mechanical Engineering, Business, and Health.

=== Undergraduate Programs ===
The university offers bachelor's degree programs in the following subject areas:

- Architecture
- Civil Engineering
- Mechanical Engineering
- Electrical Engineering
- Applied Computer Science
- Mechatronics
- Geoinformatics and Surveying
- Business Administration
- International Business and Management
- Health Sciences (including Nursing, Physiotherapy, Occupational Therapy, Speech and Language Therapy, and Midwifery)

Bachelor's programs typically lead to the degrees Bachelor of Science (B.Sc.), Bachelor of Arts (B.A.), or Bachelor of Engineering (B.Eng.), depending on the field. Most programs are taught in German. Some are available in a dual study format, combining academic study with practical training in cooperation with external institutions.

=== Postgraduate Programs ===
At the master's level, Bochum University of Applied Sciences offers programs in disciplines such as:

- Architecture and Architecture Media Management
- Civil and Environmental Engineering
- Mechanical and Electrical Engineering
- Mechatronics
- Computer Science
- Geodesy
- International Management
- Accounting and Taxation
- Health and Therapy Sciences

These programs typically confer the degrees Master of Science (M.Sc.), Master of Engineering (M.Eng.), Master of Arts (M.A.), or Master of Laws (LL.M.). A limited number of postgraduate programs are available in English.

== Locations ==
Bochum University of Applied Sciences operates two campuses in North Rhine-Westphalia:

- Bochum Campus: The main campus is located in the Querenburg district of Bochum. It accommodates the central administration and the majority of the university's faculties and study programs. The campus is situated near other higher education institutions, including Ruhr University Bochum.
- Velbert/Heiligenhaus Campus: Opened in 2009, this campus is located in Heiligenhaus and offers programs primarily in engineering and computer science. It serves students from the surrounding region and includes options for both full-time and cooperative (dual) study formats.

The university's campus infrastructure includes teaching facilities, laboratories, and administrative buildings distributed across both sites.

== Research ==
Key research areas include:

- Engineering and Technology: Research projects are undertaken in fields such as mechanical engineering, mechatronics, civil engineering, and electrical engineering, with applications in automation, mobility systems, and building technologies.
- Computer Science and Data Science: Areas of focus include applied artificial intelligence, software development, and information systems. These activities are supported by the Interdisciplinary Institute for Applied Artificial Intelligence and Data Science Ruhr (AKIS), which coordinates research across multiple departments.
- Sustainability and Environmental Studies: The university engages in projects concerning water and energy management, climate adaptation, and sustainable infrastructure.
- Economics and Management: Research is carried out on topics related to business informatics, accounting, digital transformation, and organizational development.

Research is supported through external funding, including public research grants and collaborative projects with institutions and companies. The university also participates in coordinated initiatives such as the THALESruhr project, which involves several higher education institutions in the Ruhr area.
