= Bad Liebenzell =

- Town
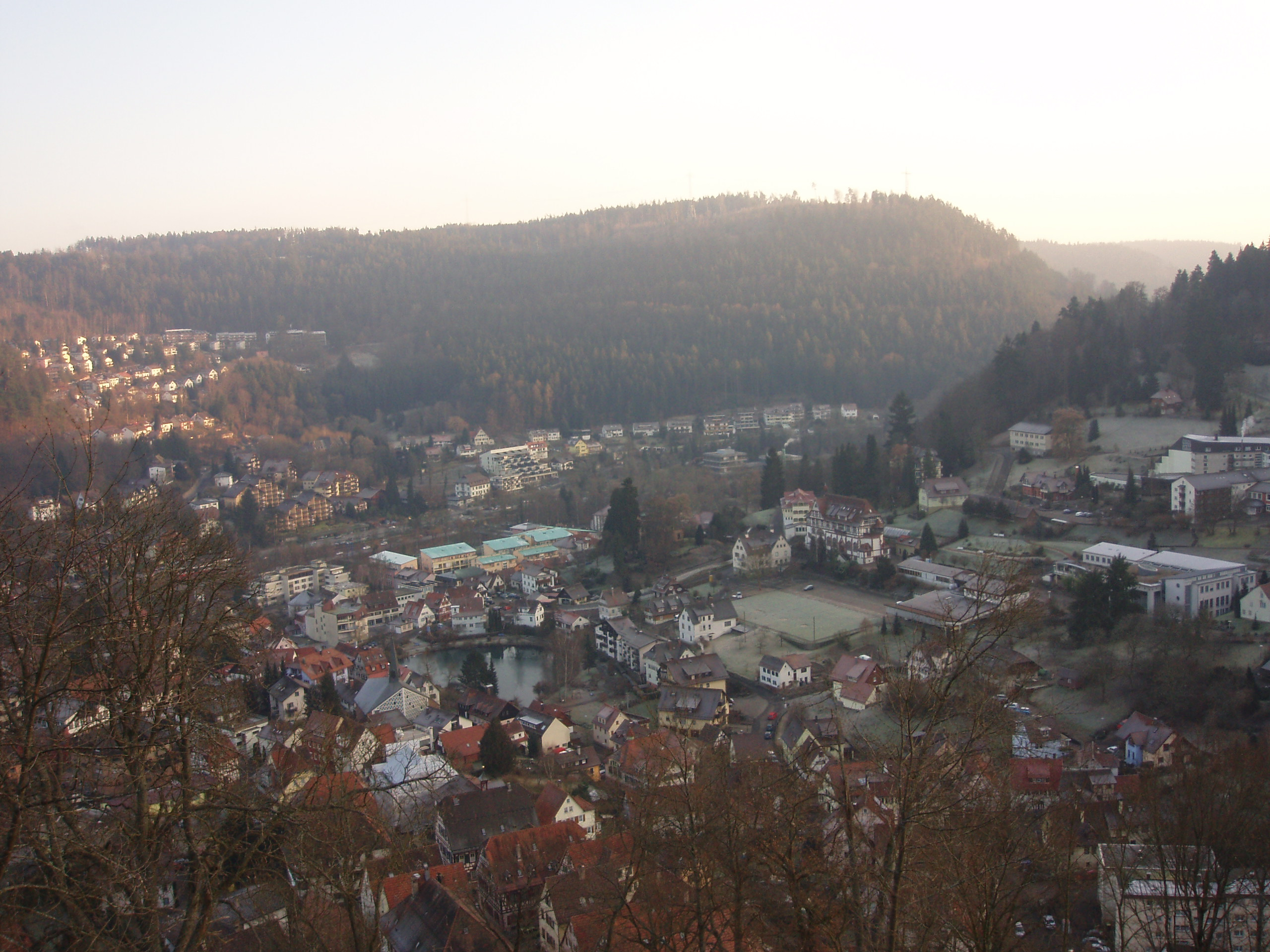
- View over the town from Liebenzell Castle

- Coat of arms

- Location of Bad Liebenzell within Calw district
- Interactive map of Bad Liebenzell
- Location within Germany Location within Baden-Württemberg
- Coordinates: 48°46′27″N 08°43′53″E
- Country: Germany
- State: Baden-Württemberg
- Admin. region: Karlsruhe
- District: Calw
- Subdivisions: 7 Ortsteile

Government
  - Mayor (2021–29): Roberto Chiari (Ind.)

Area
  - Total: 33.78 km^{2} (13.04 sq mi)
- Elevation: 333 m (1,093 ft)

Population (2025-12-31)
  - Total: 9,215
  - Density: 272.8/km^{2} (706.5/sq mi)
- Time zone: UTC+01:00 (CET)
  - Summer (DST): UTC+02:00 (CEST)
- Postal codes: 75378
- Dialling codes: 07052 07084 Maisenbach-Zainen
- Vehicle registration: CW
- Website: www.bad-liebenzell.de

Bad Liebenzell (German: [baːt ˌliːbm̩ˈtsɛl]; Swabian: Bad Liabazell) is a spa town in the Nagold River valley, the northern part of the Black Forest. It was first mentioned in 1090 and is the heart of the Liebenzeller Mission (a religious movement).

Bad Liebenzell is part of the Calw district; it in turn comprises seven sub-districts besides the town itself: Möttlingen, Unterhaugstett, Monakam, Beinberg, Unterlengenhardt und Maisenbach-Zainen. Bad Liebenzell has also had an alliance with Villaines-la-Juhel in France since 1992.

== Geography ==
Bad Liebenzell lies to the West of the Centre of Baden-Württemberg in Nagold. The village has an elevation of 310 (Monbachtal) to 687 Metern (Gemarkung Maisenbach-Zainen) and is part of the Nature Park Schwarzwald Mitte/Nord. The City Bad Liebenzell include the former Municipalities Möttlingen, Möttlingen, Beinberg, Maisenbach, Monakam, Unterhaugstett and Unterlengenhardt. To Bad Liebenzell in the borders of 1970, also belonged next to the city the houses Monbachtal and Maisenbacher Sägemühle. Only the eponymous villages belonged to the former municipalities of Unterlengenhardt, Beinberg, Monakam and Unterhaugstett. To the village of Gemeinde Maisenbach belong also Dorf Maisenbach and Siedlung Zainen. The Siedlung Möttlingen and Gehöft Georgenau belonged to the former municipality Möttlingen. The former municipalities are localities within the meaning of the Baden-Württemberg municipal code with their own Town Council and Mayor as its Chairman.

== Politics ==
=== Local council ===
Elections in May 2014:

- CDU: 9 seats (− 3)
- SPD: 5 seats (± 0)
- Offene Liste (Open list): 7 seats (+ 2)
- DIE Liste & Alliance 90/The Greens: 3 seats (+ 3)
- Total: 24 seats (+2)

=== Coat of arms and flag ===
In blue under a black deer bar in a silver tent of black and gold antler floor-standing is a golden bathtub, in which a seated man to see. The bad Liebenzell town's colours are blue and white.

== Economy and infrastructure ==
Bad Liebenzell is on the Nagoldtalbahn, a railway line from Pforzheim to Horb am Neckar on the nationwide route network.

Bad Liebenzell also has at its disposal a Grundschule (primary school), Hauptschule (secondary school), Realschule, and Förderschule. There is a primary school outside the town in the Möttlingen and Unterhaugstett districts.

The Bad Liebenzell Theological Seminary was founded in 1902 as a private instituation of the Liebenzell Mission, today known as IHL - Internationale Hochschule Liebenzell (www.IHL.eu), a private University College and Theological Seminary accredited by the federal Wissenschaftsrat (Science Council), the state of Baden-Württemberg and ACQUIN. It closely cooperates with Middlesex University London, the ETH Tabor, Marburg, the CVJM (YMCA) University of applied sciences in Kassel.

== Culture and sights ==
Bad Liebenzell lies on the Ostweg (east way), a trail from Pforzheim to Schaffhausen, on which one can find many sights, including:

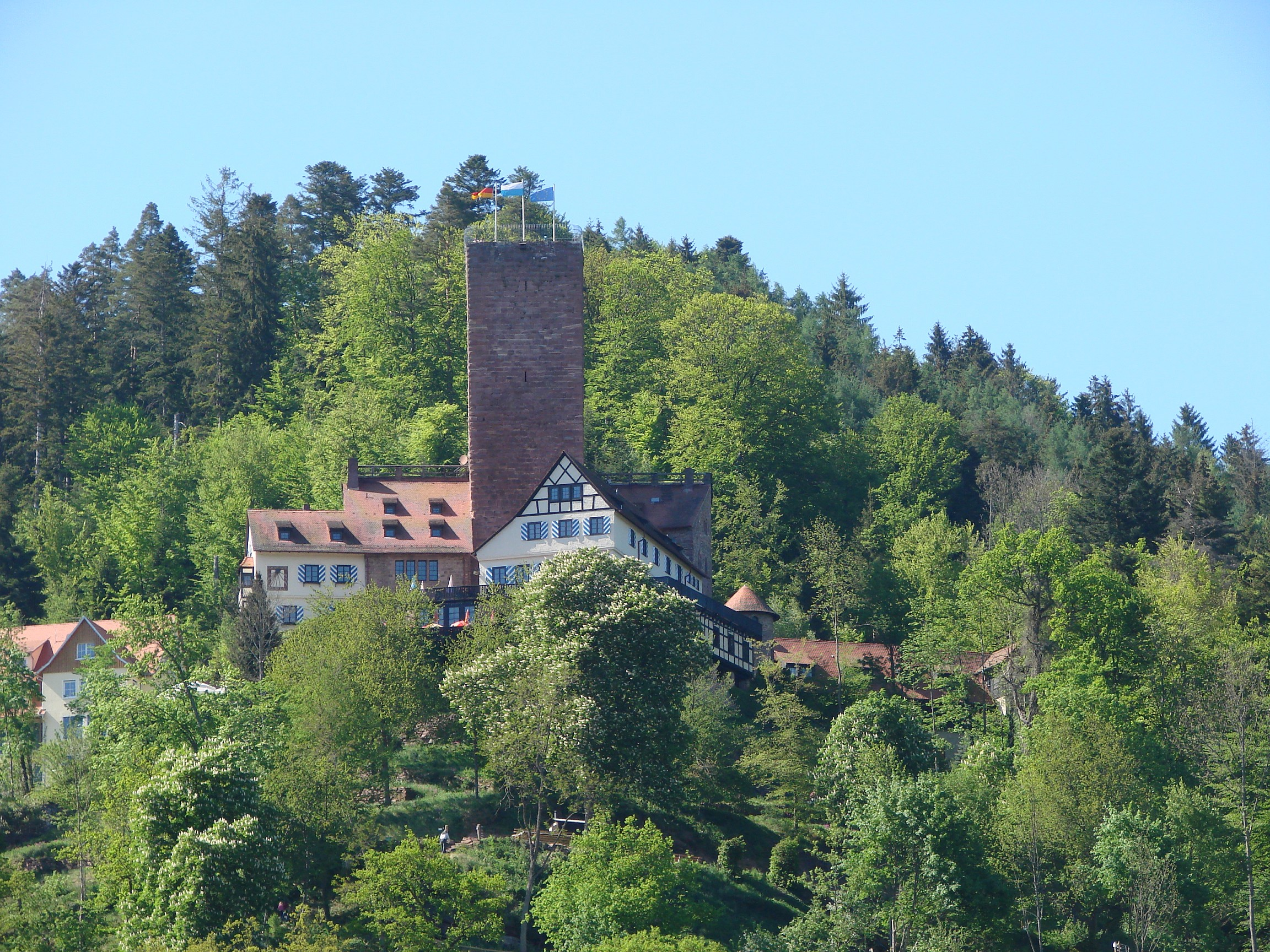
Stauferburg

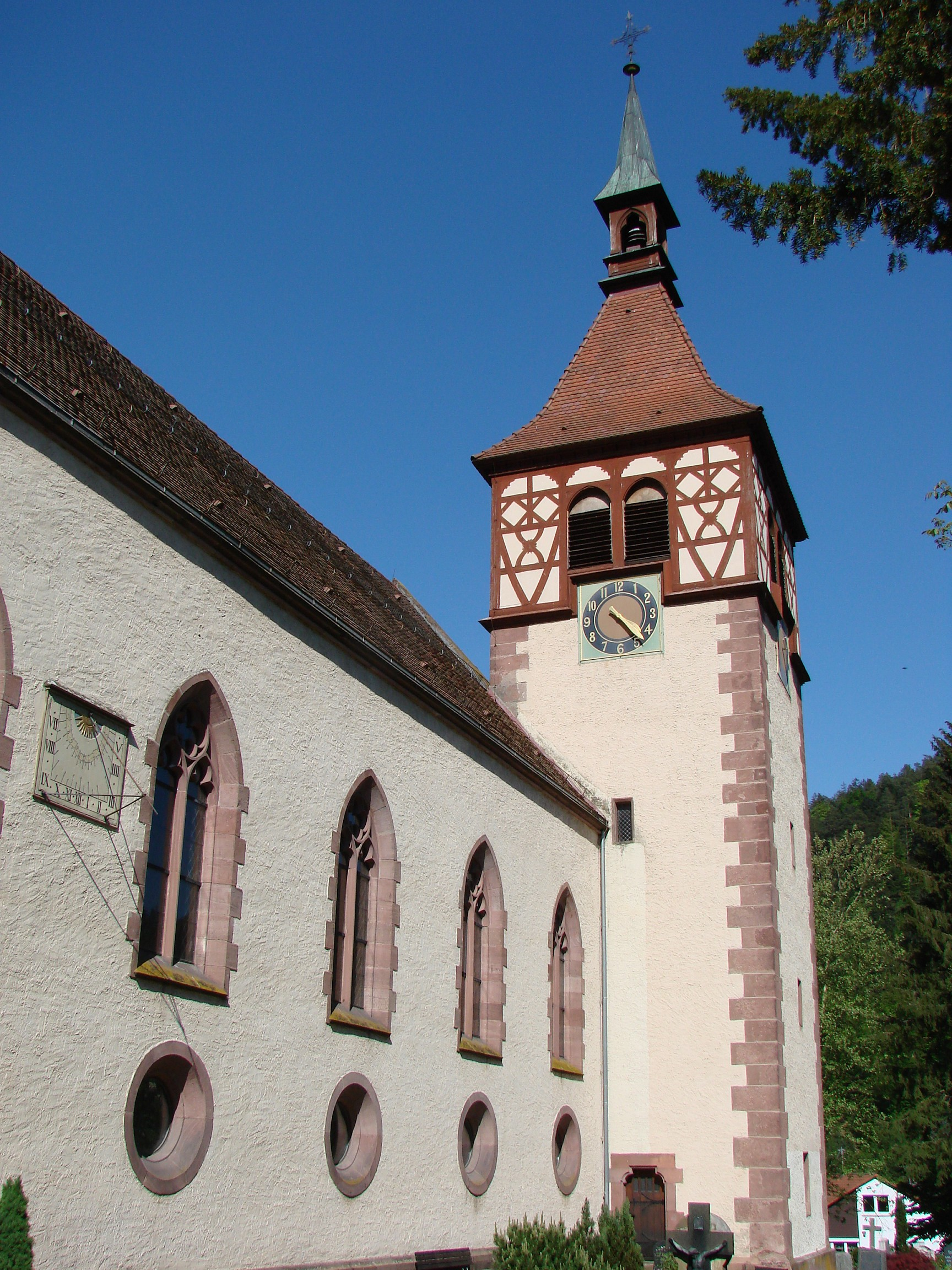
Kirche St. Blasius

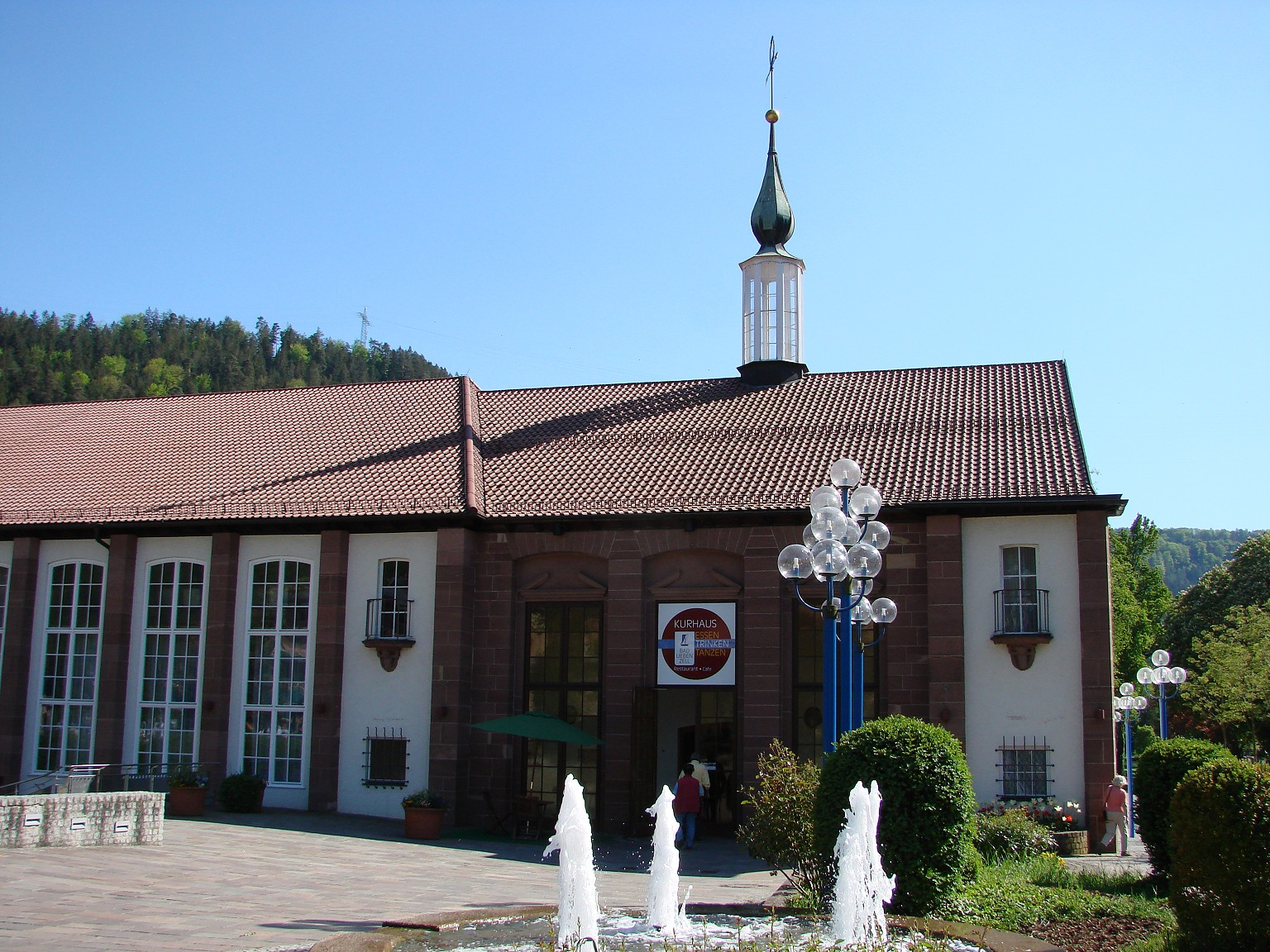
Kurhaus

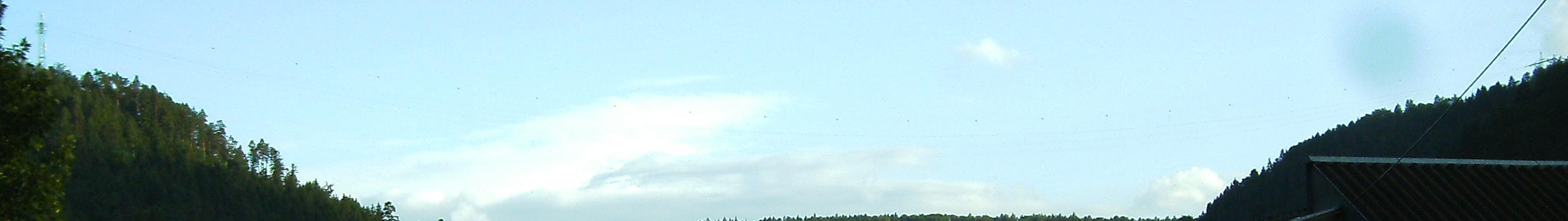
Nagold Valley 110 kV power cable crossing of Merklingen−Calmbach

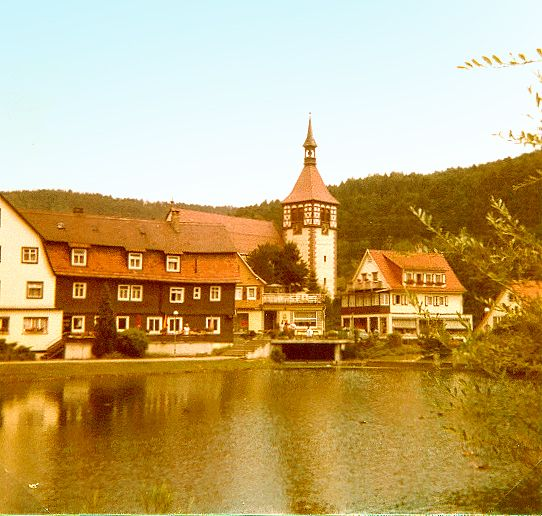
Bad Liebenzell

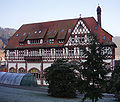
Bad Liebenzell Mission

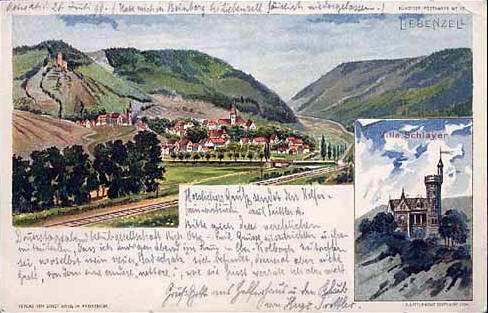
Liebenzell in 1899
- The Stauferburg from the 13th century is the most impressive building in Bad Liebenzell.
- Monaturm (a mobile radio tower at 8°44'09" E, 48°47'18" N)
- South of Bad Liebenzell, a 110kV-three phase powerline of the EnBW spans the Nagold river valley for 941 metres.
- Mission are two remarkable buildings on the mountain of the Liebenzell: the Missionshaus, a beautiful half-timbered House was built in the years 1905 to 1907 in the shape of a cross; a small chapel and the Schleyer Castle and the Schleyer Castle (Schleyerburg), which is below the mission House.

== Notable people ==
- 1842, 1 June, Christoph Blumhardt (in Möttlingen), † 2 August 1919 in Jebenhausen, German theologian and politician (SPD), MdL (Württemberg)
- Johann Blumhardt (1805–1880) worked in Möttlingen
- Bernhard Buttersack (1858–1925), painter
- Tomas Kurth (*1955), artist, lived and worked in Bad Liebenzell-Monakam in the 1970s.
