= Karina Wächter =

German politician (born 1990)

Member of the Landtag of Rhineland-Palatinate
- Incumbent
- Assumed office 1 September 2020
- Preceded by: Alexander Licht
- Constituency: Bernkastel-Kues/Morbach/Kirchberg (Hunsrück)

Personal details
- Born: 30 October 1990 (age 35) Traben-Trarbach
- Party: Christian Democratic Union (since 2007)

Karina Wächter (born 30 October 1990 in Traben-Trarbach) is a German politician serving as a member of the Landtag of Rhineland-Palatinate since 2020. She has served as chairwoman of the Christian Democratic Union in Bernkastel-Kues since 2020.
