= MSB Medical School Berlin =

University in Berlin, Germany

- MSB Medical School Berlin - Hochschule für Gesundheit und Medizin
- Type: Private research university
- Established: 2012; 14 years ago
- Accreditation: AHPGS
- Faculty: 147
- Students: 2,400
- Location: Berlin, Germany
- Website: www.medicalschool-berlin.de

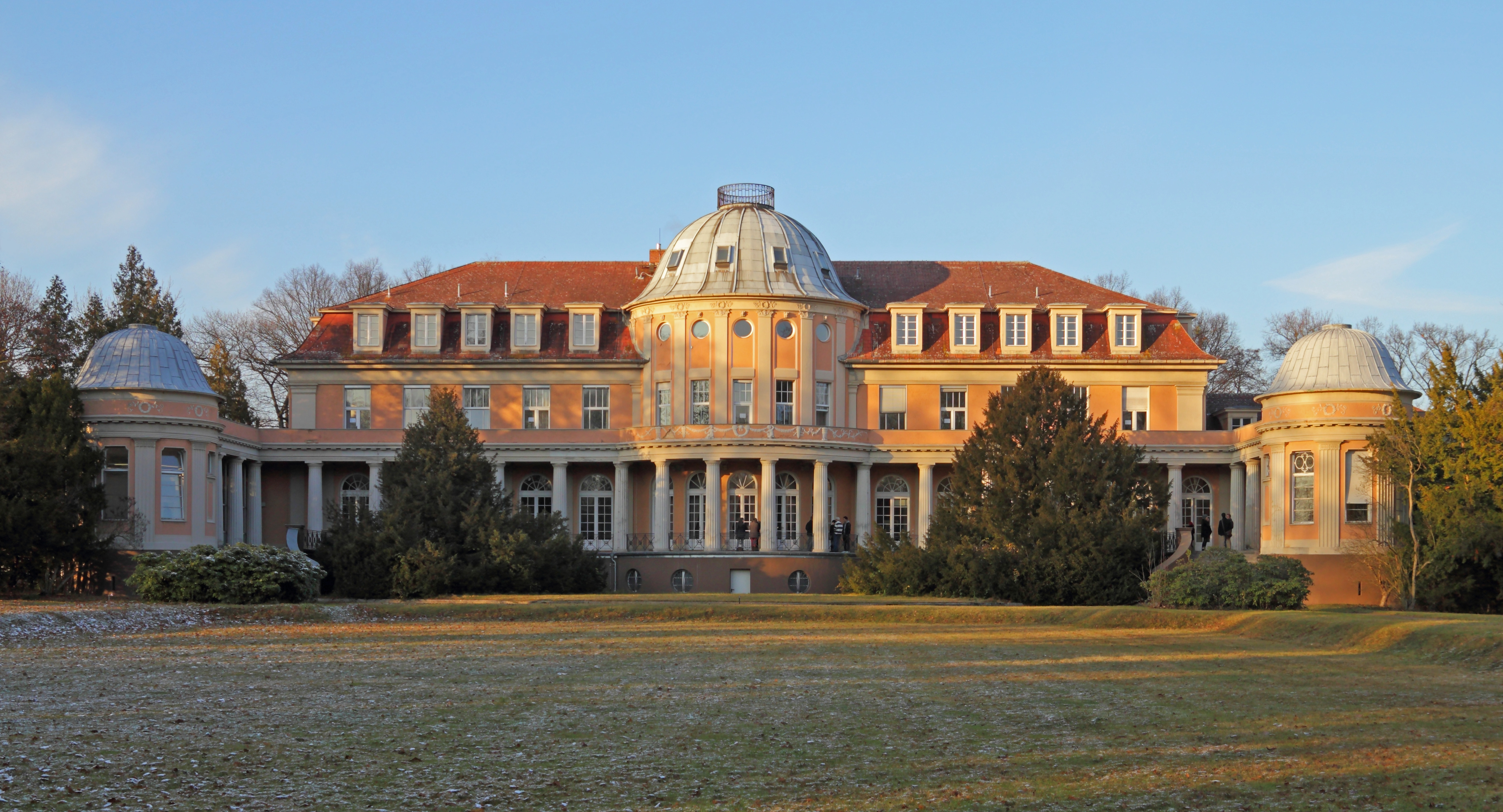
Head office and administrative headquarters of the MSB Medical School Berlin: the former Siemens villa in Berlin-Lankwitz

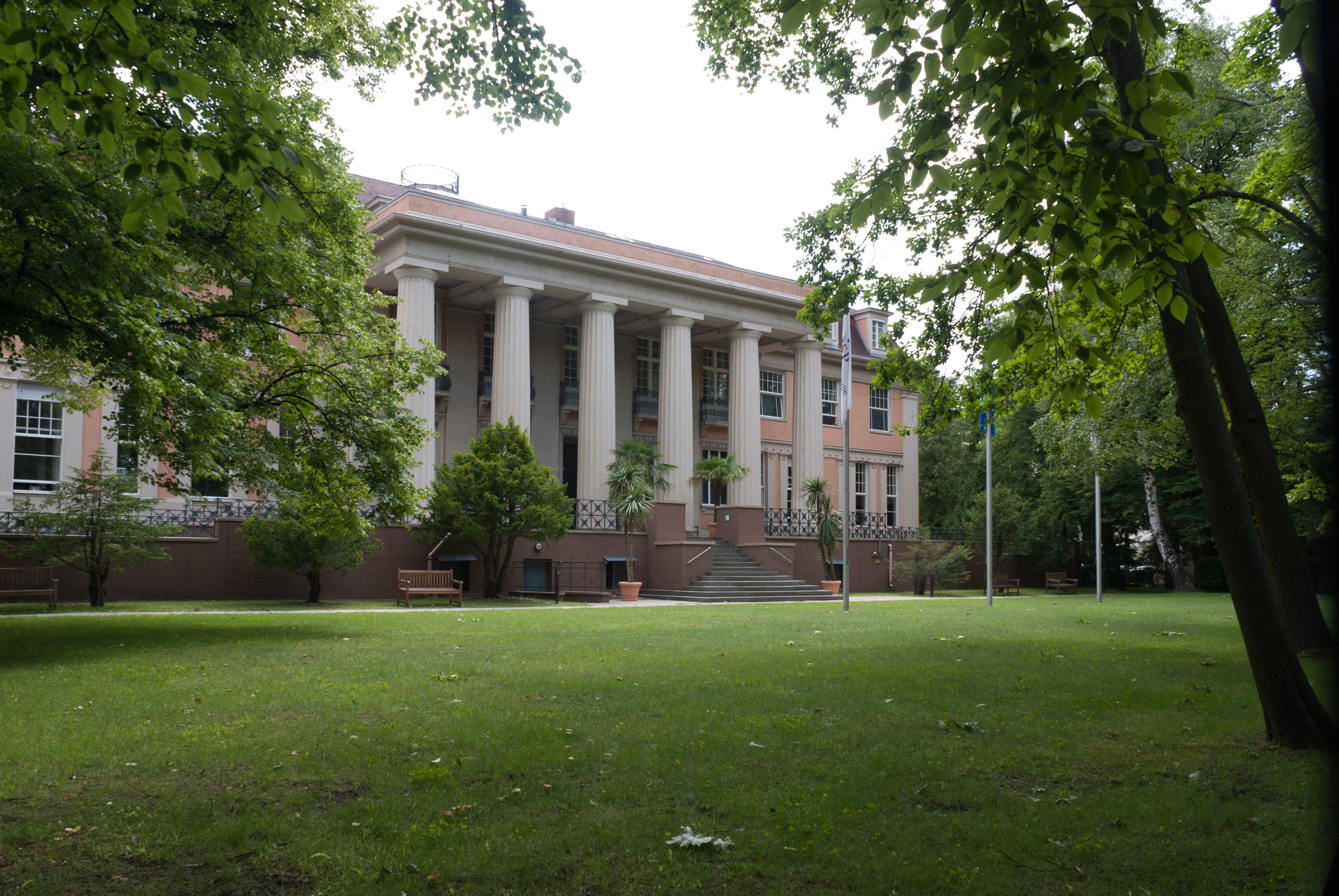
Entrance portal of the MSB in Lankwitz (“Siemens Villa”)

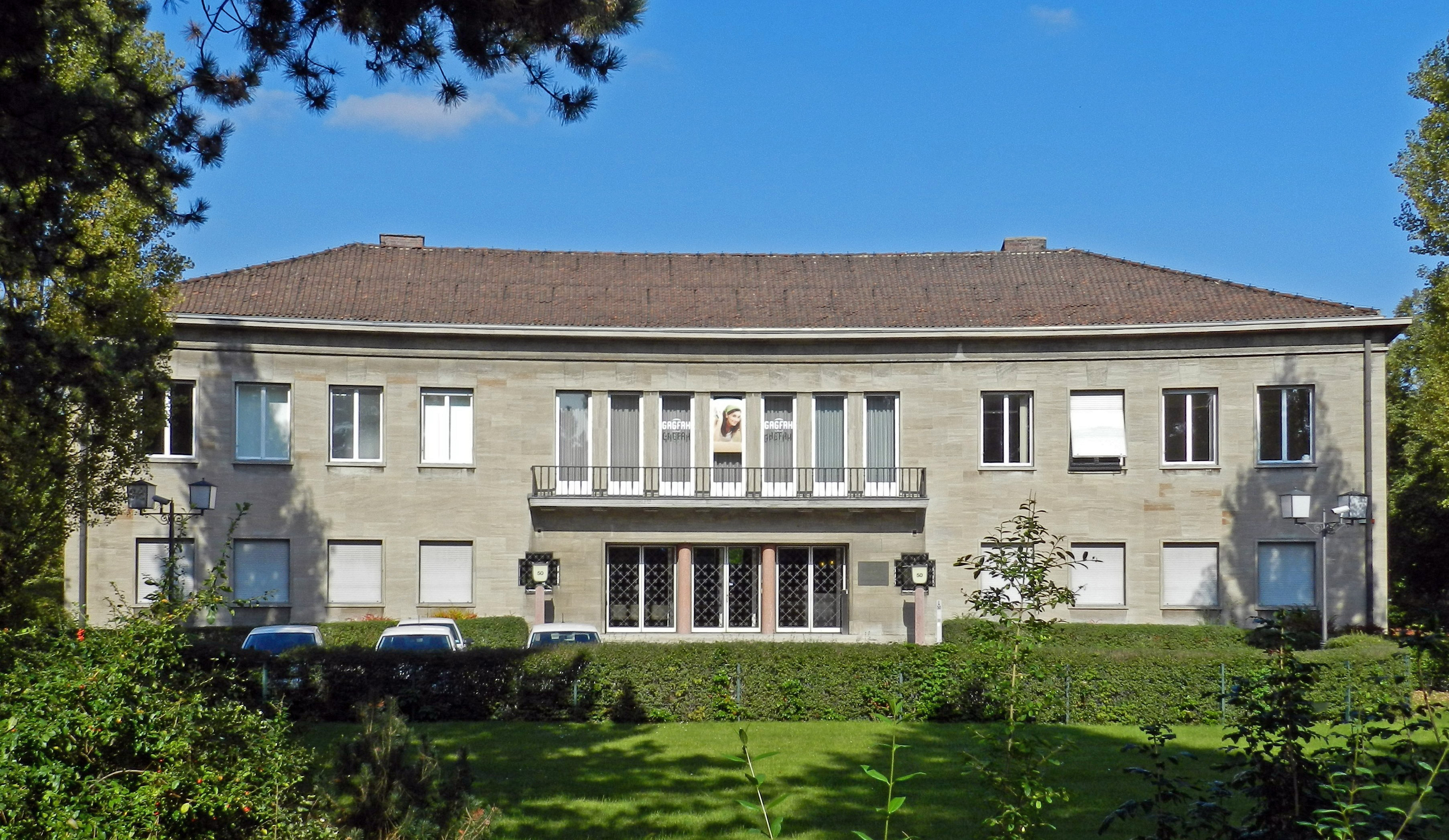
Location of the MSB in Rüdesheimer Straße

MSB Medical School Berlin - Hochschule für Gesundheit und Medizin is a German private, state-recognized university founded in Berlin in 2012. MSB Medical School Berlin is part of a university network with BSP Business School Berlin (located in Hamburg's Hafencity) and MSH Medical School Hamburg.

MSB offers degree programs at two different faculties. Students at MSB can choose between an application-oriented university of applied sciences course (courses offered by the Faculty of Health Sciences) or a university course (courses offered by the Faculty of Natural Sciences) and plan their career according to their strengths and talents. The MSB sees a selling point in its study programs, which all offer a professional perspective with Bachelor's, Master's and further qualifications up to licensure after training as a psychological psychotherapist.

== Curriculum ==
=== State examination ===
Faculty of Natural Sciences (university studies):

- Human medicine (state examination): Full-time

=== Bachelor's degree programs ===
Faculty of Health Sciences (university degree program):

- Advanced Nursing Practice (Bachelor of Science): Part-time
- Curative Education (Bachelor of Arts): Full-time
- Therapeutic Education, Focus on Counseling and Family (Bachelor of Arts): Full-time
- Physician Assistant (Bachelor of Science): Full-time and part-time
- Medical Controlling and Management (Bachelor of Science): Full-time
- Social Work (Bachelor of Arts): Full-time
- Social Work, Focus on Counseling and Family (Bachelor of Arts): Full-time
- Early Help and Early Intervention (Bachelor of Arts): Full-time
- Medical Education (Bachelor of Arts): Part-time

Faculty of Natural Sciences (university degree course):

- Psychology (Bachelor of Science): Full-time

=== Master's degree programs ===
Faculty of Health Sciences (University of Applied Sciences):

- Social Work (Master of Arts): Full-time
- Clinical Research (Master of Science): Full-time and part-time
- Digital Health Management (Master of Science): Full-time and part-time
- Sexology (Master of Arts): Full-time

Faculty of Natural Sciences (university degree program):

- Psychology with a focus on Clinical Psychology and Psychotherapy (Master of Science): Full-time
- Psychology with a focus on legal psychology (Master of Science): Full-time
- Work and Organizational Psychology (Master of Science): Full-time
- Psychotherapy (Master of Science): Full-time
- Medical Education (Master of Arts): Part-time

== Educational accreditation ==
The degree programs are accredited by the Akkreditierungsagentur für Studiengänge im Bereich Gesundheit und Soziales (AHPGS). The degree programs offered at MSB do not have a numerus clausus.
