= Munich University of Applied Languages =

Coordinates: 48°09′03″N 11°34′43″E

Internationale Hochschule SDI München
- Type: Private
- Established: 2006
- President: Prof. Dr. Claudia Brunner [ad interim]
- Location: Munich, Bavaria, Germany
- Website: www.sdi-muenchen.de/en/hochschule/

The International University SDI Munich (German: Internationale Hochschule SDI München) is a private, state-recognized university of applied sciences based in Munich. Its legal form is that of a non-profit limited liability company (gGmbH). The responsible body is the Sprachen & Dolmetscher Institut München, whose legal form is a registered association.

== History ==
On December 13, 2006, the Bavarian State Ministry of Science, Research and the Arts approved the establishment of the university - at that time still under the name "Hochschule für Angewandte Sprachen". The university was established on July 1, 2007 and began teaching in the 2007/2008 winter semester. In January 2020, the name was changed to "Internationale Hochschule SDI München - University of Applied Sciences." The university is affiliated with the Sprachen & Dolmetscher Institut München, which has been providing training for translators, interpreters, foreign language correspondents and Eurocorrespondents since 1952. The current president is Prof. Dr. Claudia Brunner (ad interim).

== Courses ==
Since the 2019/20 winter semester, the university has been offering 14 state-recognized Bachelor's and Master's degree courses in business, communication, user experience, media and language:

Bachelor of Arts

- Information Architecture and Content Creation (B.A.)
- Intercultural Interaction Design (B.A.)
- International Communication and Business (B.A.)
- Modern Chinese Studies (B.A.)
- Chinese Translation (B.A.)

Master of Arts

- Intercultural Communication (M.A.)
- Digital Media Manager (M.A.)
- International Sales Management (M.A.)
- Interpreting (M.A.)
- Conference Interpreting - German-Chinese Double Degree (M.A.) (in cooperation with Beijing Foreign Studies University)
- International Master in Translation (M.A.)
- Post-Editing & Quality Management (M.A.)
- Translation Management - dual study program (M.A.)
- Máster Internacional para Profesores de Español como Lengua Extranjera (MA ELE)
