= Cusanus Hochschule =

Private university

Coordinates: 50.3616°N 7.5979°E

Hochschule für Gesellschaftsgestaltung
- Established: 26 May 2015
- Rector: Prof. Dr. Silja Graupe
- Location: Koblenz, Rhineland-Palatinate, Germany
- Website: hfgg.de

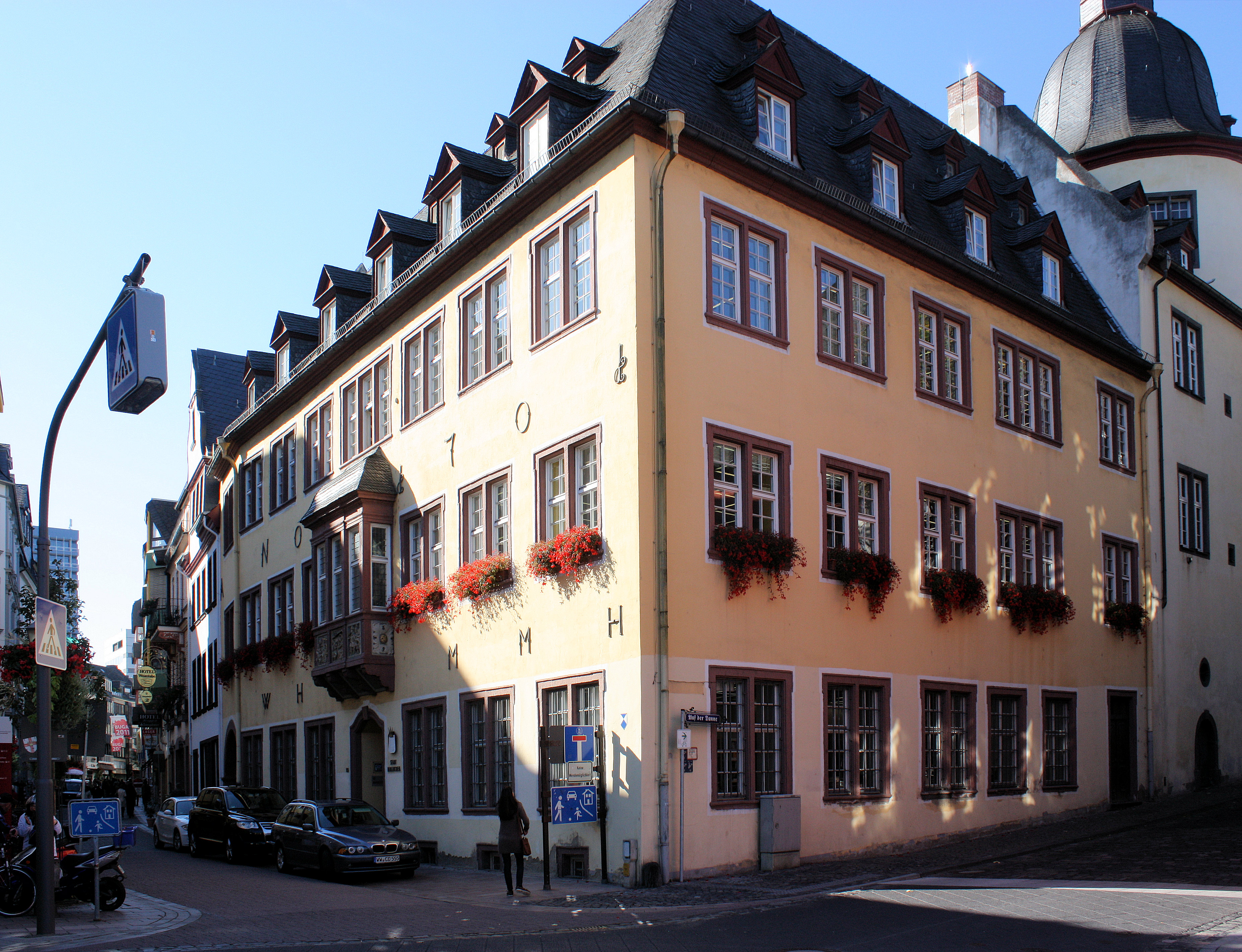
The university's main building is the Dreikönigenhaus in the old town of Koblenz

Hochschule für Gesellschaftsgestaltung (HfGG; formerly "Cusanus Hochschule") is a private non-profit university situated in Koblenz, a city in Germany at Moselle and Rhine.

A core of the HfGG is social criticism and criticism of the current economic system. In doing so, the HfGG aims at a reform of economic and sociological aspects without naming a common political philosophy basis.

While officially recognised in May 2015 as one of nine universities in the German state of Rhineland-Palatinate, it was founded in February 2014 by a group of academics, students and citizens. One of the institutions involved in the founding of Cusanus Hochschule has been the Kues Academy for the History of European Thought (Kueser Akademie für Europaeische Geistesgeschichte). Hochschule für Gesellschaftsgestaltung remains independent of economic, political and religious interests. Hence, it is not affiliated with any religious denomination.

== History ==
The idea for the foundation of Cusanus Hochschule initially developed at Kues Academy for the History of European Thought, a network of about 120 academics from the fields of philosophy, economy, the natural sciences, engineering and history. On 12 February 2014 more than 20 academics, politicians and entrepreneurs, together with Kues Academy, endowed Cusanus Hochschule to make it eligible as an officially recognised institution of higher learning. The founding presidium consisted of Harald Spehl (president, professor emeritus Trier University), Silja Graupe (vice-president, professor of economy and philosophy Cusanus Hochschule), Harald Schwaetzer (vice-president) and Frank Vierheilig (managing director of Cusanus Treuhand gGmbH, chancellor of Cusanus Hochschule). The patron saint of Cusanus Hochschule was Nicholas of Cusa, a German philosopher, theologian, jurist and astronomer, who is considered as one of the first German proponents of Renaissance humanism.

In October 2014, Cusanus Hochschule moved into its new premises, the Renaissance town hall of Bernkastel. Two months later, in December 2014, four courses of study were officially accredited, while the accrediting agency especially praised their high societal relevance. In May 2015, Cusanus Hochschule's academic licence was granted by the Ministry of Science for Rhineland-Palatinate. The university was officially inaugurated on 26 May 2015. As of 2019 under the new presidency of Reinhard Loske, Cusanus Hochschule focusses entirely on new economic thinking and practice, while maintaining its philosophical inspiration and humanistic ambitions.

With the reorientation of the university's content, the Ministry of Science, Continuing Education and Culture of the state of Rhineland-Palatinate announced on April 8, 2020, that the state recognition of the university would be extended until the end of 2024.

On October 1, 2021, the Cusanus University for Social Design relocated from Bernkastel-Kues to Koblenz, where it began teaching and administrative operations in the Dreikönigenhaus.

Silja Graupe, Professor of Economics and Philosophy and co-founder of the university, has been President of the university since October 1, 2021.

With a further name change to the Hochschule für Gesellschaftsgestaltung in April 2023, the university will finally shed its name link to Nicholas of Cusa. The area of higher education, which is referred to as transfer or third mission, is anchored in the university's new name as a claim to shape and design society.

== Programs ==
Hochschule für Gesellschaftsgestaltung offers two master programs in the philosophy and history of economics („System and Mindset Change“, „Institutional Innovations and Purposes“) and a corresponding bachelor's degree („Economic Change and Sustainability“).

All courses are meant to broaden the scope of knowledge on economy, culture and society, basically like general studies in humanities. HfGG is aiming to engage students to take part in a reflexive and responsible transformation of both economy and society in the direction of the general values, the university advocating for. The university used to offer courses in philosophy. All degrees include modules that aim to the personal development of the student and wants to make him or her aware of the student cultural and social context. The majority of courses are taught in block seminars, which enables students to work while studying or in HfGG-term to "uphold commitments in his or her home communitie".

== Finance ==
Hochschule für Gesellschaftsgestaltung and Cusanus Treuhand gGmbH are both non-profit organizations ensuring that research and teaching remain independent.

All programs at HfGG are chargeable. Study fees can be offset by grants, and endowments. Donations are the university's only sources of income.

== Student community ==
Students of Hochschule für Gesellschaftsgestaltung founded a non-profit organization in 2014, contributing to the broader context of the university with a wide range of activities such as workshops, fundraising, cultural events and student housing. Students have played a significant role in founding, financing and organizing Hochschule für Gesellschaftsgestaltung.

== Publications ==
Members of Hochschule für Gesellschaftsgestlatung contribute to the following publications:

- Kritische Studien zu Markt und Gesellschaft (edited by Silja Graupe, Jakob Kapeller and Walter Ötsch, Metropolis, Marburg). ISSN 1869-9782
- International Journal of Pluralism and Economics Education (IJPEE), Inderscience, Genf. Member of the editorial board (Silja Graupe)
- Jahrbuch Ökologie, S. Hirzel-Verlag, Co-Editor (Reinhard Loske)
