= Hamm-Lippstadt University of Applied Sciences =

Public research university in North Rhine-Westphalia, Germany

- Hochschule Hamm-Lippstadt
- Motto: Wirklich was bewegen
- Motto in English: Really make a difference
- Type: Public
- Established: May 1, 2009; 17 years ago
- Founder: Landtag of North Rhine-Westphalia
- President: Kira Kastell
- Academic staff: 417 professors 109
- Students: 4.700 WS 2024/25
- Location: Marker Allee 76–78, Hamm, North Rhine-Westphalia, 59063, Germany; 51.6820061°N 7.8412114°E
- Campus: 12.8 acres (5.2 ha) (4.5 acres Lippstadt Campus); Urban
- Colors: Gold, Red
- Website: www.hshl.de

Hamm-Lippstadt University of Applied Sciences is a public university located in North Rhine-Westphalia. It is a applied science University. It was found in 2009, and named after its two locations in Hamm & Lippstadt. This university mainly focused on STEM.

Currently 4700 students are studying at the two locations in 14 bachelor and 10 master's programs.

== History ==
In May 2007, North Rhine-Westphalia's Minister-President Jürgen Rüttgers announced an initiative to counteract the growing shortage of skilled workers, particularly in engineering subjects.

Twenty-two cities, regions, and existing universities of applied sciences applied for the locations of a total of three new universities of applied sciences in North Rhine-Westphalia. The cities of Hamm and Lippstadt submitted a joint application. On November 28, 2008, their application was accepted by cabinet decision. The law came into force with its promulgation on April 21, 2009. On September 21, 2009, courses began at both locations.

In contrast to the traditional division into faculties, Hamm-Lippstadt University of Applied Sciences is organized into departments. This is intended to facilitate interdisciplinary teaching and research.

== Location ==
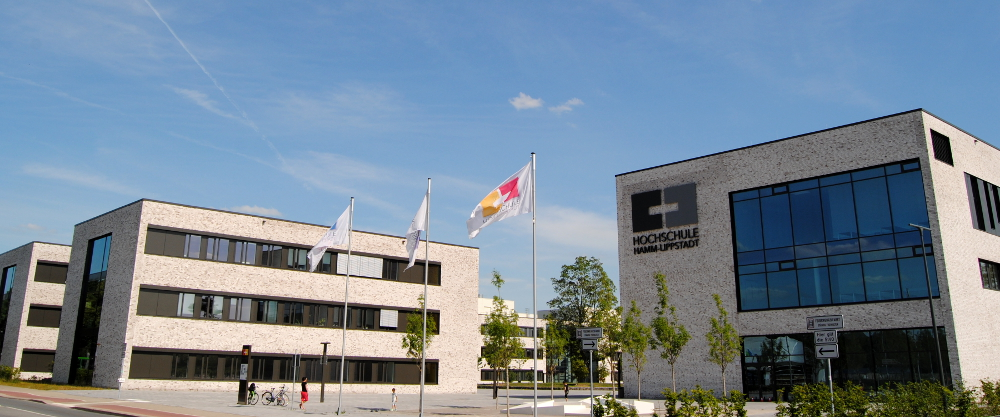
Campus in Hamm

=== Campus in Hamm ===
In Hamm, buildings of the former Paracelsus Barracks of the German Armed Forces were used until the beginning of 2014. Until 1963, the site (then address: Stadthof 18) housed schools including the Hamm-Osten Catholic Elementary School, the Hamm-Osten Community School, the Municipal Secondary School (now the Friedrich Ebert Secondary School), the Mathematical Gymnasium (now the Freiherr-vom-Stein Gymnasium), and the Humanistic Gymnasium (now the Hammonense), as well as the Hermann Fiegener plumbing and heating engineering company. The schoolyard was later converted into a parade ground after the German Armed Forces moved in.Demolition of the old Bundeswehr Hospital began in December 2010. The new university building, with 17,340 m^{2} of usable space, was built on the site on Marker Allee by 2014. Classes began in the first completed buildings in the 2013/14 winter semester. At the end of June 2014, the Hamm campus was officially inaugurated and shortly thereafter received the architecture and design award "Iconic Award".

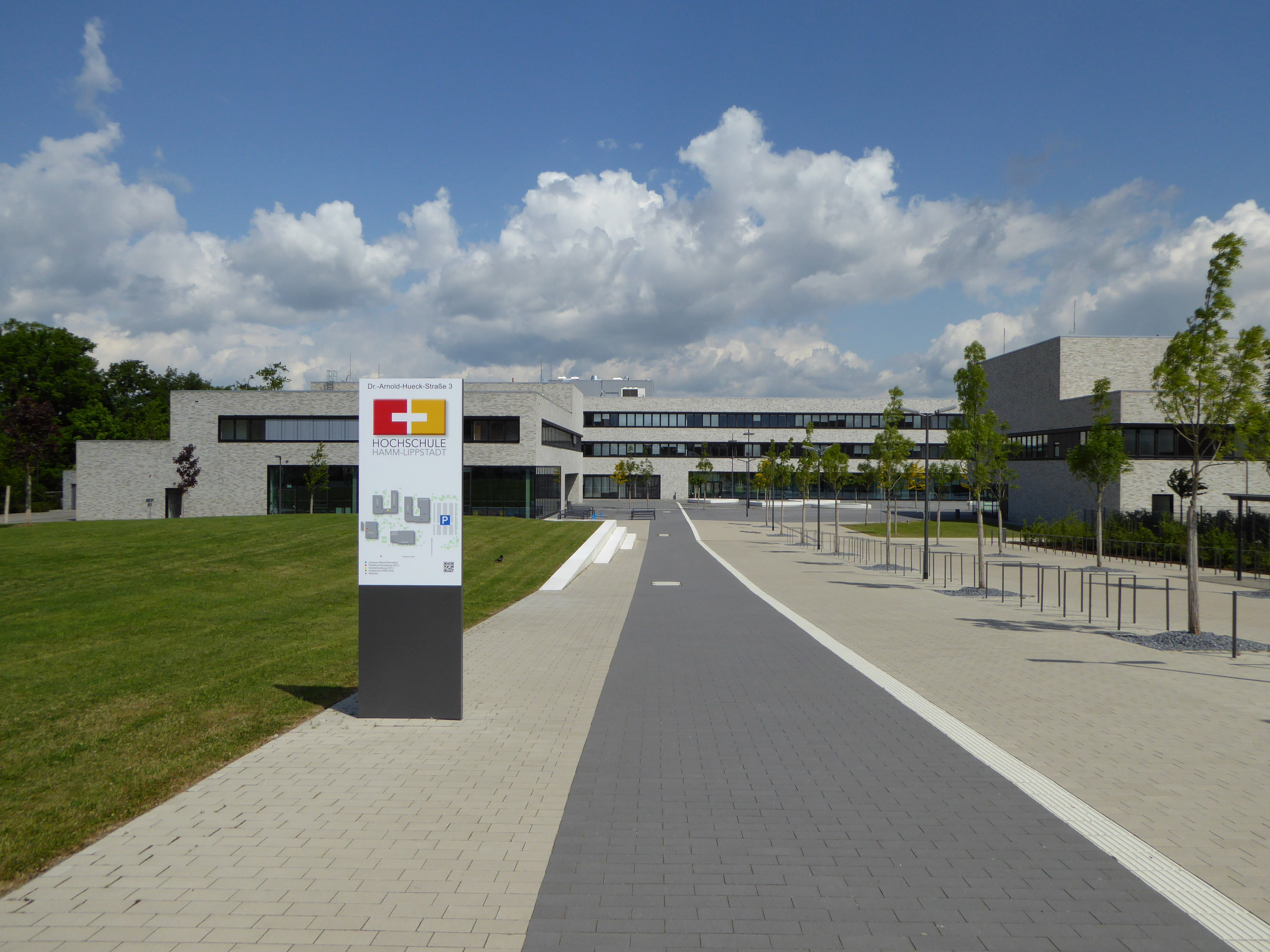
Campus in Lippstadt

=== Campus in Lippstadt ===
In Lippstadt, a similar new building was constructed near the historic city center by spring 2014. The total usable space is 15,910 m^{2}. Until its completion, Hamm-Lippstadt University of Applied Sciences used seminar and lecture rooms at the Cartec on Erwitter Straße, in a Hella KGaA Hueck & Co. building on Lüningstraße, and in a building on Rixbecker Straße

== Study programs ==
The following degree programs are currently offered at the Hamm location:

- Energy technology and resource optimization, Bachelor of Engineering
- Biomedical Technology, Bachelor of Engineering
- Technical Management and Marketing, Bachelor of Science
- Health and Sports Engineering, Bachelor of Engineering
- Intelligent Systems Design, Bachelor of Engineering
- Intercultural Business Psychology, Bachelor of Science
- Environmental Monitoring and Forensic Chemistry, Bachelor of Engineering
- Product and Asset Management, Master of Science
- Applied Biomedical Engineering, Master of Science
- Biomedical Management and Marketing, Master of Science
- Intercultural Business Psychology, Master of Science
- Product Development and Business Studies, Master of Engineering
- Environmental and Hazardous Substances Analysis, Master of Science

The following degree programs are currently offered at the Lippstadt location:

- Mechatronics, Bachelor of Engineering, also as a dual study program
- Industrial Engineering, Bachelor of Engineering
- Computer Visualistics and Design, Bachelor of Science
- Electronic Engineering, Bachelor of Engineering
- Business Administration, Bachelor of Science
- Materials Science and Bionics, Bachelor of Science
- Applied Computer Science and Social Media, Bachelor of Science
- Business and Systems Engineering, Master of Engineering
- Technical Entrepreneurship and Innovation, Master of Science
- Technical Consulting and Management, Master of Science
- Electronic Engineering, Bachelor of Engineering
