= Rhine-Waal University of Applied Sciences =

German higher education institution

Coordinates: 51.7937°N 6.1458°E

- Hochschule Rhein-Waal
- Logo of the university
- Motto: Innovativ, Interdisziplinär, International
- Motto in English: Innovative, Interdisciplinary, International
- Type: Public
- Established: 2009
- President: Oliver Locker-Grütjen
- Academic staff: 251
- Students: 12380 (2025/26)
- Location: Kleve and Kamp-Lintfort, North Rhine-Westphalia, Germany
- Campus: 21.3 acres (8.6 ha) (4.4 acres in Kamp linfort campus); Urban
- Website: www.hochschule-rhein-waal.de/en

Rhine-Waal University of Applied Sciences (German: Hochschule Rhein-Waal) or HSRW, is a 2009-founded German university of applied sciences based in the cities of Kleve and Kamp-Lintfort, Germany.

It is internationally-oriented and delivers a variety of English- and German-language study programmes across four faculties: Technology and Bionics, Life Sciences, Society and Economics, and Communication and Environment.

The university is named after the river Rhine which becomes the Waal after crossing the Dutch border near Kleve.

== History ==
The state government of North Rhine-Westphalia organized a competition for the creation of three new Universities on 28 May 2008. The applicants were Kleve and the "We-4"-cities (Kamp-Lintfort, Moers, Neukirchen and Rheinberg), but the concept of separate universities was discarded. Instead, the two competing candidates Kleve and Kamp-Lintfort were assigned joint responsibility to establish a two-campus university in November 2008. In April 2009, Marie-Louise Klotz and Martin Goch were appointed president and vice president of the university. The official founding date of the university was 1 May 2009.

Marie-Louise Klotz was replaced as president by Heide Naderer in 2015, who was succeeded by Oliver Locker-Grütjen in 2019.

== Internationality ==
As of 2018, 55% of the student body is international, coming from 122 different countries, with the share of international students steadily increasing year by year. Within this group, students from India, Bangladesh, and Pakistan form the largest cohorts.

== Tuition and fees ==
Due to its status as a public university in the state of NRW, no tuition fees are charged. There is a semester contribution fee of €365.10 (as of 2026) to be paid each semester, which covers e.g. social services contribution, and unlimited public transportation within the state. The university offers merit-based scholarships of €3600 per year for outstanding students regardless of origin on an academic year by year basis. In 2017, this was awarded to 80 students.

== Reputation ==
The courses are accredited by AQAS and ASIIN. Recent graduates of the university moved on to become e.g. engineers at BMW and Lufthansa, or went to graduate schools such as University of Melbourne and KTH Royal Institute of Technology.

== Location and campus ==
The two campuses are located on the outskirts of Germany's most populous metropolitan region, the Rhine-Ruhr, which can be reached by the Cologne–Nijmegen railway. The Kleve campus can also be reached directly from Düsseldorf main train station via the RE10 train.
