= Rauheneck Castle (Ebern) =

Ruined castle in Bavaria, Germany

- Burg Rauheneck
- Ebern-Vorbach
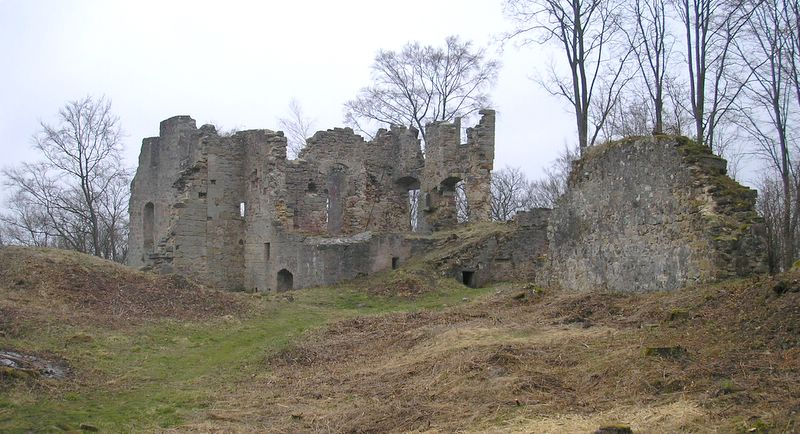
- The palas of Rauheneck Castle

Site information
- Type: hill castle, summit location
- Code: DE-BY
- Condition: ruins

Location
- Coordinates: 50°06′31″N 10°43′55″E
- Height: 428 m above sea level (NN)

Site history
- Built: around 1180

Garrison information
- Occupants: free nobility

Rauheneck Castle (German: Burg Rauheneck) (usual spelling today Raueneck = "forested corner" or "hill spur") is a ruined administrative castle of the Bishopric of Würzburg in the Haßberge in the county of Haßberge, Lower Franconia, Bavaria (Germany). The site, which was badly in need of repair, was closed until 2006 due to the danger of collapse but has been accessible again since the start of, as yet unfinished, emergency repair work.

== Location ==
The ruins of the hill castle lie on a western hill spur of the Haubeberg (428 m above NN), which is situated north of the village of Vorbach, in the west of the former county borough of Ebern. It is surrounded by mixed forest stands of the Haßberge Nature Park.

== History ==
=== Castle ===
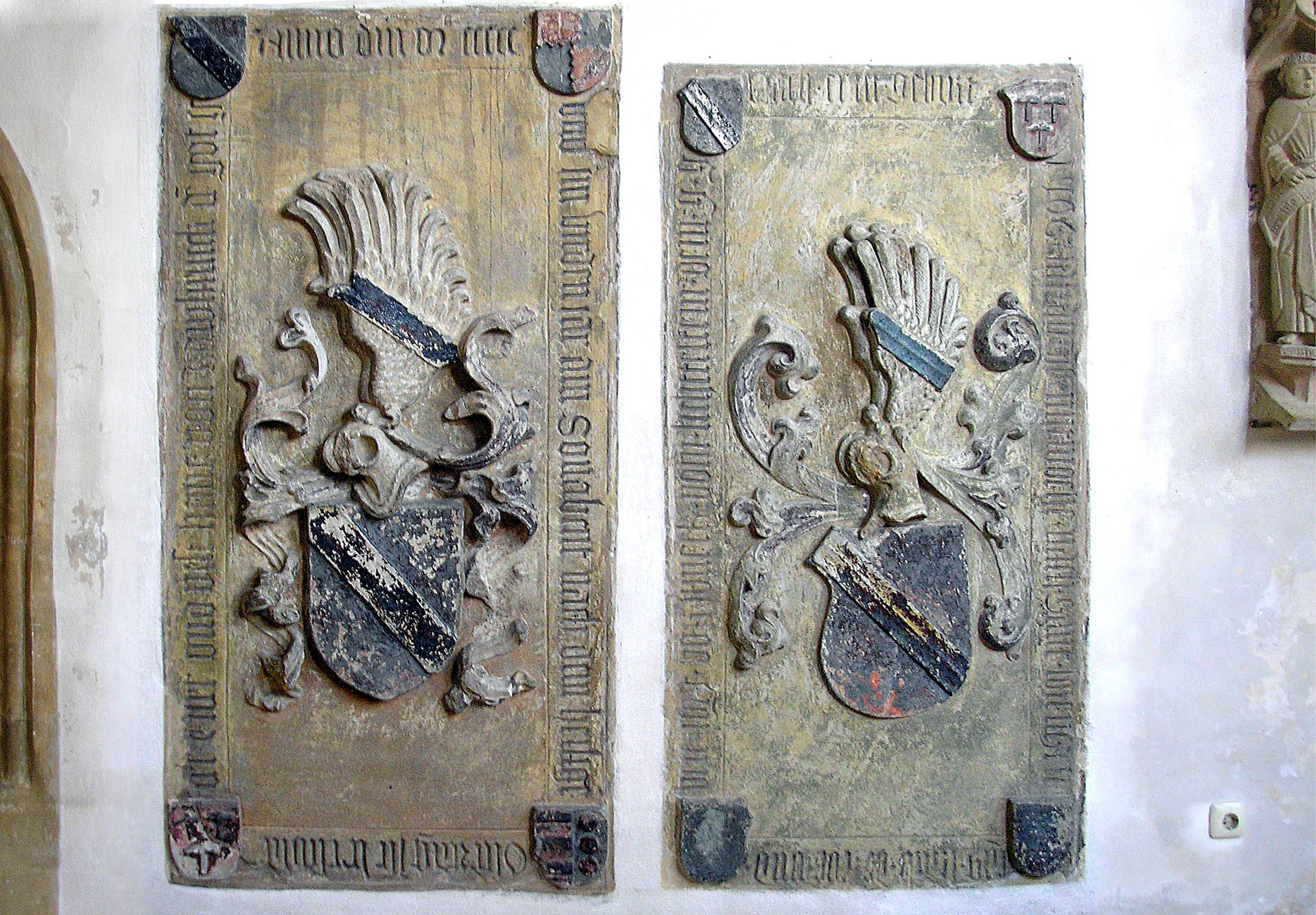
The gravestone of the last Marschalke of Rauheneck in the parish church of St. Kilian at Pfarrweisach

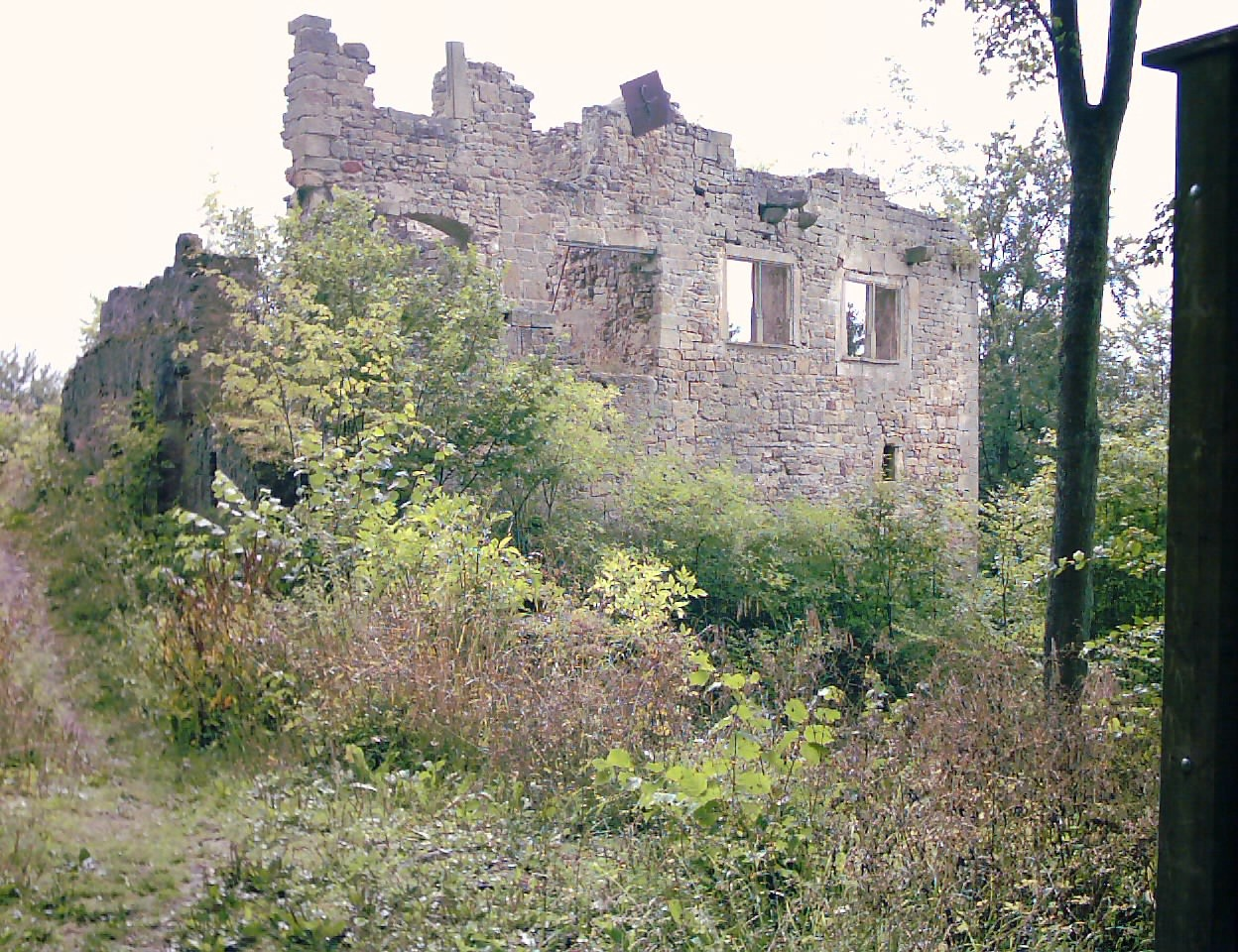
The palas in August 2005

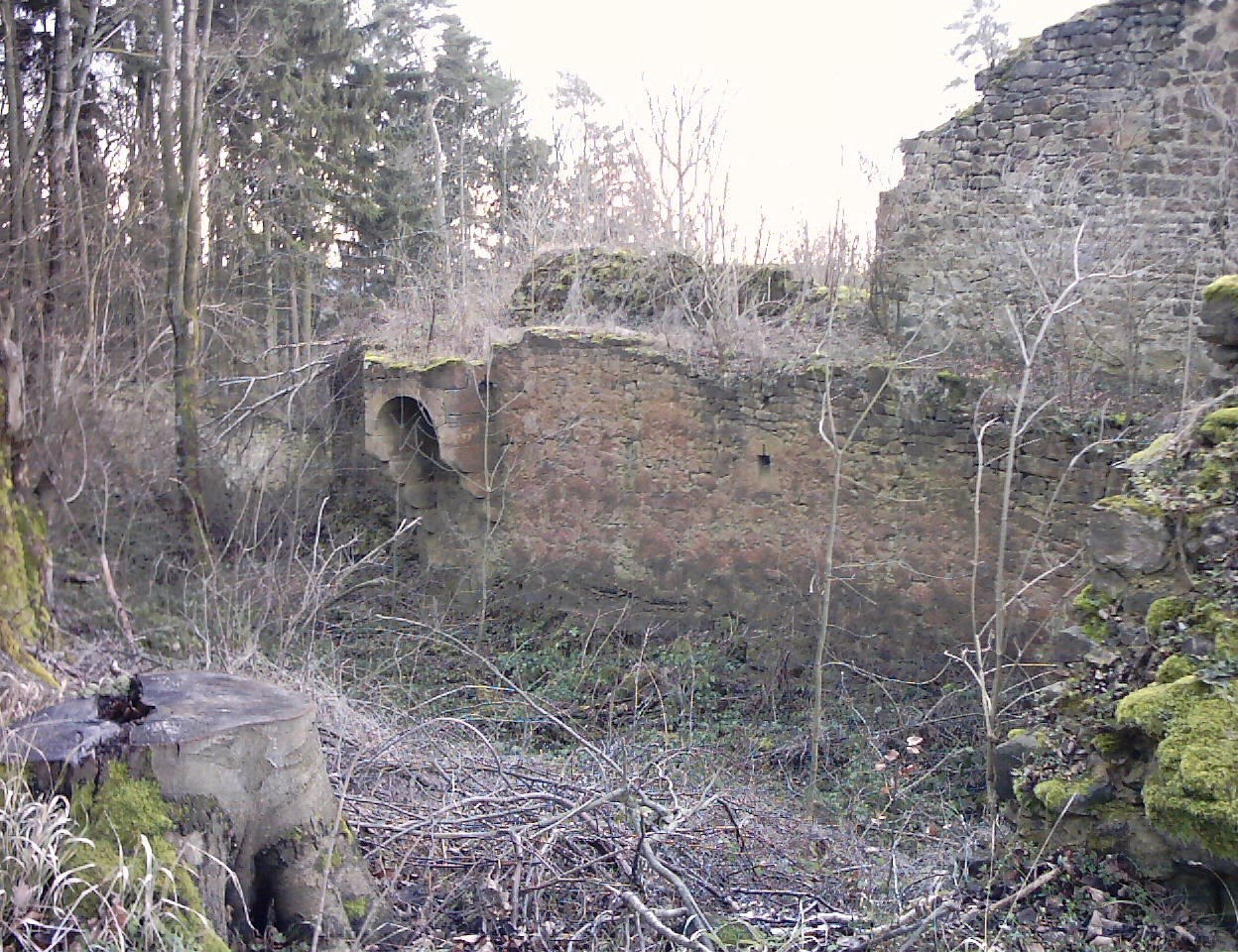
The Hussite period zwinger system with its partially preserved bretèche

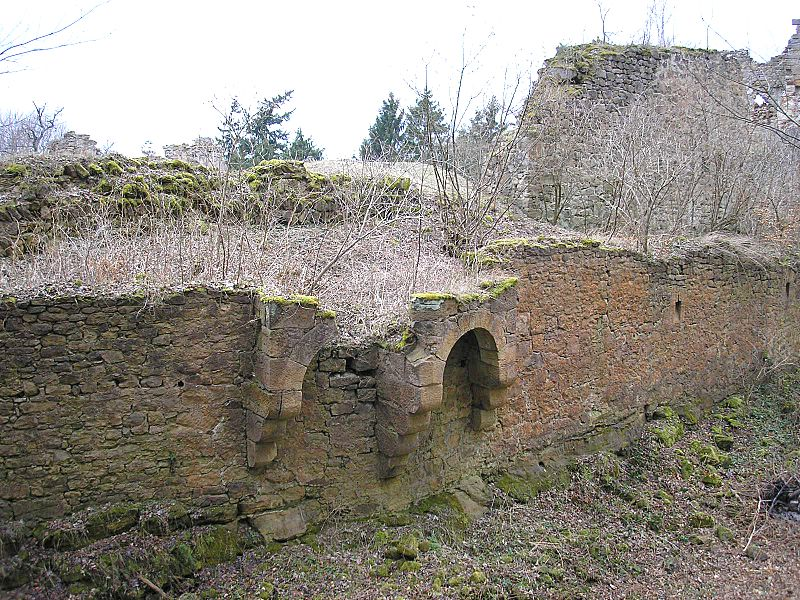
Zwinger, bretèche and the remains of the old enceinte

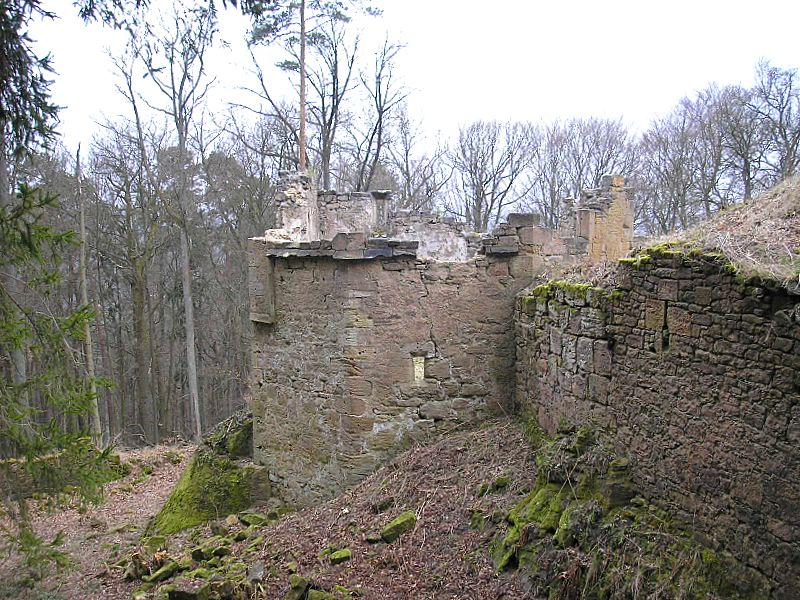
Advanced state of decay of the castle chapel

According to legend, Rauheneck Castle had been built around 1180 the Brambergs after the destruction of their nearby castle had forced them to leave. Thereafter the family named itself after their new castle. In 1231, the free knight, Louis of Ruheneke, placed himself, half the castle and other sundry estates under the lordship of the Bishopric of Würzburg. This was almost certainly not by choice. The family of Rau(h)eneck appears to have died out a short while later (around 1250).

The Lords of Rauheneck mentioned in the written records were designated as "nobiles" (free knights) and it is probable that they are genealogically connected to the free knights of Bramberg. Frederick of Rauheneck occasionally bore the nickname "of Bramberc". He became involved in an inheritance dispute between House of Andechs-Merania and the Bishopric of Bamberg (around 1248).

To protect their barony, the Rauhenecks allied themselves with numerous lesser noble families in the surrounding area and enfeoffed their own estates to vassals. In 1841/42, Georg Ludwig Lehnes, in his History of Baunach Valley, counted the lords of Lichtenstein, Kößeln, Gemeinfeld, Brünn, Hofheim, Ostheim, Scherschlitz, Kotzenwinden (Kurzewind), Redwitz, Breitenbach, Westheim, Mehried, Holfeld, Neubrunn, Schoder and Kliebern amongst the retinue of the Rauhenecks. The names of some of these vassals (Dienstleute) evince that, in the High Middle Ages, a local noble family was resident in virtually every village. However, all these families died out again or returned to the ranks of the commoners fallen or the peasantry.

It is possible that its approach to the Bishopric of Würzburg was a response to intra-family conflict. Because of a dispute with his nephew, Frederick, Louis of Rauheneck placed his estates under the Bishopric in 1244 for a second time as a feudal possession. In return, he was appointed as the castellan (Burgmann) at Rauheneck.

After the Lords of Rauheneck had died out, the Bishopric appointed reeves (vögte) and castellans to the castle. In 1300, Conrad Staudigel held this office. In 1304, a Wolvelin appeared (probably from the family of Stein of Altenstein) as a public official. In 1338, Henry of Sternberg is recorded as a hereditary castellan at Rauheneck. The same year, Albert of Aufseß is also noted as a hereditary castellan at Rauheneck.

In 1341, Henry of Wiesen lived at the fortress and, in 1346, Hans Truchseß of Birkach. In 1364, Apel Fuchs was mentioned in a document. Before 1378, Gecke of Füllbach was bailiff (Amtmann) at Rauheneck.

In the 14th and 15th centuries, the Marschalks of Rau(h)eneck lived at the castle as Würzburg vassals. In 1378, Dietz Marschalk appeared as the first member of his family at the fortress. Dietz invested 280 guilders in expanding his castle seat, money that he was later to receive back from the Bishopric. He also had to pay 120 guilders for the castle estate (Burggut). Ever since he had taken office, the Burggut was connected with the office of Amtmann.

Until 1379, the Kemmerers lived at the castle as joint owners. Dietrich Apel and Bernhard Kemmerer eventually sold their shares to the Marschalk family. In 1430, the Marschalks invested another 200 guilders in the modernization of the fortress in light of the threat posed by the Hussites.

In 1445, the Bishopric enfeoffed William Marschalk with Rauheneck again. In 1476, Heinz Marschalk gave the fief back to Würzburg. At that time the castle was pledged and was sold for hard cash by the bishopric. After this pledge, the administrative districts (Ämter) of Ebern, Sesslach, Bramberg and Rauheneck began to merge gradually. Christoph Fuchs, hitherto bailiff of Ebern and Sesslach, now also managed the Amt of Rauheneck.

In 1483, the lordship was again enfeoffed for 1,000 guilders. After Hartung of Bibra had redeemed the fee with the Bishopric in 1486, the castle was assigned to him as a seat. He had to undertake, however, always to have three armed horsemen (Reisiger) and their horses ready for service.

After the Marschalk family became extinct in 1550 with the death of Frederick Marschalk, the castle finally returned to the Roman Catholic Bishopric of Würzburg. During the Thirty Years' War the Amt was used as a recruiting base for twelve companies of infantry. In 1633/34, two mounted units camped at the castle, which was then under Swedish administration. The Swedish bailiff, Lorenz Scheffer, had to stand down a little later for the Catholic officials from Würzburg.

In 1829, the Barons of Rotenhan became the new owners of the castle, but since then it has been left to fall into decay almost without interruption. July 2006 saw the start of the emergency safety work at the castle after the county of Haßberge was able lease the area for the next few decades. As a preparatory measure an educational archaeological excavation took place under the guidance of a medieval archaeologist.

=== Chapel ===
As early as 1232 a chapel was recorded at the castle, which was incorporated into the parish of Ebern. In 1428 a chaplain (Kaplan) is noted. The population of the surrounding villages of Jesserndorf and Bischwind attended the chapel for church services and had to pay the pastor of Ebern five pounds in Heller coins annually. The chapel was consecrated to Saint John the Baptist and was located in the zwinger or outer defensive enclosure of the castle. In 1436, the Bishop of Würzburg approved a cemetery at the site.

The church continued to be used after the abandonment of the castle until 1745. The vicarage had already been moved by 1615, however.

Originally the castle chapel was clearly on the ground floor of the palas next to the later gatekeeper's room. A small Gothic arch window has survived on the exterior wall. It is possible that the ground floor continued to be used even after the construction of the new chapel as a prayer room. On the remains of the rendering of the round-arched entrance of the small guard's room two consecration crosses are still visible.

=== Müllers of Raueneck ===
In 1842, the History of the Baunach Valley in Lower Franconia appeared in Würzburg, self-published by author, Georg Ludwig Lehne. He expressed the widespread view that the family of Marschalke of Raueneck had died out in 1550.

On 1 August 1842, a G.K.W. Müller von Raueneck published a "correction" of this opinion in Schleusingen, claiming to be a descendant of this family. He maintained that a George of Raueneck lost his fortune as a result of family disputes and so, in 1508, entered the service of the Imperial Army. His wife, a von Lichtenstein, had died shortly beforehand. The nobleman therefore arranged for his four-year-old son, Friedrich, to be brought up by the childless Müller von Frickendorf. He later arranged for the boy to be made heir to the Rauenecks, but required that the family should henceforth bear the surname "Müller zu Raueneck". The Rauenecks were also supposed to be linked to the Austrian Rauhenecks. But according to Lehne the family was genealogically related to the lords of Rotenhan.

This "correction" was published in 2005 without comment in a reprint of the History of the Baunach Valley. In fact, the name of Müller von Raueneck appears even to the present day in some lists and directories of the nobility, but the surname seems to have disappeared in Germany today. The author of the "correction" even added his observations to a family tree of the Müllers of Raueneck citing unspecified "documentary excerpts".

The details of the mysterious G.K.W Müller von Raueneck have not yet been properly verified by specialists. Thus, it is unclear whether it is just a joke, possibly from academic circles. Lehne was just a simple archive writer without any academic training; an early, dedicated local historian, whose work was possibly just being denigrated by someone.

== Description ==
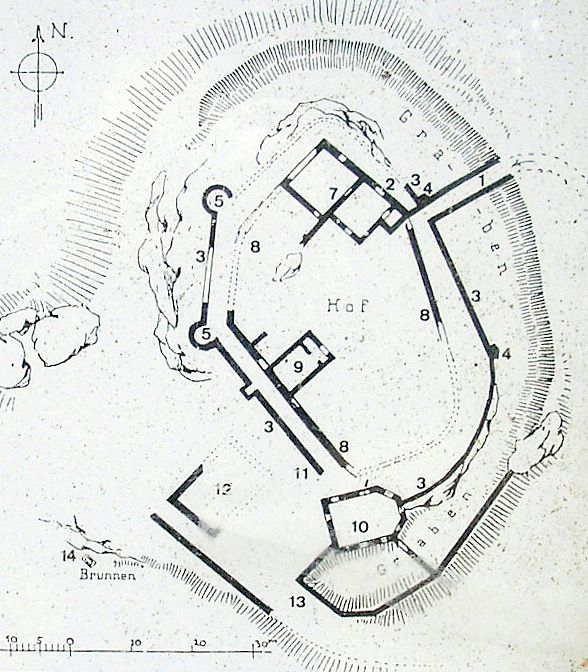
Plan of the castle (1916 Art Monuments Inventory, information board at the castle)

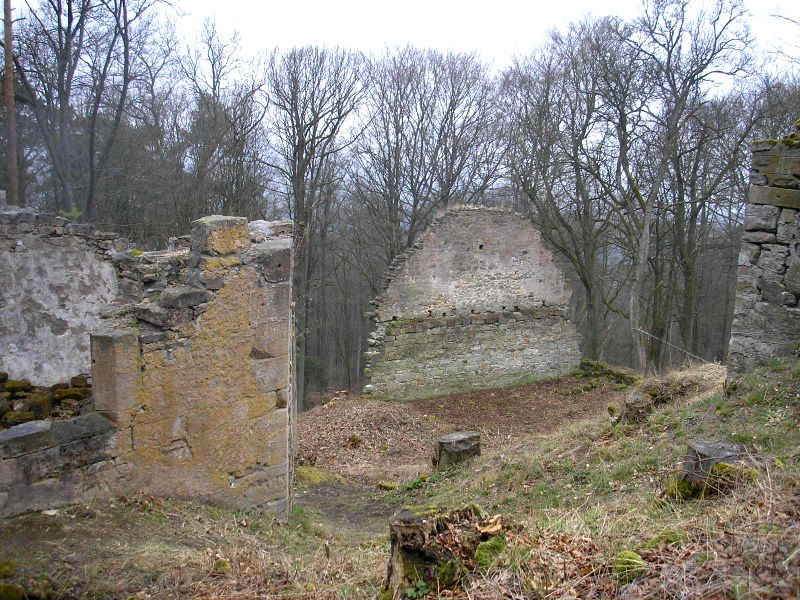
Chapel and lower ward

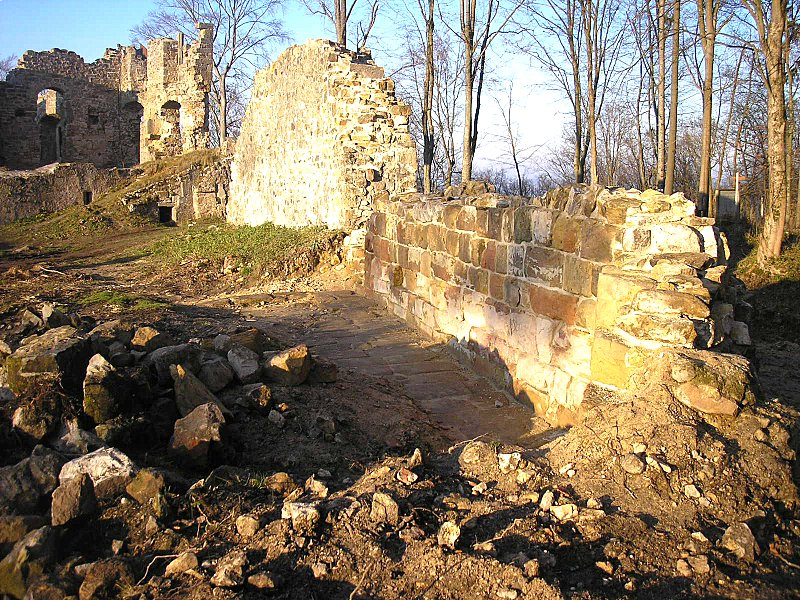
The exposed older enceinte and flooring

Parts of the impressive Hussite period zwinger systems (walled fighting enclosures) have survived with their two round towers and a bretèche (Schießerker), as well as the ruins of the palas, with its great hall, the late Gothic chapel and two basement Vaults.

Today the grounds are entered on the east side over a stone arch bridge dating to the 16th/17th century. The bridge was needed when the main entrance had been moved next to the palas and the neck ditch in front of the zwinger system had to be crossed. A sealed earlier gate, situated to its right on the ground floor of the palas, has survived. The original main gate could have been located in the gap in the wall in front of the chapel on the other side of the castle (see Zeune's artist's impression).

During the construction of the bridge, one of the two bretèches of the zwinger was largely dismantled. The surviving bretèche is in a critically dangerous condition, its left part having collapsed decades ago.

To the right rise the ruins of palas (13th to 16th century) which have been secured by emergency work. The huge Renaissance window of the upper floor poses serious historic preservation problems. One of the windows was underpinned by a steel frame. Of interesting is a small fireplace in the tiny room next to the bridge. It may well have been the gatekeeper's room. Of the other internal buildings only remains of walls and vaults have survived.

Whether the castle has possessed a bergfried cannot be ascertained. A possible site for such a tower is considered by some castle researchers castle to be a pile of rubble west of the palas. A highly stylized illustration on a 1665 map shows a tower with a gable roof next to the chapel. This illustration is considered as evidence of the existence of a bergfried in the web project "Castles in Bavaria" (Burgen in Bayern) by the House of Bavarian History. However, this schematic illustration is certainly no indication of the actual existence of such a structure. Until a specialized archaeological investigation of the surmised tower location has been carried out all such suggestions must remain speculative. Nevertheless, when Dietz Marschalk took office in 1378, he had to pay the watchman and the gatekeeper.

Of note are the ruins of the old late Gothic chapel, which projects bastion-like into the neck ditch. There are still cleaning residues from the original consecration crosses. However, the chapel has been badly affected by the increasing vandalism of the ruins. In early 2005, part of the beautiful external cornice (Kaffgesims) was thrown into the ditch. Some structural damage resulted from a failed attempt by a youth group to renovate the top of the wall in the late 20th century. Around 1980, a human skeleton was unearthed in the chapel during an illegal excavation, suggesting that a tomb or crypt lay under the chapel.

Of the zwinger system facing the valley, there are still two round towers, a long section of the zwinger wall to the left of the chapel and, adjoining it, a tower-like projection identified as a cistern.

Below the main bailey was a large outer bailey. Here, there is still the gable wall of a large barn-like building. In 2008, this part of the castle was also made safe. In the vicinity are other wall remains, artificial modifications to the rock and a stone fountain trough. Further uphill is the entrance to a spacious, artificially enlarged cave, which was apparently used as a cellar.

Northeast of the castle a mighty boulder shows clear traces of human workmanship. On the top, a rectangular cavity has been carved, possibly another cistern. Nearby, a memorial stone commemorating the unsolved murder of a berry-picker in the early 20th century. The quarry that can be made out behind it probably dates to the Middle Ages, used to produce building stone for the construction of the castle.

The whole castle was built of local sandstone. Numerous beautiful architectural elements lie neglected and overgrown with moss on the forest floor.

The buildings are in severe danger of collapse, In the summer of 2006, however, essential emergency work started to make the site safe. The castle's decay has been accelerated by a frequent esoteric-occult activities.

The castle is a station on the Haßberge Castle Educational Trail (Burgenkundlicher Lehrpfad Haßberge) established by the county of Haßberge.

== Legend ==
There is a striking coincidence between a legend associated with the castle about of a buried treasure that can only be lifted by a Sunday's child and an almost identical saga about the ruined castle of the same name near Baden in Lower Austria. In both stories the treasure is guarded by a restless spirit. The treasure hunter must have been rocked in a cradle made from the wood of a cherry tree growing on the top of the castle. The similarity between the two legends was already noted by Ludwig Bechstein in his 1853 German Fairy Tale Book (The Little Cherry Tree at Raueneck Castle, No. 827). Perhaps the legend was transferred in the early 19th century because of the similarity of the castle's name to its better-known counterpart in the Vienna Woods.

== Safety work ==
In the course of the archaeological educational dig, several pits that had been opened by grave robbers were filled and part of the high medieval enceinte of the inner bailey were exposed. This brought to light the remains of a floor of stone flags and a toilet. The garderobe opening was in the wall, the partially preserved waste pipe led into the moat before the construction of the zwinger system.

Safety work has not yet finished. By the end of 2006 other conservation measures had been carried out on the palas. Here the gaping hole in the cellar vault was sealed up with brick. One of the Renaissance double windows that was in serious danger of collapse was given an internal steel support frame.

The masonry of the exposed enceinte, with its opus spicatum infill, was made safe, as was the top of the chapel walls. The architectural details lost in recent times (chapel and palas, cross-wall to the castle courtyard) were not, however, reconstructed.

== Gallery ==
The ruins of Rauheneck just before and during emergency repair work in 2006 and 2007.

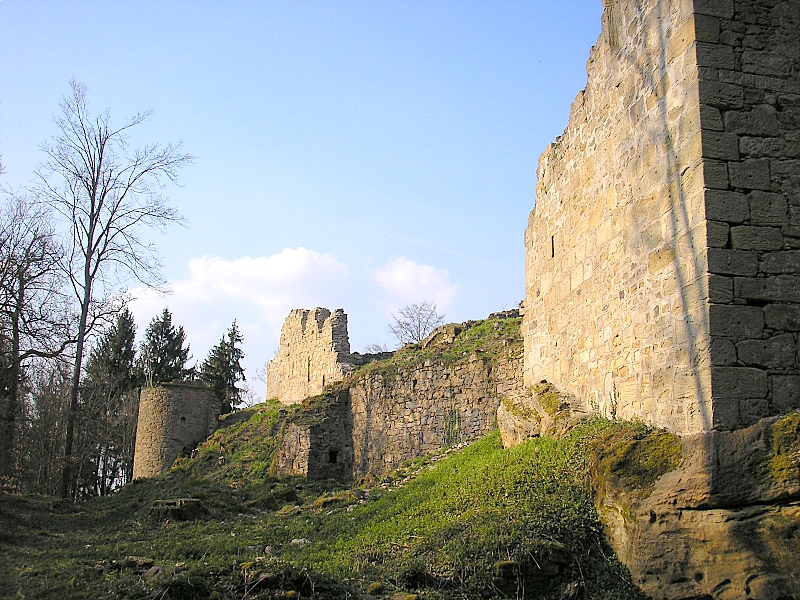
The west side of the castle seen from the south with the chapel and the southwestern zwinger tower

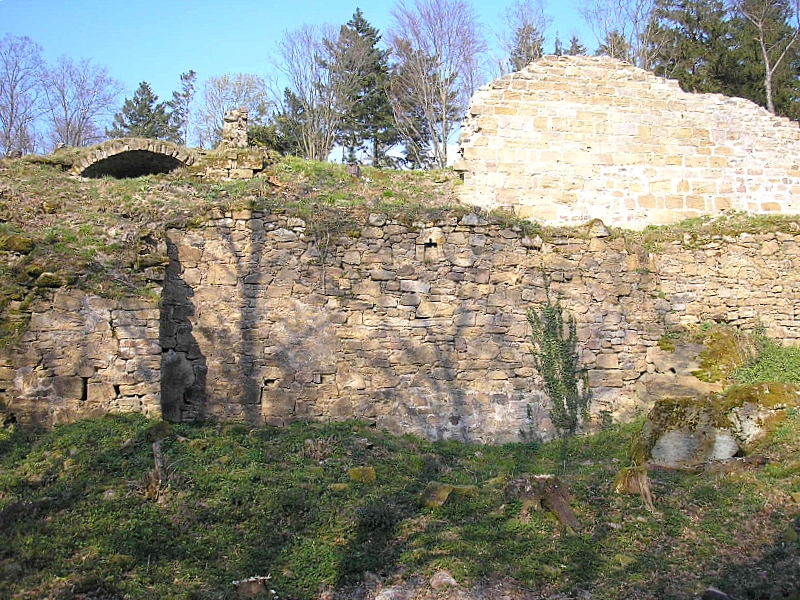
The west zwinger with the cistern tower (left), as well as one of the two surviving cellar vaultings

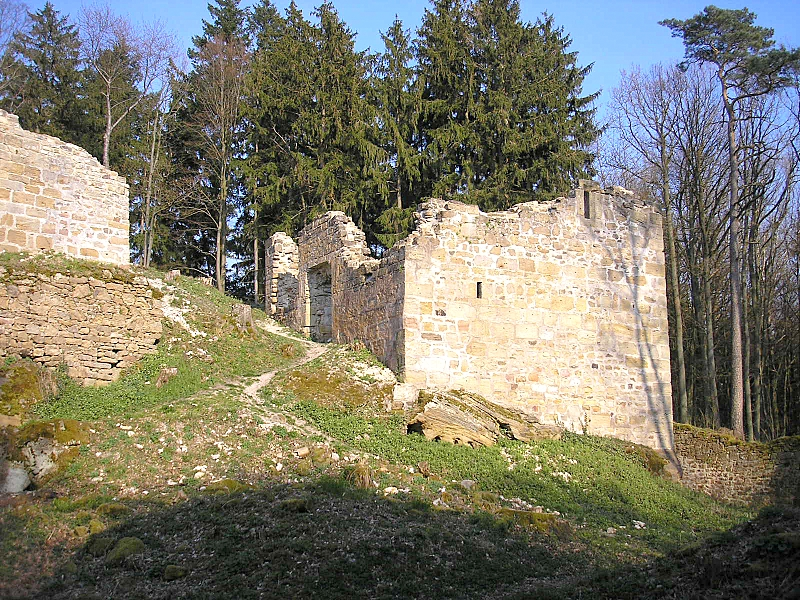
The castle chapel of the lower ward. Left: what is probably the high medieval main gateway. In its state before the renovations

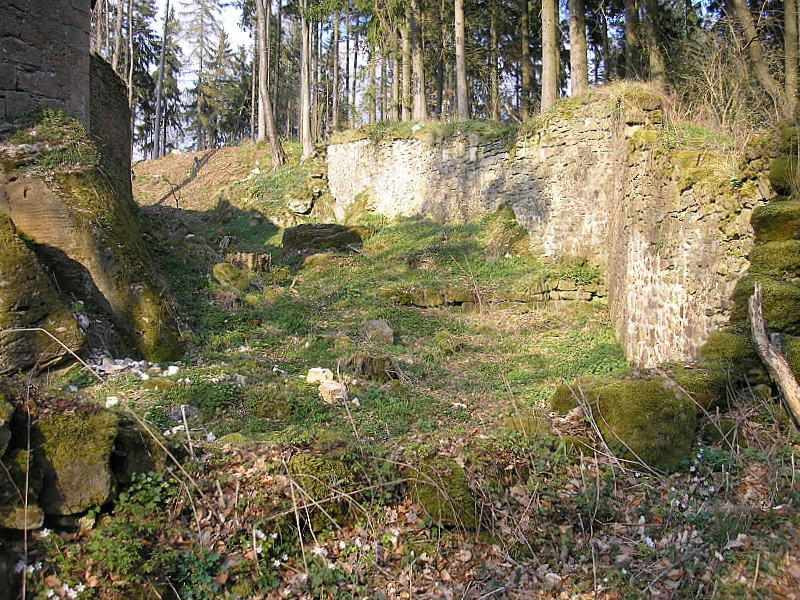
The neck ditch to the northwest with the foundation of the cross-wall

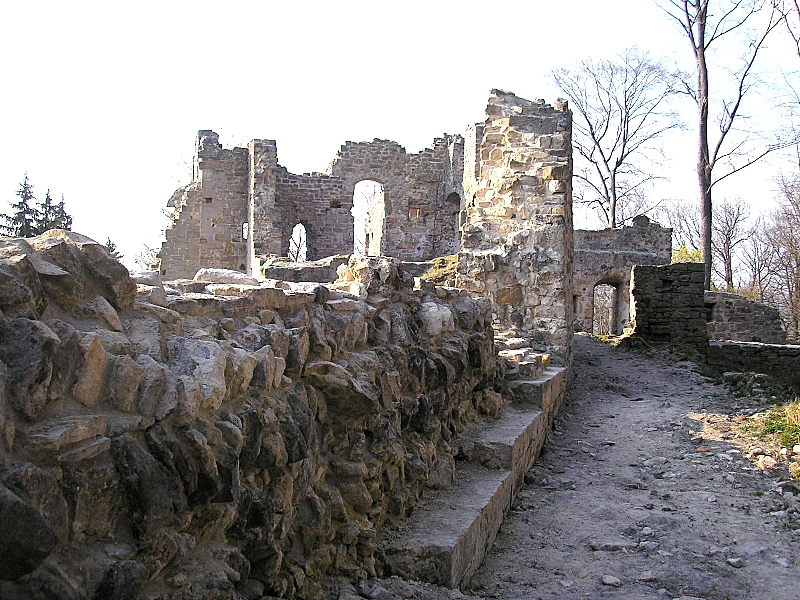
View out of the east zwinger of the palas. Left: the exposed masonry of the high medieval enceinte

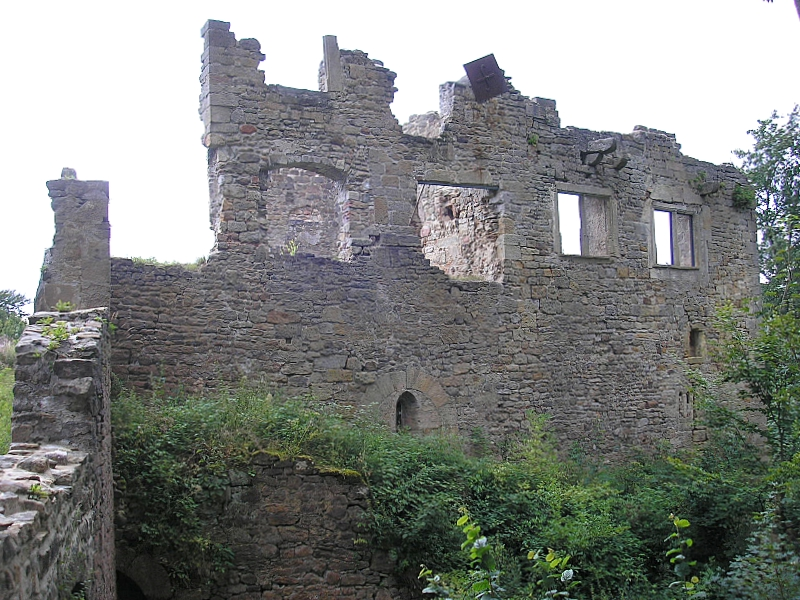
The secured palas from the east. Left, near the bridge, a part of the zwinger wall. The right-hand window of the upper storey was protected by a steel frame

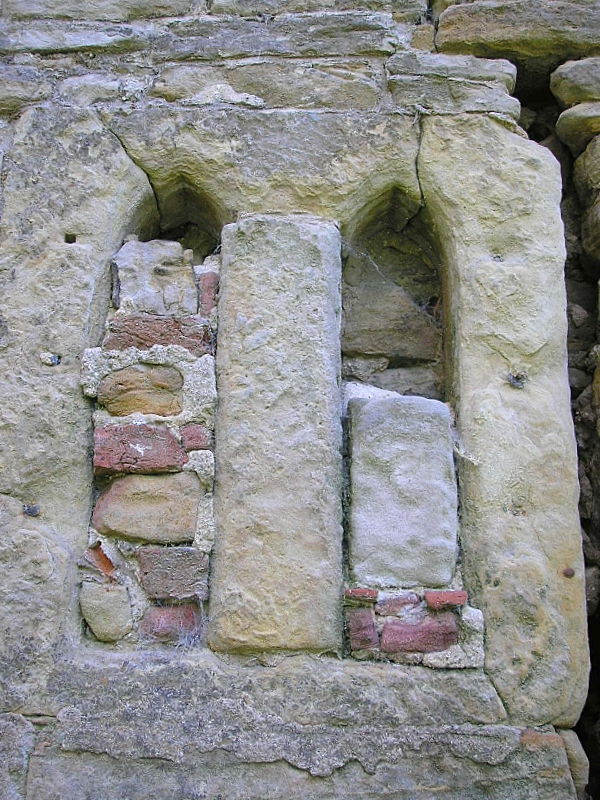
Staggered, high Gothic double window on the ground floor of the east wall of the palas

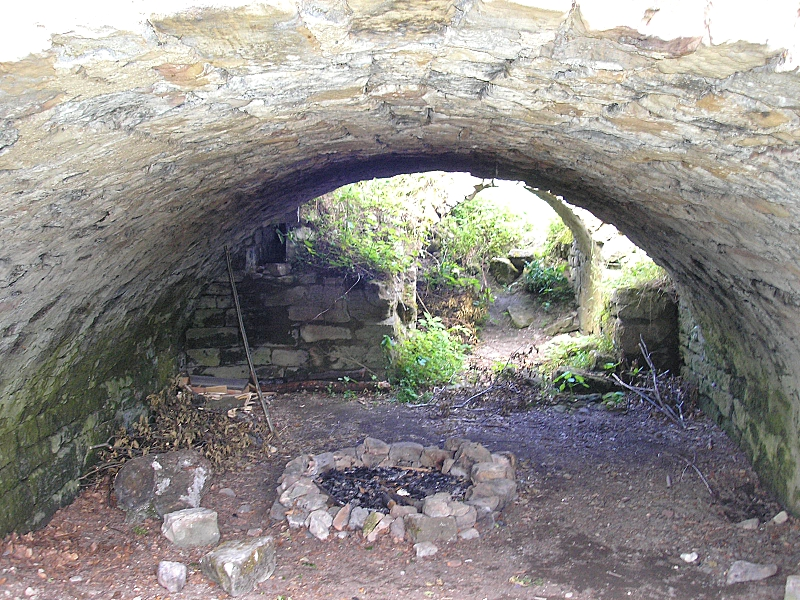
The western cellar vaulting to the east

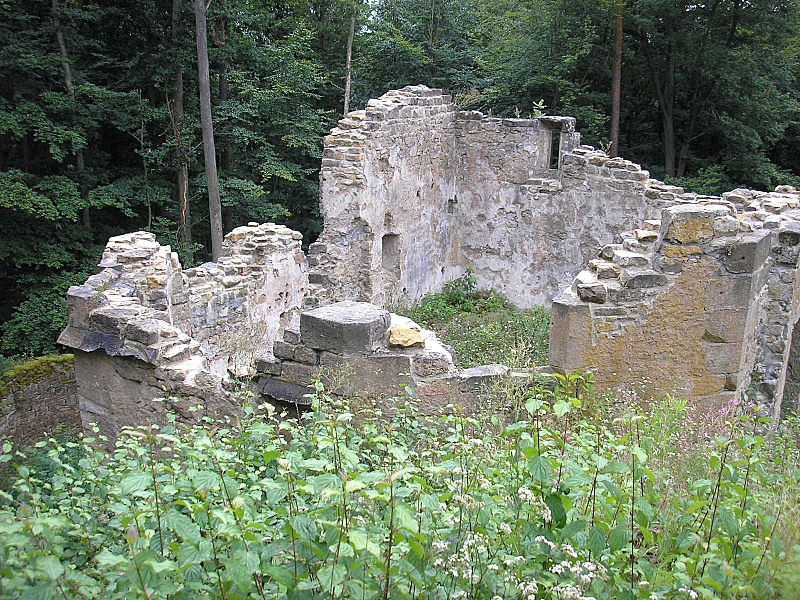
The castle chapel after repairs to the tops of the walls (August 2007)

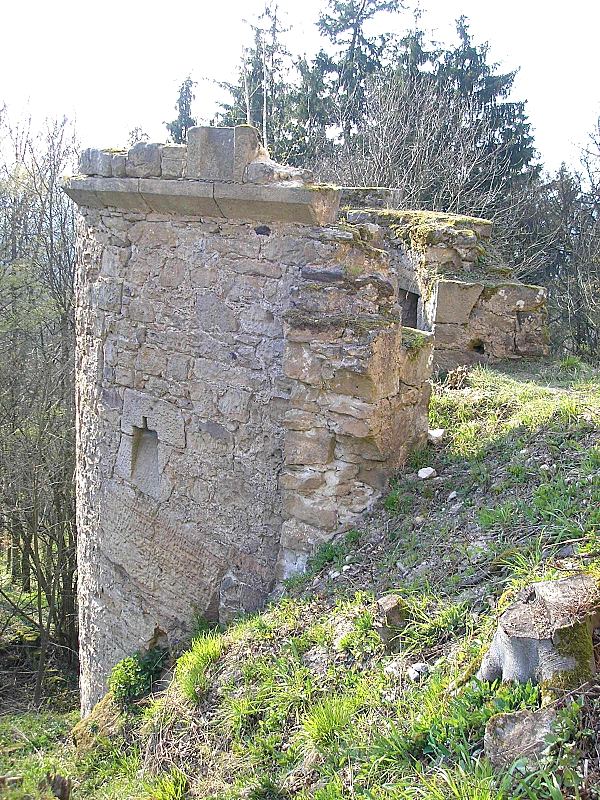
The southwestern zwinger tower

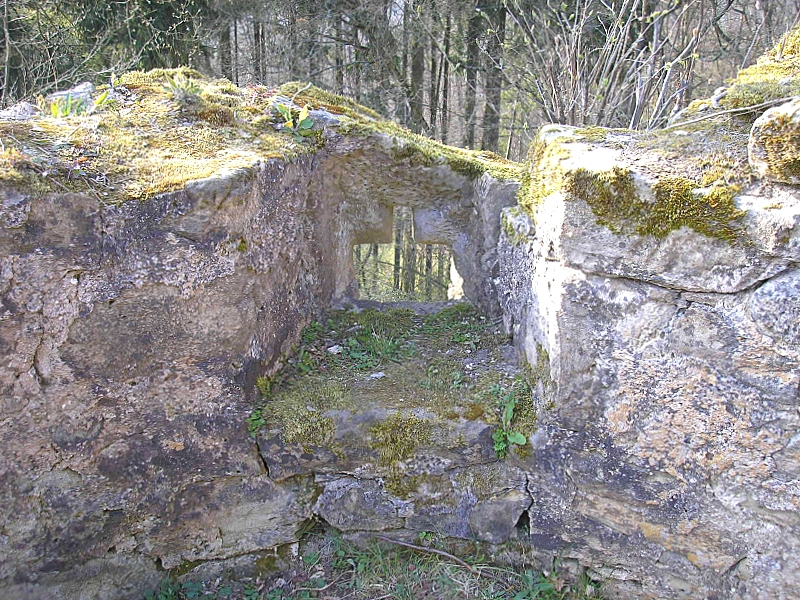
Arrow slit on the northwestern zwinger tower

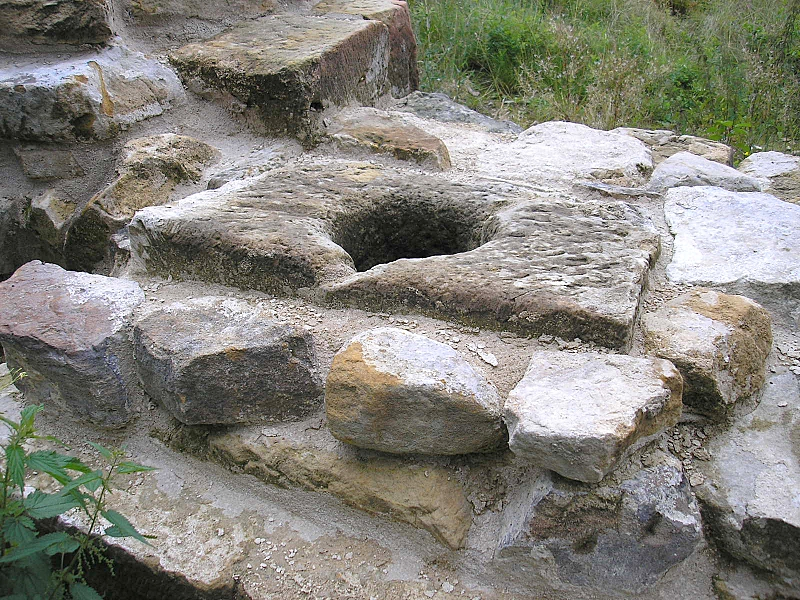
Garderobe shaft on the high medieval enceinte on the eastern side. The shaft opened over the moat in front of the zwinger

== Literature ==
- Georg Ludwig Lehnes: Geschichte of the Baunach-Grundes in Lower Franconia. Würzburg, 1842, Nachdruck Neustadt an of the Aisch, 2005, ISBN 3-89557-251-9.
- The Kunstdenkmäler of the Königreichs Bavaria, XV, Bezirksamt Ebern, Munich, 1916, pp. 177–182.
- Isolde Maierhöfer: Ebern (Historischer Atlas von Bavaria, Teil Franken, Issue 15). Munich, Kommission für bayerische Landesgeschichte, 1964.
- Joachim Zeune: Burgen in the Eberner Land. in: Eberner Heimatblätter, 2 issues, Ebern, 2003.
