= Rauheneck Castle =

Rauheneck refers to the following castles in Europe:

- Rauheneck Castle (Ebern) near Ebern in Bavaria, Germany
- Rauheneck Castle (Baden) near Baden (near Vienna) in Lower Austria
