= Zingel (fortification) =

A Zingel (lat. cingulum = "belt") is part of the outer bailey of a castle. The term is German.

Originally it was taken to be the palisade, the bank on which it stood and the ditch in front of it. In the High and Late Middle Ages the term also included the outer curtain wall or enceinte of a castle or city, otherwise known as the "Zingel wall" (Zingelmauer), which conformed to the surrounding terrain.

Often also called a "mantle wall" (Mantelmauer) or Bering, the term survives today in German street names, for example, in Eckernförde, Hildesheim, Husum, Meldorf or Salzgitter. Derivative names are found in Bremerhaven (Zingelke), Essen (Zingelpfad) or Niemberg (Zingelrain). In all there are around thirty roads and streets in Germany, whose names are derived from this term. In addition, the name has also been used as a surname.

== See also ==
- Zwinger
