= Nürburg Castle =

Castle ruin

Nürburg
- Noureberg, Mons Nore
- Nürburg
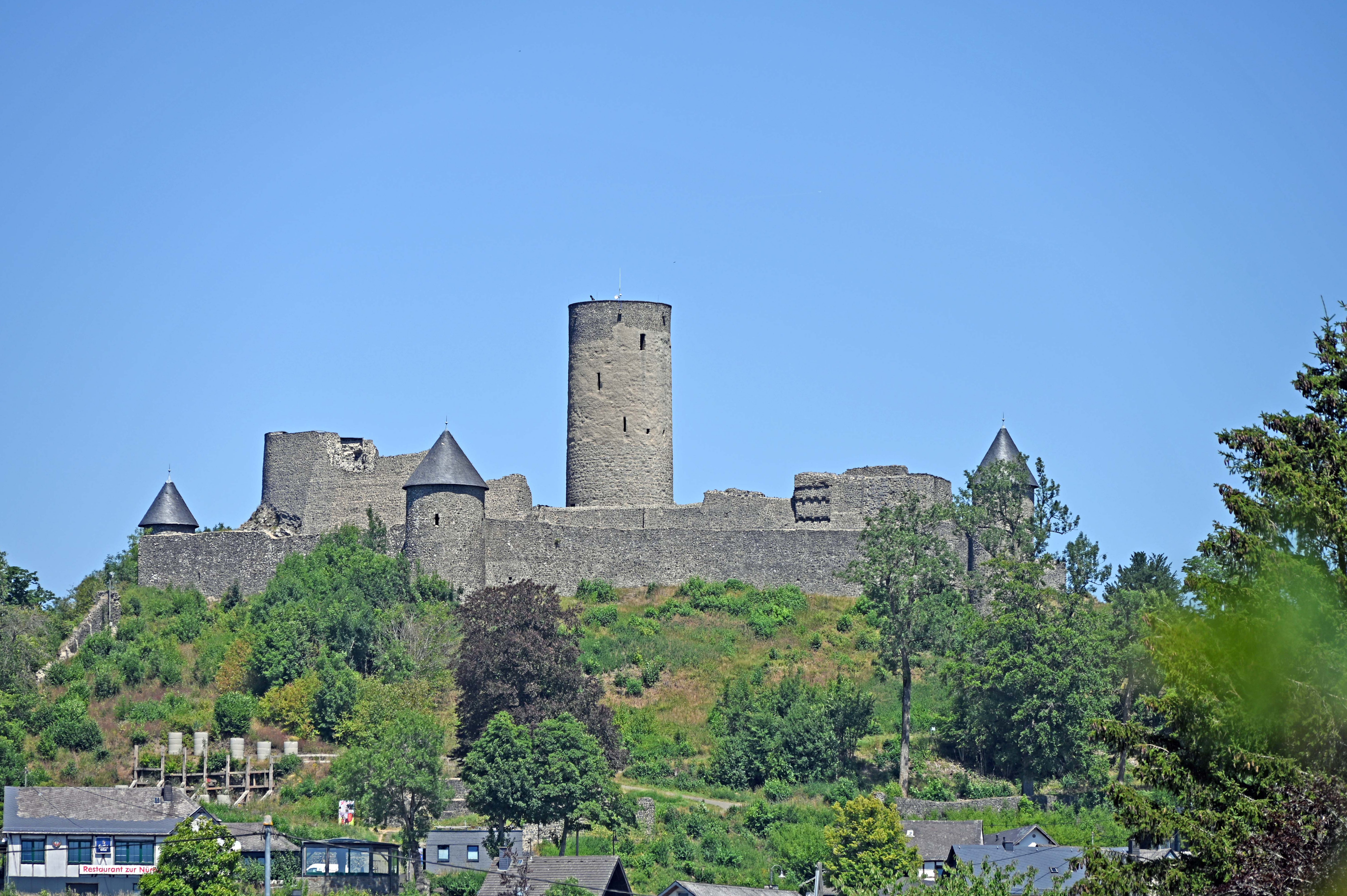
- The Nürburg

Site information
- Type: hill castle, summit location
- Code: DE-RP
- Condition: ruin

Location
- Location within Rhineland-Palatinate Location within Germany
- Coordinates: 50°20′47.25″N 06°57′14.66″E
- Height: 678 m above sea level (NN)

Site history
- Built: 1166

Garrison information
- Occupants: ministeriales

The Nürburg is a ruined hilltop castle in the German Eifel Mountains near the village of Nürburg south of Adenau in the district of Ahrweiler in the state of Rhineland-Palatinate. It stands within the famous North Loop, or Nordschleife, of the Nürburgring racing course at an altitude of 678 m (2,224 ft) on a volcanic basalt cone. It may be visited for a fee.

== History ==
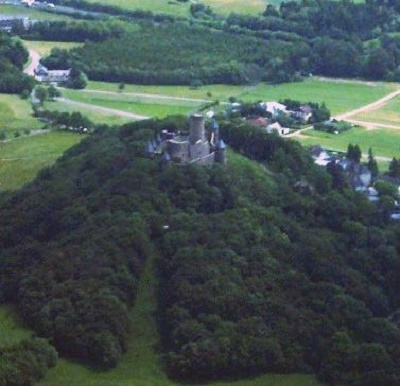
An aerial view of Nürburg Castle

The site was first mentioned in the records in 1166 as Noureberg or Mons Nore, but it is probable that it was already used as a signal station in Roman times to protect the important Roman road that ran through the Eifel.

The actual instigator of the Nürburg was Count Ulrich, who is named in a document from 1169, although his father, Dietrich I of Are, had already started the construction of a refuge castle on the mountain. Ulrich's descendants called themselves the lords of Nürburg and Are and were vassals (Lehnsmänner) of the bishops of Cologne and the Hohenstaufen emperor.

In 1290, ownership of the castle was transferred to the Electorate of Cologne, because there were no more descendants of the lords of Nürburg. The archbishopric appointed a bailiff (Amtmann), who from then on was to represent their interests.

The construction of the castle was carried out in three stages. After the construction of the rectangular inner ward or kernburg, the zwinger walls were built between 1340 and 1369 under the bailiff, Johann von Schleiden, as a second defensive ring. In the 15th century a third wall was erected to protect the hitherto freely-accessible castellan's buildings that have not survived.

As early as the 16th century the castle fell into a very poor condition, a situation which the officiating bailiffs complained about. As a result, restoration work was carried out several times.

In 1633, during the Thirty Years' War, the Nürburg was captured by the Swedes under General Baudissin, who plundered and damaged it. In 1674, Imperial troops occupied the castle.

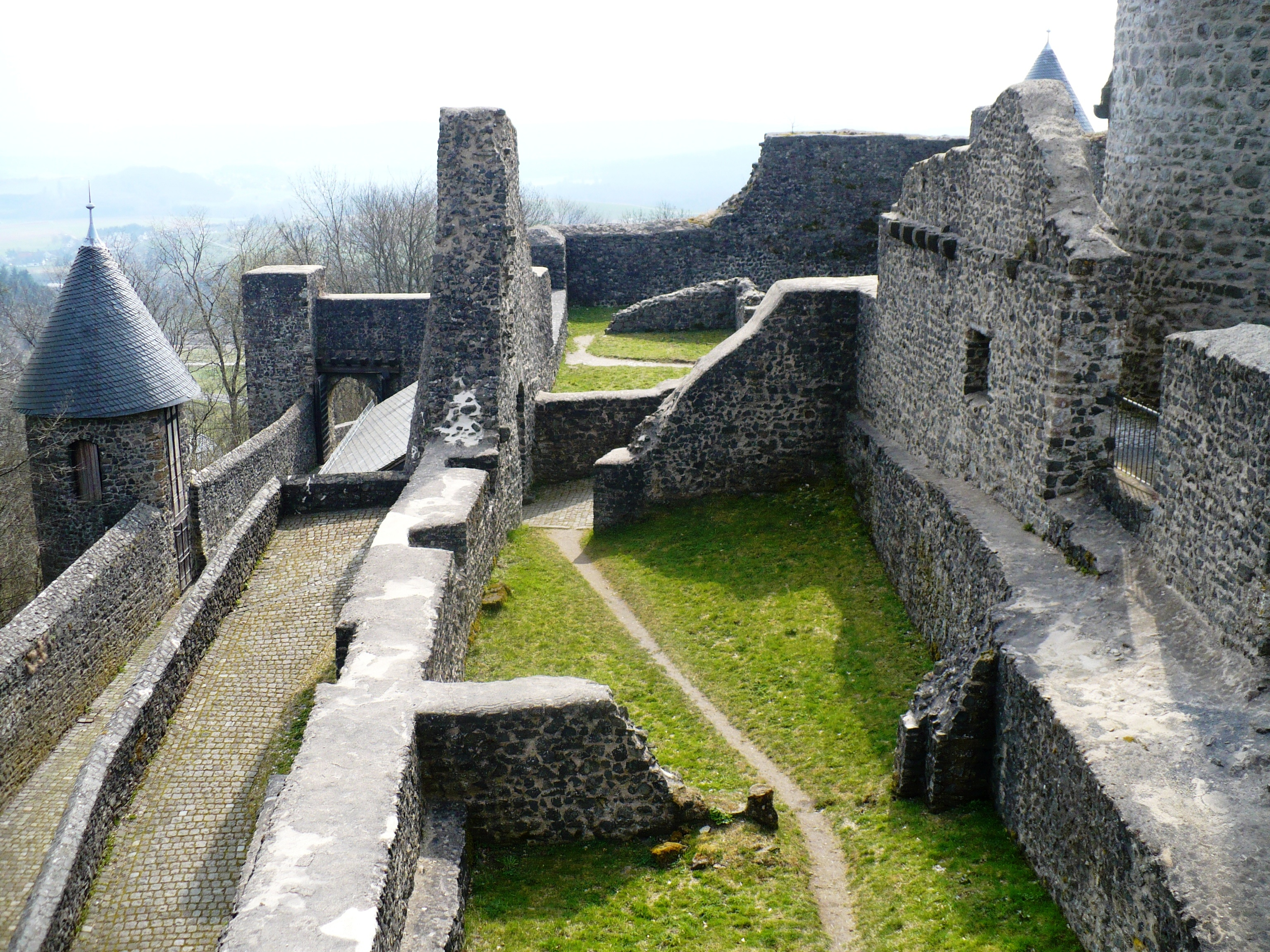
A view of the restored parts of the castle

In 1689, French soldiers finally destroyed the place. The surviving keep, or bergfried, was initially used as a prison, but was no longer fit for that purpose after 1752. The castle was abandoned and used as a stone quarry.

In 1818 Prussia had the bergfried restored because, with its height of 678 m above sea level (NN), it would be able to act as a trigonometric point. In the course of this work the outer ward was demolished. Today only the remnants of the enceinte testify to its existence.

In 1949, ownership of the ruins was transferred to Rhineland-Palatinate's State Department for Conservation, who entrusted it to the Management of State Castles of Rhineland-Palatinate (Verwaltung der staatlichen Schlösser Rheinland-Pfalz, today the Burgen, Schlösser Altertümer Rheinland-Pfalz). The latter had work carried out several times (last in 1988/89) in order to expose elements of the building that had been filled in, as well as to carry out safety and restoration work.
