= Nürburg =

- Municipality
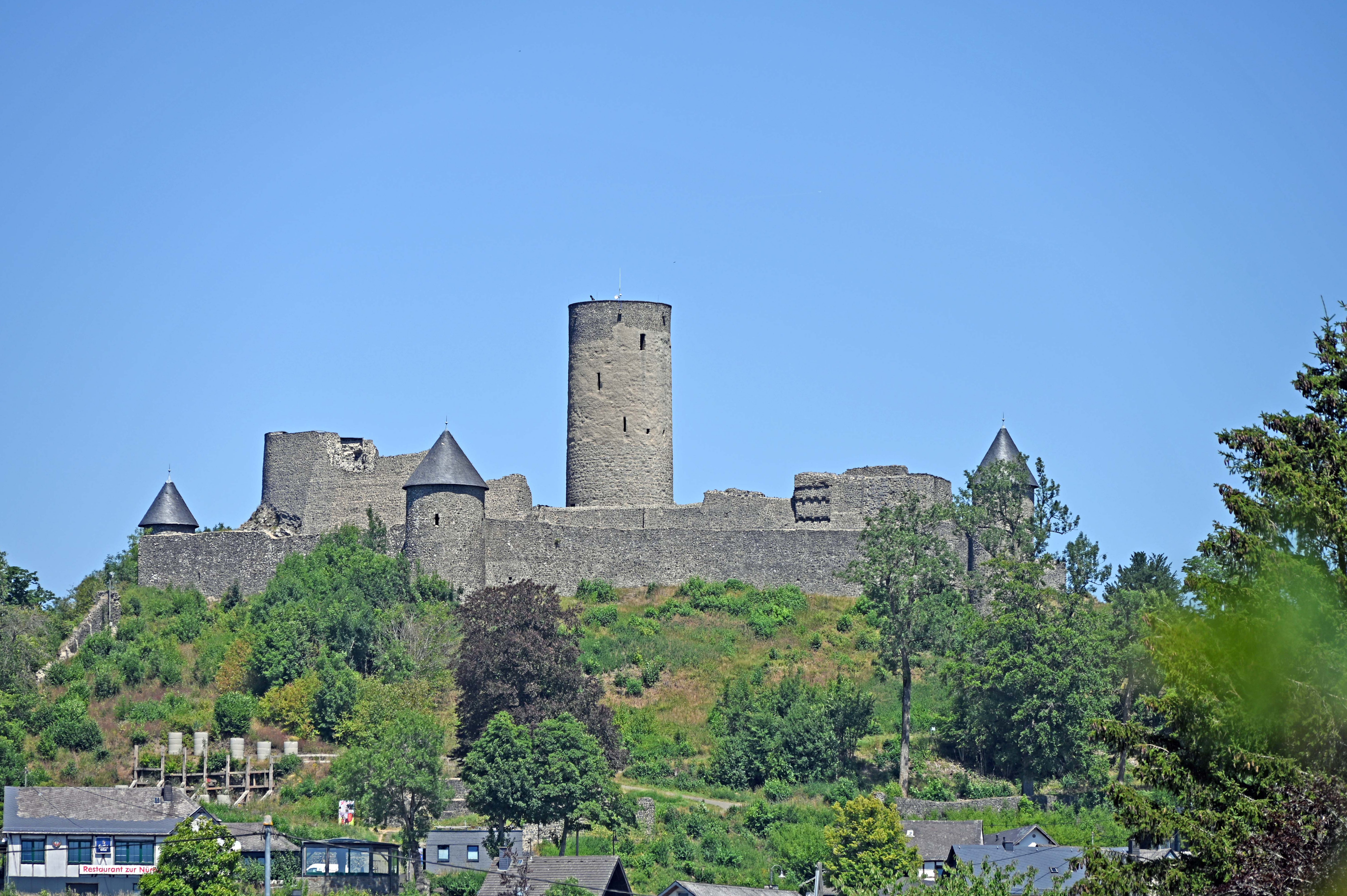
- Nürburg Castle

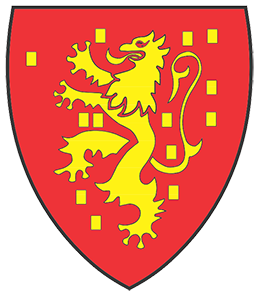
- Coat of arms

- Location of Nürburg within Ahrweiler district
- Interactive map of Nürburg
- Location within Germany Location within Rhineland-Palatinate
- Coordinates: 50°20′32″N 6°57′8″E
- Country: Germany
- State: Rhineland-Palatinate
- District: Ahrweiler
- Municipal assoc.: Adenau

Government
  - Mayor (2019–24): Anita Schomisch

Area
  - Total: 3.63 km^{2} (1.40 sq mi)
- Elevation: 539 m (1,768 ft)

Population (2025-12-31)
  - Total: 192
  - Density: 52.9/km^{2} (137/sq mi)
- Time zone: UTC+01:00 (CET)
  - Summer (DST): UTC+02:00 (CEST)
- Postal codes: 53520
- Dialling codes: 02691
- Vehicle registration: AW
- Website: www.nuerburg.de

Nürburg (German pronunciation: [ˈnyːɐ̯bʊʁk]) is a town in the German district of Ahrweiler, in the state of Rhineland-Palatinate. It is also the name of the local castle, Nürburg Castle, which was built in the High Middle Ages. The castle is made of basalt which usually has black color. The well-known 24-kilometre (15 mi) racing track Nürburgring is nearby.

== Location ==
The Nürburg rises above the village of the same name on the second-highest hill in the Eifel (678 metres or 2,224 feet). The castle and hill are regarded as a characteristic feature of the Eifel. There are almost no written sources relating to the history of the castle's construction in the Middle Ages. The hill is referred to in documentary evidence in 954 by the name mone nore, which means black hill. In descriptions of boundaries which served to clarify which property belonged to whom, it was used as a significant reference marker. The name Nürburg is thought to derive from mons nore, as the color of the volcanic basalt used to build the castle exhibits an unusually dark color.

== History ==
=== Prehistory to Middle Ages ===
The history of when the Nürburg was established has not been definitively clarified. There is no evidence to suggest that it was built instead of a Roman fort, the commonly held view in the local area. Discoveries of Roman coins do not constitute sufficient evidence. Owing to a similarity between names, one legend even traces the Nürburg back to a fort established by Emperor Nero. Among other things, archaeological barrows attest to the fact that the area surrounding the castle was populated in early historical times. However, there are no indications that the castle hill was once home to a refuge or prehistoric walled fortification, as is occasionally thought.

While local historians held the view that the castle had been erected by Theoderich I, Count of Are, (who died in 1132) as a refuge for the ruling court of Adenau, nowadays his son Ulrich von Are, the self-proclaimed Count of Nürburg, is considered to be the person responsible for commissioning the building of the castle, even though there is no source material to back this theory. Castle Are is situated above Altenahr, and was built by a group of counts, probably the Ahrgau counts. The group was associated with the Carolingian nobility and named itself after it.

The Nürburg is situated 20 km (12 miles) south of Castle Are, where the Counts of Are belonged to a family circle whose members can be traced back to the 9th century. In the 10th century, they are alleged to have held rights in what would subsequently become the village of Nürburg. The counts were able to build up an independent power base within the High Eifel and at the upper Ahr and this power base was centered between Adenau, Nürburg, and Altenahr. The counts were divided up between several ancestral lines: the Are-Hochstaden line held the property in the village of Nürburg.

Around 1220/30, a different ancestral line built Neuenahr Castle. With the death of Count Lothar in around 1246, the Counts of Are-Hochstaden died out. Their estate was inherited by the Archbishop of Cologne (Konrad von Are-Hochstaden).

Count Ulrich von Nürburg first appears in documents linking him to the Nürburg in 1169. He is considered to be the person responsible for commissioning the building of the castle. There is a document originating from 1166 in which Are and Nürburg Castles are mentioned within the context of rights which the Archbishop of Cologne granted to Count Ulrich and his family. At that time, the castle was an open house of the Archbishop of Cologne: the opening right affording him access to the castle and the option to use it if he needed to. In those days, the counts of Are-Nürburg were supporters of the Staufian imperial family.

=== Modern Age ===
Historians suspected that the officials who were pledged the use of the castle from the 14–16th century were more concerned with exploiting the castle than with preserving it. This was reflected in the large amount of damage that Augustin von Braunsberg noted when he financed its repair in 1534. According to his report, Augustin had the gate to the valley re-erected and had a stable built in the courtyard. A storm had also torn off the roof of the main tower and damaged the vaults within. In order to prevent its total collapse, the tower was reconstructed in 1535. Augustin also financed the construction of a brewery, cowshed, meat house, and bakery within the walls.

In 1587, the castle was plundered by Dutch soldiers. There are also reports from the early 17th century outlining the damage to, and decline of the castle. An occupation in 1605 by southern European soldiers caused significant damage. The soldiers removed the lead bracing in the main tower leaving it in a perilous state of near collapse. In 1607, funds were raised by the local archiepiscopal commission, and restoration work carried out in 1612, where 77 windows were installed to make the castle more livable. However, that same year, a severe storm tore the chimneys and roofs off some of the buildings leaving the castle in a nearly ruined state. In 1633, during Thirty Years' War, the castle was occupied by Swedish troops as a defensible position, and by 1656, the castle fell into a state of near uninhabitability. Despite the crumbling walls, the castle was still seen an important military site due to its high position and relative ease of defense.

In 1752, the main tower of Castle Nürburg was used as a prison until the dungeons fell into a state of total ruin. From this point, the castle was abandoned and left to decay, as farmers in the area continued to remove stones from the site for use as local building material. The Burgstube hotel at the base of the castle evidences some of this pirating of the stone in its foundation that dates to the 17th century. The Franciscan friars from Adenau issued a decree from Adenau to take as much stone as they needed in order to repair their convent.

Drawings from the late 18th century show the castle as a complete ruin. In 1792, the French occupied the left side of the Rhine, and in 1801, the French army destroyed the remaining portions of the outer wall, leaving only the inner wall, and the main tower standing to attest to what was the Nürburg.

Restoration work started in 1846–78 where the main tower was renewed. A stone staircase was built into the tower, with the uppermost vault being reconstructed in order to provide views over the entire High Eifel. In 1871, the inner wall and main gate were completely reconstructed into the form seen today, complete with non-original fairytale style conical tops on the wall towers.

In 1953–71, the castle was transferred to the administration of the Rhineland-Palatinate. As money poured into Nürburg for repair and expansion projects to the Nürburgring, extensive work was again carried out on the castle. The walls of the wards were rebuilt, and the shoring up of the towers completed in order to make the castle safe for tourists.

== Climate ==
Nürburg has a semi-continental climate with both oceanic and continental tendencies. It does however land in the former category (Köppen Cfb). With regards to the racetrack, due to the Nordschleife's varied terrain and elevation, weather may be completely different on either end of the track. The elevation shift also makes thermal differences a strong possibility. The modern Grand Prix circuit also has sizeable elevation changes between the start-finish straight and the lowest point on the opposite end of the track, but the geographical distance and actual elevation gain between the two are lower. Annual sunshine is in the 1500s, which is low by European standards, but sunnier than the nearest large city of Cologne. Contrasting that, Nürburg has cooler weather year-round due to the higher elevation of the Eifel Mountains than the Rhine Valley.

Climate data for Nürburg, 485 m asl (1981–2010 normals)
Month	Jan	Feb	Mar	Apr	May	Jun	Jul	Aug	Sep	Oct	Nov	Dec	Year
Record high °C (°F)	13.5 (56.3)	15.6 (60.1)	20.7 (69.3)	25.8 (78.4)	30.4 (86.7)	33.3 (91.9)	34.9 (94.8)	36.0 (96.8)	30.2 (86.4)	25.2 (77.4)	18.8 (65.8)	12.6 (54.7)	36.0 (96.8)
Mean daily maximum °C (°F)	2.6 (36.7)	4.3 (39.7)	7.7 (45.9)	12.3 (54.1)	16.4 (61.5)	19.7 (67.5)	21.6 (70.9)	21.4 (70.5)	17.0 (62.6)	12.5 (54.5)	6.6 (43.9)	2.8 (37.0)	12.2 (54.0)
Daily mean °C (°F)	0.3 (32.5)	1.6 (34.9)	4.2 (39.6)	8.0 (46.4)	11.9 (53.4)	15.0 (59.0)	16.9 (62.4)	16.6 (61.9)	13.0 (55.4)	9.2 (48.6)	4.3 (39.7)	0.6 (33.1)	8.6 (47.5)
Mean daily minimum °C (°F)	−2.1 (28.2)	−1.2 (29.8)	0.7 (33.3)	3.6 (38.5)	7.4 (45.3)	10.1 (50.2)	12.2 (54.0)	11.9 (53.4)	9.0 (48.2)	5.9 (42.6)	2.0 (35.6)	−1.6 (29.1)	4.9 (40.8)
Record low °C (°F)	−18.6 (−1.5)	−17.4 (0.7)	−12.4 (9.7)	−6.4 (20.5)	−1.0 (30.2)	2.1 (35.8)	5.0 (41.0)	3.6 (38.5)	1.1 (34.0)	−5.3 (22.5)	−10.8 (12.6)	−18.1 (−0.6)	−18.6 (−1.5)
Average precipitation mm (inches)	48.0 (1.89)	51.2 (2.02)	50.6 (1.99)	47.4 (1.87)	60.6 (2.39)	53.8 (2.12)	68.9 (2.71)	77.7 (3.06)	57.0 (2.24)	54.1 (2.13)	57.5 (2.26)	51.5 (2.03)	678.3 (26.71)
Average precipitation days	9.5	10.6	10.9	9.4	9.9	9.8	11.4	9.5	9.6	10.5	12.0	10.8	123.9
Mean monthly sunshine hours	56.7	72.1	116.6	166.9	187.0	205.3	204.4	193.3	147.1	105.7	46.5	43.0	1,544.6
Source: Météo Climat

== Gallery ==
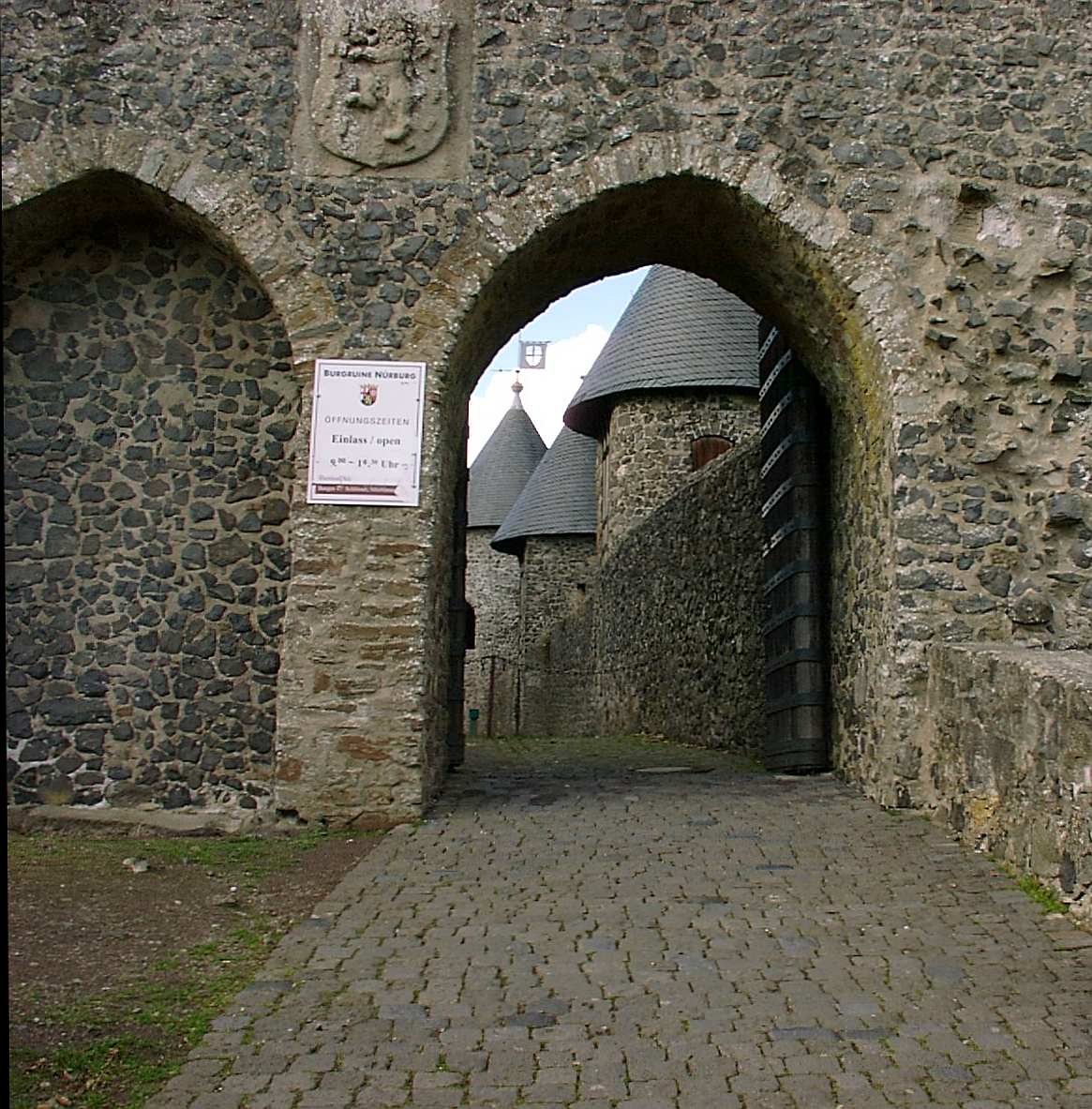
Nürburg Castle entry

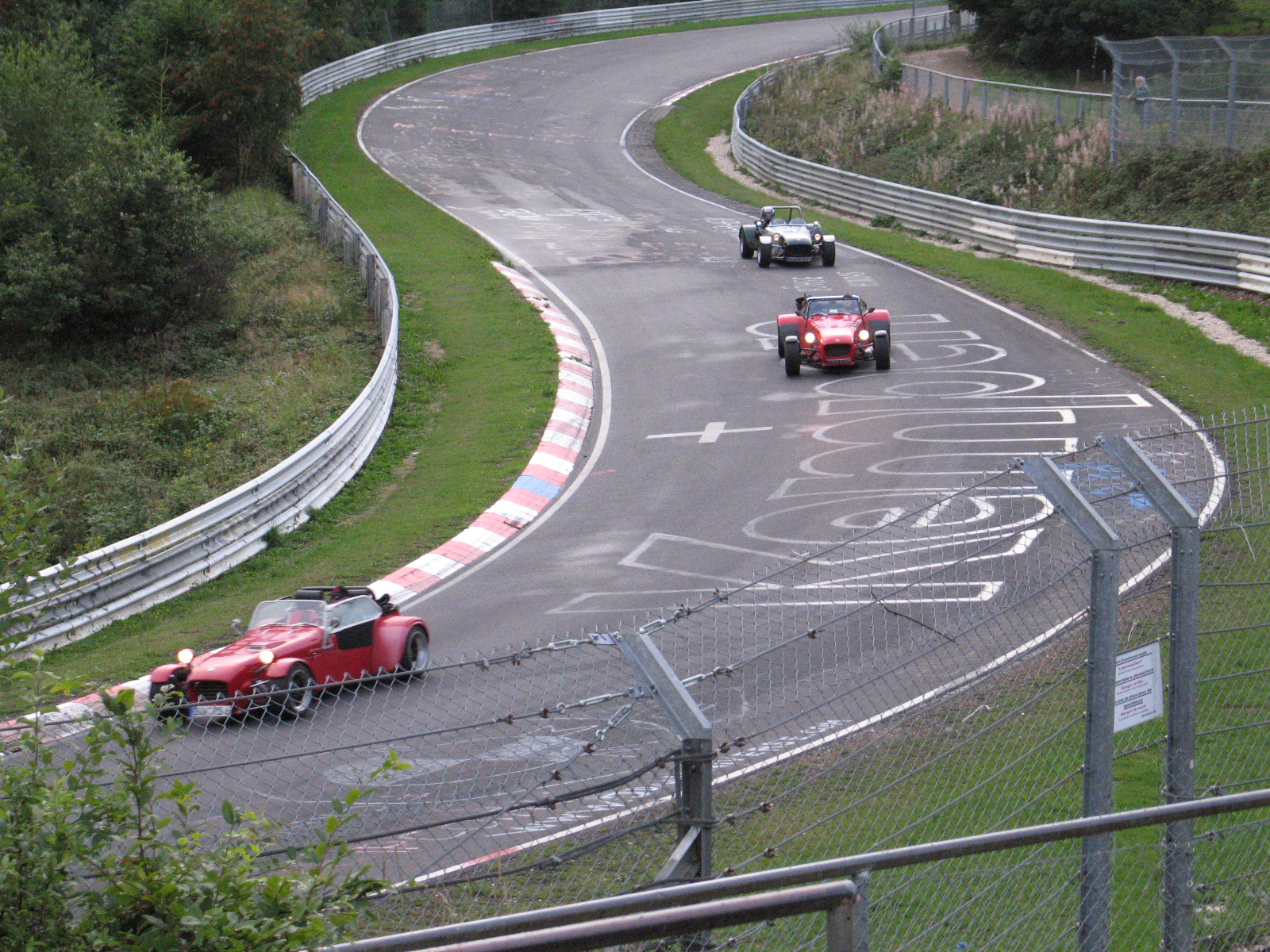
The nearby Nürburgring race track
