= Zwinger =

Area between main and secondary walls of a fortification

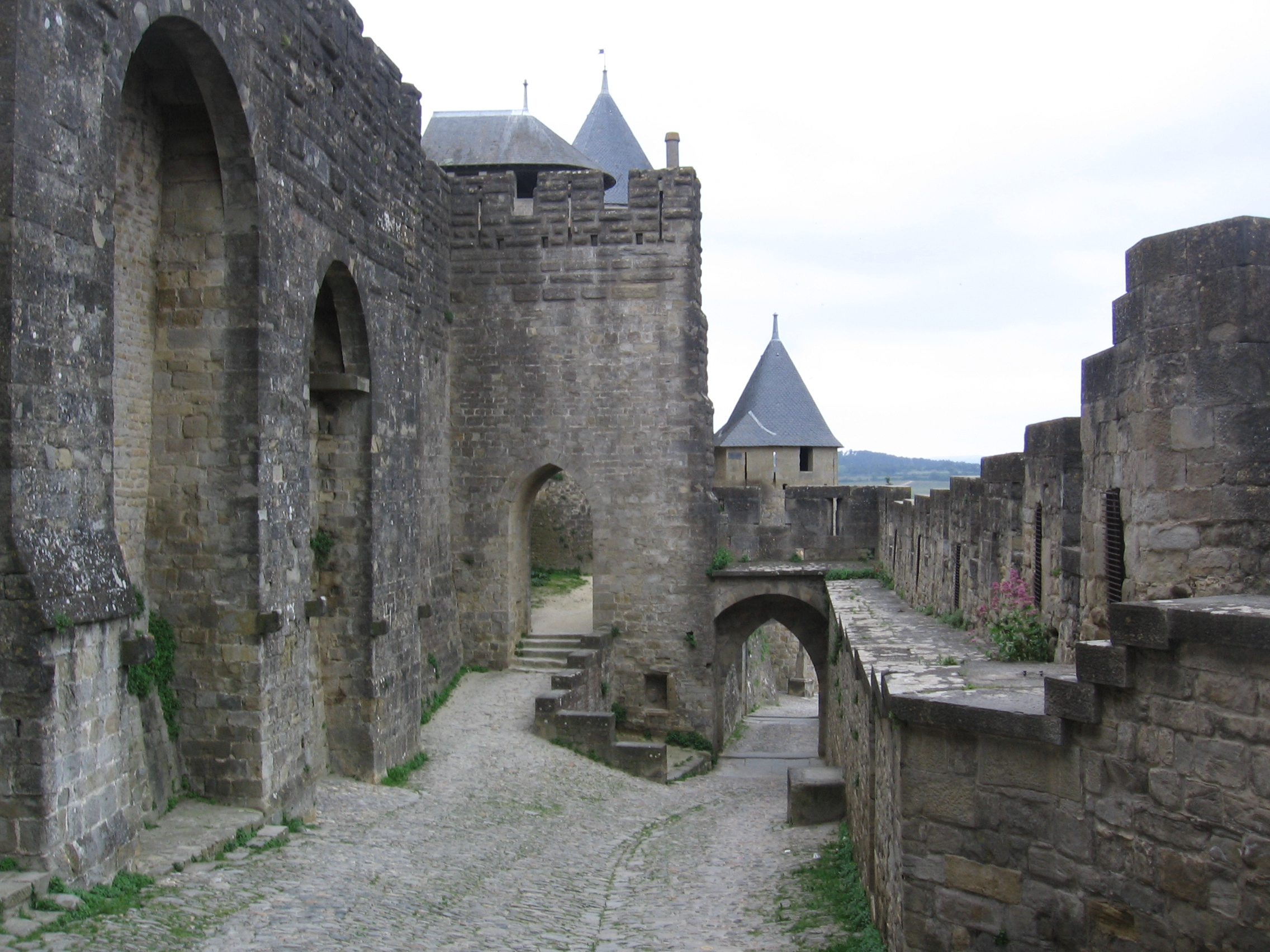
Gateway leading into the Zwinger in Carcassonne. Right: the lower Zwinger wall.

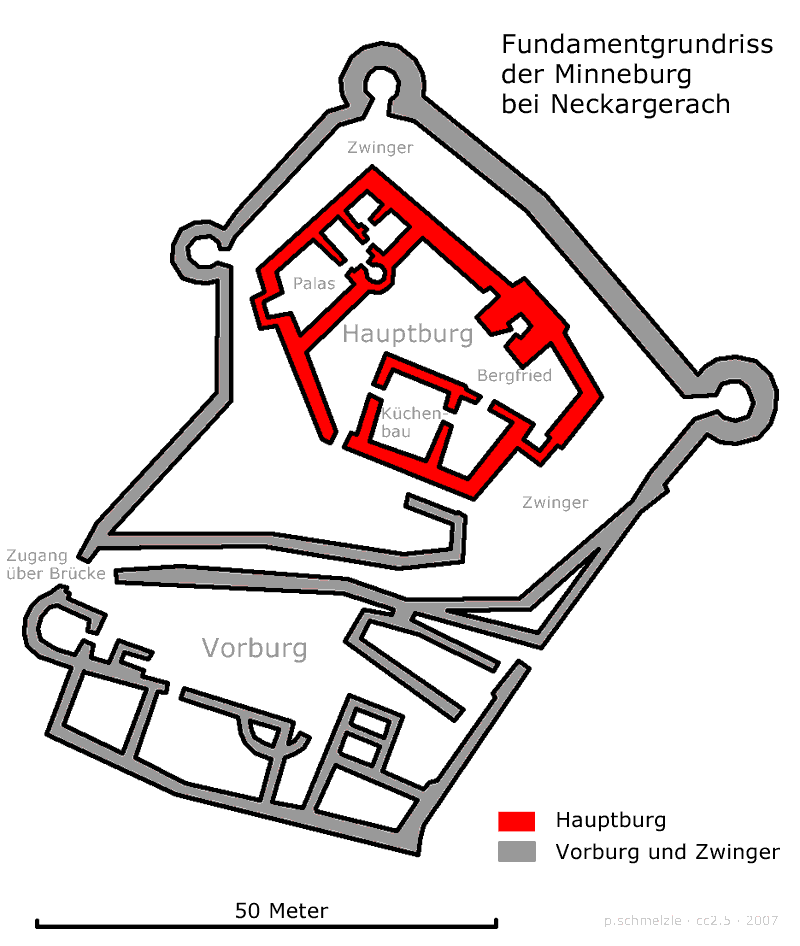
Example of a Zwinger: the Minneburg in the Odenwald

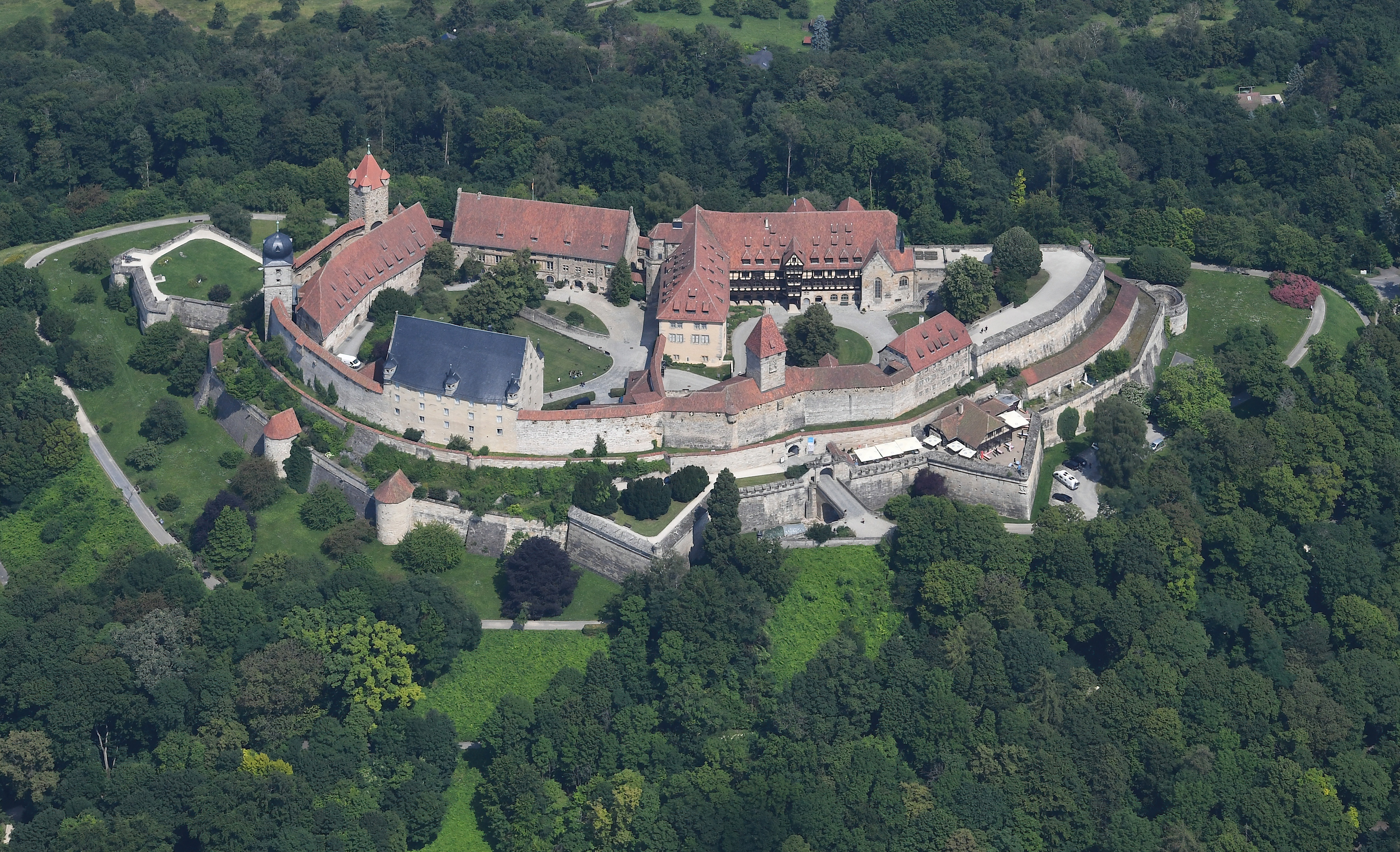
The Zwinger around Coburg Fortress reinforced by early modern era bastions

A Zwinger (Note: As a German noun it is capitalized, but can be written lower case when used as an English common noun.) (German pronunciation: [ˈt͡svɪŋɐ]) is an open kill zone area between two defensive walls that is used for defensive purposes. Zwingers were built in the medieval and early modern periods to improve the defence of castles and town walls. The term is usually left untranslated, but is sometimes rendered as "outer courtyard", presumably referring to the subsequent role of a Zwinger as a castle's defences became redundant and it was converted into a palace or schloss; however, this belies its original purpose as a form of killing ground for the defence. The word is linked with zwingen, "to force", perhaps because the Zwinger forced an enemy to negotiate it before assaulting the main defensive line. Essenwein states that the "main purpose of this feature was so that the besieging force could not reach the actual castle wall very easily with battering rams or belfries, but had to stop at the lower, outer wall; also that two ranks of archers, behind and above one another, could fire upon the approaching enemy".

In the territories of the Teutonic Order the terms Parkam or Parcham were used instead of Zwinger. These were related to the words Park ("park") and Pferch ("pen").

== Castles ==
The Zwinger of a castle is sited in front of the main curtain wall and is enclosed on the outer side by a second, lower wall, known as the Zwinger wall (Zwingermauer). If attackers succeed in getting past the Zwinger wall, they would be trapped in the Zwinger and were an easy target for the defenders on the main wall (Hauptmauer). Further progress was thus seriously impeded.

In central Europe most Zwingers were built in front of older castle walls as a later addition and reinforcement of the defences.

== Town fortifications ==
The Zwinger in front of a town gate is a fortified area between the main gate and the outer gate of a medieval town gateway system. Town gates were often built in the shape of a gate tower, with a second, and sometimes even a third, gate in front of it (so-called double or triple gate systems). In front of the town walls in the area of the town gates there was usually a second wall in which the outer gate was located. An enemy who had breached the outer gate and penetrated the Zwinger would find himself in an enclosed area with very little scope to exploit his initial success. By contrast, the defenders retreating behind the main town walls could easily engage the enemy below them in the killing ground of the Zwinger.

The barbican is based on a similar concept to the gateway Zwinger and is found in front of the main wall but separated from it by an additional moat.

In the Hussite period (around 1420/30) impressive examples were built that were mainly intended as protection against early firearms.

The open area of the Zwinger was mainly used in peacetime to keep animals or as a garden. As their defensive function became superfluous, in many cases barns, stables and storage buildings were erected in Zwingers.

The Zwinger at Dresden inherited its name from the old Zwinger in front of the Crown Gate (Kronentor) on the outer wall of the fortress. It was never intended as a fortification, however, but was conceived as the outer courtyard of a new palace.

== Development ==
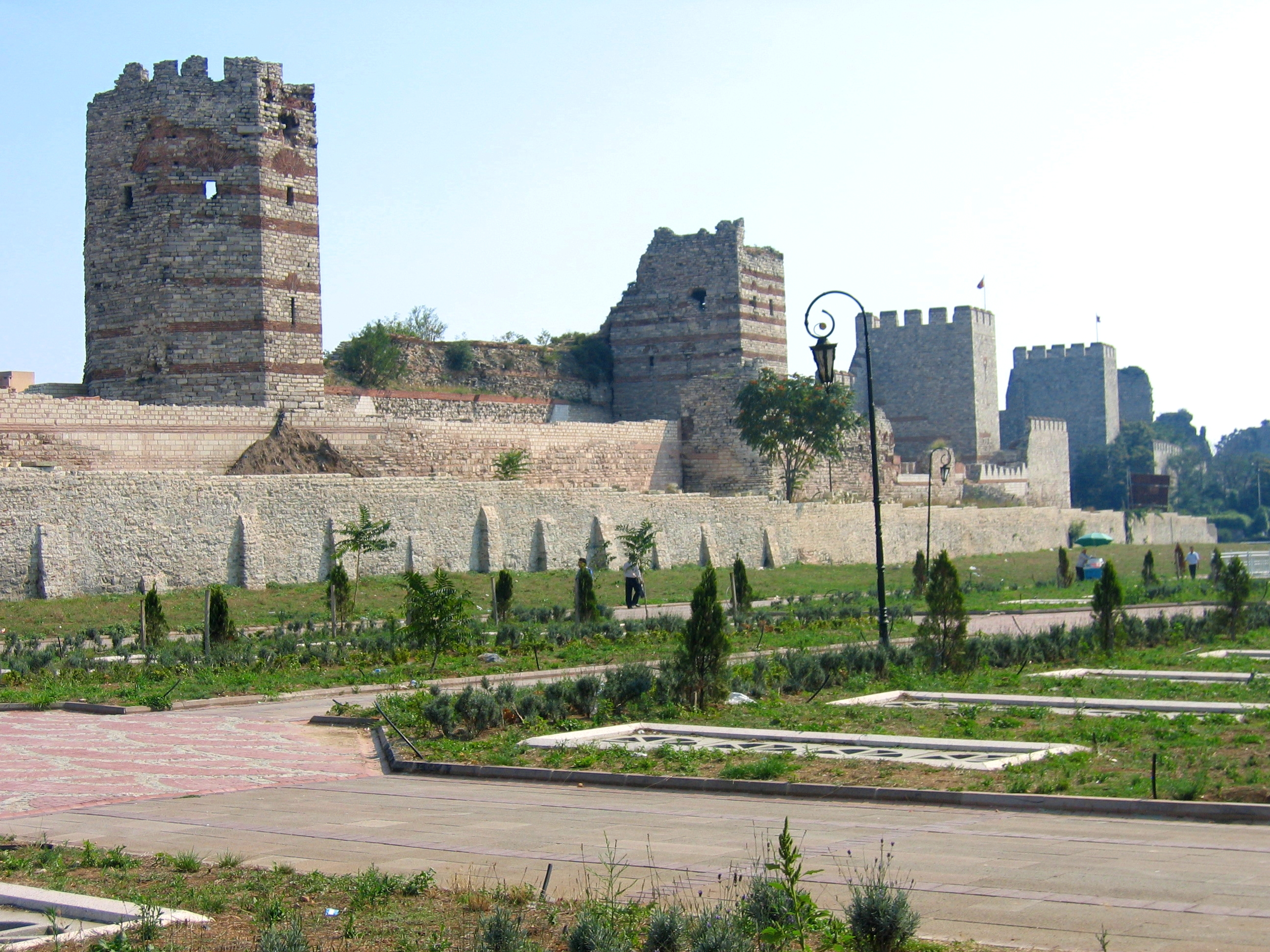
Part view of the Theodosian Wall of the former city of Constantinople. In the foreground: the double Zwinger.

The development of the Zwinger has not been well researched to date. By the fifth century A.D. a fully developed Zwinger had been built in front of the Byzantine walls of Constantinople.

In early medieval fortifications, too, a succession of defensive walls can be seen. Especially during the time of the Hungarian invasions, defensive castles were protected by berms and outer ramparts to guard against the cavalry attacks of the Magyars. These were not Zwingers in the true sense of the word; often an intermediate moat separated the lines of defence. Such a moat is also frequently part of late medieval Zwingers.

Occasionally the narrow outworks of the Habsburg (Aargau) or of Alt-Bolanden (Rhineland-Palatinate), which date to the late 10th and early 11th centuries, are seen as early Zwingers. These fortification elements do not have any direct successors, however.

In central Europe Zwingers first reappeared in the first half of the 13th century in front of the ring-walls of small fortifications. Towards the end of that century, the defensive capability of castles was being enhanced in this way far more frequently, for example at Gnandstein Castle in Saxony; Château du Landsberg and Château d'Andlau in Alsace. In southern France the heavily restored Zwinger in the town fortifications of Carcassonne appears to have been built. Initially Zwinger walls were very close to the main wall.

In the 14th century, the first firearms caused a further growth in the number of Zwingers. Countless examples were built, especially during the 15th and 16th centuries. In Franconia the fortification of late medieval city has largely survived. In Nuremberg a low Zwinger was built in front of the older ring-wall. In the early 15th century, Munich was fitted with a new double ring of town walls, as depicted in the Nuremberg Chronicle. By connecting the inner and the outer ring – to be more exactly, the respective inner and outer (= lower) watch towers – with numerous party walls, a succession of zwinger segments soon encircled the place as a whole.

The first Zwinger walls of the High Middle Ages were usually not protected by towers. The artillery fortifications of the Late Middle Ages, by contrast, were defended by numerous flanking and, sometimes also, battery towers or roundels.

The Zwingers of a small group of castles in the Franconian Haßberge date to the Hussite period. As elsewhere the territorial lords were reacting to the serious threat of rebels from nearby Bohemia. These Zwingers at the castles of Altenstein, Rauheneck and Schmachtenberg have been well preserved. At Rauheneck Castle the defences are further strengthened by two bretèches. These features and hoardings (Kampfhäuser) may also be seen as part of other Zwingers.

The Hussite period additions of many castles in the endangered regions often went back to innovations that had been developed by the Hussites themselves. A prime example is the town fortification of the south Bohemian Hussite town of Tábor. Parts of the Zwinger in front of the main gate have survived even today.

In general the Zwinger walls were markedly lower and less thick that the actual ring walls. Often only a parapet wall was erected around the intended killing ground of the Zwinger. Occasionally a covered or open wall walk was built on the inside of the wall, as at Trausnitz Castle in Landshut. Even underground wall walks with embrasures for hand guns may be seen, for example, at Hochhaus Castle near Nördlingen.

Zwinger walls could fully surround a fortification or just a particularly vulnerable section. There is often a moat in front of them, the Zwinger wall also acting as the revetment of the moat. On hillside castles the Zwinger wall was a supporting wall and often very high to provide static stability of the whole site.

Frequently, small, hidden sally ports or posterns enabled direct combat with an enemy in the moat area. The actual Zwinger area was also often accessible through sally ports.

== Early high medieval Zwinger in the Holy Land ==
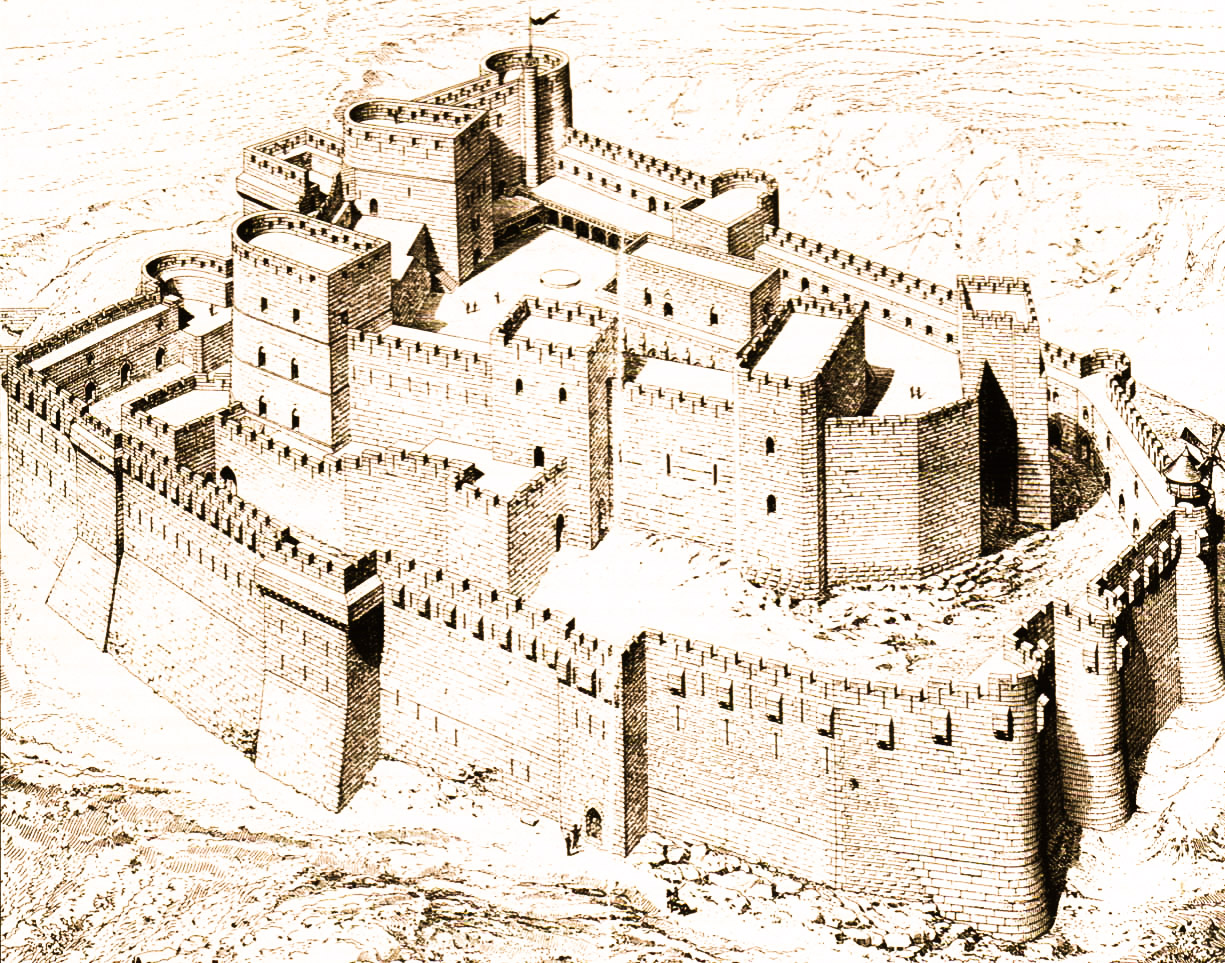
The Krak des Chevaliers with its extensive Zwinger system around the inner ward (artist's reconstruction from 1871)

The Krak des Chevaliers of the Knights of St. John is generally classified as a crusader castle. Just before 1170 the first small Zwinger was built here around the inner ward. This surprisingly early Zwinger was replaced in the mid-13th century by the present outer fortification. This Zwinger is also one of the oldest examples of its type. A building inscription records that the castle governor, Nicolas Lorgne, had a barbacane built – almost certainly a reference to the Zwinger. This source enables the second Zwinger of the Crac to be dated to around 1250. The Zwinger of the Krak des Chevaliers was extended in around 1270. Despite this reinforcement, the Muslims under Sultan Baibars I succeeded in capturing the fort in 1271, after just a four-week siege.

Other large crusader castles were also surrounded by great Zwinger systems. The outer ring wall of the castle of Tartus (Syria) could have been built at the same time as the Zwinger at Krak, i.e. in the middle of the 13th century. By shortly before 1168 the Knights of St. John began remodelling Belvoir Castle in present-day Israel. The outer fortification with its corner towers acts like "a large Zwinger to the structure" (U. Großmann).

== 13th-century double concentric walls in Wales ==
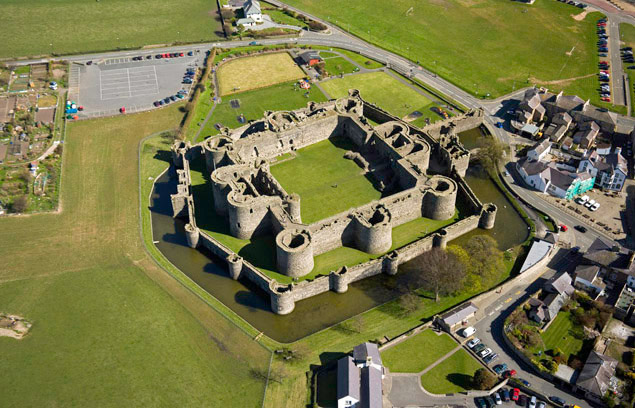
Castle site in Beaumaris

The Welsh castles of Harlech and Beaumaris (started 1295 but never completed) have a double defensive wall, the outer wing surrounding the inner one concentrically at a short distance from it. The outer fortification in Beaumaris, with its round wall towers, is particularly massive and comparable to the Krak des Chevaliers.

== Examples of surviving medieval Zwingers ==
=== Town and city fortifications ===
- Amberg
- Aschersleben
- Carcassonne
- Delitzsch
- Dinkelsbühl
- Ingelheim
- Jihlava
- Jüterbog
- Neubrandenburg
- Nördlingen
- Nuremberg
- Templin
- Warsaw
- Wolframs-Eschenbach

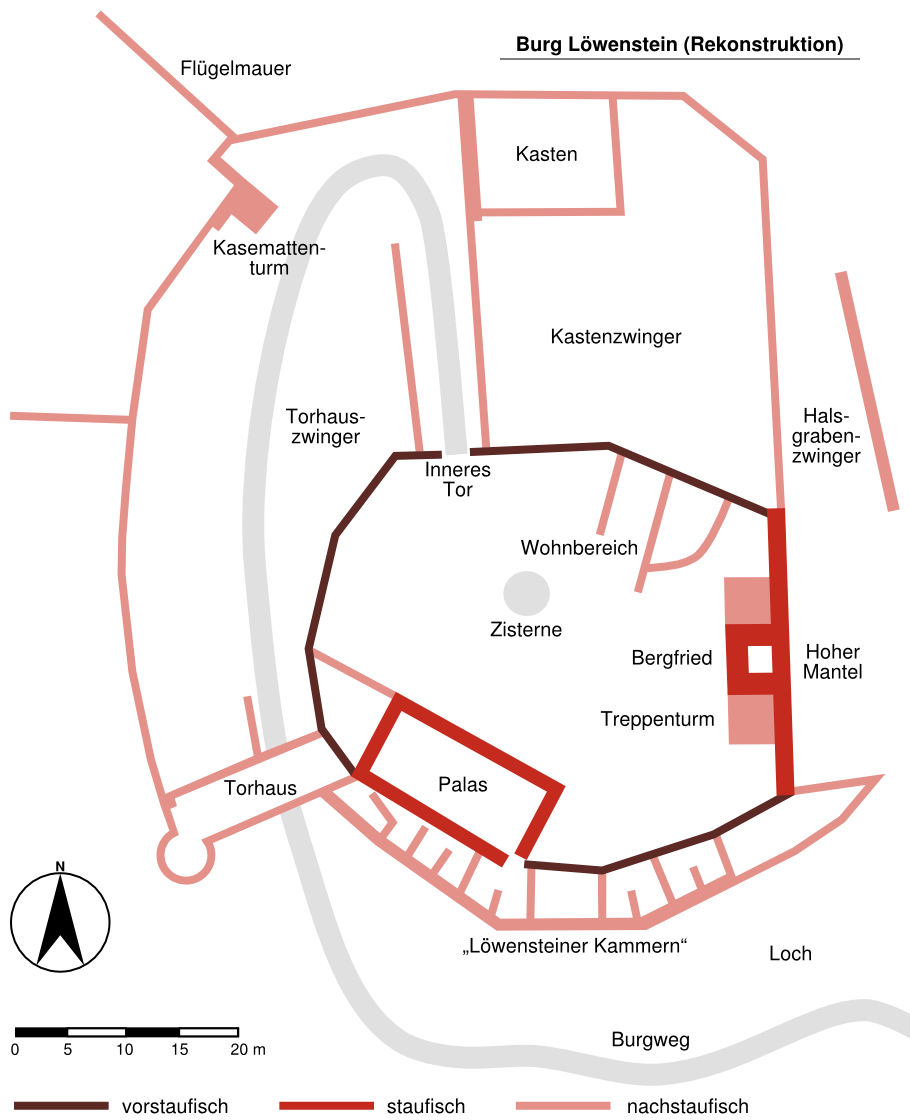
Inner ward and Zwinger of Löwenstein Castle (Württemberg)

=== Castles ===
- Altenstein Castle (Hassberge)
- Burghausen Castle (Burghausen/Salzach, Upper Bavaria)
- Giechburg (Upper Franconia)
- Guttenberg Castle on the Neckar (Neckar-Odenwald-Kreis)
- Hohenurach Castle (Swabian Jura)
- Hornberg Castle on the Neckar (Neckar-Odenwald-Kreis)
- Löwenstein Castle (Swabian-Franconian Hills)
- Minneburg (Odenwald)
- Nürburg Castle (Eifel)
- Otzberg Fortress (Otzberg)
- Rauheneck Castle (Ebern)
- Turaida Castle (Turaida)
- Tower of London (London)

== See also ==
- Zingel

== Literature ==
- Ettel, Peter, Anne-Marie Flambard Héricher and T. E. McNeill, eds. (2002). "Actes du Colloque International: de Maynooth (Irland), 23 - 30 août 2002" in Chateau Gaillard 21. Caen: Crahm.
- Thomas Biller. Die Adelsburg in Deutschland. Entstehung, Form und Bedeutung. Deutscher Kunstverlag, Munich, 1993, ISBN 3-422-06093-6.
- Horst Wolfgang Böhme (ed.): Burgen in Mitteleuropa. Ein Handbuch. Vol. 1: "Bauformen und Entwicklung." Deutschen Castlesvereinigung e.V. Theiss, Stuttgart, 1999, ISBN 3-8062-1355-0.
- Horst Wolfgang Böhme, Reinhard Friedrich, Barbara Schock-Werner (ed.). Wörterbuch der Burgen, Schlösser und Festungen. Reclam, Stuttgart, 2004, ISBN 3-15-010547-1.
- Georg Ulrich Großmann. Burgen in Europa. Schnell & Steiner, Regensburg, 2005, ISBN 3-7954-1686-8.
- Michael Losse. Kleine Castleskunde. Regionalia, Euskirchen, 2011, ISBN 978-3-939722-39-7.
- Piper, Otto (1895), Burgenkunde, 1st edn. Munich: Theodor Ackermann.
