= Cross-wall =

Interior dividing wall

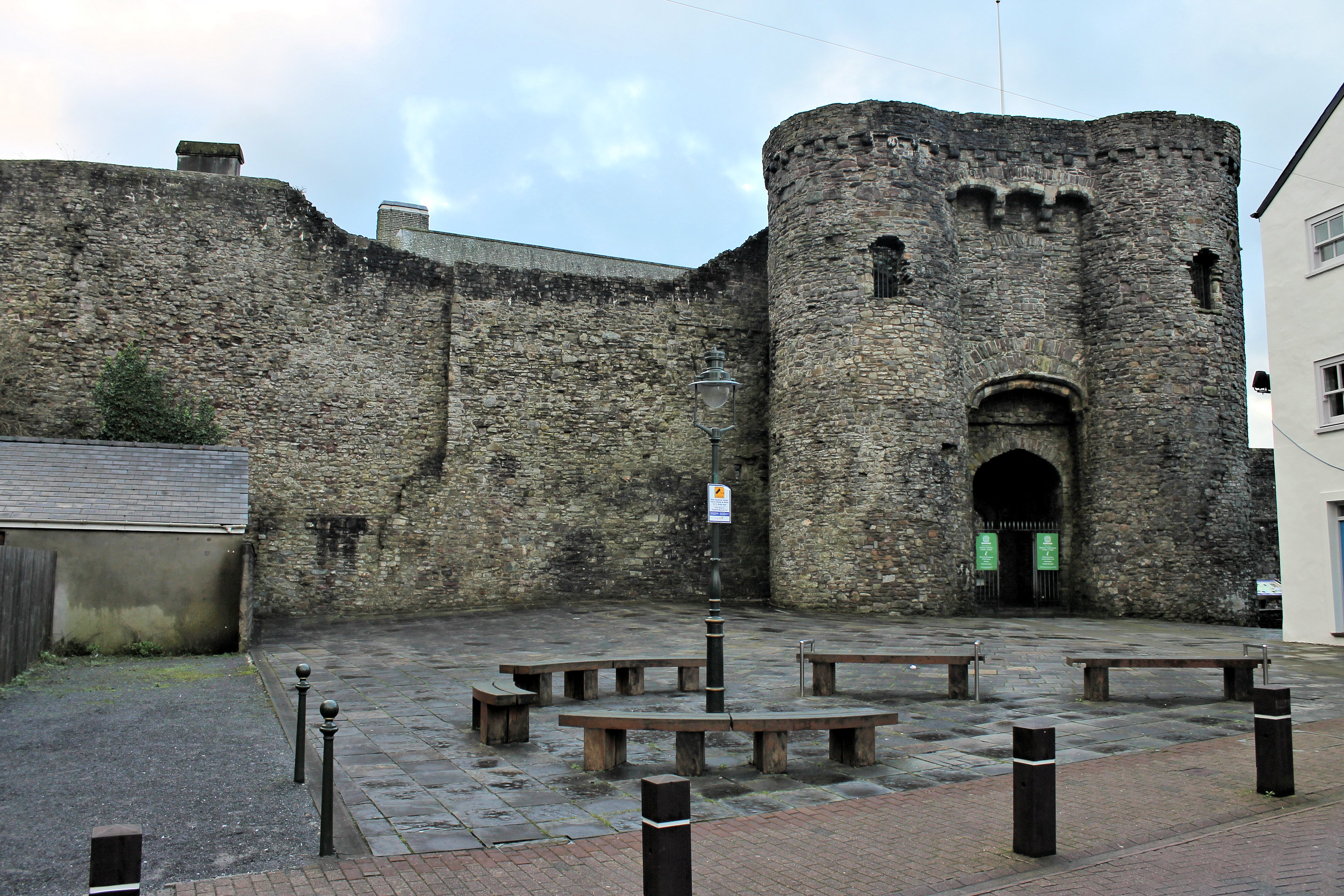
Carmarthen Castle

A cross-wall is an interior dividing wall of a castle. It may be an external wall dividing, for example, the inner and outer wards, or it may be a wall internal to a building such as the keep.

An example of the external variety is the great cross-wall separating the inner and outer baileys of Conwy Castle in Wales. At Rochester Castle in Kent, the cross-wall within the keep was used for protection when the castle was attacked in 1215.
