= Enceinte =

Main defensive enclosure of a fortification

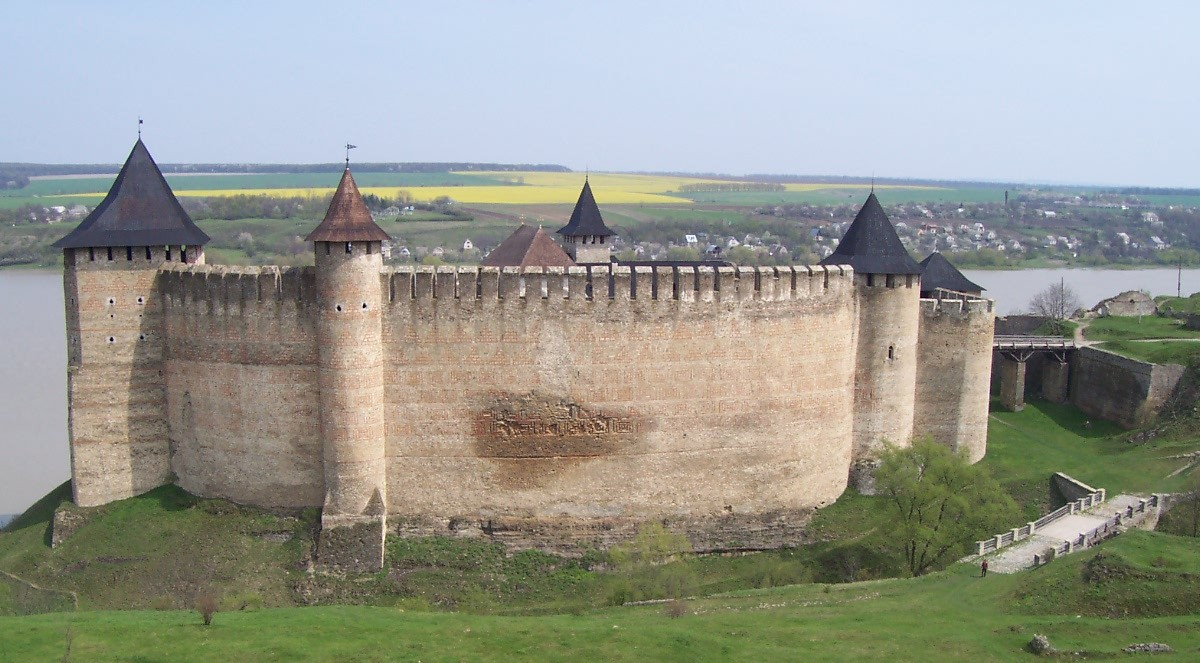
Enceinte of Khotyn Fortress in Ukraine.

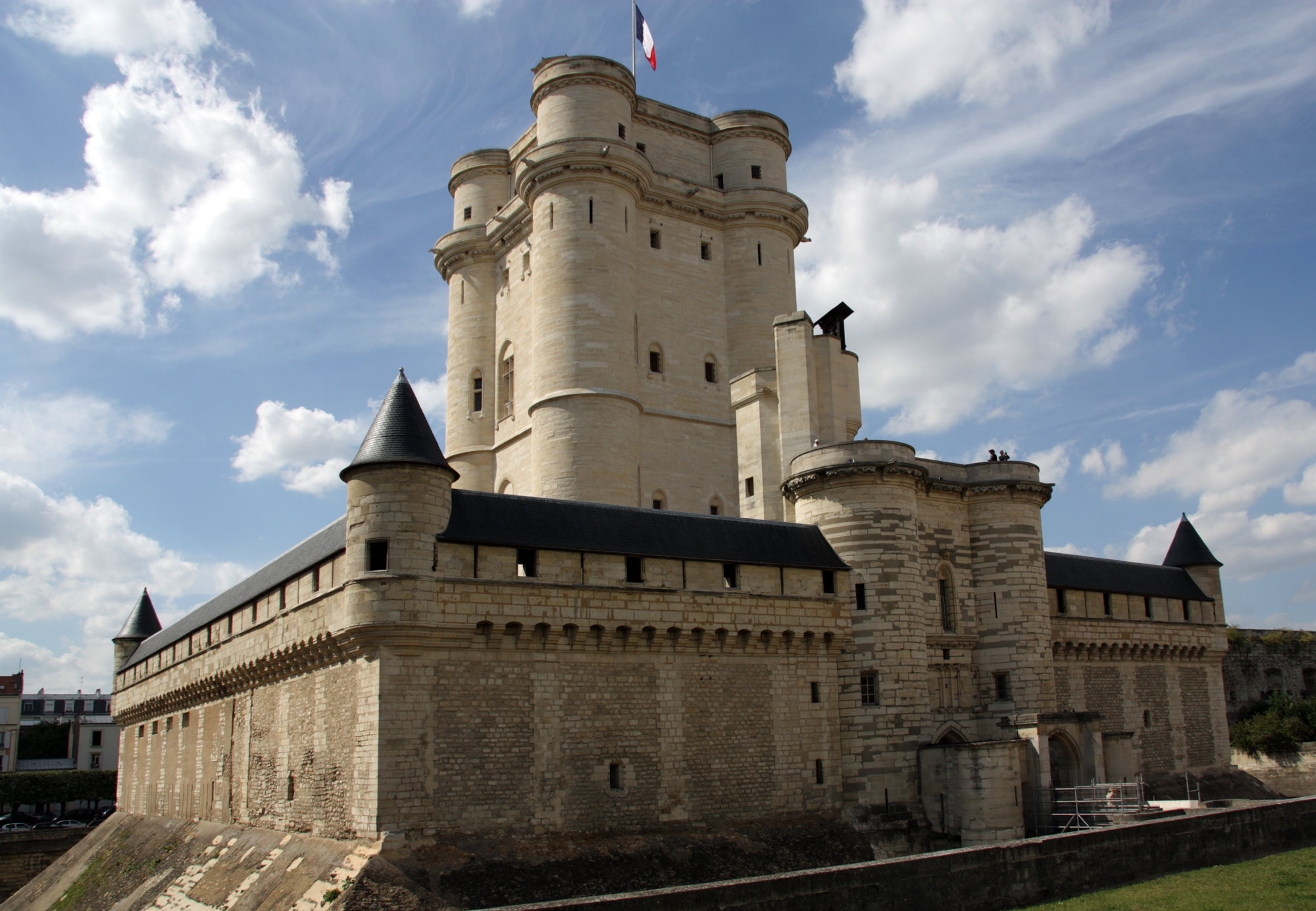
The keep of Château de Vincennes protected by its own isolated enceinte.

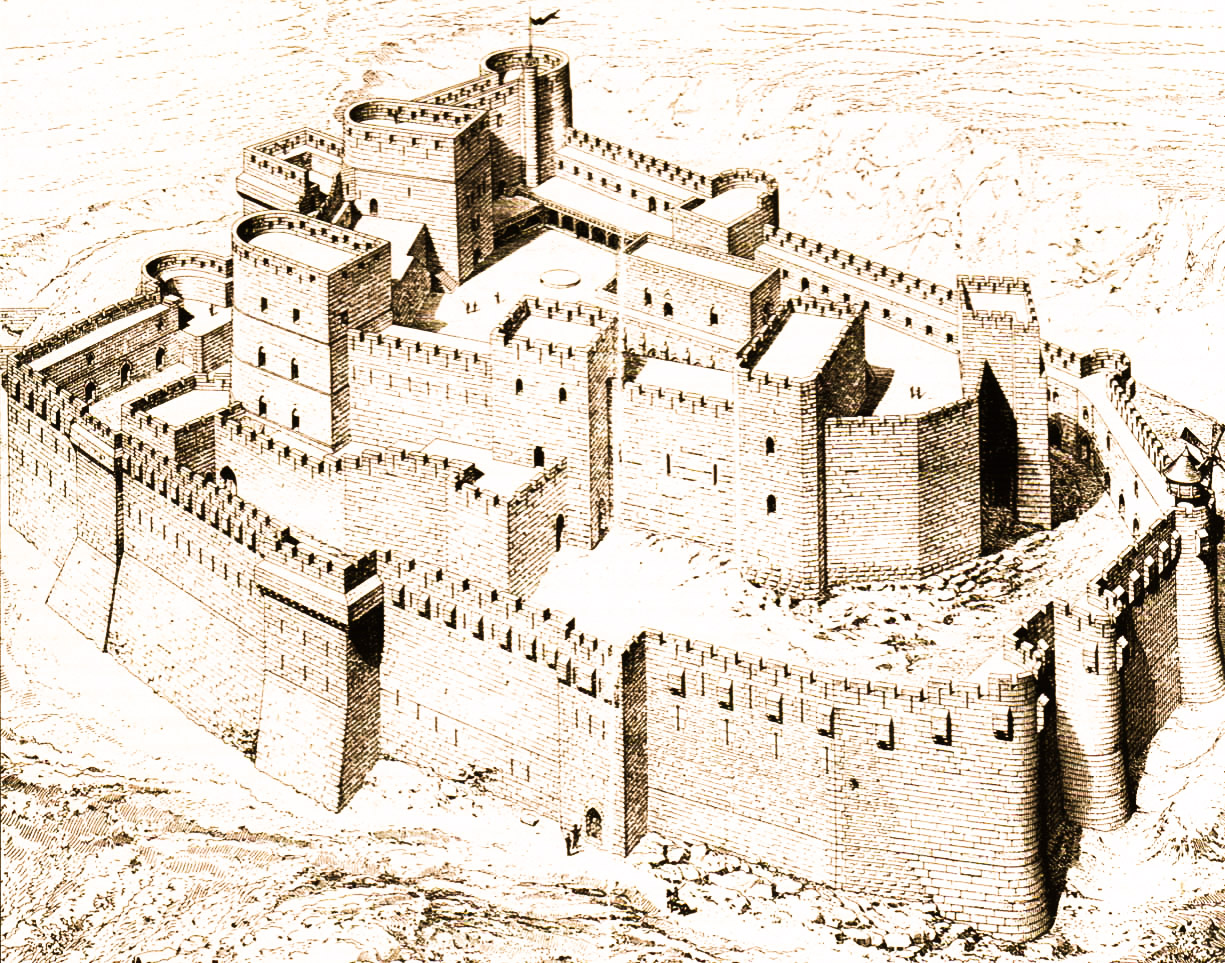
Krak des Chevaliers, a concentric castle.

Enceinte (from Latin incinctus "girdled, surrounded") is a French term that refers to the "main defensive enclosure of a fortification". For a castle, this is the main defensive line of wall towers and curtain walls enclosing the position. For a settlement, it would refer to the main town wall with its associated gatehouses, towers, and walls.

According to the 1911 Encyclopædia Britannica, the term was strictly applied to the continuous line of bastions and curtain walls forming "the body of the place", this last expression being often used as synonymous with enceinte. However, the outworks or defensive wall close to the enceinte were not considered as forming part of it. In early 20th-century fortification, the enceinte was usually simply the innermost continuous line of fortifications. In architecture, generally, an enceinte is the close or precinct of a cathedral, abbey, castle, etc.

This definition of the term differs from the more common use of enceinte as a French adjective, which means "pregnant".

== Features ==
The enceinte may be laid out as a freestanding structure or combined with buildings adjoining the outer walls. The enceinte not only provided passive protection for the areas behind it, but was usually an important component of the defence with its wall walks (often surmounted by battlements), embrasures and covered firing positions.

The outline of the enceinte, with its fortified towers and domestic buildings, shaped the silhouette of a castle. The ground plan of an enceinte is affected by the terrain. The enceintes of hill castles often have an irregular polygonal shape dictated by the topography, whilst lowland castles more frequently have a regular rectangular shape, as exemplified by quadrangular castles.

From the 12th century onwards, an additional enclosure called a Zwinger was often built in front of the enceinte of many European castles. This afforded an additional layer of defense as it formed a killing ground in front of the main defensive wall. Sometimes—depending on the size and type of the surrounding fortifications—several wall systems were built (e.g. as Zwingers) that could also be used to keep dogs, wild boar or bears, or even cattle in times of need. During the Baroque era it was not uncommon for these enclosures to be turned into pleasure gardens as for example in the Zwinger at Dresden.
