= Rauheneck Castle (Baden) =

Castle ruins in Lower Austria

Coordinates: 48.0062°N 16.2047°E

- Burgruine Rauheneck
- Lower Austria, Austria
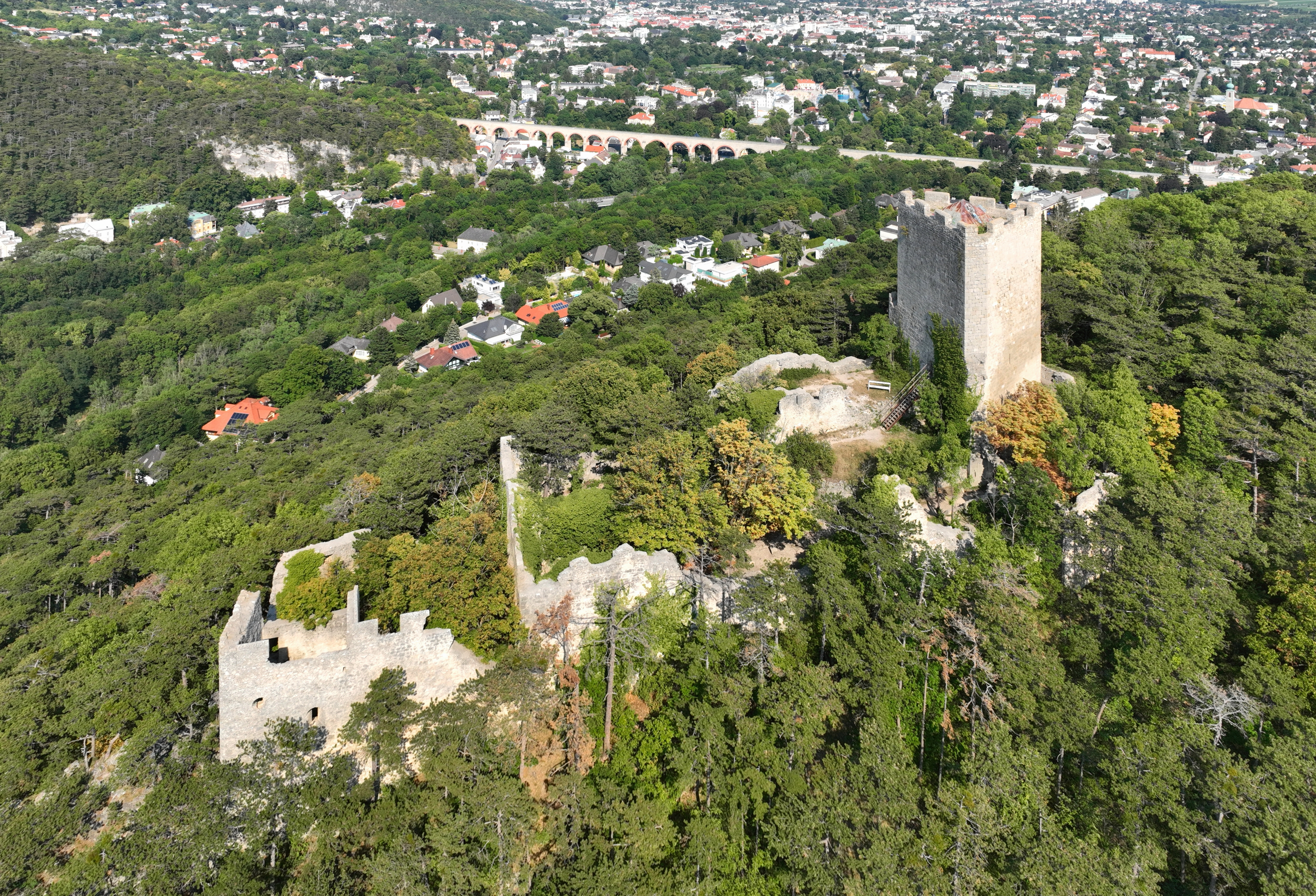
- West view of Rauheneck Castle

Site information
- Type: Castle

Rauheneck Castle (German: Burgruine Rauheneck) is a ruined castle in Lower Austria, Austria. It is 348 metres (1,142 ft) above sea level.

== See also ==
- List of castles in Austria
