= Riedbach =

- Municipality
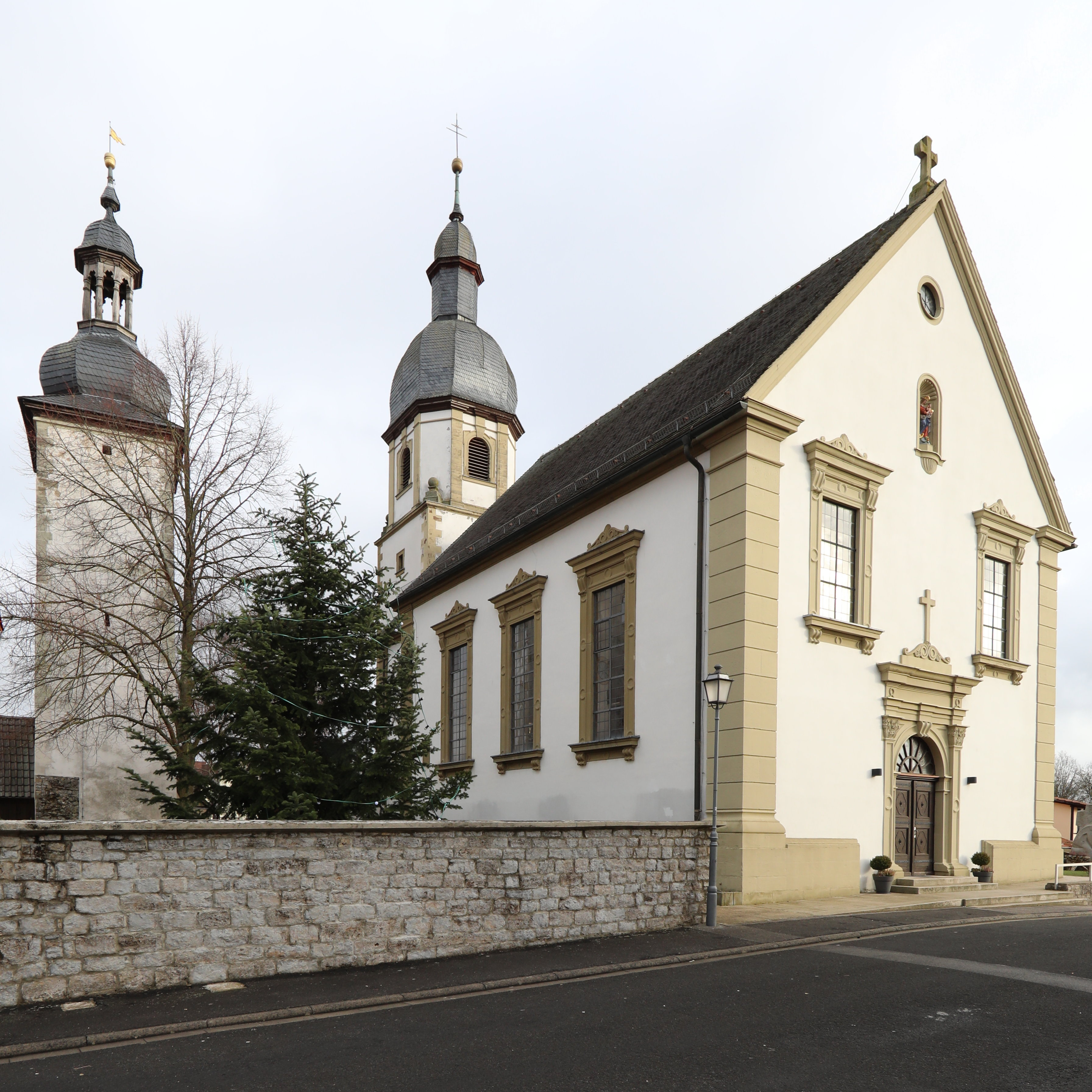
- Church of Saint Nicholas in Mechenried

- Coat of arms

- Location of Riedbach within Haßberge district
- Interactive map of Riedbach
- Location within Germany Location within Bavaria
- Coordinates: 50°06′N 10°26′E
- Country: Germany
- State: Bavaria
- Admin. region: Unterfranken
- District: Haßberge
- Municipal assoc.: Hofheim in Unterfranken

Government
  - Mayor (2020–26): Bernd Fischer (CSU)

Area
  - Total: 31.67 km^{2} (12.23 sq mi)
- Elevation: 285 m (935 ft)

Population (2025-12-31)
  - Total: 1,718
  - Density: 54.25/km^{2} (140.5/sq mi)
- Time zone: UTC+01:00 (CET)
  - Summer (DST): UTC+02:00 (CEST)
- Postal codes: 97519
- Dialling codes: 09526
- Vehicle registration: HAS
- Website: www.riedbach.de

Riedbach is a municipality in the district of Haßberge in Bavaria in Germany. It is situated 20 km northeast of Schweinfurt and 8 km north of Haßfurt.

The municipality was created in 1978. It encompasses the villages of Humprechtshausen, Kleinmünster, Kleinsteinach, Kreuzthal and Mechenried, and derives its name from the Riedbach creek that flows through Humprechtshausen, Kleinsteinach and Mechenried. The population of Riedbach is about 1600 people. Its mayor is Birgit Bayer.

== Villages ==
Humprechtshausen (521 Inhabitants)
Mechenried (461 Inhabitants)
Kleinsteinach (441 Inhabitants)
Kleinmünster (259 Inhabitants)
Kreuzthal (104 Inhabitants)

== Neighboring municipalities ==
Riedbach is surrounded by the municipalities (beginning north, clockwise) of Aidhausen, Hofheim in Unterfranken, Königsberg in Bayern, Haßfurt and Schonungen.

== History ==
In 1818, as part of the reformation of the Bavarian territories, the municipalities of Kleinmünster, Kleinsteinach, Mechenried and Humprechtshausen (with its district Kreuzthal) were created. On 1 May 1978 as part of another reformation of the Bavarian territories, the former municipalities formed the municipality "Riedbach".

=== Population ===
1910: 1.725 Inhabitants
1972: 1.902 Inhabitants
2005: 1.717 Inhabitants
2010: 1.625 Inhabitants

== Economy ==
Riedbach's main economy is agriculture, with 72 producers. Additionally, there are six construction companies and two kindergartens.
