= Pfarrweisach =

- Municipality
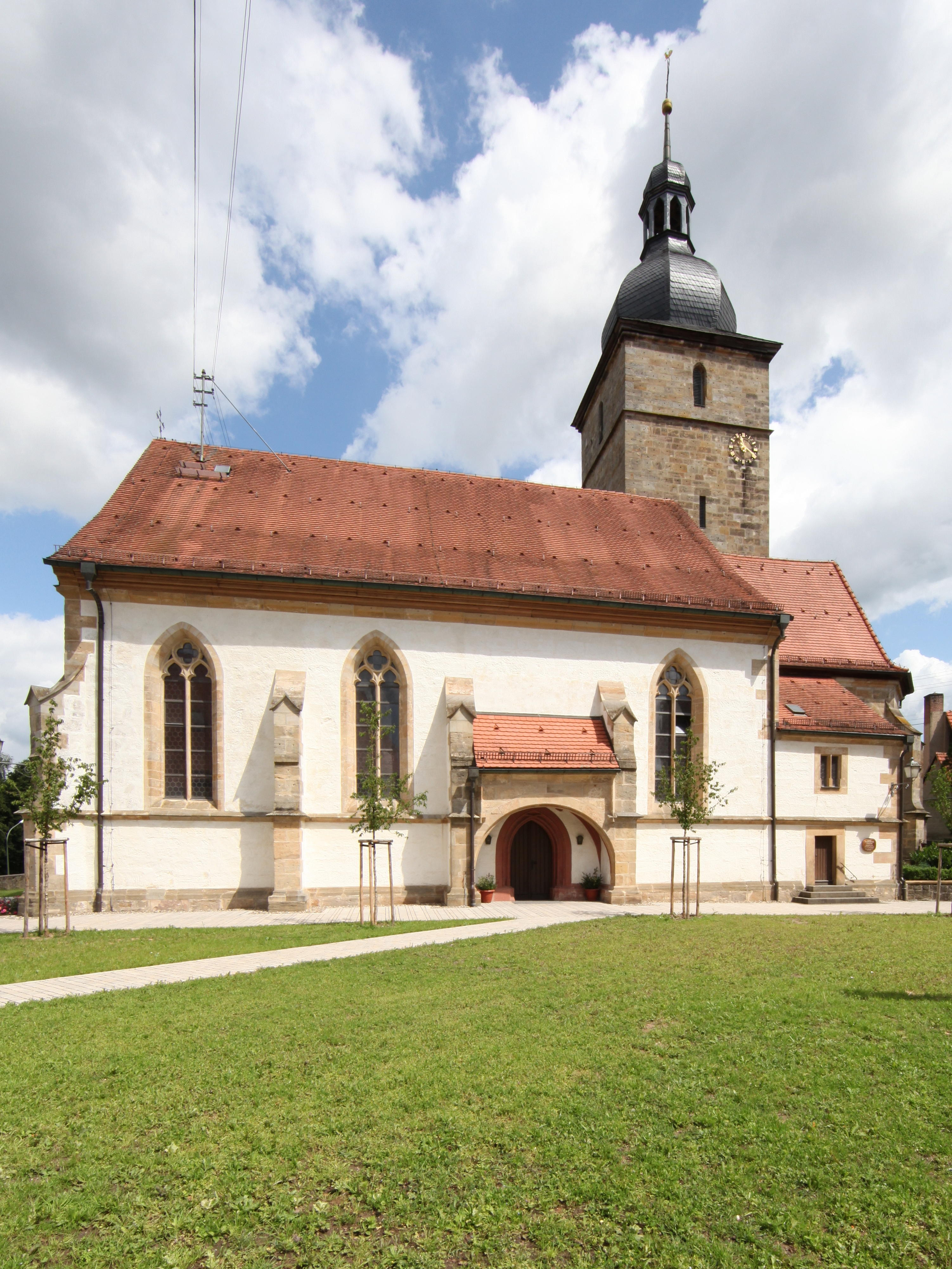
- Church of Saint Kilian

- Coat of arms

- Location of Pfarrweisach within Haßberge district
- Interactive map of Pfarrweisach
- Location within Germany Location within Bavaria
- Coordinates: 50°09′N 10°44′E
- Country: Germany
- State: Bavaria
- Admin. region: Unterfranken
- District: Haßberge
- Municipal assoc.: Ebern

Government
  - Mayor (2020–26): Markus Oppelt (CSU)

Area
  - Total: 28.43 km^{2} (10.98 sq mi)
- Elevation: 285 m (935 ft)

Population (2025-12-31)
  - Total: 1,430
  - Density: 50.3/km^{2} (130/sq mi)
- Time zone: UTC+01:00 (CET)
  - Summer (DST): UTC+02:00 (CEST)
- Postal codes: 96176
- Dialling codes: 09535
- Vehicle registration: HAS
- Website: www.pfarrweisach.de

Pfarrweisach is a municipality in the district of Haßberge in Bavaria in Germany.

== Geography ==
=== Location ===
Pfarrweisach lies in the Main-Rhön Region (Bavarian planning region no. 3).

=== Subdivisions ===
Pfarrweisach is divided into nine sub-municipalities (population in brackets as at: 5 January 2009):

- Dürrnhof (39)
- Herbelsdorf (15)
- Junkersdorf an der Weisach (231)
- Kraisdorf (321)
- Lichtenstein (98)
- Lohr (117)
- Pfarrweisach (602)
- Rabelsdorf (129)
- Römmelsdorf (29)

=== Neighbouring municipalities ===
Its neighbouring municipalities (clockwise from the north) are: Maroldsweisach, Seßlach, Untermerzbach, Ebern and Burgpreppach.
