= Haßfurt–Hofheim railway =

Former railway line in Germany

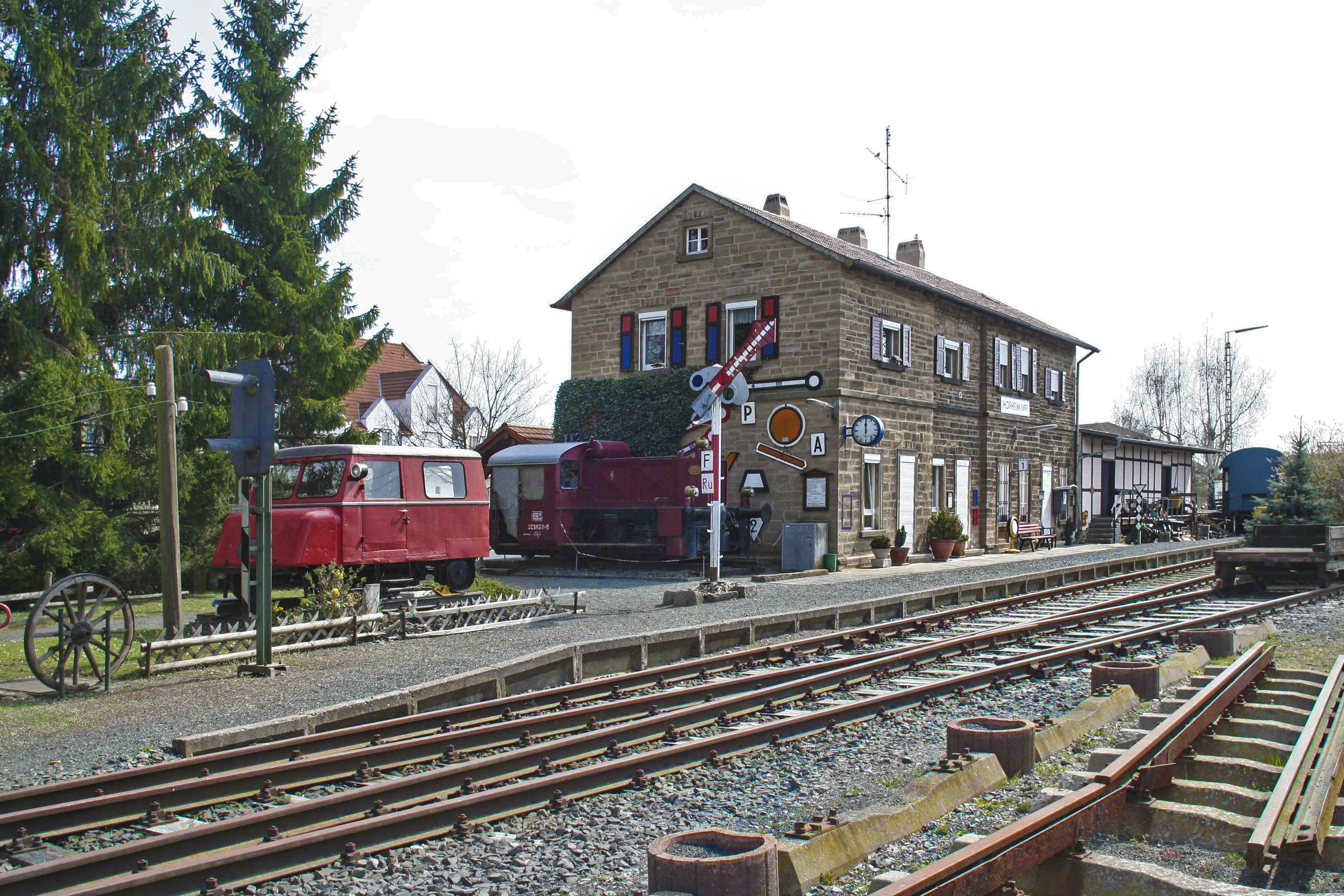
- Hofheim station

Overview
- Line number: 5232

Service
- Route number: 816

Technical
- Line length: 15,1 km
- Track gauge: 1,435 mm (4 ft 8 1/2 in)
- Maximum incline: 28,6 ‰

The Haßfurt–Hofheim railway was a single-tracked branch line in the Bavarian province of Lower Franconia in southern Germany. It was a good 15 kilometres long and ran from Haßfurt to Hofheim. In the local dialect the line was also known as the Hofheimerle. The railway was closed in 1995. The dismantling of the line was completed in 1997.

== History ==
On 1 August 1852 the railway arrived at Haßfurt with the establishment of Ludwig's Western Railway. But not until 40 years later, on 15 March 1892, was the 15.5 kilometre long Sekundärbahn ('secondary line') to Hofheim opened by the Royal Bavarian State Railways. The basis for the route was a state treaty between the Kingdom of Bavaria and the Duchy of Saxe-Coburg-Gotha, who guaranteed funding from the Saxon enclave of Königsberg as well as agreeing the route through its territory. As a result, the line was not built directly from Haßfurt to Hofheim along the river Nassach, but a more costly route, involving a diversion via Königsberg, was chosen. In 1965 the halt of Haßfurt-Gymnasium was built for the new grammar school there and for many years it provided a large number of passengers. On 24 September 1994 goods traffic ceased and on 31 July 1995 passenger services were also withdrawn. On 1 December 1995 the line was finally closed; it was dismantled by January 1997. The former station building at Hofheim now houses a small museum about the history of the railway.

== Traffic ==
To begin with two pairs of passenger trains worked the line daily. DRG Class 98.10 and, later, DRG Class 98.11 steam locomotives were used, amongst others. From December 1959 the Uerdingen railbuses were in regular passenger service. In 1976 there were eight pairs of trains on workdays, which had a journey time of about 24 minutes. For goods traffic, the DRG Class 86 was employed as well as diesel locomotives of DB classes V 100 and V 80.

== See also ==
- Royal Bavarian State Railways
- Bavarian branch lines

== Sources ==
- Andreas Kuhfahl: Nebenbahnen in Unterfranken . Eisenbahn-Fachbuchverlag Neustadt/Coburg, 2003. ISBN 3-9805967-9-6
