= Theres Abbey =

Monastery in Bavaria, Germany

Coordinates: 50°01′07″N 10°27′01″E

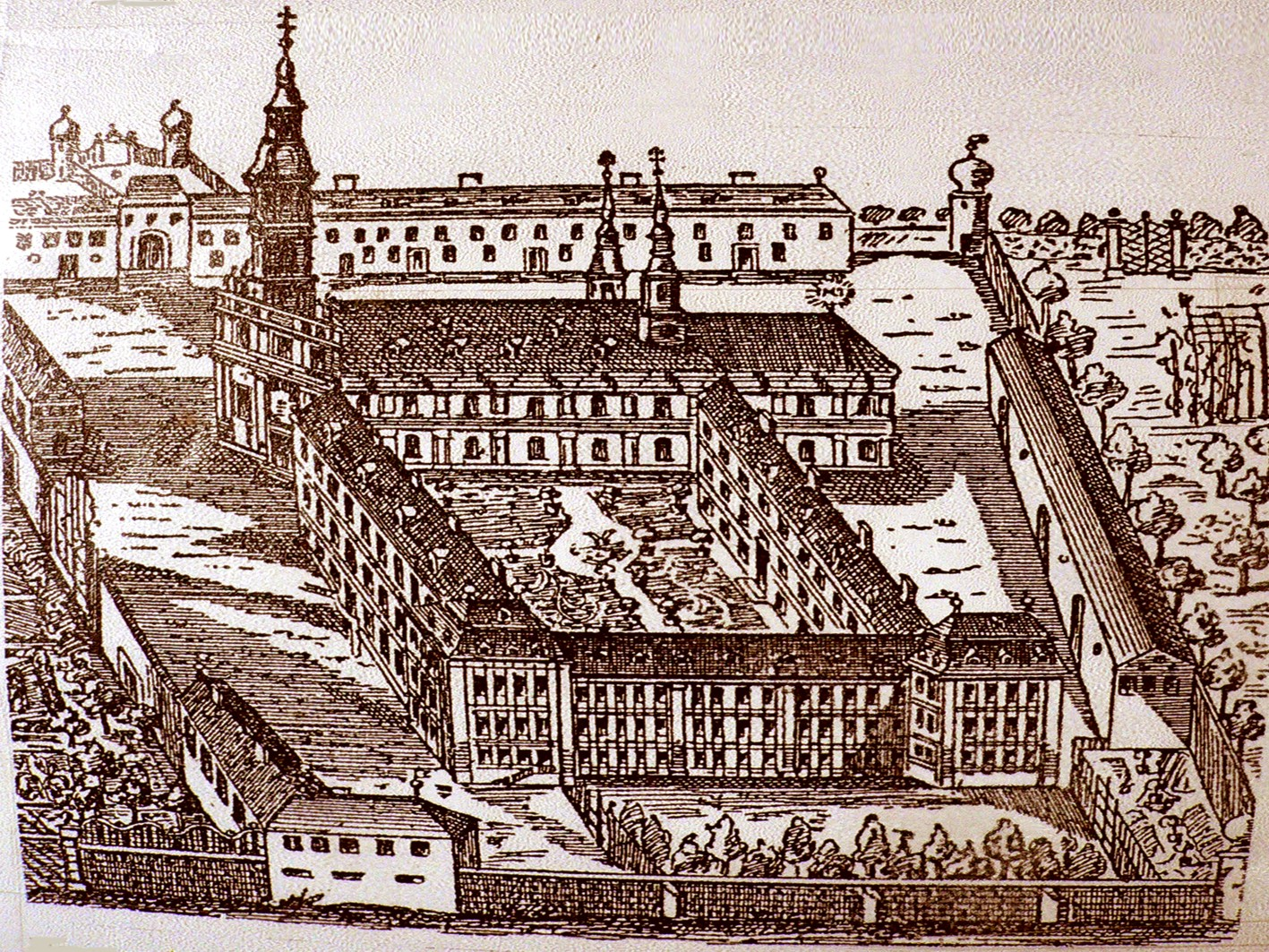
The abbey in the 18th century

Theres Abbey (German: Kloster Theres) was a Benedictine monastery in the village of Theres in the district of Hassberge, in Franconia in the north of Bavaria, Germany.

== History ==
The monastery, dedicated to Saint Stephen and Saint Vitus, was founded in about 1045 by Bishop Suidger of Bamberg. It was dissolved in 1802 during the secularisation of Bavaria.

== Buildings ==
The abbey buildings were acquired in 1804 by Theodor von Kretschmann, a government minister of Saxe-Coburg. The church was demolished in 1809. The remaining buildings were converted into a country house.
