= Stettfeld (disambiguation) =

Stettfeld is a German name.

- Stettfeld in Bavaria
- Stettfeld (Ubstadt-Weiher), part of Ubstadt-Weiher in Baden-Württemberg
