= Hofheim =

Hofheim may refer to one of these cities in Germany:

- Hofheim, Hesse (Hofheim am Taunus)
- Hofheim, Bavaria (Hofheim in Unterfranken)
