= Bundorf =

- Municipality
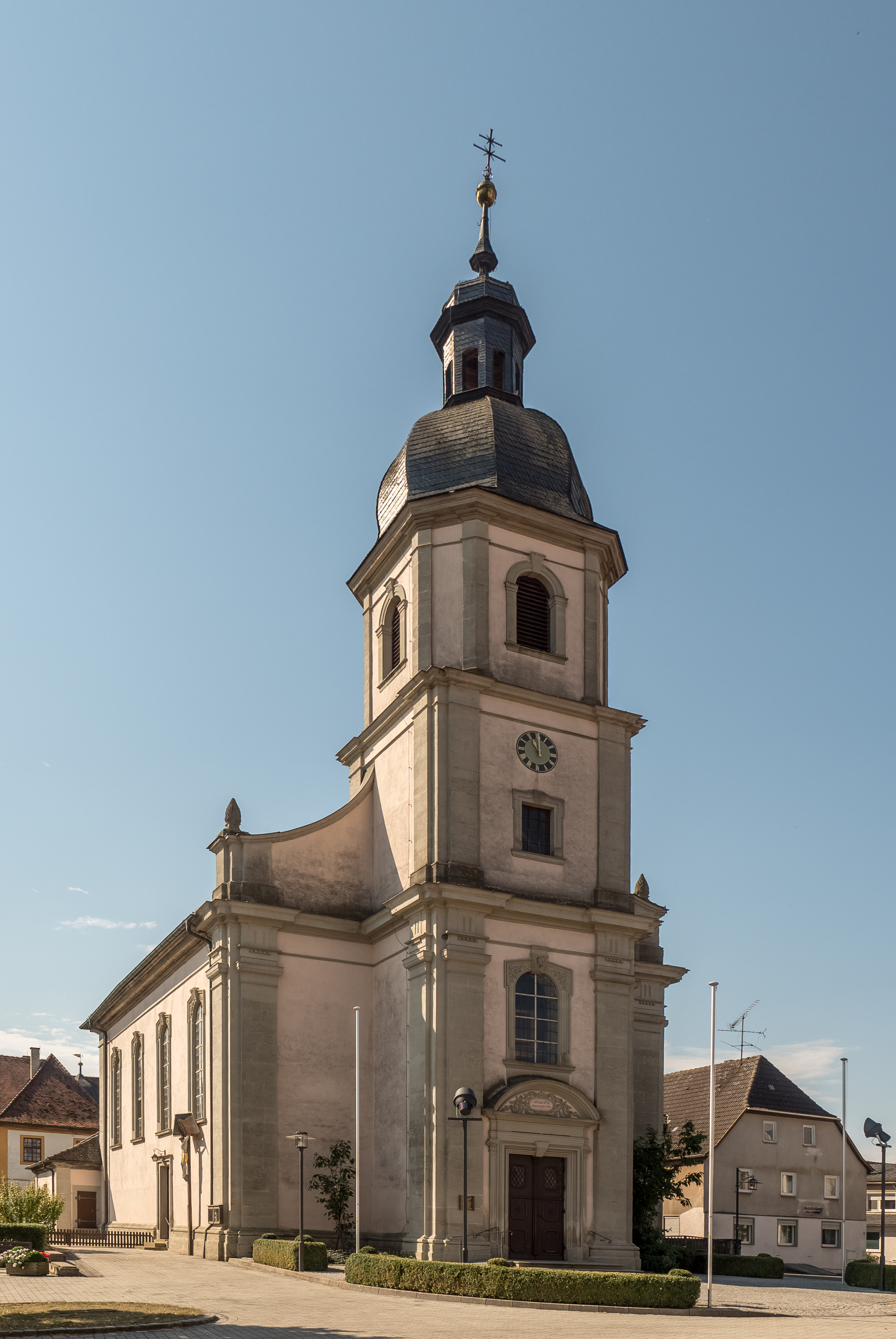
- Church of Holy Trinity and Saint Lawrence

- Coat of arms

- Location of Bundorf within Haßberge district
- Interactive map of Bundorf
- Location within Germany Location within Bavaria
- Coordinates: 50°13′N 10°31′E
- Country: Germany
- State: Bavaria
- Admin. region: Unterfranken
- District: Haßberge
- Municipal assoc.: Hofheim in Unterfranken

Government
  - Mayor (2020–26): Hubert Endres

Area
  - Total: 40.24 km^{2} (15.54 sq mi)
- Elevation: 326 m (1,070 ft)

Population (2025-12-31)
  - Total: 915
  - Density: 22.7/km^{2} (58.9/sq mi)
- Time zone: UTC+01:00 (CET)
  - Summer (DST): UTC+02:00 (CEST)
- Postal codes: 97494
- Dialling codes: 09763 bzw. 09523
- Vehicle registration: HAS
- Website: www.bundorf.de

Bundorf is a municipality in the district of Haßberge in Bavaria in Germany.
