= Nassach (Main) =

River in Germany

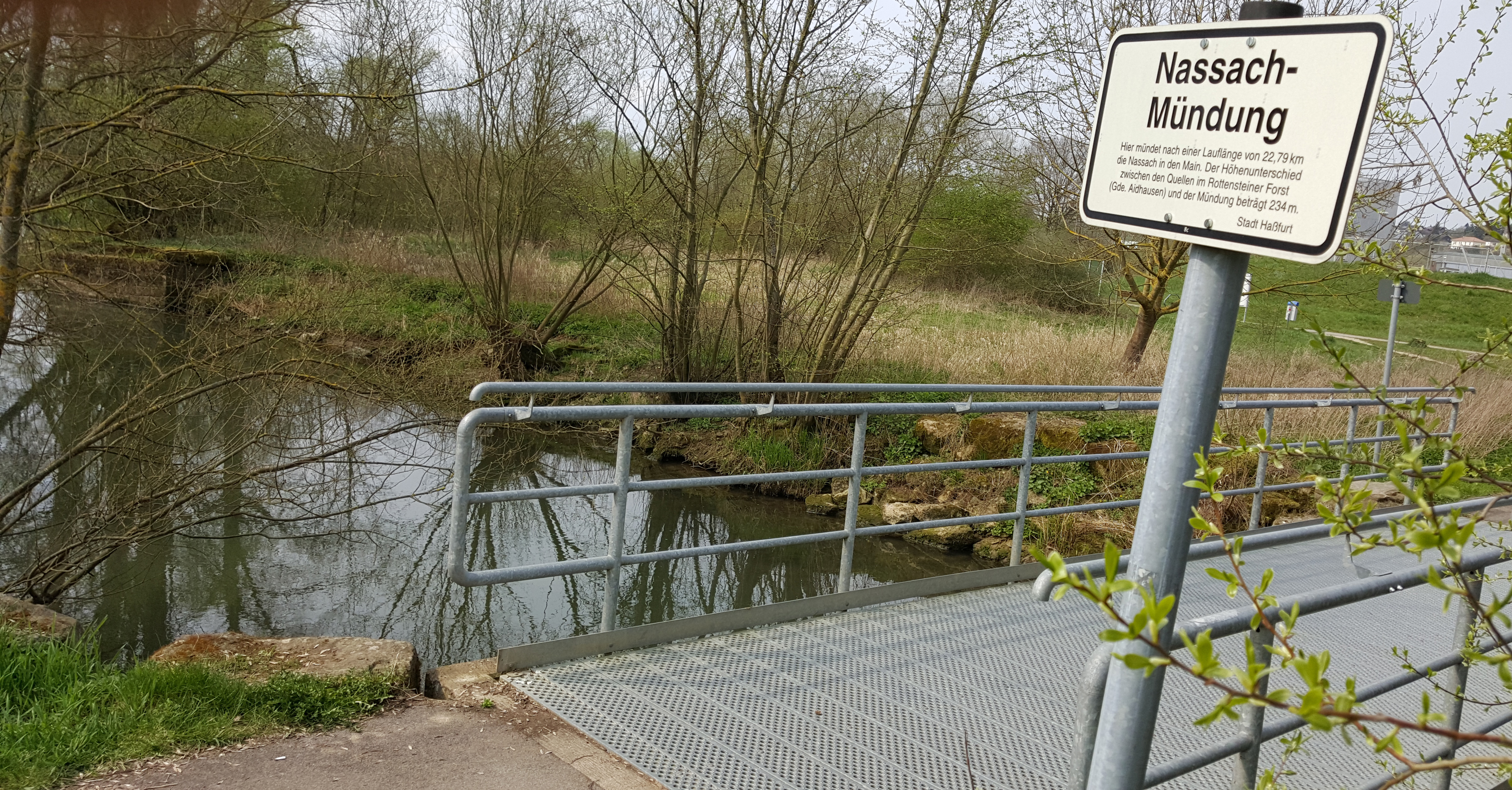
- The Nassau about 20 metres before its mouth

Location
- Country: Germany
- State: Bavaria

Physical characteristics
- Mouth
  - location: Main
  - coordinates: 50.0304°N 10.4961°E
- Length: 26.2 km (16.3 mi)

Basin features
- Progression: Main→ Rhine→ North Sea

Nassach is a river of Bavaria, Germany. It is a right tributary of the Main in Haßfurt.

== See also ==
- List of rivers of Bavaria
