= Ebelsbach =

- Municipality
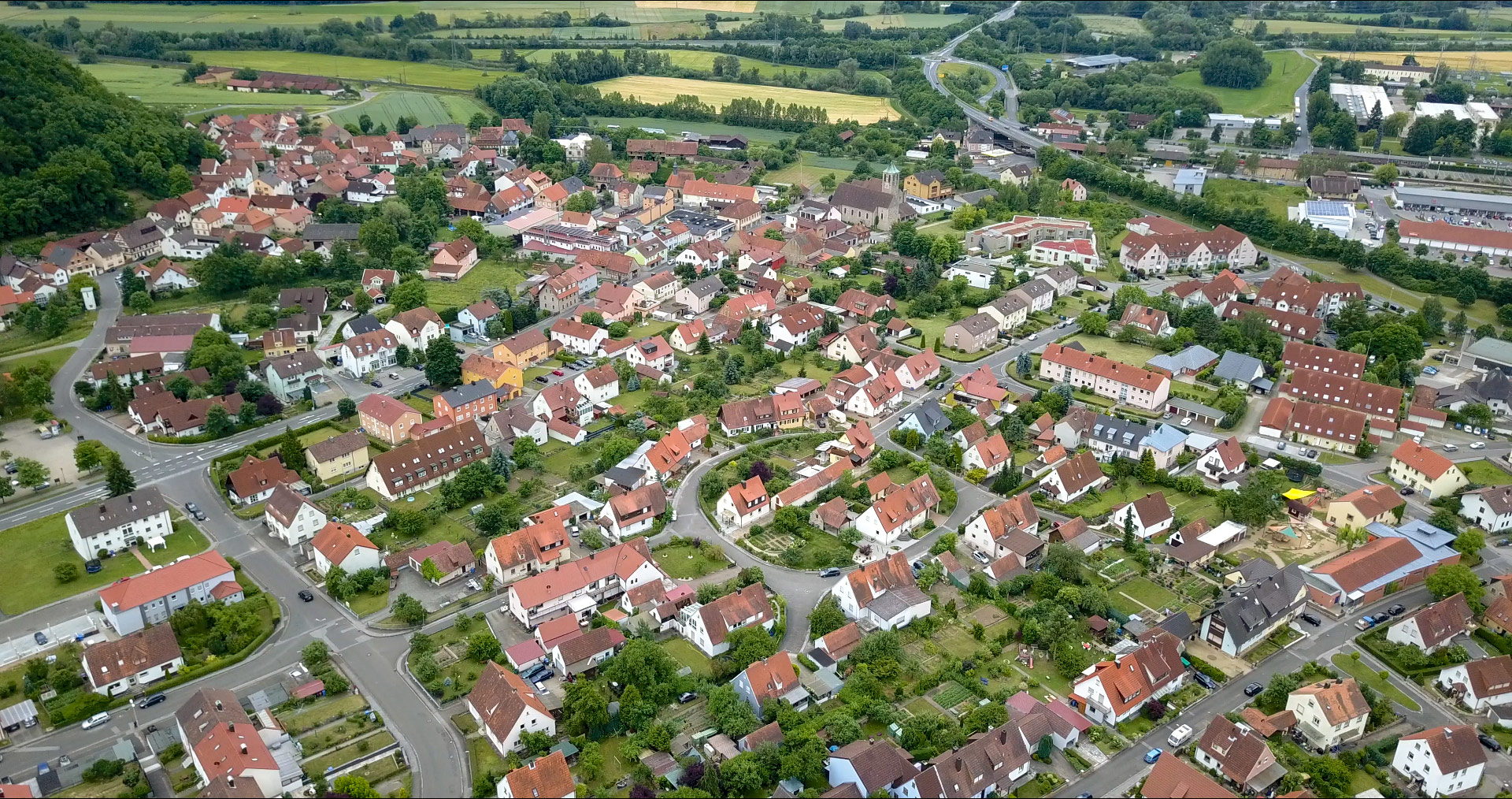
- Aerial view of Ebelsbach

- Coat of arms

- Location of Ebelsbach within Haßberge district
- Interactive map of Ebelsbach
- Location within Germany Location within Bavaria
- Coordinates: 49°59′N 10°41′E
- Country: Germany
- State: Bavaria
- Admin. region: Unterfranken
- District: Haßberge
- Municipal assoc.: Ebelsbach
- Subdivisions: 5 Ortsteile

Government
  - Mayor (2020–26): Martin Horn

Area
  - Total: 25.76 km^{2} (9.95 sq mi)
- Elevation: 228 m (748 ft)

Population (2025-12-31)
  - Total: 3,795
  - Density: 147.3/km^{2} (381.6/sq mi)
- Time zone: UTC+01:00 (CET)
  - Summer (DST): UTC+02:00 (CEST)
- Postal codes: 97500
- Dialling codes: 09522
- Vehicle registration: HAS
- Website: www.vg-ebelsbach.de

Ebelsbach is a municipality in the district of Haßberge in Bavaria in Germany.
