= Ebelsbach (Verwaltungsgemeinschaft) =

- Verwaltungsgemeinschaft
- Location of Ebelsbach within Haßberge district
- Interactive map of Ebelsbach
- Location within Germany Location within Bavaria
- Coordinates: 49°59′N 10°41′E
- Country: Germany
- State: Bavaria
- Admin. region: Lower Franconia
- District: Haßberge
- Seat: Ebelsbach
- Subdivisions: 4 municipalities

Area
  - Total: 66.23 km^{2} (25.57 sq mi)

Population (2025-12-31)
  - Total: 7,256
  - Density: 109.6/km^{2} (283.8/sq mi)
- Time zone: UTC+01:00 (CET)
  - Summer (DST): UTC+02:00 (CEST)
- Website: vg-ebelsbach.de

Ebelsbach is a Verwaltungsgemeinschaft (municipal association) in the district of Haßberge in Bavaria, Germany. Its seat is in Ebelsbach.

It consists of the following municipalities:

1. Breitbrunn
2. Ebelsbach
3. Kirchlauter
4. Stettfeld
