= Wolfgang Carl Briegel =

German organist, teacher, and composer (1626–1712)

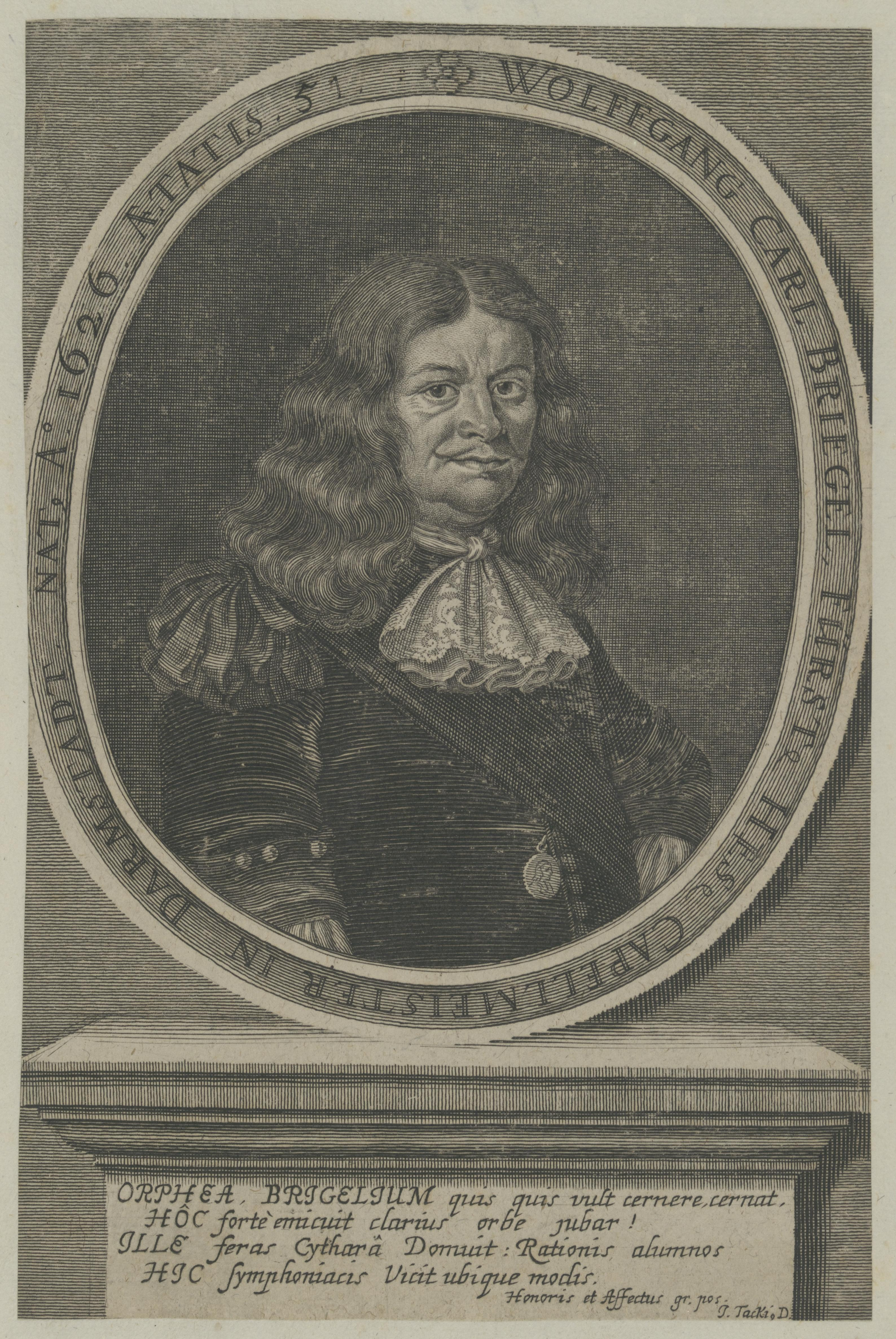
Wolfgang Carl Briegel

Wolfgang Carl Briegel (21 May 1626 – 19 November 1712, Darmstadt) was a German organist, teacher and composer.

== Biography ==
Born 21 May 1626, in Königsberg, Bavaria, he was a student in Nuremberg and sang in the Frauenkirche choir. He later studied at the University of Altdorf and became the organist at St. Johannis church and a grammar school teacher in Schweinfurt. In 1650, Duke Ernst the Pious appointed him to his court at Gotha as cantor and music tutor to his family, and he eventually rose to the post of Kapellmeister. He became well-known through his work in Gotha, and it was there that he became acquainted with Johann Rudolph Ahle and members of the Bach family.

Duke Ernst's eldest daughter, the wife of Landgrave Louis VI of Hesse-Darmstadt, called Briegel to Darmstadt as Kapellmeister in 1671. He stayed in this post until his death, but in his later years he was assisted by Christoph Graupner and Ernst Christian Hesse.

== Music ==
Briegel was prolific in his sacred music output, completing 24 published collections between 1654 and 1709. He also wrote several "occasional" pieces and some secular works.

He attracted attention with the publication of his Evangelische Gespräch, a set of dialogue cantatas for the liturgical year in varied forms made up of solos, choruses and chorales. Another set of his works, the Evangelischer Blumengarten, is a group of motets and meditative choral songs. Among his solo songs are settings of odes by Andreas Gryphius, perhaps the only set of German Baroque songs that might be regarded as a cycle. At Darmstadt he produced several stage works, but none of that music has survived. His writing for voices is clear and eloquent, and his contrapuntal choruses are direct forerunners of those by Bach. His music enjoys an extraordinarily wide circulation throughout Germany and in Scandinavia, but is rarely heard outside of Europe.

== Works ==
Stage Works

- Von den freien Künsten, ballet, 2 July 1661, Gotha
- Musikalischer Freudenwunsch, ballet, 1 Oct 1665, Gotha
- Wedding ballet, 5 Dec 1666, Gotha
- Das verliebte Gespenst, opera, 1673, Darmstadt
- Triumphierendes Siegespiel der wahren Liebe (comédie, 1, J. Mylius), 8 June 1673, Darmstadt
- Das verbesserte Parisurteil, opera-ballet, 6 Jan 1674, Darmstadt
- Die beglückwünschte Majorennität des Fürsten, 22 June 1676, Darmstadt
- Quadriga activa, festival piece, 25 Jan 1677
- Bewillkommende Frühlingsfreude, ballet, 6 May 1683
- Das Band der beständigen Freundschaft, singspiel, 8 May 1683, Darmstadt
- Die siegende Weisheit, 8 Jan 1686
- Die wahren Seelenruhe oder gekrönte Eustathia, tragi-comedy, May 1686, Darmstadt
- Die triumphierende Tugend, opera-ballet, 29 July 1686, Darmstadt
- L'enchantement de Medée, ballet, 11 Nov 1688, Darmstadt
- Tugendgespräch, allegorical comedy, 19 Nov 1700
- Other ballets and incidental music for plays, 1683, 1687, 1700, 1705

Cantatas

- Evangelische Gespräch I–III, 5–10vv (Mühlhausen and Darmstadt, 1660–81); no.6 of vol.iii ed. F. Noack, Kirchenmusik der Darmstädter Musiker des Barock, iii (Berlin, 1955)
- Evangelischer Blumengarten I–IV, 4vv, bc (Gotha, 1660–69); 6 pieces ed. K. Ameln and H. Kümmerling, Biblische Motetten für den Kirchengesang (Kassel, 1970)
- J.S. Kriegmanns Evangelisches Hosianna, 1–5vv, insts, bc (Frankfurt, 1677); no. 5 ed. F. Noack, Vier kleine Kantaten (Wolfenbüttel, 1961), no.25 ed. E. Noack, Drei kleine Kantaten (Berlin, n.d.)
- Musicalische Trostquelle, 4vv, 2/4 vn, bc (Darmstadt, 1679)
- Musicalischer Lebensbrunn, 4vv, 4 insts, bc (Darmstadt, 1680)
- Christian Rehefelds evangelischer Palmenzweig, 1–5vv, 2–5 insts, bc (Frankfurt, 1684); nos.15, 44, 56 ed. F. Noack, Vier kleine Kantaten (Wolfenbüttel, 1961)
- J.G. Braunens, Cithara Davido-Evangelica, 4vv, 2 vn, bc (Giessen, 1685); no.62 ed. E. Noack, Drei kleine Kantaten (Berlin, n.d.)
- Concentus apostolico-musicus, 3, 4vv, 2 vn, bc (Giessen, 1697)
- Other unpublished works

Sacred vocal works

- Psalter Davids, Teil I, 4vv (Gotha, 1654)
- Geistlicher musikalischer Rosengarten, 1–5vv, insts (Gotha, 1658)
- Geistlicher Arien, Teil I, 1, 2vv, 2 and more vn, bc (Gotha, 1660)
- Geistlicher Arien, Teil II, 1, 2vv, 2 and more vn, bc (Mühlhausen, 1661)
- Die Verschmähete Eitelkeit [songs after J. Rist] (Gotha, 1669), lost
- Geistliche Oden Andreae Gryphii, 1v, 2 vn, bc (Gotha, 1670); facs. in Thomas
- Zwölf madrigalische Trostgesänge, 5, 6vv (Gotha, 1670–71)
- Geistliche Gespräche und Psalmen, 6vv, bc (Gotha, 1674)
- Das grosse Cantional oder Kirchen-Gesangbuch (Darmstadt, 1687) [ed., with H. Müller]
- Des Königs und Propheten Davids sieben Busspsalmen, 6vv/4vv, 2 vn, bc (Gotha, 1692)
- Letzter Schwanen-Gesang, 4, 5vv, bc ad lib (Giessen, 1709)
- Ten wedding and funeral songs, 2–6vv, insts (Gotha, 1653–70)
- One funeral song, 4vv (Darmstadt, 1678)
- Three funeral songs, 5vv (n.p., 1664–79)
- Several occasional songs in collections (see Noack, 1963)

Instrumental works

- 10 Paduanen, 10 Galliarden, 10 Balletten, 10 Couranten, a 3, 4 (Erfurt, 1652)
- Intraden, Sonaten, a 4, 5 (Leipzig and Erfurt, 1669)
- Allemanden und Couranten (Jena, 1664); facs. edn 1970
- Musikalisches Tafelkonfekt, 4vv, 2 vn, bc (Frankfurt, 1672)
- Musikalischer Erquickstunden, 4vv, str, bc (Darmstadt, 1679); lost
- MSS organ works, D-Dl; Acht Fugen durch die Kirchentöne, ed. W. Krumbach, Die Orgel, ii/19 (Köln, 1963)

== See also ==
- Hirschmann, Karl Friedrich, "Wolfgang Carl Briegel 1626-1712" (Ph.D. dissertation, Philipps-Universität zu Marburg, 1934)
- Noack, Elisabeth (1963). Wolfgang Carl Briegel: ein Barock-Komponist in seiner Zeit. Berlin: Merseburger.
- Tilley, Janette Marie, "Dialogue techniques in Lutheran sacred music of Seventeenth-Century Germany" (Ph.D. dissertation, University of Toronto [Canada], 2003)
- Walker, Diane Parr and Paul Walker (1992). German Sacred Polyphonic Vocal Music between Schütz and Bach: Sources and Critical Editions. Vol. 67, Detroit Studies in Music Bibliography. Warren, Michigan: Harmonie Park Press. ISBN 0-89990-054-2.
