= Knetzgau =

- Municipality
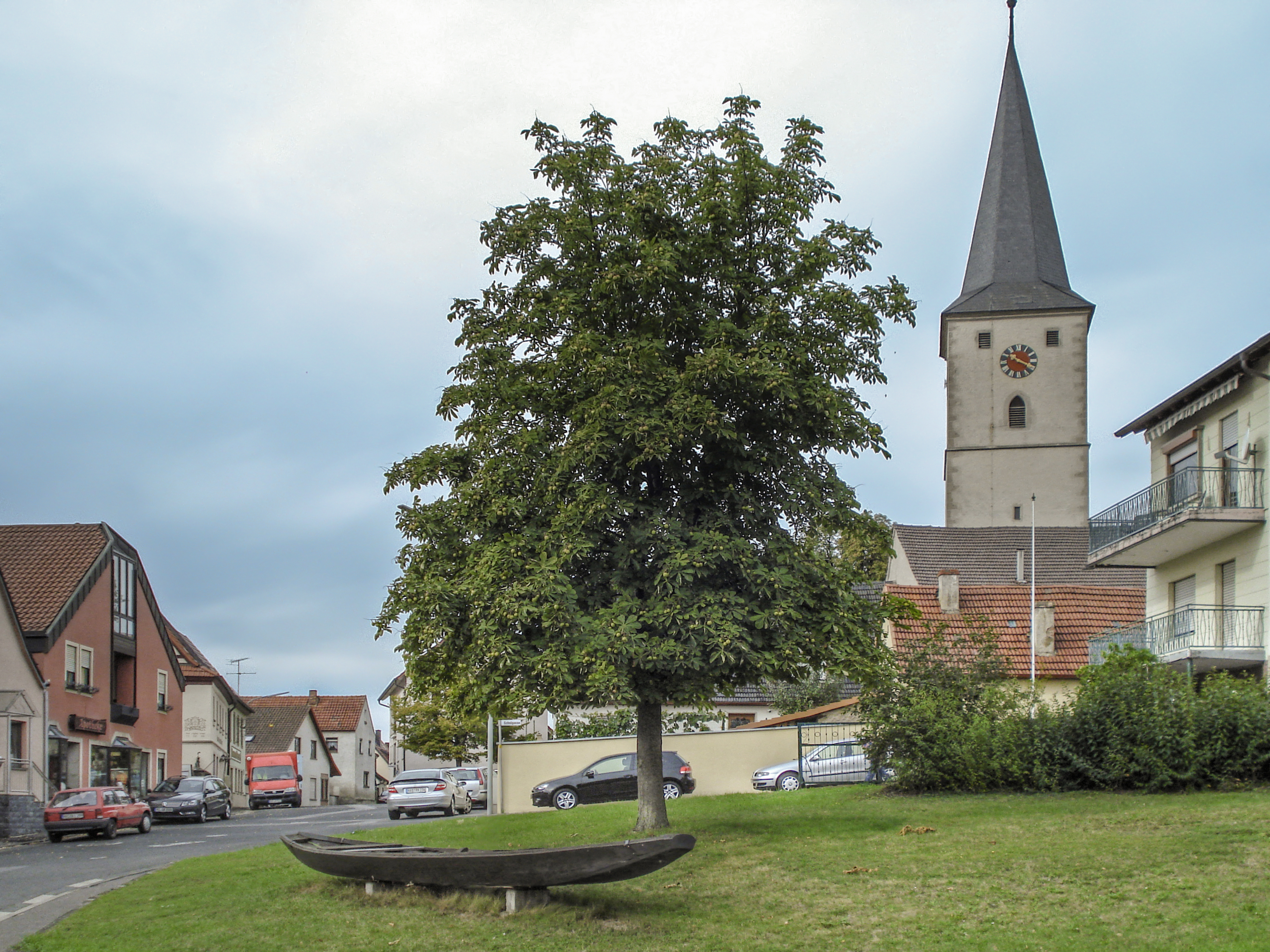
- Center of the village

- Coat of arms

- Location of Knetzgau within Haßberge district
- Interactive map of Knetzgau
- Location within Germany Location within Bavaria
- Coordinates: 49°59′N 10°33′E
- Country: Germany
- State: Bavaria
- Admin. region: Unterfranken
- District: Haßberge
- Subdivisions: 8 Ortsteile

Government
  - Mayor (2020–26): Stefan Paulus

Area
  - Total: 43.98 km^{2} (16.98 sq mi)
- Elevation: 238 m (781 ft)

Population (2025-12-31)
  - Total: 6,379
  - Density: 145.0/km^{2} (375.7/sq mi)
- Time zone: UTC+01:00 (CET)
  - Summer (DST): UTC+02:00 (CEST)
- Postal codes: 97478
- Dialling codes: 09527
- Vehicle registration: HAS
- Website: www.knetzgau.de

Knetzgau is a municipality in the district of Haßberge in Bavaria in Germany. It consists of eight villages: Oberschwappach, Unterschwappach, Westheim, Hainert, Eschenau, Neuhaus, Zell am Ebersberg, Wohnau and Zeil.
