= Wonfurt =

- Municipality
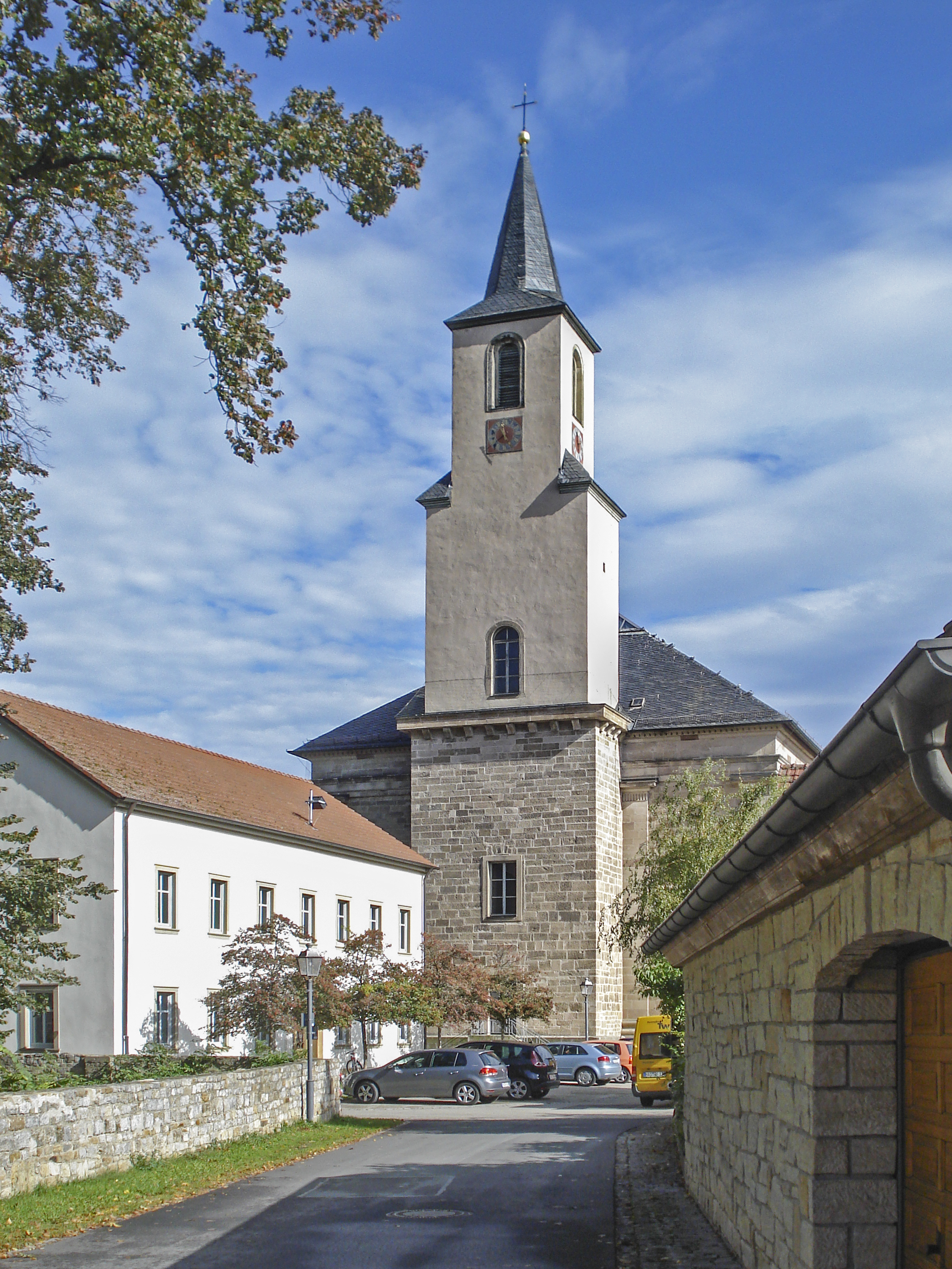
- Saint Andrew Church

- Coat of arms

- Location of Wonfurt within Haßberge district
- Interactive map of Wonfurt
- Location within Germany Location within Bavaria
- Coordinates: 50°01′N 10°28′E
- Country: Germany
- State: Bavaria
- Admin. region: Unterfranken
- District: Haßberge
- Municipal assoc.: Theres
- Subdivisions: 4 Ortsteile

Government
  - Mayor (2020–26): Holger Baunacher (CSU)

Area
  - Total: 17.36 km^{2} (6.70 sq mi)
- Elevation: 220 m (720 ft)

Population (2025-12-31)
  - Total: 1,903
  - Density: 109.6/km^{2} (283.9/sq mi)
- Time zone: UTC+01:00 (CET)
  - Summer (DST): UTC+02:00 (CEST)
- Postal codes: 97539
- Dialling codes: 09521 (Dampfach: 09528)
- Vehicle registration: HAS
- Website: www.wonfurt.de

Wonfurt is a municipality in the district of Haßberge in Bavaria in Germany.

== Mayors ==
Since 2013 Holger Baunacher (CSU/Dampfacher Liste/Steinsfelder Liste) is the mayor of Wonfurt. His predecessor was Dieter Zehendner (CSU).

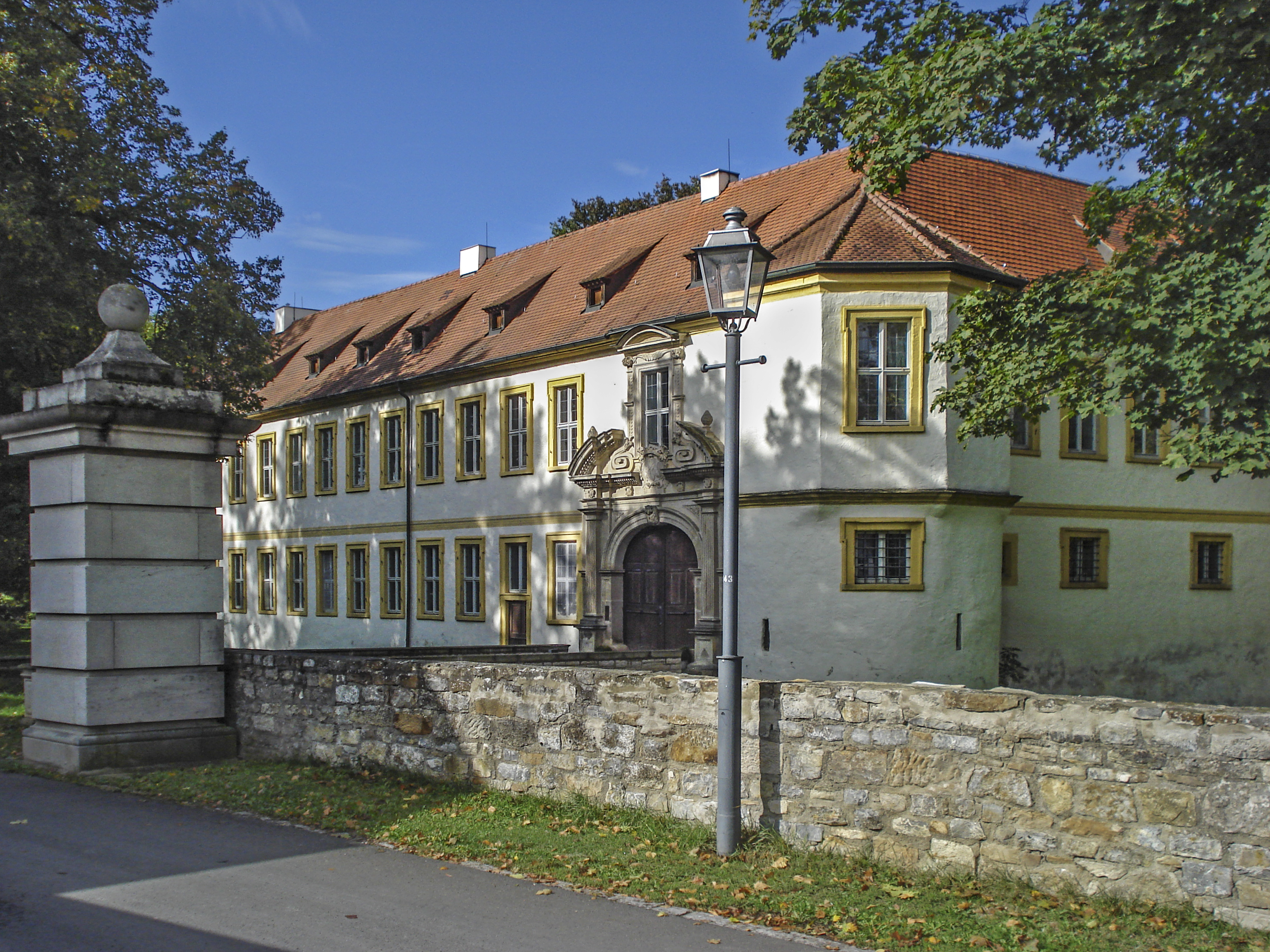
Wonfurt castle
