= Ermershausen =

- Municipality
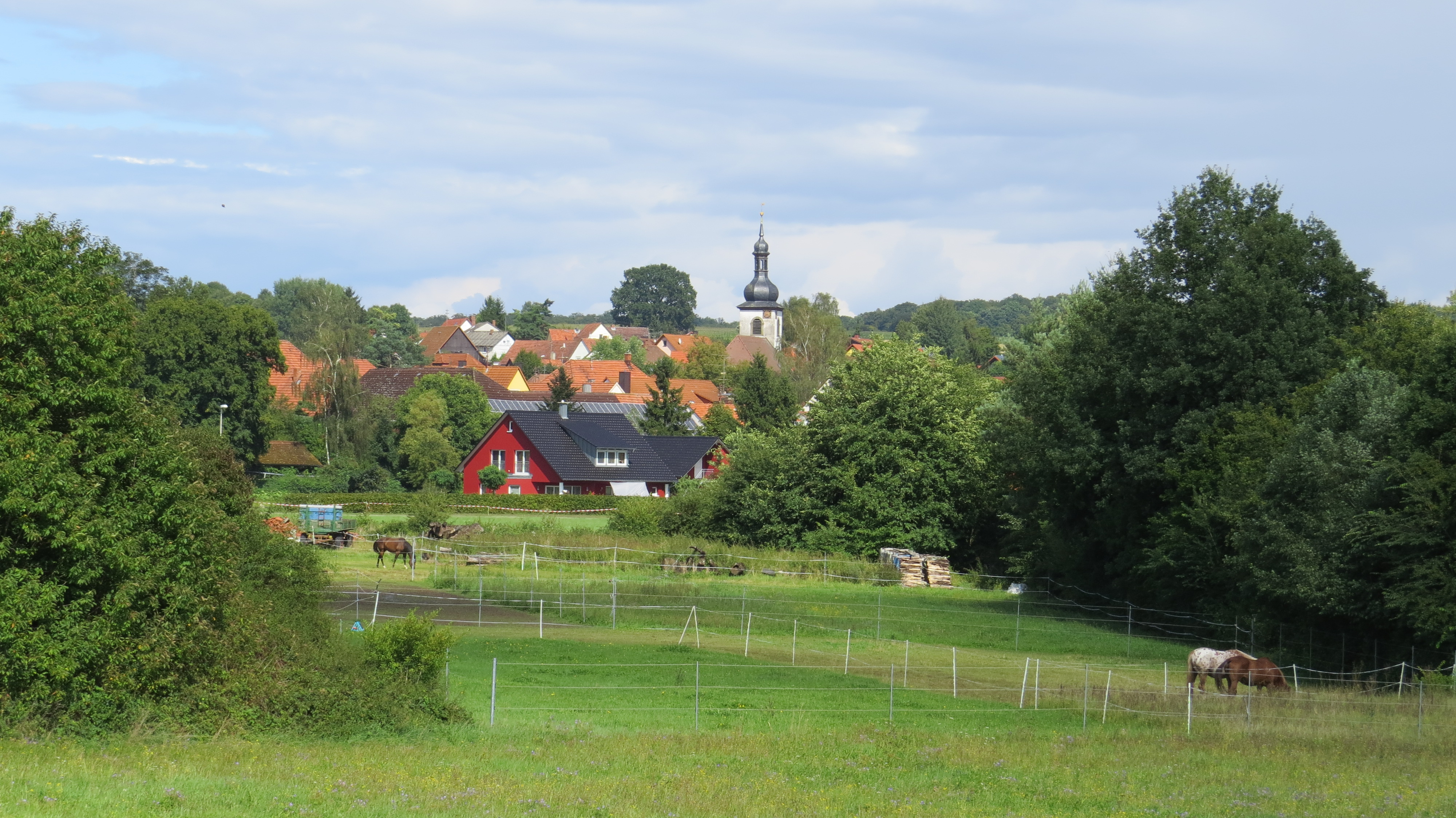
- Ermershausen seen from the southwest

- Coat of arms

- Location of Ermershausen within Haßberge district
- Interactive map of Ermershausen
- Location within Germany Location within Bavaria
- Coordinates: 50°13′N 10°37′E
- Country: Germany
- State: Bavaria
- Admin. region: Unterfranken
- District: Haßberge
- Municipal assoc.: Hofheim in Unterfranken

Government
  - Mayor (2020–26): Günter Pfeiffer (FW)

Area
  - Total: 9.21 km^{2} (3.56 sq mi)
- Elevation: 339 m (1,112 ft)

Population (2025-12-31)
  - Total: 522
  - Density: 56.7/km^{2} (147/sq mi)
- Time zone: UTC+01:00 (CET)
  - Summer (DST): UTC+02:00 (CEST)
- Postal codes: 96126
- Dialling codes: 09532
- Vehicle registration: HAS
- Website: vghofheim.de

Ermershausen is a municipality in the district of Haßberge in Bavaria in Germany.

== Notable people ==
- Narziß Ach (October 29, 1871 in Ermershausen, Bavaria – 25 July 1946 in Munich) was a German psychologist and university lecturer in Königsberg, Prussia and Göttingen, Germany.
- Louis Kissinger (1887–1982), father of Henry Kissinger
