= Theres =

- Municipality
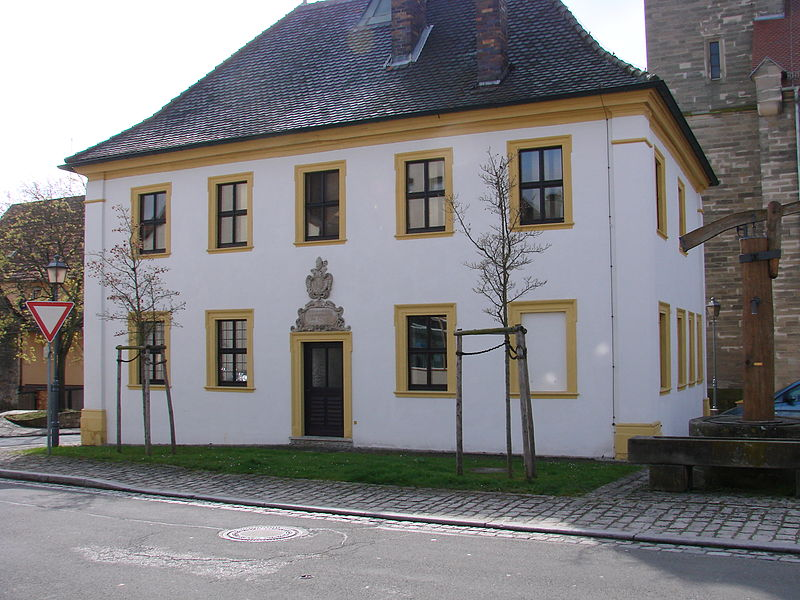
- Historic town hall in Obertheres

- Coat of arms

- Location of Theres within Haßberge district
- Interactive map of Theres
- Location within Germany Location within Bavaria
- Coordinates: 50°00′00″N 10°25′40″E
- Country: Germany
- State: Bavaria
- Admin. region: Unterfranken
- District: Haßberge
- Municipal assoc.: Theres
- Subdivisions: 4 Ortsteile

Government
  - Mayor (2023–29): Matthias Schneider (CSU)

Area
  - Total: 30.79 km^{2} (11.89 sq mi)
- Elevation: 250 m (820 ft)

Population (2025-12-31)
  - Total: 2,667
  - Density: 86.62/km^{2} (224.3/sq mi)
- Time zone: UTC+01:00 (CET)
  - Summer (DST): UTC+02:00 (CEST)
- Postal codes: 97531
- Dialling codes: 09521 u. 09528
- Vehicle registration: HAS
- Website: www.theres.de

Theres is a municipality on the river Main, in the district of Haßberge in Bavaria in Germany. It was once the site of Theres Abbey, but the church was demolished in 1809.
