= Theres (Verwaltungsgemeinschaft) =

- Verwaltungsgemeinschaft
- Location of Theres within Haßberge district
- Interactive map of Theres
- Location within Germany Location within Bavaria
- Coordinates: 50°01′N 10°26′E
- Country: Germany
- State: Bavaria
- Admin. region: Lower Franconia
- District: Haßberge
- Seat: Theres
- Subdivisions: 3 municipalities

Area
  - Total: 57.71 km^{2} (22.28 sq mi)

Population (2025-12-31)
  - Total: 5,885
  - Density: 102.0/km^{2} (264.1/sq mi)
- Time zone: UTC+01:00 (CET)
  - Summer (DST): UTC+02:00 (CEST)
- Website: www.vgtheres.de

Theres is a Verwaltungsgemeinschaft (municipal association) in the district of Haßberge in Bavaria, Germany. Its seat is in Theres.

It consists of the following municipalities:

1. Gädheim
2. Theres
3. Wonfurt
