= Narziß Ach =

German psychologist and university lecturer

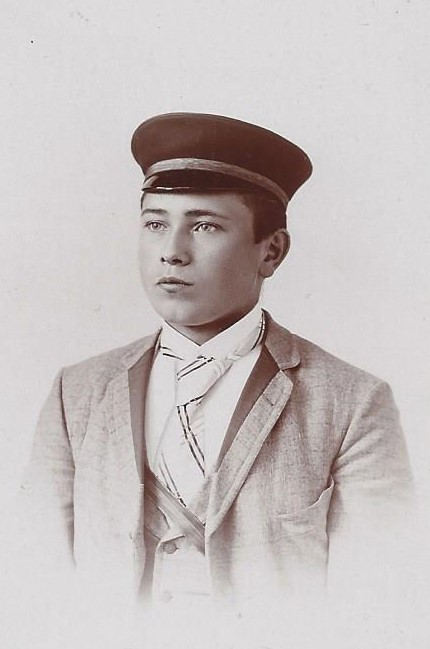
- Born: Narziß Kaspar Ach; 29 October 1871; Ermershausen, Kingdom of Bavaria, German Empire
- Died: 25 July 1946 (aged 74); Munich, Allied-occupied Germany
- Occupation(s): Psychologist, physician, inventor
- Spouse: Marie Mez (1911–1946, his death)
- Children: 6

Narziß Kaspar Ach (29 October 1871 – 25 July 1946) was a German psychologist and university lecturer in Königsberg, Prussia and Göttingen, Germany.

== Biography ==
From 1890–1895 and in 1898/99, he studied medicine and philosophy at the University of Würzburg and received his doctorate in 1895. In 1895/96 he worked in the psychological laboratory of Heidelberg University alongside Emil Kraepelin. In 1897, Ach went on a trip to North America for further examination of motion sickness. Following the journey, he worked at the pharmacological institute of the University of Strasbourg.

Ach was a member of the Würzburg School of "imageless thought", where he was a student of Oswald Külpe and received his PhD in 1899. Considered one of the most skillful experimental psychologists of his time, Ach was the first to conduct experiments in the area of volition. He developed the method of "systematic experimental introspection" and demonstrated experimentally the "determining tendency", which indicates that the instructions for the execution of a task sets up in a person a predisposition to act or react in a certain way, without the individual being necessarily aware of it.

Ach was also instrumental to the understanding of concept formation. Additionally, he was considered an accomplished apparatus builder and inventor. Later in his career, he would go on to apply his determining tendency theory in the study of applied psychological issues such as driver safety.

In 1933, Ach signed the Loyalty Oath of German Professors to Adolf Hitler and the National Socialist State. In 1938, Ach was elected as member of the German Academy of Sciences Leopoldina.

== Family ==
In 1911, Ach married his student Maria Elisabeth Mez (1891–1947), the daughter of botanist Carl Christian Mez and granddaughter of poet Wilhelm Jensen. They had six children together.
