= Hofheim in Unterfranken (Verwaltungsgemeinschaft) =

- Verwaltungsgemeinschaft
- Location of Hofheim in Unterfranken within Haßberge district
- Interactive map of Hofheim in Unterfranken
- Location within Germany Location within Bavaria
- Coordinates: 50°08′N 10°32′E
- Country: Germany
- State: Bavaria
- Admin. region: Lower Franconia
- District: Haßberge
- Seat: Hofheim in Unterfranken
- Subdivisions: 6 municipalities

Area
  - Total: 213.52 km^{2} (82.44 sq mi)

Population (2025-12-31)
  - Total: 11,208
  - Density: 52.492/km^{2} (135.95/sq mi)
- Time zone: UTC+01:00 (CET)
  - Summer (DST): UTC+02:00 (CEST)
- Website: www.vghofheim.de

Hofheim in Unterfranken is a Verwaltungsgemeinschaft (municipal association) in the district of Haßberge in Bavaria, Germany. Its seat is in Hofheim.

It consists of the following municipalities:

1. Aidhausen
2. Bundorf
3. Burgpreppach
4. Ermershausen
5. Hofheim
6. Riedbach
