= Breitbrunn =

- Municipality
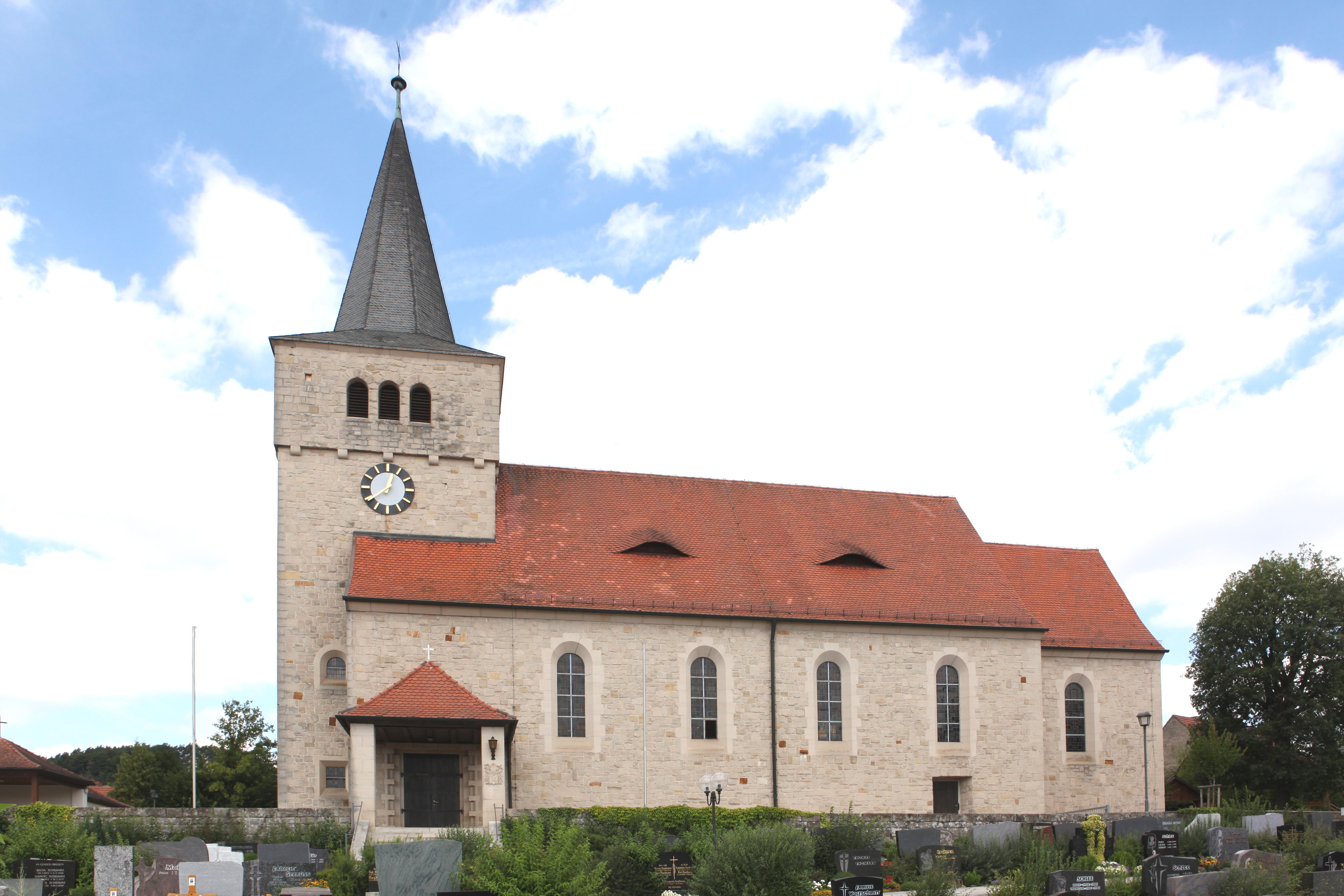
- Church of Saint Matthew

- Coat of arms

- Location of Breitbrunn within Haßberge district
- Interactive map of Breitbrunn
- Location within Germany Location within Bavaria
- Coordinates: 50°01′N 10°42′E
- Country: Germany
- State: Bavaria
- Admin. region: Unterfranken
- District: Haßberge
- Municipal assoc.: Ebelsbach
- Subdivisions: 6 Ortsteile

Government
  - Mayor (2020–26): Frank Ruth

Area
  - Total: 12.4 km^{2} (4.8 sq mi)
- Elevation: 300 m (980 ft)

Population (2025-12-31)
  - Total: 1,034
  - Density: 83.4/km^{2} (216/sq mi)
- Time zone: UTC+01:00 (CET)
  - Summer (DST): UTC+02:00 (CEST)
- Postal codes: 96151
- Dialling codes: 09536
- Vehicle registration: HAS
- Website: www.vg-ebelsbach.de

Breitbrunn (German pronunciation: [ˈbʁaɪtbʁʊn]) is a municipality in the district of Haßberge in Bavaria in Germany.
