= Rentweinsdorf =

- Municipality
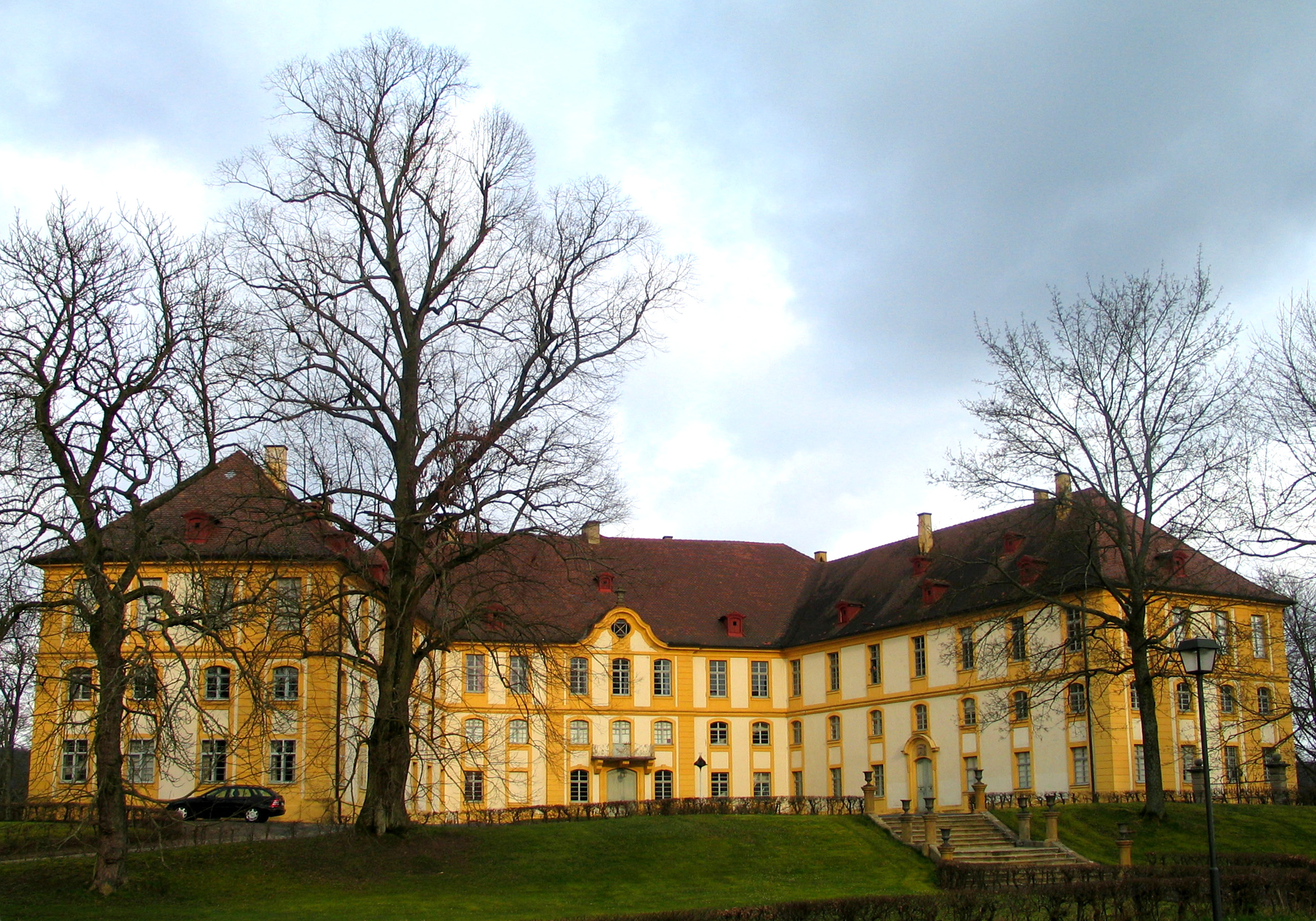
- Rentweinsdorf Castle

- Coat of arms

- Location of Rentweinsdorf within Haßberge district
- Interactive map of Rentweinsdorf
- Location within Germany Location within Bavaria
- Coordinates: 50°04′N 10°48′E
- Country: Germany
- State: Bavaria
- Admin. region: Unterfranken
- District: Haßberge
- Municipal assoc.: Ebern

Government
  - Mayor (2020–26): Steffen Kropp (SPD)

Area
  - Total: 24.62 km^{2} (9.51 sq mi)
- Elevation: 266 m (873 ft)

Population (2025-12-31)
  - Total: 1,513
  - Density: 61.45/km^{2} (159.2/sq mi)
- Time zone: UTC+01:00 (CET)
  - Summer (DST): UTC+02:00 (CEST)
- Postal codes: 96184
- Dialling codes: 09531 u. 09536
- Vehicle registration: HAS
- Website: www.rentweinsdorf.de

Rentweinsdorf is a municipality in the district of Haßberge in Bavaria in Germany.

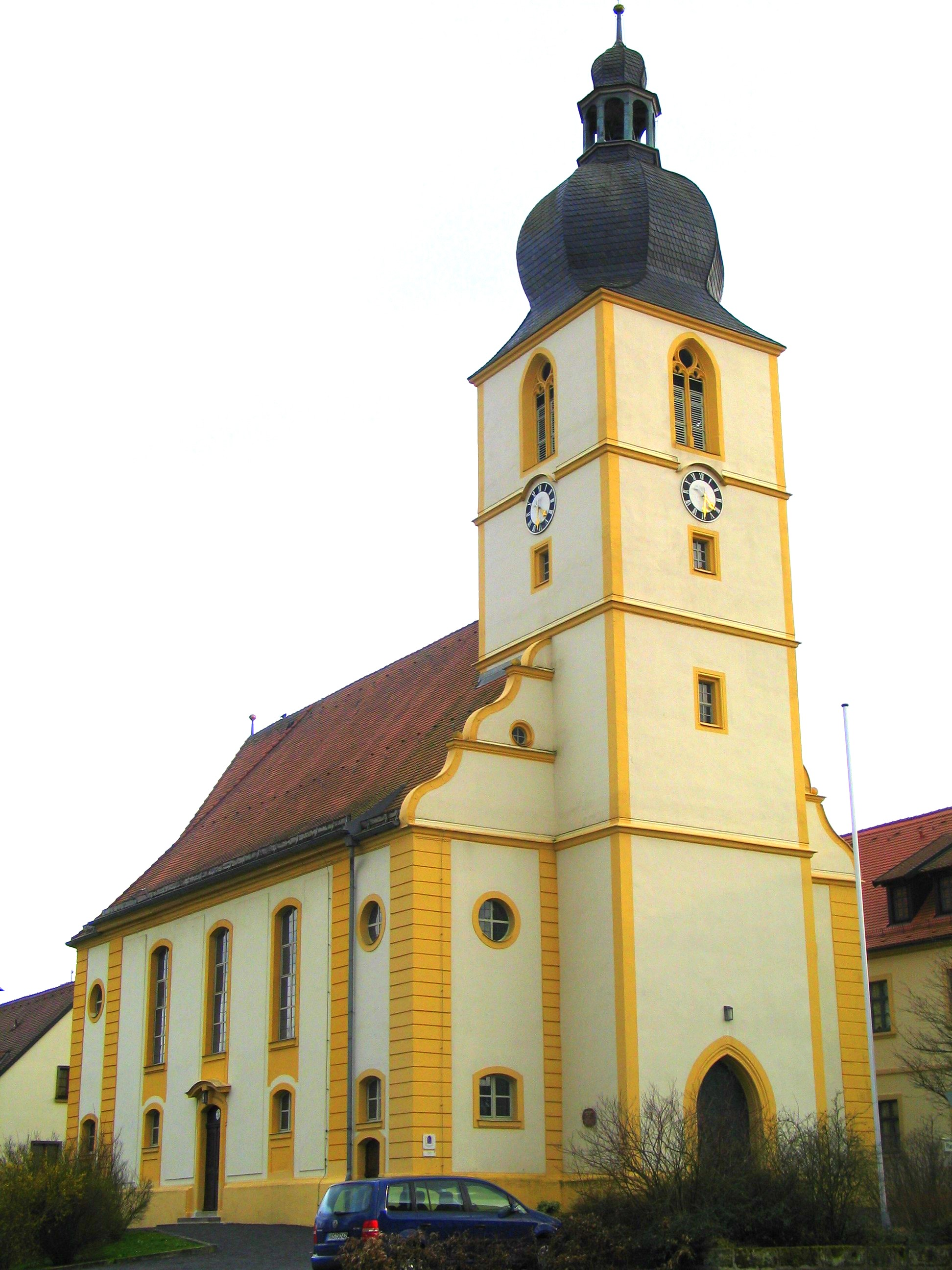
Church of the Holy Trinity
