= Gädheim =

- Municipality
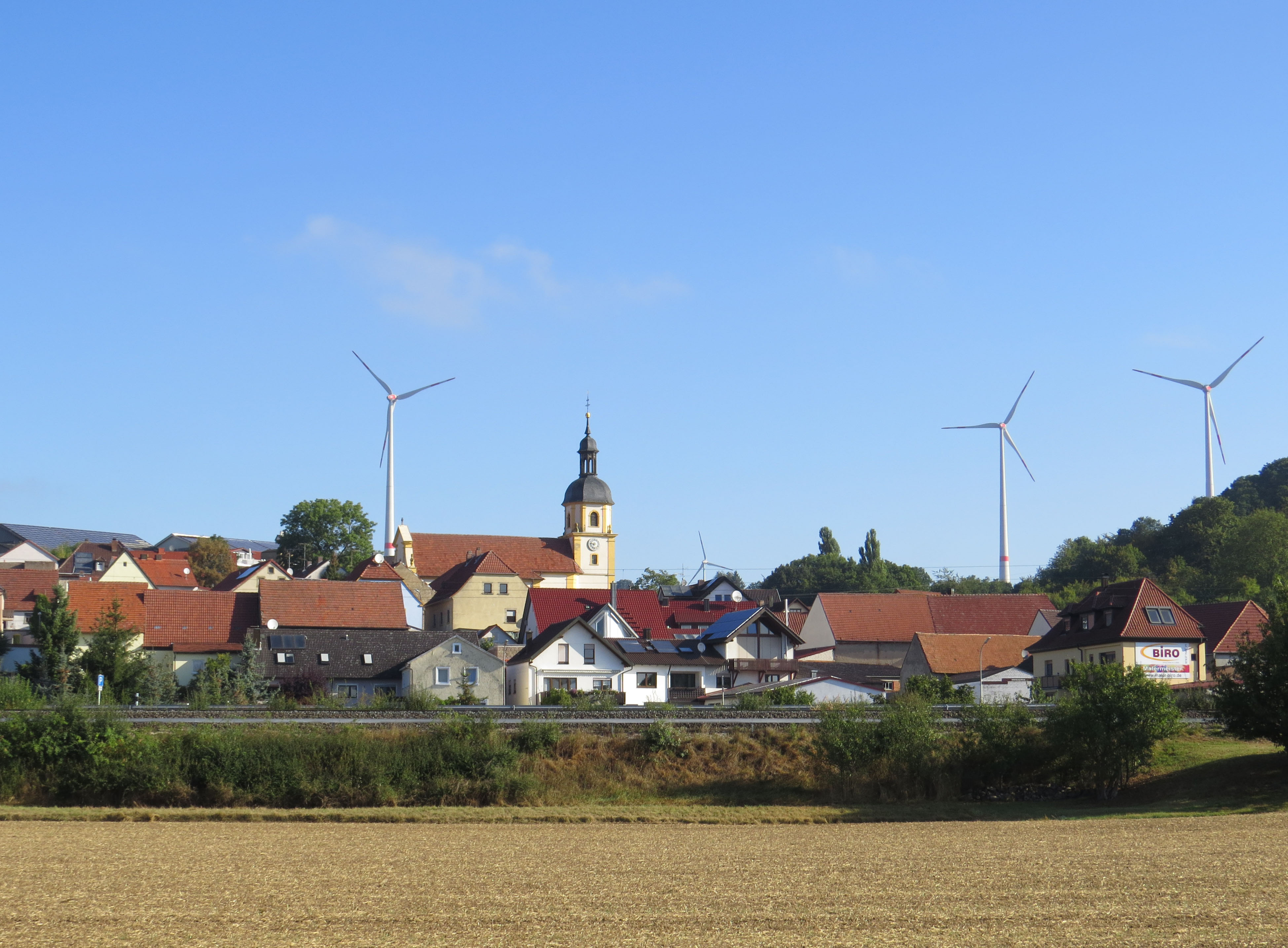
- Gädheim seen from the south

- Coat of arms

- Location of Gädheim within Haßberge district
- Interactive map of Gädheim
- Location within Germany Location within Bavaria
- Coordinates: 50°02′N 10°21′E
- Country: Germany
- State: Bavaria
- Admin. region: Unterfranken
- District: Haßberge
- Municipal assoc.: Theres
- Subdivisions: 3 Ortsteile

Government
  - Mayor (2020–26): Peter Kraus (CSU)

Area
  - Total: 9.58 km^{2} (3.70 sq mi)
- Elevation: 228 m (748 ft)

Population (2025-12-31)
  - Total: 1,315
  - Density: 137/km^{2} (356/sq mi)
- Time zone: UTC+01:00 (CET)
  - Summer (DST): UTC+02:00 (CEST)
- Postal codes: 97503
- Dialling codes: 09727
- Vehicle registration: HAS
- Website: www.gaedheim.de

Gädheim is a municipality in the district of Haßberge in Bavaria in Germany. It lies in the Main river valley.
