= Karl Eglseer =

German general (1890–1944)

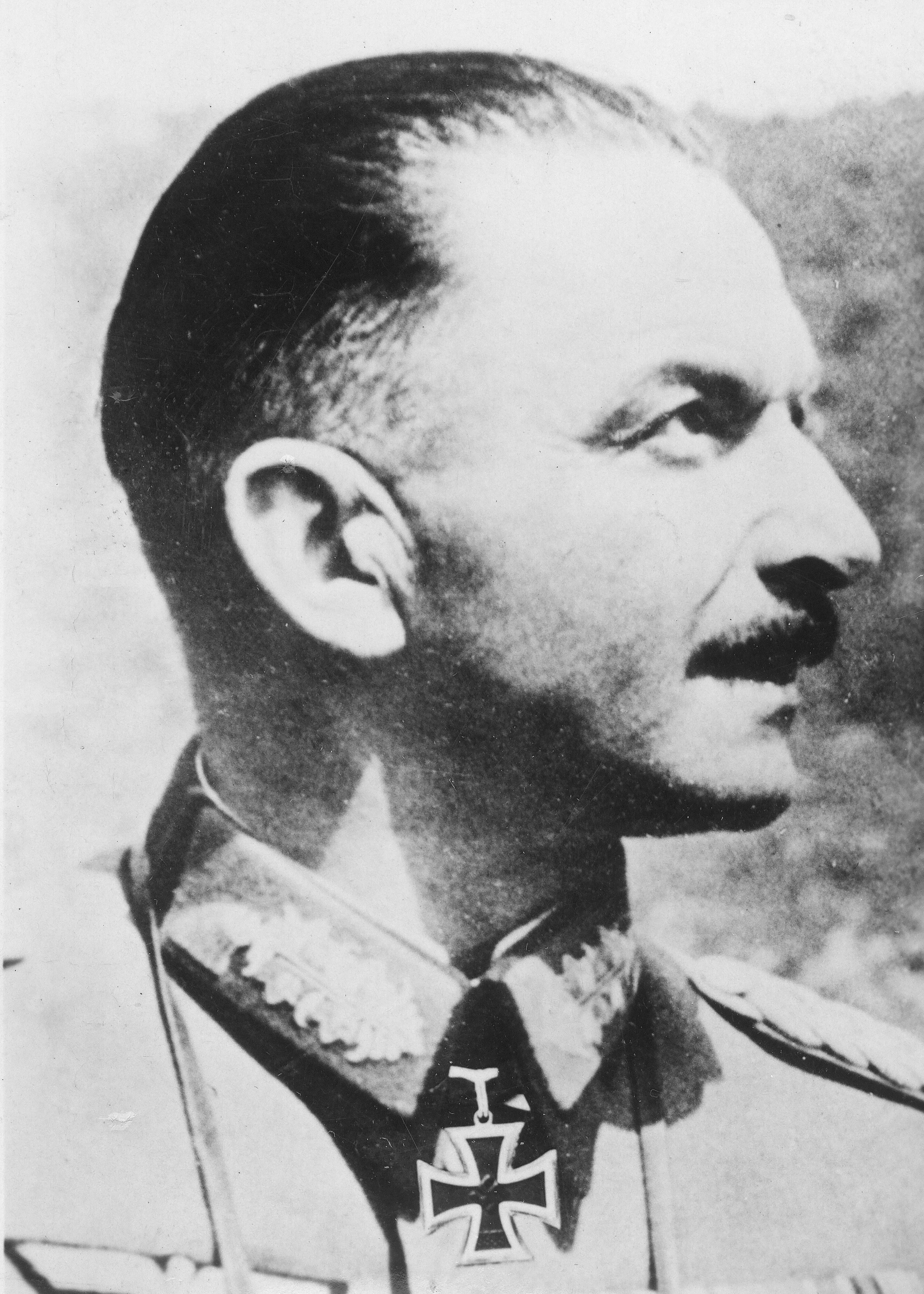
- Born: 5 July 1890; Bad Ischl, Upper Austria, Austria-Hungary
- Died: 23 June 1944 (aged 53) near Rettenegg, Nazi Germany now Austria
- Military career
- Allegiance: Austria-Hungary; First Austrian Republic; Nazi Germany
- Branch: German Army
- Service years: 1908–1938; 1938–1944
- Rank: Oberst; General der Gebirgstruppe
- Commands: 4th Mountain Division; 114th Jäger Division; XVIII Corps
- Conflicts: World War I; World War II; Annexation of Austria; Annexation of the Sudetenland; Battle of France; Invasion of Yugoslavia; Operation Barbarossa; Battle of Uman; Crimean Campaign (1941–1942); Battle of the Caucasus; Battle of Anzio
- Awards: Knight's Cross of the Iron Cross

Karl Eglseer (5 July 1890 – 23 June 1944) was a general in the Wehrmacht during World War II who commanded the XVIII Corps. He was a recipient of the Knight's Cross of the Iron Cross. Eglseer was killed in an air crash in Austria on 23 June 1944.

== Life and career ==
Karl Eglseer was born in Bad Ischl in Upper Austria on 5 July 1890. He entered the Austro-Hungarian Army in August 1908 as an ensign, serving in World War I. Remaining in the Austrian Bundesheer after 1918, he transferred to the Wehrmacht after the Anschluss with Germany in 1938.

In October 1940 he was promoted to command the 4th Mountain Division, serving in Army Group South on the Eastern Front. In October 1941 he was awarded the Knight's Cross of the Iron Cross for his leadership of the division. Eglseer then led the 714th Infantry Division (Note: Renamed the 114th Jäger Division in April 1943.) in Yugoslavia from February 1943 to December 1943, when he became commander of the XVIII Army Corps on the Northern sector of the Eastern Front.

On 23 June 1944 the aircraft carrying Eglseer, as well as Generals Dietl, von Wickede and Franz Rossi, crashed in the Styria region of Austria. There were no survivors. At the time of his death Eglseer held the rank of General of Mountain Troops.

== Awards ==
Austro-Hungarian Empire

- Karl Troop Cross
- Military Merit Cross, 3rd class with war decoration and swords

Nazi Germany

- Iron Cross (1939) 2nd and 1st Class
- Knight's Cross of the Iron Cross on 23 October 1941 as Generalmajor and commander of 4. Gebirgs-Division

Military offices
Preceded by none	Commander of 4. Gebirgs-Division; 23 October 1940 – 1 October 1941	Succeeded by Oberst Karl Wintergerst
Preceded by Oberst Karl Wintergerst	Commander of 4. Gebirgs-Division; November 1941 – 22 October 1942	Succeeded by Generalleutnant Hermann Kreß
Preceded by Generalleutnant Josef Reichert	Commander of 114th Jäger Division; 20 February 1943 – 1 December 1943	Succeeded by Generalleutnant Alexander Bourquin
Preceded by General der Gebirgstruppe Franz Böhme	Commander of XVIII Gerbirgskorps; 10 December 1943 – 23 June 1944	Succeeded by General der Infanterie Friedrich Hochbaum
