= Ebern (Verwaltungsgemeinschaft) =

- Verwaltungsgemeinschaft
- Location of Ebern within Haßberge district
- Interactive map of Ebern
- Location within Germany Location within Bavaria
- Coordinates: 50°05′N 10°48′E
- Country: Germany
- State: Bavaria
- Admin. region: Lower Franconia
- District: Haßberge
- Seat: Ebern
- Subdivisions: 3 municipalities

Area
  - Total: 148.06 km^{2} (57.17 sq mi)

Population (2025-12-31)
  - Total: 10,096
  - Density: 68.189/km^{2} (176.61/sq mi)
- Time zone: UTC+01:00 (CET)
  - Summer (DST): UTC+02:00 (CEST)
- Website: www.vg-ebern.de

Ebern is a Verwaltungsgemeinschaft (municipal association) in the district of Haßberge in Bavaria, Germany. Its seat is in Ebern.

It consists of the following municipalities:

1. Ebern
2. Pfarrweisach
3. Rentweinsdorf
