= Rauhenebrach =

- Municipality
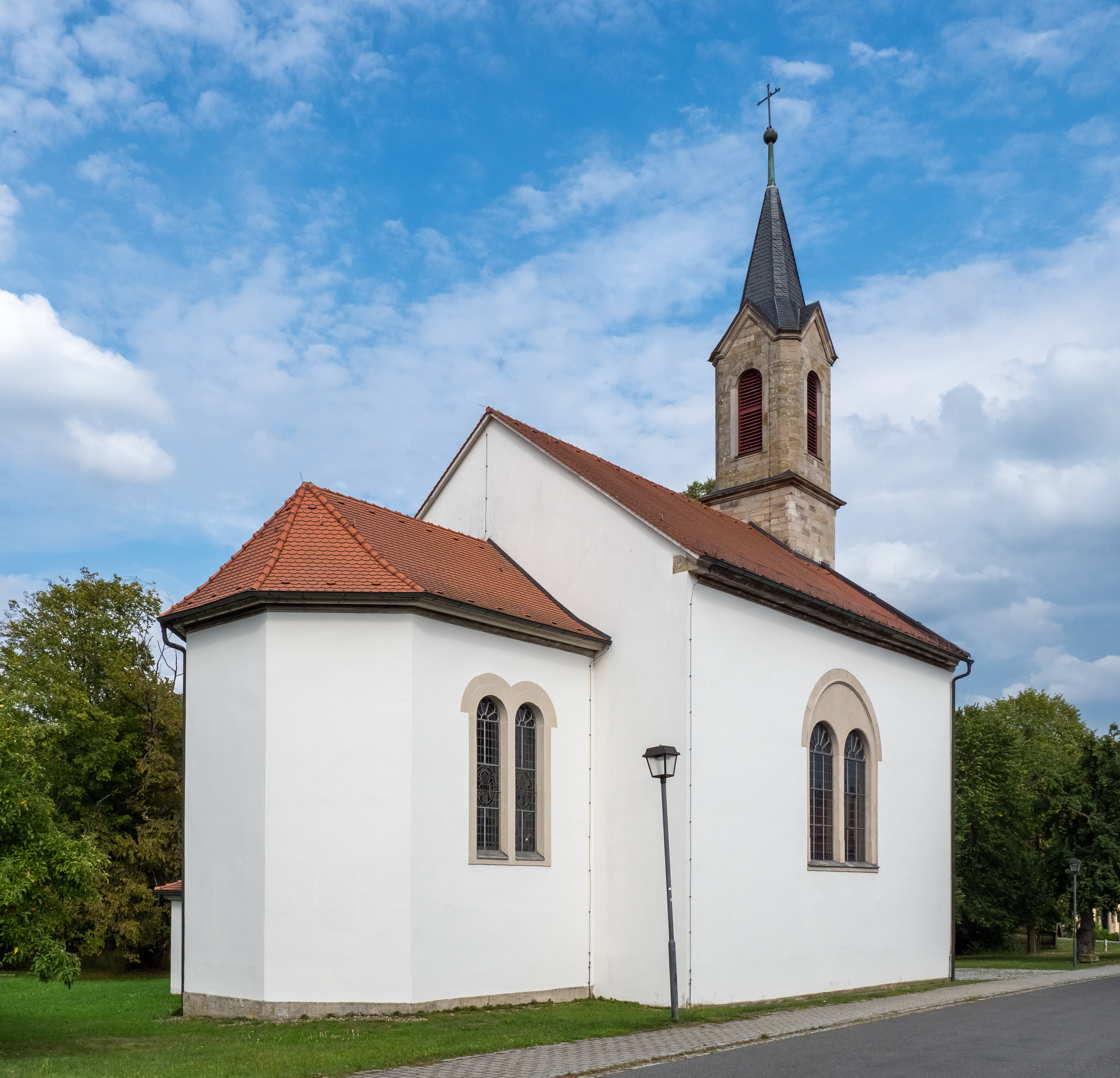
- Church of Saint Kilian in Fabrikschleichach

- Coat of arms

- Location of Rauhenebrach within Haßberge district
- Interactive map of Rauhenebrach
- Location within Germany Location within Bavaria
- Coordinates: 49°53′N 10°37′E
- Country: Germany
- State: Bavaria
- Admin. region: Unterfranken
- District: Haßberge

Government
  - Mayor (2020–26): Matthias Bäuerlein (FW)

Area
  - Total: 46.82 km^{2} (18.08 sq mi)
- Elevation: 320 m (1,050 ft)

Population (2025-12-31)
  - Total: 2,713
  - Density: 57.95/km^{2} (150.1/sq mi)
- Time zone: UTC+01:00 (CET)
  - Summer (DST): UTC+02:00 (CEST)
- Postal codes: 96181
- Dialling codes: 09554
- Vehicle registration: HAS
- Website: www.rauhenebrach.de

Rauhenebrach is a municipality in the district of Haßberge in Bavaria in Germany.
