= Hermann Kreß =

- Born: 23 July 1895
- Died: 11 August 1943 (aged 48); Novorossiysk, Soviet Union
- Military career
- Allegiance: Nazi Germany
- Branch: Army (Wehrmacht)
- Rank: Generalleutnant
- Commands: 4th Mountain Division
- Conflicts: Battles/Campaigns World War II: Battle of France; Invasion of Yugoslavia; Operation Barbarossa; Battle of Uman; Battle of Kiev (1941); Battle of Rostov (1941); Second Battle of Kharkov; Battle of the Caucasus †
- Awards: Knight's Cross of the Iron Cross

Hermann Kreß (23 July 1895 – 11 August 1943) was a German Generalleutnant during World War II who commanded the 4th Mountain Division.

In 1938, Kreß was appointed to command the 1st Mountain Division's 99th Regiment. He led the regiment until 1943, receiving the Knight's Cross of the Iron Cross in December 1941 while serving on the Eastern Front. After heavy losses to the 1st Mountain Division, he was given command of the 4th Mountain Division which he led as part of the XXXXIX Mountain Corps in the Battle of the Caucasus. Kreß was killed by a Soviet sniper on 11 August 1943, near Novorossiysk on the Kuban bridgehead.

== Awards ==
- Knight's Cross of the Iron Cross on 20 December 1941 as Oberst (colonel) and commander of Gebirgsjäger-Regiment 99

Military offices
Preceded by Generalleutnant Karl Eglseer	Commander of 4. Gebirgs-Division; 23 October 1942 – 11 August 1943	Succeeded by Generalleutnant Julius Braun
