= Königsberg in Bayern =

- Town
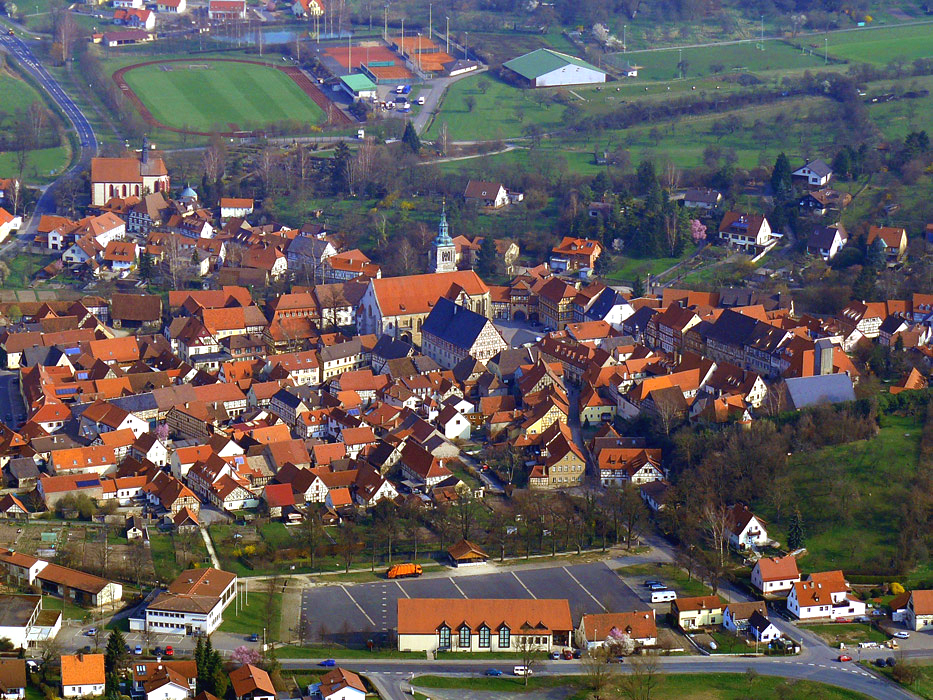
- Aerial view of the old town of Königsberg

- Coat of arms

- Location of Königsberg in Bayern within Haßberge district
- Interactive map of Königsberg in Bayern
- Location within Germany Location within Bavaria
- Coordinates: 50°4′40″N 10°34′00″E
- Country: Germany
- State: Bavaria
- Admin. region: Unterfranken
- District: Haßberge
- Subdivisions: 10 Ortsteile

Government
  - Mayor (2020–26): Claus Bittenbrünn (CSU)

Area
  - Total: 61.88 km^{2} (23.89 sq mi)
- Elevation: 280 m (920 ft)

Population (2025-12-31)
  - Total: 3,575
  - Density: 57.77/km^{2} (149.6/sq mi)
- Time zone: UTC+01:00 (CET)
  - Summer (DST): UTC+02:00 (CEST)
- Postal codes: 97486
- Dialling codes: 09525
- Vehicle registration: HAS
- Website: www.koenigsberg.de

Königsberg in Bayern (German pronunciation: [ˈkøːnɪçsbɛʁk ʔɪn ˈbaɪɐn, ˈkøːnɪk-], lit. 'Königsberg in Bavaria') is a town in the Haßberge district, in Lower Franconia, Bavaria, Germany. It is situated 7 km (5 miles) northeast of Haßfurt, and 31 km (20 miles) northwest of Bamberg.

It was an exclave of Saxe-Coburg and Gotha until 1918, after having been a part of Saxe-Hildburghausen.

== Notable people ==
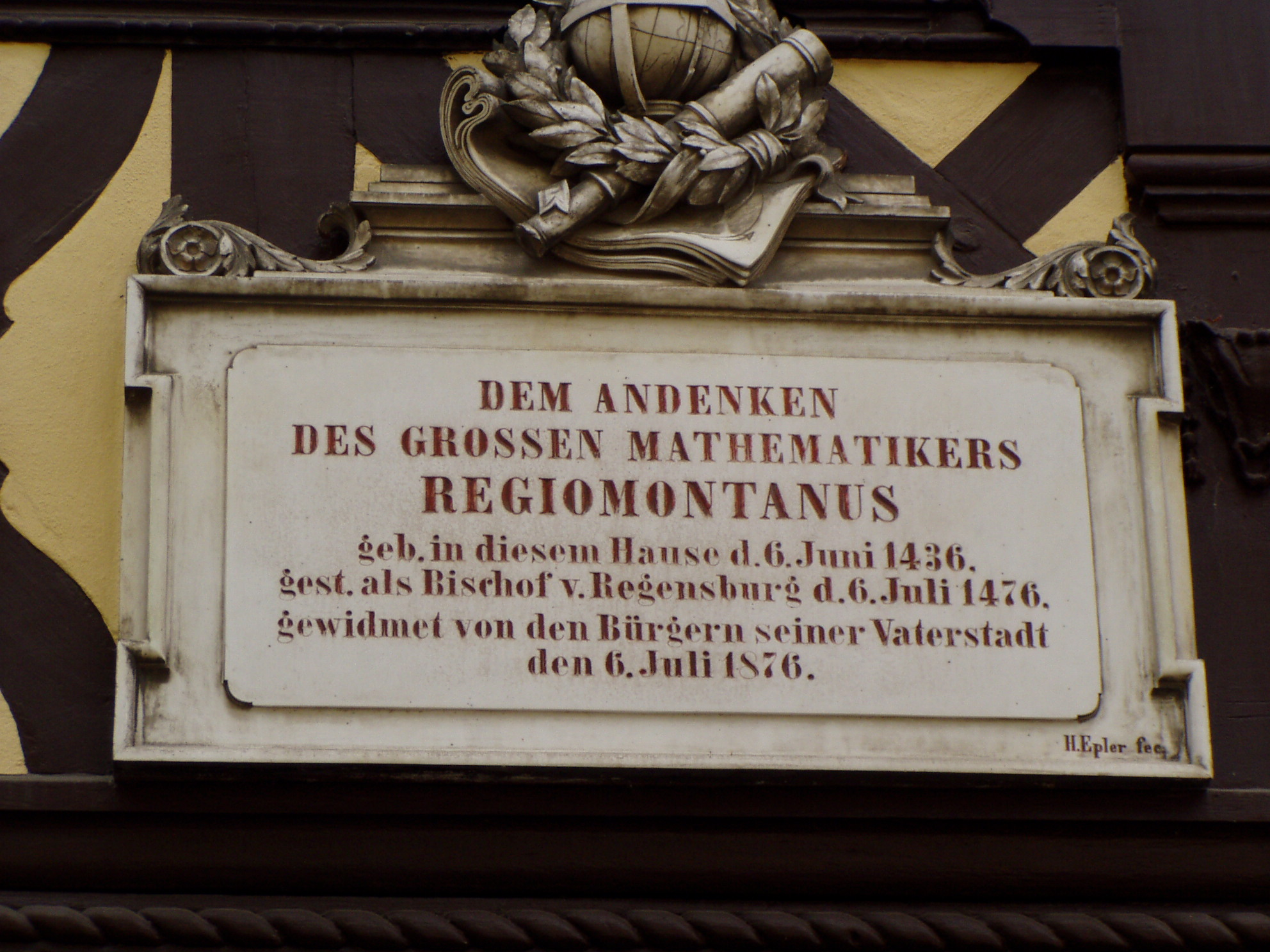
Plaque at the birthplace of Regiomontanus

- Johannes Müller alias Regiomontanus (1436–1476), a famous mathematician and astronomer.
- Johannes Marcellus (1510–1552), a philologist and poet, also called Regiomontanus
- Wolfgang Carl Briegel (1626–1712) a German organist, teacher, and composer.
- Friedrich Heinrich von Seckendorff (1673–1763), Imperial Fieldmarschall and diplomat.
