= 4th Mountain Division (Wehrmacht) =

- German: 4. Gebirgs-Division
- Unit insignia
- Active: October 1940 – May 1945
- Country: Nazi Germany
- Branch: German Army
- Type: Gebirgsjäger
- Role: Mountain warfare
- Size: Division
- Engagements: Balkans campaign Eastern Front

Commanders
- Notable commanders: Karl Eglseer

The 4th Mountain Division (German: 4. Gebirgs Division) was a mountain infantry division of the Heer, the army of the Wehrmacht of Nazi Germany during World War II. The division was active between October 1940 and May 1940 and participated in the Balkans campaign as well as on the Eastern Front.

== History ==
The 4th Mountain Division was established in October 1940. It took part in the 1941 Balkans Campaign and then joined Army Group South in Operation Barbarossa after it was already underway. In 1942 it participated in the failed attempt to seize the Caucasus in Operation Edelweiss under Army Group A. Following the operation's failure, the division was pushed back into the Kuban bridgehead, then the Crimean Peninsula, western Ukraine, Hungary, and Slovakia. The division surrendered to the Soviet forces near Czech city of Olomouc when the war ended in May 1945.

On 1 January 1945, the 4th Mountain Division (then under Army Group Heinrici of Army Group A) had a strength of 12,979 men.

During the war, 33 members of the division received the Iron Cross Knight's Cross and two received the Knight's Cross with Oak Leaves.

== Commanders ==
- Generalleutnant Karl Eglseer, 23 October 1940 – 1 October 1941
- Oberst Karl Wintergerst, 1 October 1941 – November 1941
- Generalleutnant Karl Eglseer, November 1941 – 22 October 1942
- Generalleutnant Hermann Kreß, 23 October 1942 – 11 August 1943
  (Kreß was killed by a Soviet sniper on 11 August 1943, near Novorossiysk on the Kuban bridgehead)
- Generalleutnant Julius Braun, 13 August 1943 – 6 June 1944
- Oberst Karl Jank, 6 June 1944 – 1 July 1944
- Generalleutnant Friedrich Breith, 1 July 1944 – 23 February 1945
- Oberst Robert Bader, 23 February 1945 – 6 April 1945
- Generalleutnant Friedrich Breith, 6 April 1945 – 8 May 1945

== Order of battle ==
- Gebirgsjäger-Regiment 13
- Gebirgsjäger-Regiment 91
- Gebirgs-Artillerie-Regiment 94
- Panzerjäger-Kompanie 94
- Gebirgs-Pionier-Bataillon 94
- Aufklärungsabteilung 94
- Nachrichten-Abteilung 94
- Gebirgsjäger-Bataillon 94
- Divisions-Einheiten 94
