= Untermerzbach =

- Municipality
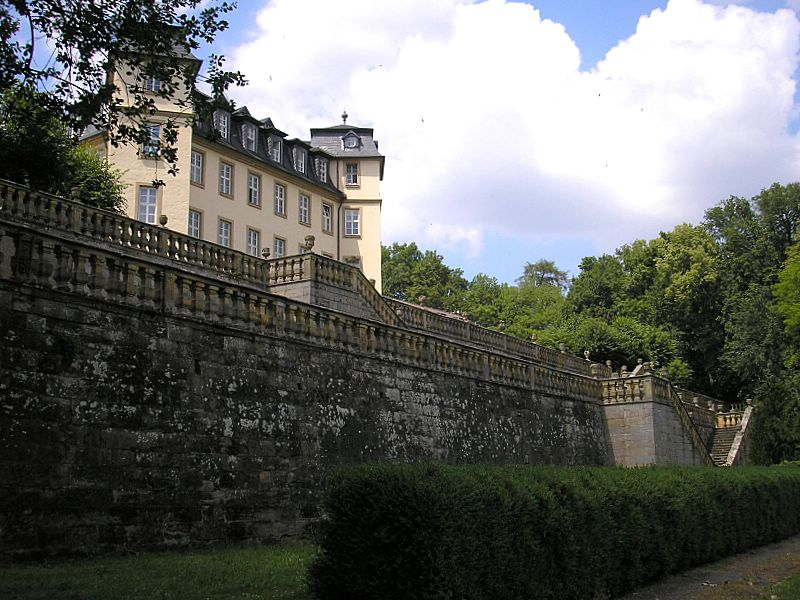
- Untermerzbach Castle

- Coat of arms

- Location of Untermerzbach within Haßberge district
- Interactive map of Untermerzbach
- Location within Germany Location within Bavaria
- Coordinates: 50°07′46″N 10°51′36″E
- Country: Germany
- State: Bavaria
- Admin. region: Unterfranken
- District: Haßberge

Government
  - Mayor (2020–26): Helmut Dietz (SPD)

Area
  - Total: 27.75 km^{2} (10.71 sq mi)
- Elevation: 264 m (866 ft)

Population (2025-12-31)
  - Total: 1,591
  - Density: 57.33/km^{2} (148.5/sq mi)
- Time zone: UTC+01:00 (CET)
  - Summer (DST): UTC+02:00 (CEST)
- Postal codes: 96190
- Dialling codes: 09533
- Vehicle registration: HAS
- Website: www.untermerzbach.de

Untermerzbach is a municipality in the district of Haßberge in Bavaria in Germany.
