= Haßfurt =

- Town
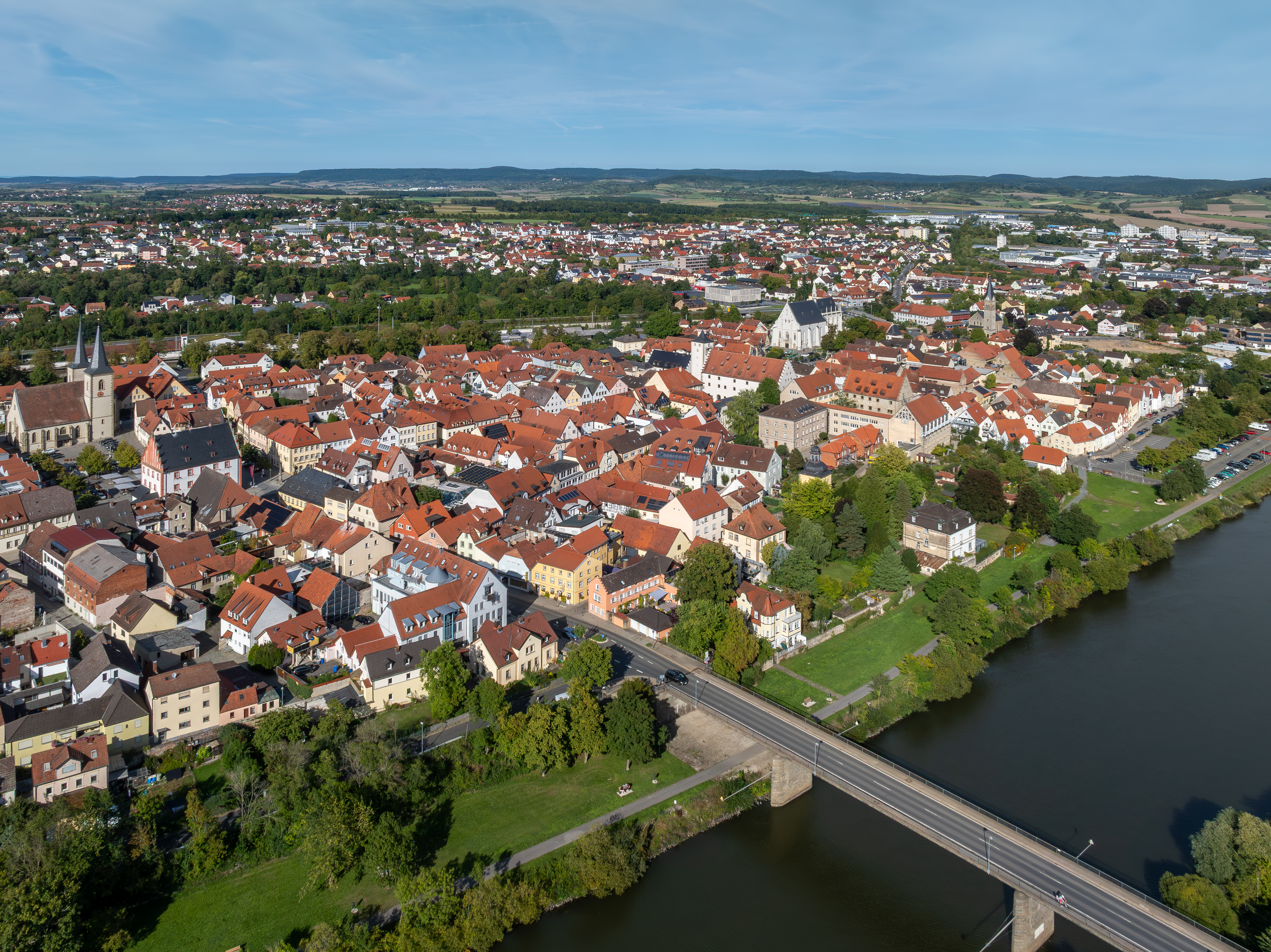
- Aerial view of Haßfurt

- Coat of arms

- Location of Haßfurt within Haßberge district
- Interactive map of Haßfurt
- Location within Germany Location within Bavaria
- Coordinates: 50°01′N 10°30′E
- Country: Germany
- State: Bavaria
- Admin. region: Unterfranken
- District: Haßberge
- Subdivisions: 9 Stadtteile

Government
  - Mayor (2020–26): Günther Werner

Area
  - Total: 52.77 km^{2} (20.37 sq mi)
- Elevation: 220 m (720 ft)

Population (2025-12-31)
  - Total: 13,780
  - Density: 261.1/km^{2} (676.3/sq mi)
- Time zone: UTC+01:00 (CET)
  - Summer (DST): UTC+02:00 (CEST)
- Postal codes: 97437
- Dialling codes: 09521
- Vehicle registration: HAS
- Website: www.hassfurt.de

Haßfurt (German pronunciation: [ˈhasˌfʊʁt]; English: Hassfurt) is a town in Bavaria, Germany, capital of the Haßberge district. It is situated on the river Main, 20 km east of Schweinfurt and 30 km northwest of Bamberg. In 1852, Ludwig's Western Railway reached the town and between 1892 and 1995, which also had a branch line to Hofheim. The 1867 Hassfurt Bridge, thought to be the first Cantilever bridge built, was also there.

== Notable residents ==
- Hermann Kreß (1895-1943), German general, commander of the 4th Mountain Division, killed in the Soviet Union
- Fritz Sauckel (1894-1946), Nazi politician, executed for war crimes
- Albert Neuberger FRS (1908-1996), biochemist and professor
- Klara Bühl (born 2000), footballer for the Germany national team

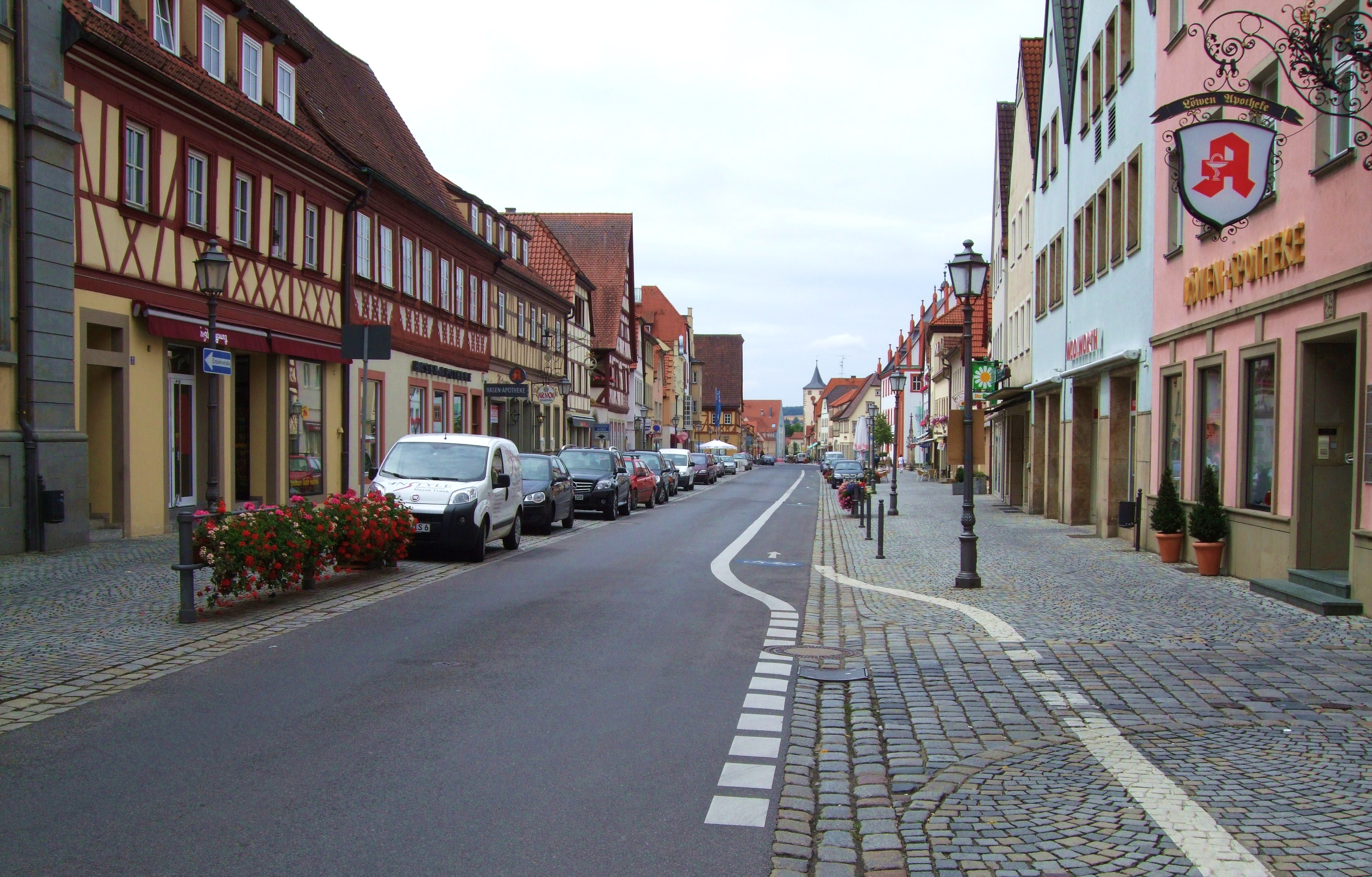
The main street in Hassfurt
