= Burgpreppach =

- Municipality
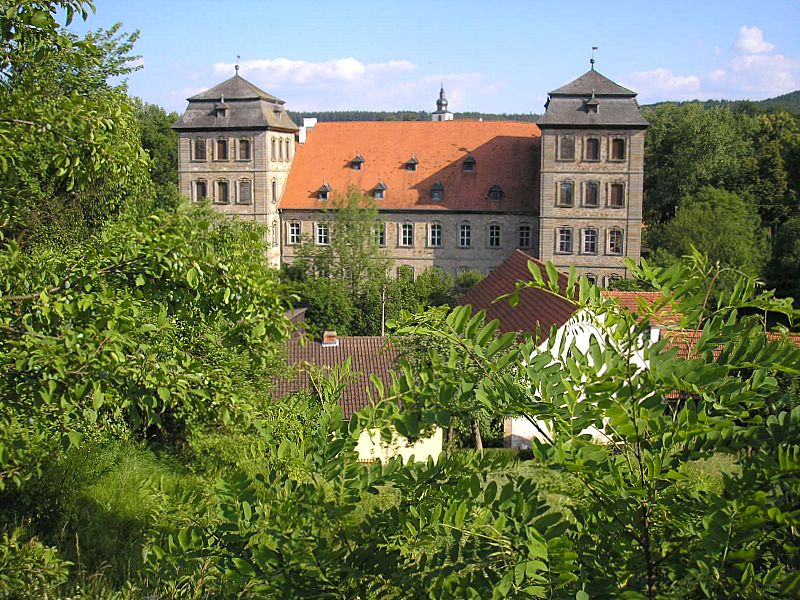
- Burgpreppach Castle

- Coat of arms

- Location of Burgpreppach within Haßberge district
- Interactive map of Burgpreppach
- Location within Germany Location within Bavaria
- Coordinates: 50°08.5′N 10°39′E
- Country: Germany
- State: Bavaria
- Admin. region: Unterfranken
- District: Haßberge
- Municipal assoc.: Hofheim in Unterfranken
- Subdivisions: 15 Ortsteile

Government
  - Mayor (2024–30): Marion Fleischmann-Hilton

Area
  - Total: 38.75 km^{2} (14.96 sq mi)
- Elevation: 290 m (950 ft)

Population (2025-12-31)
  - Total: 1,333
  - Density: 34.40/km^{2} (89.10/sq mi)
- Time zone: UTC+01:00 (CET)
  - Summer (DST): UTC+02:00 (CEST)
- Postal codes: 97496
- Dialling codes: 09534
- Vehicle registration: HAS
- Website: www.burgpreppach.de

Burgpreppach is a municipality in the district of Haßberge in Bavaria in Germany.
