= Aidhausen =

- Municipality
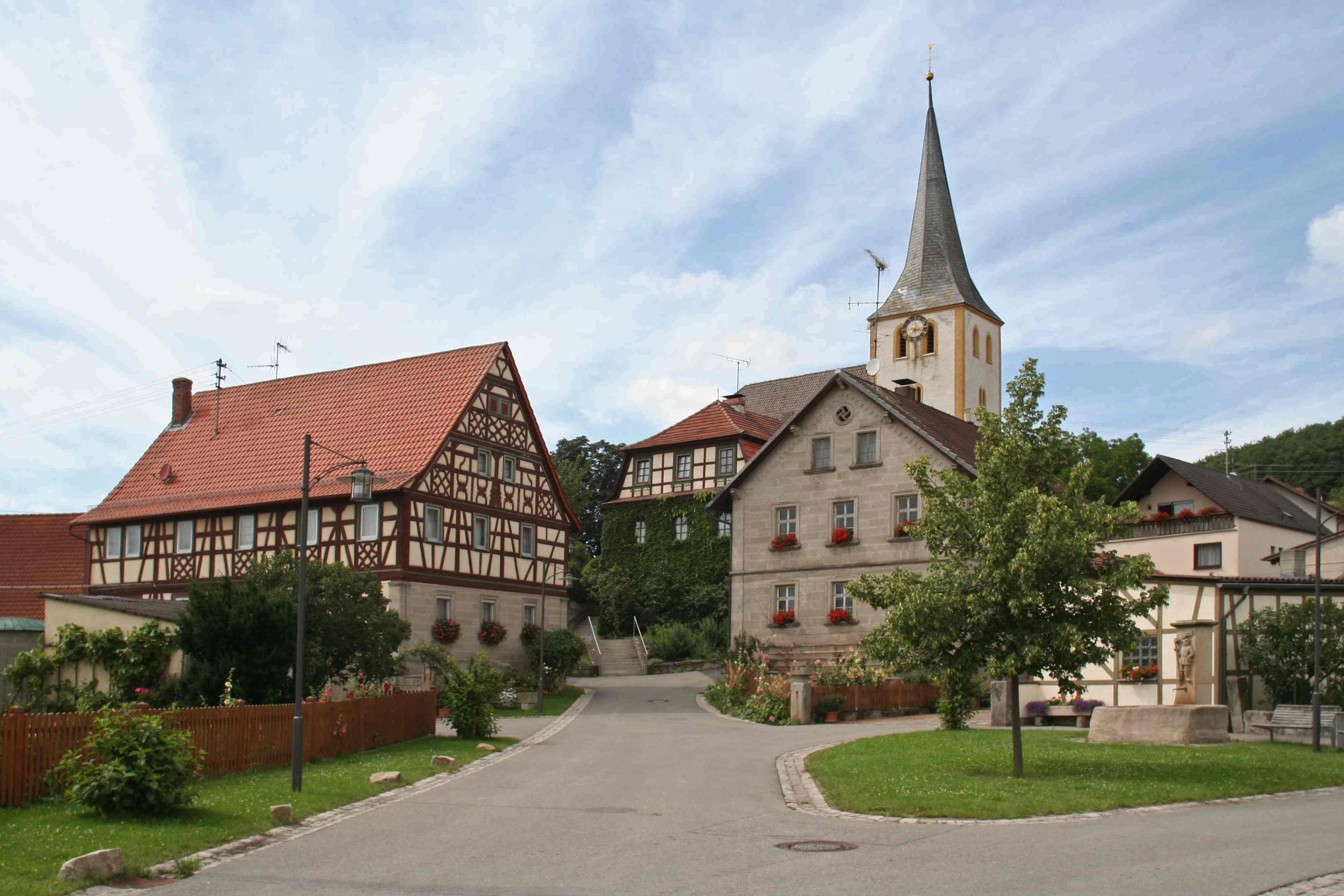
- Municipal part of Nassach

- Coat of arms

- Location of Aidhausen within Haßberge district
- Interactive map of Aidhausen
- Location within Germany Location within Bavaria
- Coordinates: 50°9′18″N 10°26′09″E
- Country: Germany
- State: Bavaria
- Admin. region: Unterfranken
- District: Haßberge
- Municipal assoc.: Hofheim in Unterfranken

Government
  - Mayor (2020–26): Dieter Möhring (FW)

Area
  - Total: 37.30 km^{2} (14.40 sq mi)
- Elevation: 292 m (958 ft)

Population (2025-12-31)
  - Total: 1,625
  - Density: 43.57/km^{2} (112.8/sq mi)
- Time zone: UTC+01:00 (CET)
  - Summer (DST): UTC+02:00 (CEST)
- Postal codes: 97491
- Dialling codes: 09526
- Vehicle registration: HAS
- Website: www.gemeinde-aidhausen.de

Aidhausen is a municipality in the district of Haßberge in Bavaria in Germany, it is a member of the Verwaltungsgemeinschaft Hofheim in Unterfranken.

== Geography ==
Aidhausen is located in the Main-Rhön region. It is divided into the following districts: Aidhausen, Friesenhausen, Happertshausen, Kerbfeld and Nassach.

== History ==
Aidhausen was an office of the Prince-Bishopric of Würzburg. After the secularization it was given to Ferdinand III, Grand Duke of Tuscany for building up the Großherzogtum Würzburg. In the 1814 Treaty of Paris, it was given back to Bavaria.

== Politics ==
The municipal council in Aidhausen has 12 members, all of which were candidates for the combined list CSU/FW at the March 2020 local election.

== Mayor ==
The mayor is Dieter Möhring (Freie Wähler), in office since 2002.
