= Haßberge (district) =

Coordinates: 50°05′N 10°40′E

- District
- Flag Coat of arms
- Country: Germany
- State: Bavaria
- Adm. region: Lower Franconia
- Capital: Haßfurt

Government
  - District admin.: Wilhelm Schneider (CSU)

Area
  - Total: 956 km^{2} (369 sq mi)

Population (31 December 2025)
  - Total: 83,390
  - Density: 87.2/km^{2} (226/sq mi)
- Time zone: UTC+01:00 (CET)
  - Summer (DST): UTC+02:00 (CEST)
- Vehicle registration: EBN, GEO, HAS, HOH
- Website: landkreis-hassberge.de

Haßberge (German pronunciation: [ˈhasbɛʁɡə]) is a Landkreis (district) in Bavaria, Germany. It is bounded by (from the northeast and clockwise) the districts of Coburg, Bamberg, Schweinfurt and Rhön-Grabfeld, and by the state of Thuringia (district of Hildburghausen).

== History ==
The district was established in 1972 by merging the districts of Haßfurt, Ebern and Hofheim.

== Geography ==
The district is named after the Haßberge hill chain, which is located south of the Thuringian border. It is an eastern extension of the Rhön mountains and densely forested. South of the hills the Main river crosses the district from east to west. South of the river there is the Steigerwald forest, whose northern parts belong to the district. Both the Haßberge hills and the Steigerwald are nature parks.

== Coat of arms ==
The three jags are from the arms of Würzburg; the lion symbolises the city of Bamberg. These two bishoprics owned most of the region in medieval times. Below there is a motive from the Saxon coat of arms, since the city of Königsberg once belonged to Saxe-Coburg and did not become a part of Bavaria before 1920.

== Towns and municipalities ==
Clickable map of towns and municipalities in the district

Towns
1. Eltmann
2. Haßfurt
3. Königsberg in Bayern
4. Zeil am Main
Märkte
1. Maroldsweisach
Municipalities
1. Knetzgau
2. Oberaurach
3. Rauhenebrach
4. Sand am Main
5. Untermerzbach

Verwaltungsgemeinschaften
1. Ebelsbach; 1. Breitbrunn; 2. Ebelsbach^{1}; 3. Kirchlauter; 4. Stettfeld	2. Ebern; 1. Ebern^{1,2}; 2. Pfarrweisach; 3. Rentweinsdorf^{3}	3. Hofheim in Unterfranken; 1. Aidhausen; 2. Bundorf; 3. Burgpreppach^{3}; 4. Ermershausen; 5. Hofheim^{1,2}; 6. Riedbach	4. Theres; 1. Gädheim; 2. Theres^{1}; 3. Wonfurt
^{1}seat of the Verwaltungsgemeinschaft; ^{2}town; ^{3}Markt
