= Stettfeld =

- Municipality
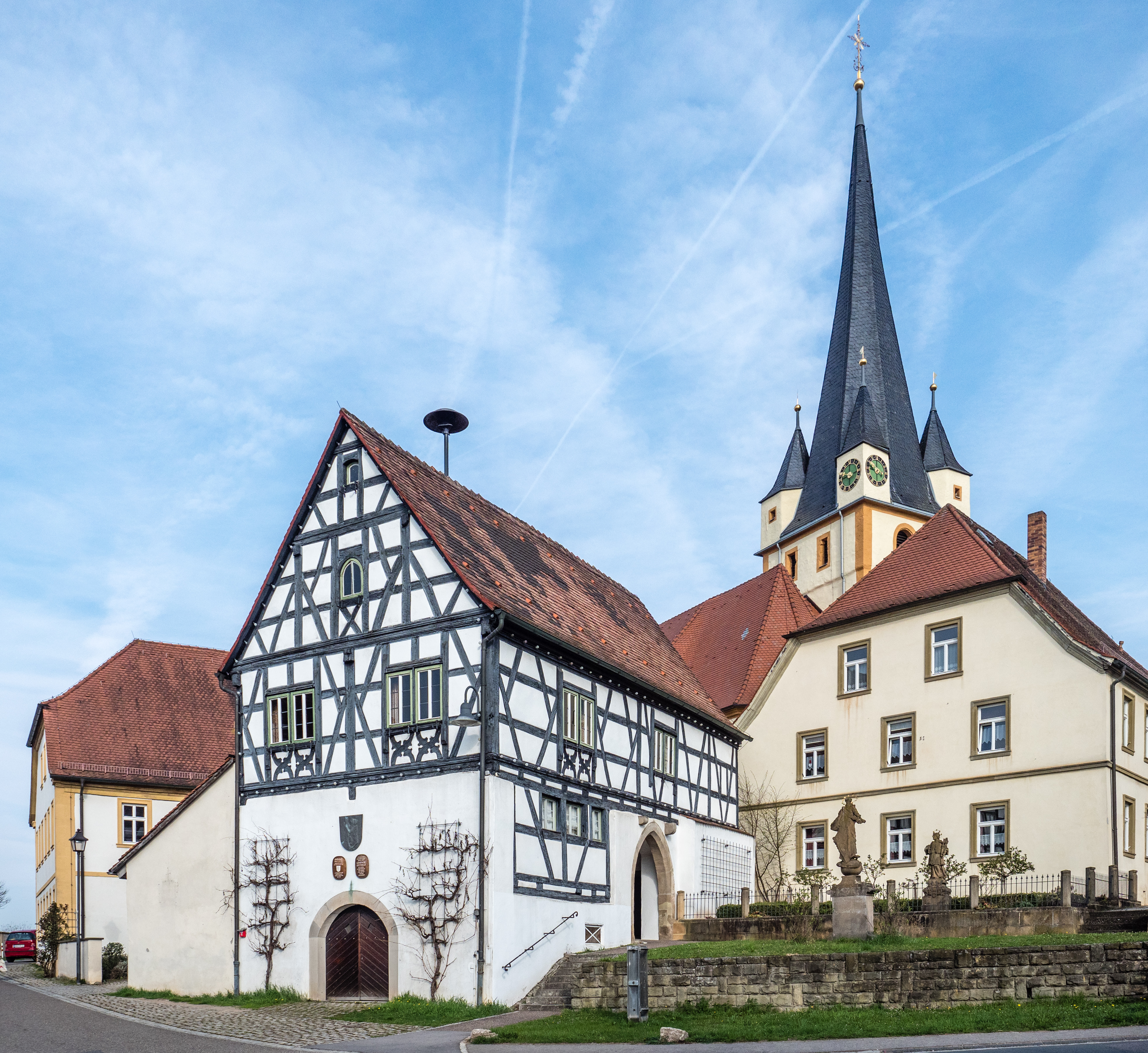
- Town hall (left), rectory (right) with the Church of the Assumption of the Virgin Mary in the back

- Coat of arms

- Location of Stettfeld within Haßberge district
- Interactive map of Stettfeld
- Location within Germany Location within Bavaria
- Coordinates: 49°58′N 10°43′E
- Country: Germany
- State: Bavaria
- Admin. region: Unterfranken
- District: Haßberge
- Municipal assoc.: Ebelsbach

Government
  - Mayor (2020–26): Udo Busch (CSU)

Area
  - Total: 11.16 km^{2} (4.31 sq mi)
- Elevation: 240 m (790 ft)

Population (2025-12-31)
  - Total: 1,107
  - Density: 99.19/km^{2} (256.9/sq mi)
- Time zone: UTC+01:00 (CET)
  - Summer (DST): UTC+02:00 (CEST)
- Postal codes: 96188
- Dialling codes: 09522
- Vehicle registration: HAS
- Website: vg-ebelsbach.de

Stettfeld is a municipality in the district of Haßberge in Bavaria in Germany.
