= Hofheim, Bavaria =

Hofheim in Unterfranken
- Town
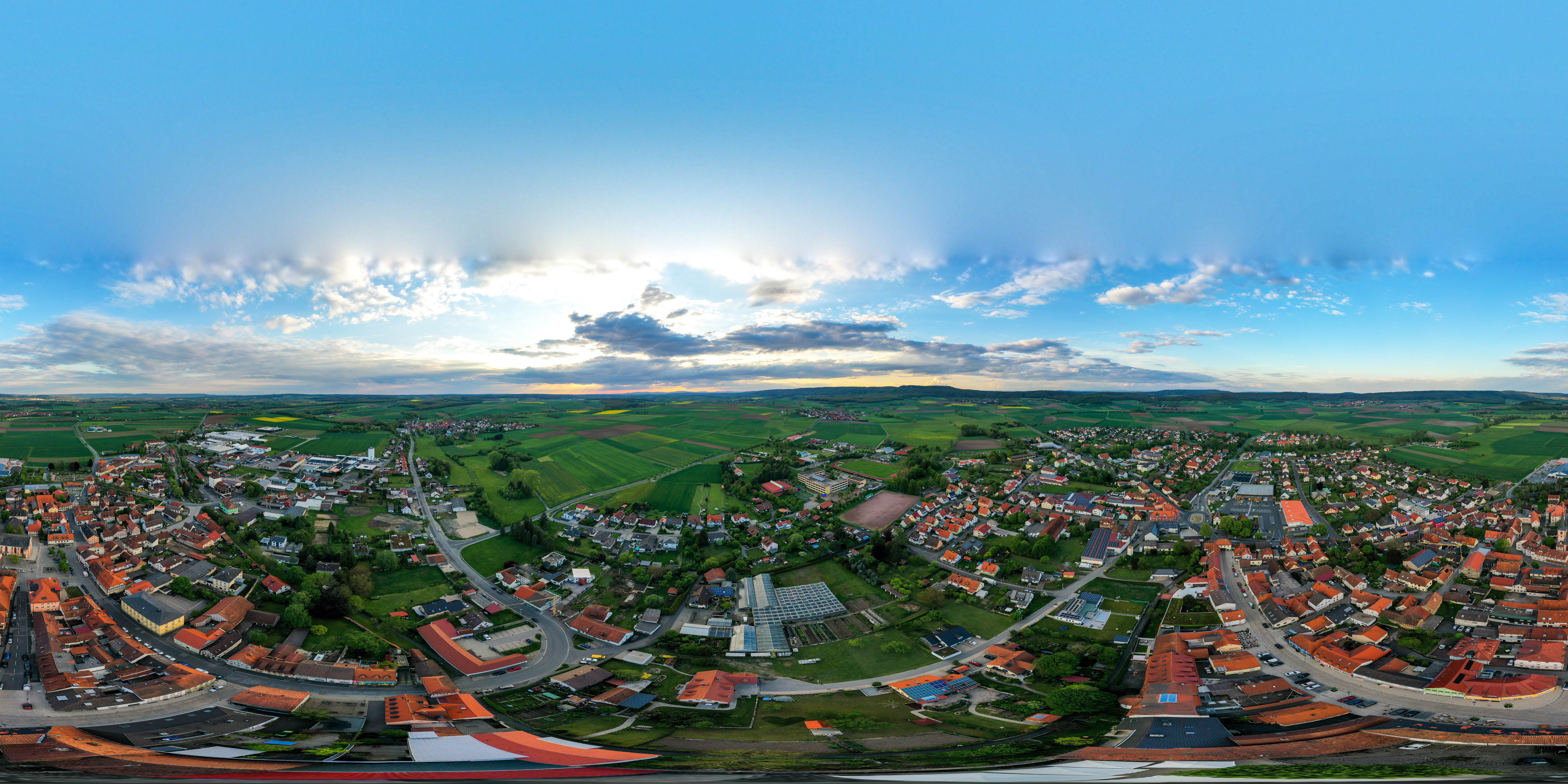
- Aerial panorama of Hofheim

- Coat of arms

- Location of Hofheim in Unterfranken within Haßberge district
- Interactive map of Hofheim in Unterfranken
- Location within Germany Location within Bavaria
- Coordinates: 50°8′N 10°11′E
- Country: Germany
- State: Bavaria
- Admin. region: Lower Franconia
- District: Haßberge
- Municipal assoc.: Hofheim in Unterfranken

Government
  - Mayor (2022–28): Alexander Bergmann (CSU)

Area
  - Total: 56.34 km^{2} (21.75 sq mi)
- Elevation: 250 m (820 ft)

Population (2025-12-31)
  - Total: 5,095
  - Density: 90.43/km^{2} (234.2/sq mi)
- Time zone: UTC+01:00 (CET)
  - Summer (DST): UTC+02:00 (CEST)
- Postal codes: 97461
- Dialling codes: 09523
- Vehicle registration: HAS
- Website: www.stadt-hofheim.de

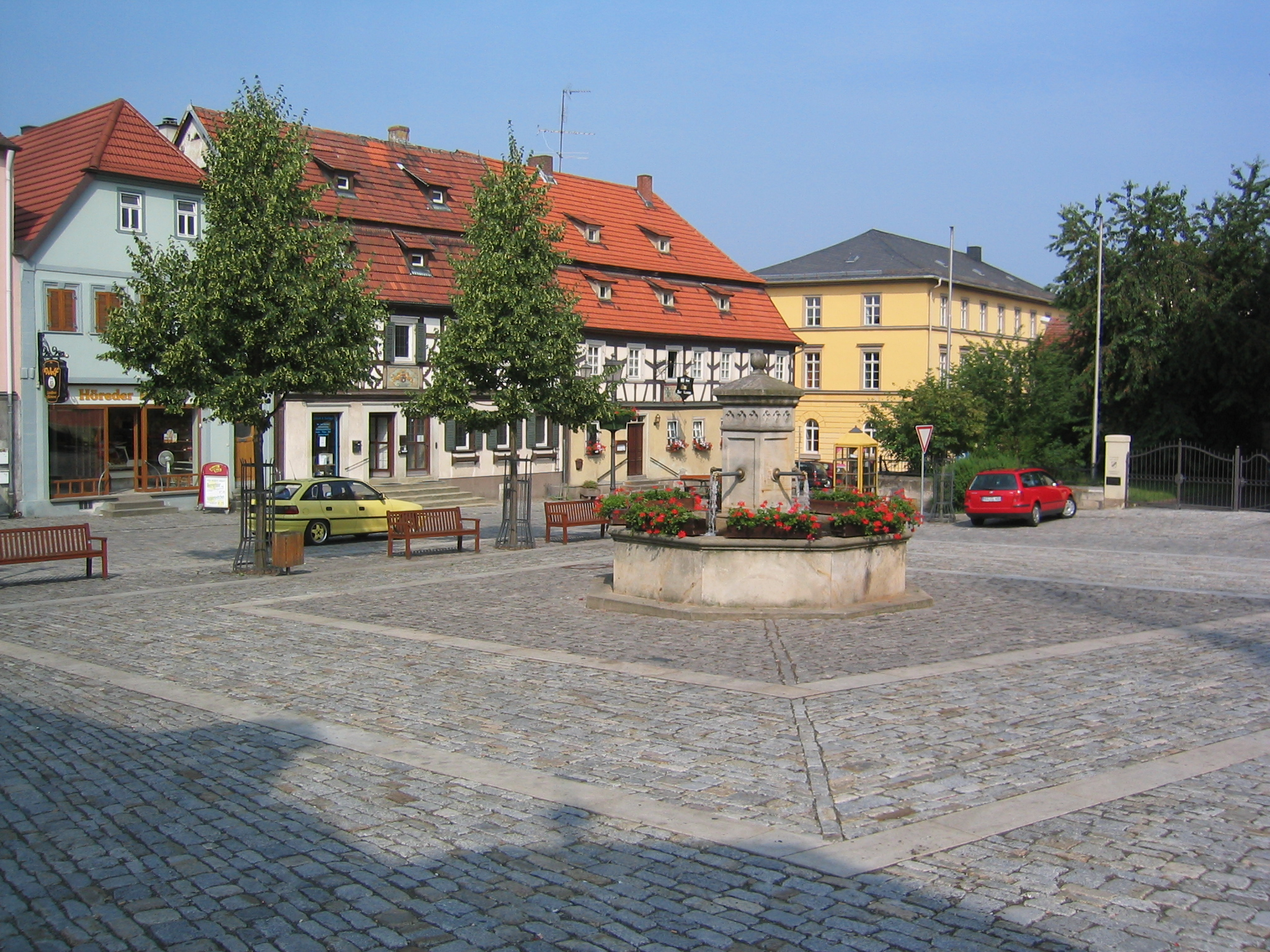
Market square with fountain

Hofheim in Unterfranken (German pronunciation: [ˈhoːfhaɪm ʔɪn ˈʊntɐˌfʁaŋkn̩], lit. 'Hofheim in Lower Franconia') is a town located in the district of Haßberge, Lower Franconia, Bavaria in Germany.

The municipality consists of the town of Hofheim and the villages of Eichelsdorf, Erlsdorf, Goßmannsdorf, Lendershausen, Manau, Ostheim, Reckertshausen, Rügheim and Sulzbach.

Between 1892 and 1995 it also had a branch line to Haßfurt.

Major trades are farming, gardening, fruit-growing, and small industry like metal- and textile-processing and brewing.
