= Altenstein Castle (Lower Franconia) =

- Burg Altenstein
- Maroldsweisach-Altenstein
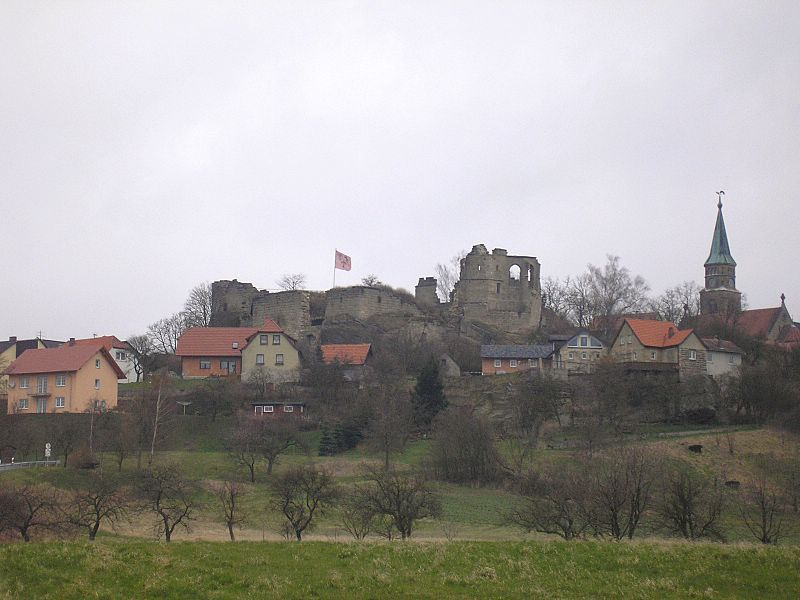
- The castle ruins above the village of Altenstein

Site information
- Type: hill castle
- Code: DE-BY
- Condition: ruin

Location
- Coordinates: 50°10′17″N 10°44′02″E
- Height: 452 m above sea level (NN)

Site history
- Built: first recorded in 1232

Altenstein Castle (German: Burg Altenstein) is a ruined castle in Altenstein (Markt Maroldsweisach) in the district of Haßberge in Lower Franconia, Germany. The family seat of the lords of Stein zu Altenstein, which died out in the 19th century, is located 40 kilometres north of the city of Bamberg and, since the end of the 20th century, has been managed by the district of Haßberge. The castle was renovated around the turn of the millennium.

== Location ==
The ruins of the hill castle lie commandingly over the village of the same name on a ridge (ca. 452 metres above sea level (NN)) in the Haßberge hills between Ebern and Maroldsweisach. The castle hill rises about 150 metres above the Weisach valley.

The elongated ridge on which Altenstein Castle stands is also the site of other fortifications. The Bavarian State Office for Monument Protection has categorized it with the monument serial number D-6-5830-0006. a medieval motte south and below the castle on the Galgenberg ("Gallows Hill").

About two kilometres south of the ruins on the eastern slopes there are two other heritage sites hidden in the forest and both called Altburg ("Old Castle"). Another four kilometres south is the large double castle of Lichtenstein on the side of the valley. The site of the Teufelsstein rock castle below Lichtenstein Castle is the possible family seat of the two lines of the lords of Stein. Above the hamlet of Eyrichshof are the remains of Rotenhan Castle, one of the few rock castles in Germany.

== History ==
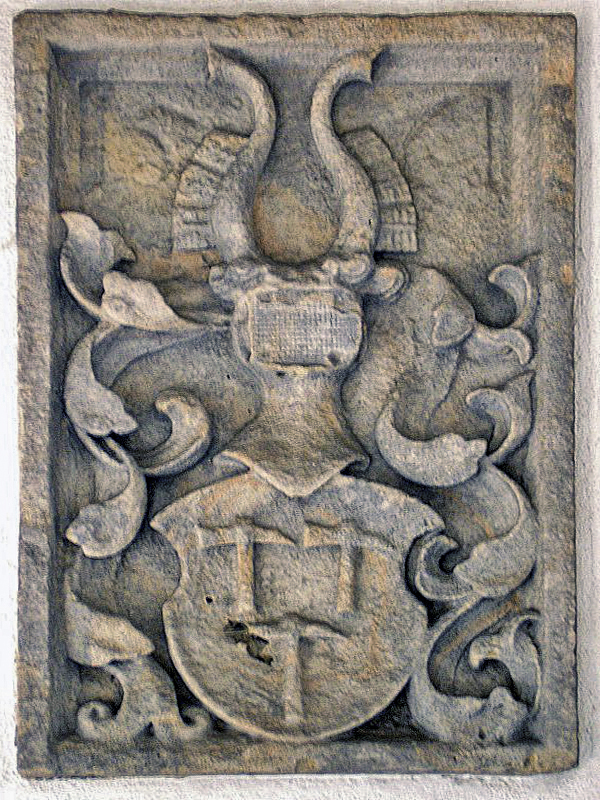
A sculpted coat of arms (Wappenstein), probably 17th century, from the old parish church; now in the porch of the new church

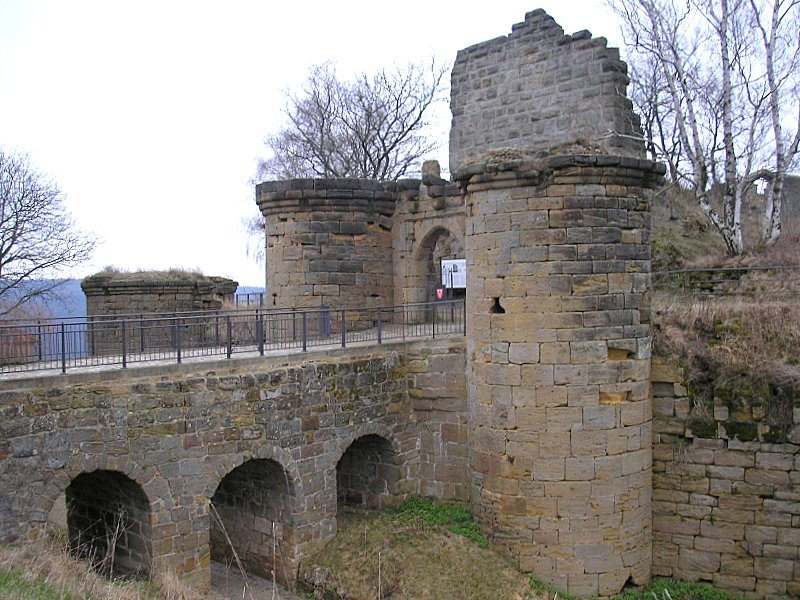
Bridge, gate and bergfried

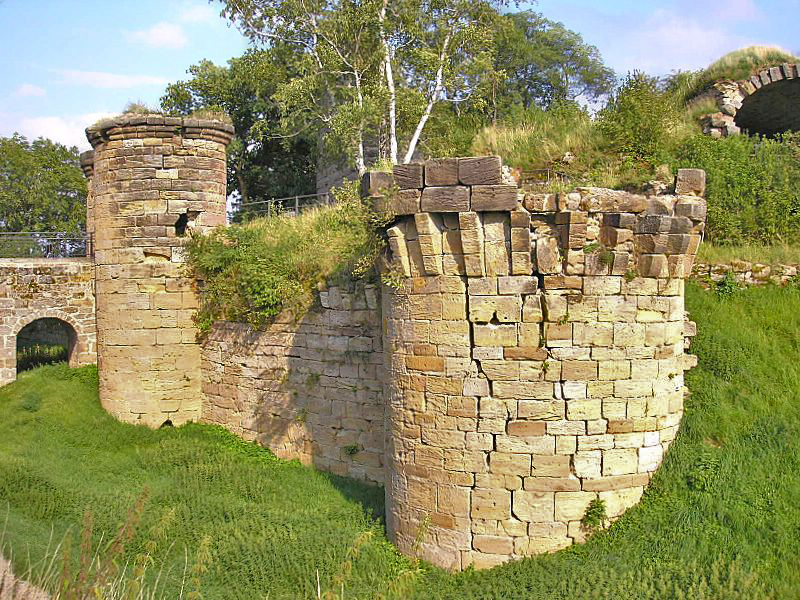
The northwestern fortifications

The castle was the seat of the lords of Stein zu Altenstein. The Steins split into two lines around 1200. The Stein von Lichtenstein ("Steins of Lichtenstein") had their seat at the castle of Lichtenstein. The origin of this family is thought to be the Teufelsstein, a rock castle that used to stand on a site below Lichtenstein Castle.

The originally free knightly family soon had to become vassals of the Prince-Bishops of Würzburg. From the early 14th century the Altensteins only appear as vassals of Würzburg, occasionally of Bamberg, but also had fiefs of the abbeys of Banz and Langheim.

The castle appears to be first mentioned in the sources, indirectly, in 1225. In one document at that time a Marquard Magnus de antiquo lapide is mentioned (i.e. a "Marquard the Great of Altenstein"). In 1231, the castle is first directly referred to as a castrum with an ecclesia (castle with a church).

Over the succeeding centuries the place developed into a typical Ganerbenburg, a castle occupied and run by several branches of the family in common. In 1296 eight families lived at the fortress above the Weisach valley. As one of the earliest records of a so-called Ganerbschaft ("joint inheritance") this fact is of particular interest for castle researchers. A Burgfrieden agreement in 1441 named ten brothers and cousins from five families, each of whom lived in their own cabinets (domestic quarters) in the castle.

The von Altenstein family was able to establish a small territory for itself around the castle during the 14th and 15th centuries. This enabled the scattered allodial lands of the family to be consolidated. The economic success of the castellans of the time can be seen from the impressive structures of the castle that have survived.

In 1525 Altenstein was damaged during the Peasants' War. In 1549 Emperor Charles V granted the high court jurisdiction to the Altensteins. The castellans were allowed, by virtue of the criminal law called the Malefizrecht, to have stocks and a place of execution erected, and thus to sentence criminals to death under the Imperial Court Hanging Law (Reichsgerichtshalsordnung).

In 1567 William of Stein zu Altenstein opposed the Prince-Bishopric of Würzburg during the Grumbach Feud and was therefore executed by sword on the market place at Gotha. The bishopric stripped the family of its fief. After the castle was sacked again during the Thirty Years' War the family fell increasingly on hard times. In 1634 Caspar von Stein was shot dead by marauding mercenaries.

In 1695, Emperor Leopold I elevated John Casimir of Stein zu Altenstein to the rank of imperial free baron (Reichsfreiherrenstand). This only delayed the decline of the family a little, however. At that time there were still three lines of the family: zu Altenstein, Marbach and Ditterswind.

The Steins of Altenstein lived at their family seat until 1703, but then moved down into the valley to their newly built schloss of Pfaffendorf. In 1670, the bishopric asked the castellans, in vain, to rebuild the castle. As a consequence, the castle fell into its present ruined state. In 1768 Christian Adam Louis von Stein sold the manor of Maroldsweisach to Joseph Anton, Baron Horneck of Weinheim. As one of the last estates, the manor in Pfaffendorf went to the barons of Grunelius around 1850.

In 1875, Karl vom Stein zum Altenstein died, the last twig of the German branch of the lords of Altenstein. Finally the castle went in 1895 to the lords of Rotenhan. In 1898 and 1949/50, minor maintenance work was carried out.

The castle ruins were donated to the district of Hassberge in 1972, which now owns and manages them. In 1999, the county began the renovation and development of the site, which was officially completed in 2003.

The most notable member of the von Altenstein family was Karl Sigmund Franz, Baron of Stein zum Altenstein (1770–1840), who is often confused with his namesake and predecessor in office, Heinrich Friedrich Karl vom und zum Stein, the well-known "Baron vom Stein". This Rhineland family has no genealogical connexion with the Franconian Steins of Altenstein.

== Description ==
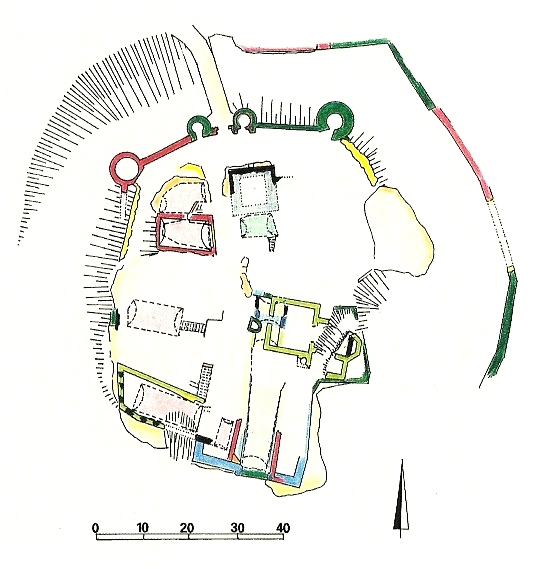
Ground plan of the inner ward on an information board along the "Castle Education Path" (Burgenkundlicher Lehrpfad)

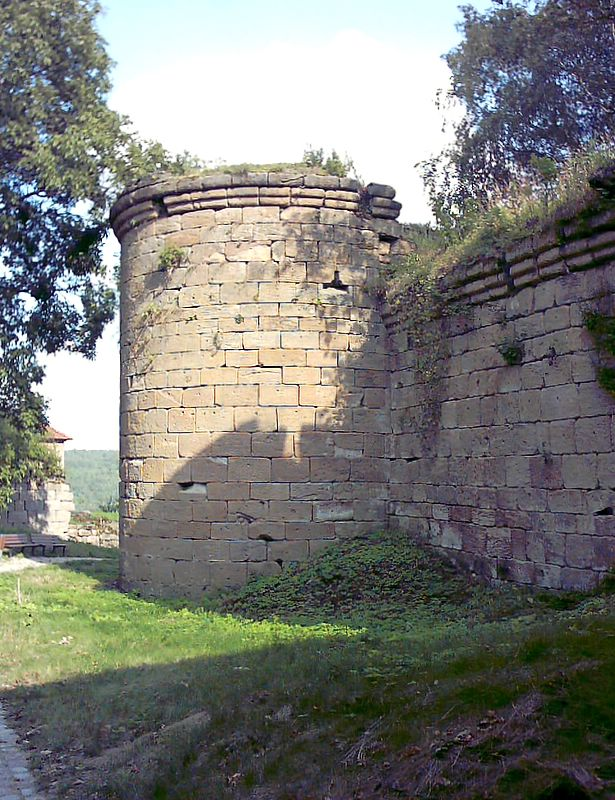
The Hussite period northeast tower (around 1420/30)

The site is one of the largest ruined castles in Franconia. In recent times it has been made safe and accessible by renovation.

The site is entered through the gatehouse (17th/18th century) of the outer ward (Vorburg), which is being used again as a residence. This outer bailey probably goes back to the 13th century and guarded the entrance to the Romanesque castle. The southeastern parts of the outer ward were supported by a high revetment (Futtermauer) with flying buttresses (Flugbögen).

An 18th-century stone bridge crosses the neck ditch, about 15 metres wide, to the main gate which is flanked by two round towers. This entrance is part of the massive Hussite Zwinger, built around 1430, in front of the older inner ward. At that time the main gate was moved to its present location. The original gate on the south side was walled up.

The gate entrance dates to the period around 1567. The Hussite era gate was somewhat lower, according to 2002 archaeological documents. Over the entranceway, a bretèche guards the access. A rather eroded coat of arms with the three hammers of the Steins is flanked by shield bearers. The two round towers on either side each had three unvaulted storeys with T-shaped keyhole embrasures or T-embrasures with low bases.

On either side of the gateway, there are short curtain walls with two more round towers. The whole of the middle ward had already been planned with firearms in mind. Of the Hussite era, only the eastern part remains; the western area of the castle, with its plain corbels dates to a remodelling in 1567.

Behind the gateway rise the ruins of the late Romanesque bergfried or keep, whose north wall still reaches a height of about 10 metres. The originally square main tower had sides 9.8 metres long. Only parts of the outer shell have survived; the wall being constructed of closely packed rusticated ashlars with narrow channels the remains of the infill being made of herringbone pattern bricks (Opus spicatum). The ashlars had to be set in place using the old lifting device, the three-legged lewis, however, so that the front face had no lifting marks. The raised entrance was on the south side facing the castle courtyard.

At the foot of the tower a garderobe shaft indicates that the original neck ditch was located immediately in front of the bergfried. The main entrance of the Romanesque castle was probably in the vicinity of the present gate - a reconstruction by Joachim Zeune, a German medieval archaeologist - but was later moved to the south side. During the period of the Hussite attacks, this new gate was walled up and the surviving double tower gate built for security reasons on the uphill side.

Past the ruins of the jointly inherited estate (a Ganerbentum) the castle courtyard features the remains of the palas in the southwest, the castle well and the Late Gothic castle chapel. The extensive vaulted cellars, some hewn out of the rock, were largely closed off during the restoration work for bat conservation reasons, and are only accessible on special occasions. The cellars under the palas and the above-ground vault of the Ganerben residence next to the bergfried are freely accessible.

The castle ruins stand on very unstable subsoil. The massive Rhaetian sandstone rocks are sliding slowly down the castle hill and collapses still occur today. For example, in 1960, three vaults, placed one above the other over the old gateway, substantially collapsed. Two decades later the wall in the old gateway area also fell down. Its lower section, with the added gateway, has survived. Static stabilisation measures were taken in recent years.

Since 2003 a circular walk has enabled visitors to walk around the whole of the inner ward and also previously inaccessible parts of the castle.

The castle is a waystation on the Haßberge Castle Educational Path of the district of Haßberge.

=== Chapel ===
The ruined castle chapel on the eastern side of the castle was first built in 1438. It had to be rebuilt when the Prince-Bishop of Würzburg, John II of Brunn, elevated the old chapel to become the parish church of the village. The chapel was dedicated to St. Nicholas and the Blessed Virgin Mary. By 1563, however, it was decided to build a separate parish church on a plateau in front of the castle gate. This building was demolished in 1908/09 in favour of the surviving neo-Romanesque church, but it is well documented in the 1916 inventory volume.

The chapel comprised a rectangular nave with an attached choir with net vaulting (Netzgewölbe) at the eastern end. The nave rests on the barrel vault of the old south gate. Below the choir was clearly the crypt for the castellans. The presbyterium was built on a rather older wall course. It may have appeared as part of the strengthening of the fortifications during the Hussite raids and projects towards the south. The tower-like attachment south of the choir has survived up to the second floor (rear part) and is divided by two ledges (Kaffgesimse). Small rectangular window openings once lit the interior of the ground floor room with its two groin vaults. An elevated door in the east wall leads to the projection (Vorsprung) of the old wall. In front of the tower, the outer walls of a staircase tower is visible; this was also accessible from the nave. Entry to the extension was through an inflexed arch in the wall of the choir.

The choir is supported outside by once stepped buttresses with gothic arch windows between them. In the eastern window the original tracery has survived.

Nave and choir are separated by a profiled choir arch. Decorative shields can still be made out on the rib intersections on the net vaulting above the choir. Only the base of the original wall survives on the north side of the nave, the remaining material was changed during an inappropriately executed renovation. Like the rest of the castle, the chapel walls were made out of the Rhaetian sandstone on which it was built. The regular ashlars were set in place with an external lewis (scissor tongs or Mauerzange) which left marks on the stone. The inventory mentions numerous fragments of gravestones in the chapel floor. Around 1980, some pieces could still be seen, which have since disappeared or become concealed.

The gradual slippage of the castle rock caused the chapel walls to lean. During comprehensive renovation work, started in 2000, the structure was stabilized for the long term.

== Literature ==
- Die Kunstdenkmäler des Königreichs Bayern, III, 15, Bezirksamt Ebern, S. 17–24 (München, 1916).
- Joachim Zeune: Burgen im Eberner Land. Ebern 2003, Eberner Heimatblätter, 2 Hefte.
- Joachim Zeune: Burgruine Altenstein. Regensburg 2003.
- Isolde Maierhöfer: Ebern (Historischer Atlas von Bayern, Teil Franken, Heft 15). München, 1964.
