= Ganerbenburg =

Type of castle

A Ganerbenburg (plural: Ganerbenburgen) is a castle occupied and managed by several families or family lines at the same time. These families shared common areas of the castle including the courtyard, well, and chapel, whilst maintaining their own private living quarters. They occurred primarily in medieval Germany.

== Ganerbenburgen and Ganerbschaft ==
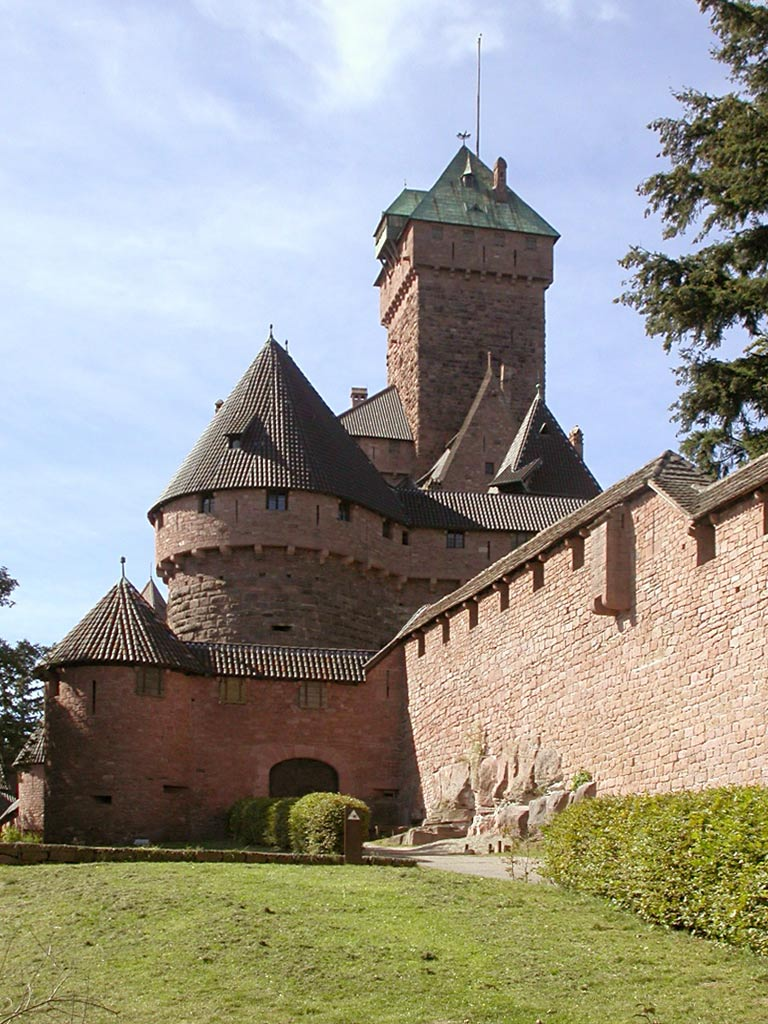
One of the earliest known examples of a joint inheritance or Ganerbschaft: the reconstructed Hohkönigsburg in Alsace

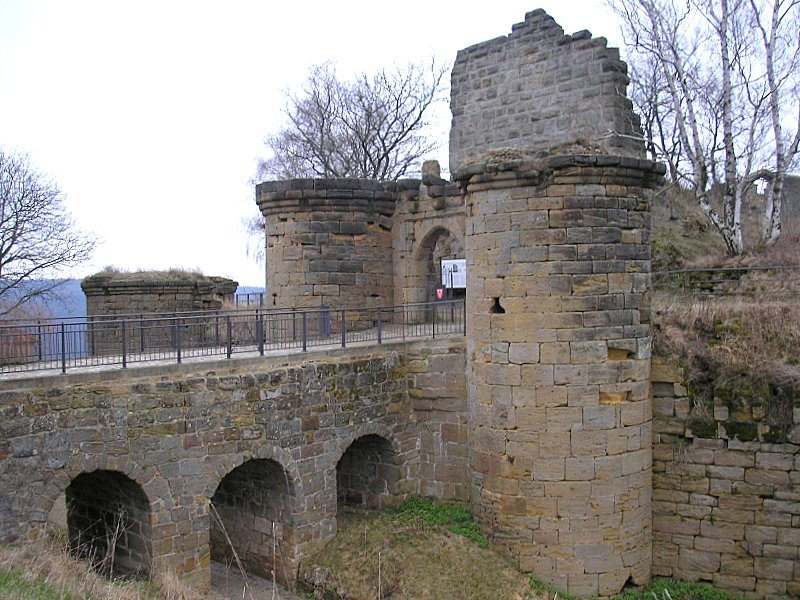
One of the largest castle ruins in Franconia: Altenstein near Maroldsweisach

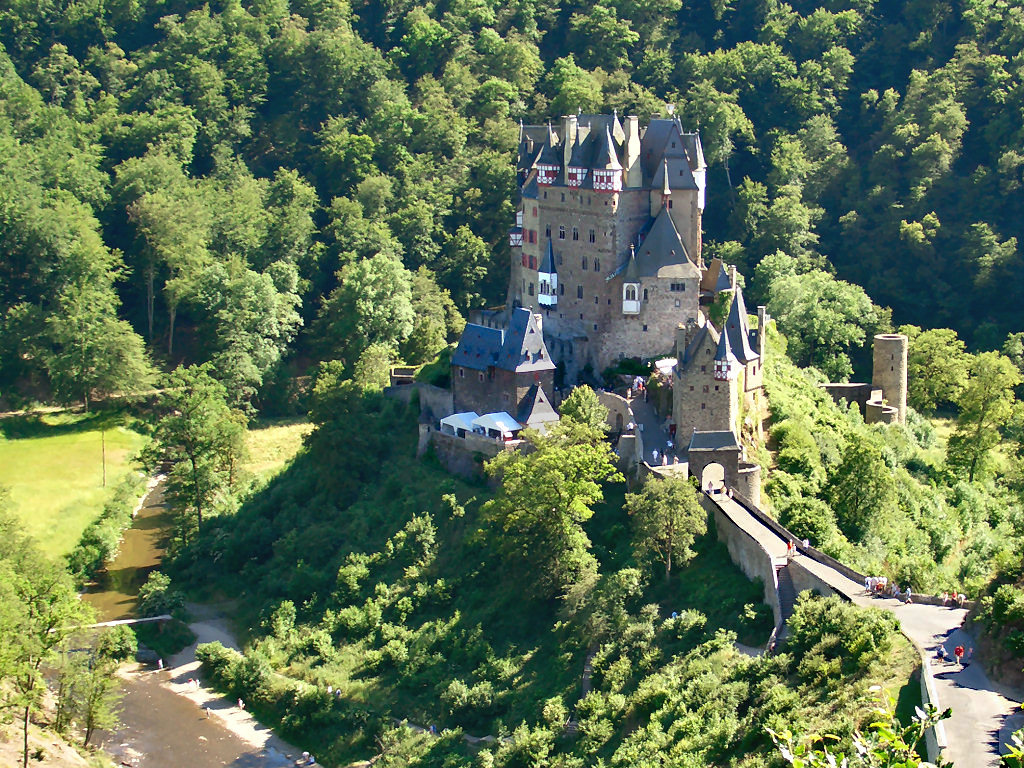
The "multi-family castle" of Eltz on the Moselle

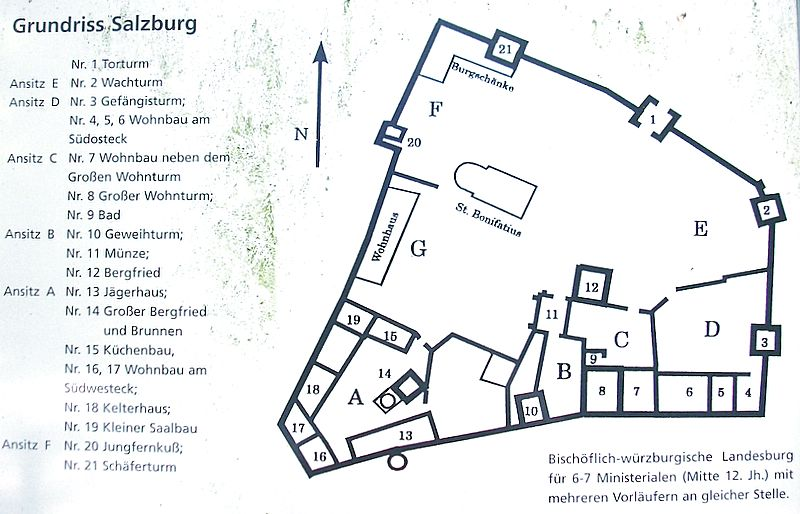
Plan of Franconia's Salzburg Castle above Bad Neustadt

The German word ganerbe appears in the Middle High German romance, Parzival, written by Wolfram von Eschenbach around 1200. The legal term Ganerbschaft appears from textual evidence to go back at least to the second half of the 9th century. In Old High German, gan meant "common", "joint" or "commoner". Accordingly, the term Ganerbenburg may be roughly translated as "common inheritors' castle". The first historically verifiable Ganerbschaft arrangement appears in the 13th century in Alsace at the castle of Haut-Kœnigsbourg.

Ganerbenburgen often came about as a result of a type of inheritance known as a Ganerbschaft ("Common/Joint Inheritance"). Each branch of the family built, usually, their own residential building within a common curtain wall. Sometimes these residences were expanded into independent castles in their own right within the common castle site. Ganerbenburgen also resulted from the sale of parts of a castle in times of financial hardship or through the pledging or enfeoffment of an element of the castle.

The castles of powerful feudal lords were often planned from the outset as Ganerbenburgen. Each castellan or Burgmann was responsible for the management and defence of a sector of the castle. This was not just for practical reasons; the higher nobility naturally wanted to limit the power of their liegemen (Dienstmannen). A good example of this is the Franconian castle of Salzburg near Bad Neustadt an der Saale, a castle enfeoffed (Lehensburg) by the Würzburg bishops.

Ganerbenburgen that had evolved were sometimes forced to submit to the suzerainty of more powerful feudal lords. The Würzburg chronicler, Lorenz Fries, mentioned three such examples in his bishop's chronicle. In 1458, the joint lords of Steckelberg Castle near Schlüchtern refused access to the bishop and attempted to modernize the castle fortifications. Bishop John III of Grumbach eventually asserted his authority after a military conflict.

In 1478, despite an imperial mandate, the mighty imperial city of Nuremberg had to acquiesce to Count Palatine Otto II of Mosbach selling Rothenberg Castle above Schnaittach to a community of 44 Franconian knights. This group of knights wanted to build a strong bulwark against competition from the rich citizens, who they deeply mistrusted. Significantly, the higher nobility were denied co-ownership; only the most important Franconian families from the lesser nobility were permitted to participate in joint ownership.

== Legal foundations ==
A legal requirement for the establishment of a Ganerbschaft was the enfeoffment of the castle estate to the gesamten Hand ("whole hand"), in other words, all the feoffees were given equal possession of the fief, an arrangement described as hantgemal. All were given the same rights over their inheritance; they managed a common budget and, where appropriate, had certain officers and judges in common.

The so-called hantgemal agreement was particularly important for laying down the social privileges and estate rights of the noble families involved. A joint inheritance or Ganerbschaft ensured that all family members had this special status and prevented their social status being lowered.

As the number of co-heirs increased, ownership interests and rights were defined and assigned. Externally, however, it appeared like a closed community, and the division of the estate could be somewhat notional. Each heir had a share known as the Marzahl and these shares could vary in size. A Mutschierung was an internal agreement over rights of usage. Each joint owner was able to run their own household, but the overall joint community was maintained.

Full enfeoffment to co-heirs was practised in some territories up to the 15th century, thereafter it was enacted through a vassal, a Gesamthänder.

Other Ganerbschaften were first established by Burgfrieden agreements, for example following the purchase or seizure by force of the castle. Such agreements could also be dissolved. The Ganerbschaft was also terminated if a party to it was able to take possession of the entire estate.

Where the co-heirs agreed internally to a division of the whole land and property, the Ganerbschaft was usually wound up. This so-called Totteilung (Watschar or Watschierung), allowed the former co-heirs unrestricted disposal of their ownership interest. But, against that, they lost rights to the remaining common estate. The defence obligations of the entire castle still had to be maintained, however.

This often not very smooth communal existence of the co-heirs and their families was governed by the so-called Burgfrieden ("castle peace"). Often the co-heirs used the central facilities of the castle, such as the bergfried or chapel, jointly. The community usually chose one of the castellans (Burgmannen) as the master builder and set up a join fund, which financed the necessary cost of maintenance of the entire estate. Much like a modern homeowner association, people held an annual meeting to discuss any problems.

The original purpose of Ganerbschaft, to preserve a property without dividing it, soon proved in practice to be no longer tenable. Ganerbenburgen sometimes had up to 50, in individual cases over 80, different joint owners, not all of whom were able to live in the castle. In the case of a feud, the attacker had to be very careful only to besiege the part of the castle owned by their enemy, without infringing the rights of neutral co-heirs.

Many Ganerbschaften were turned into a fee tail in the Late Middle Ages. A member of the family association or community governed by the agreement would be the owner of the undivided and inalienable estate, but his powers were very restricted.

== Distribution ==
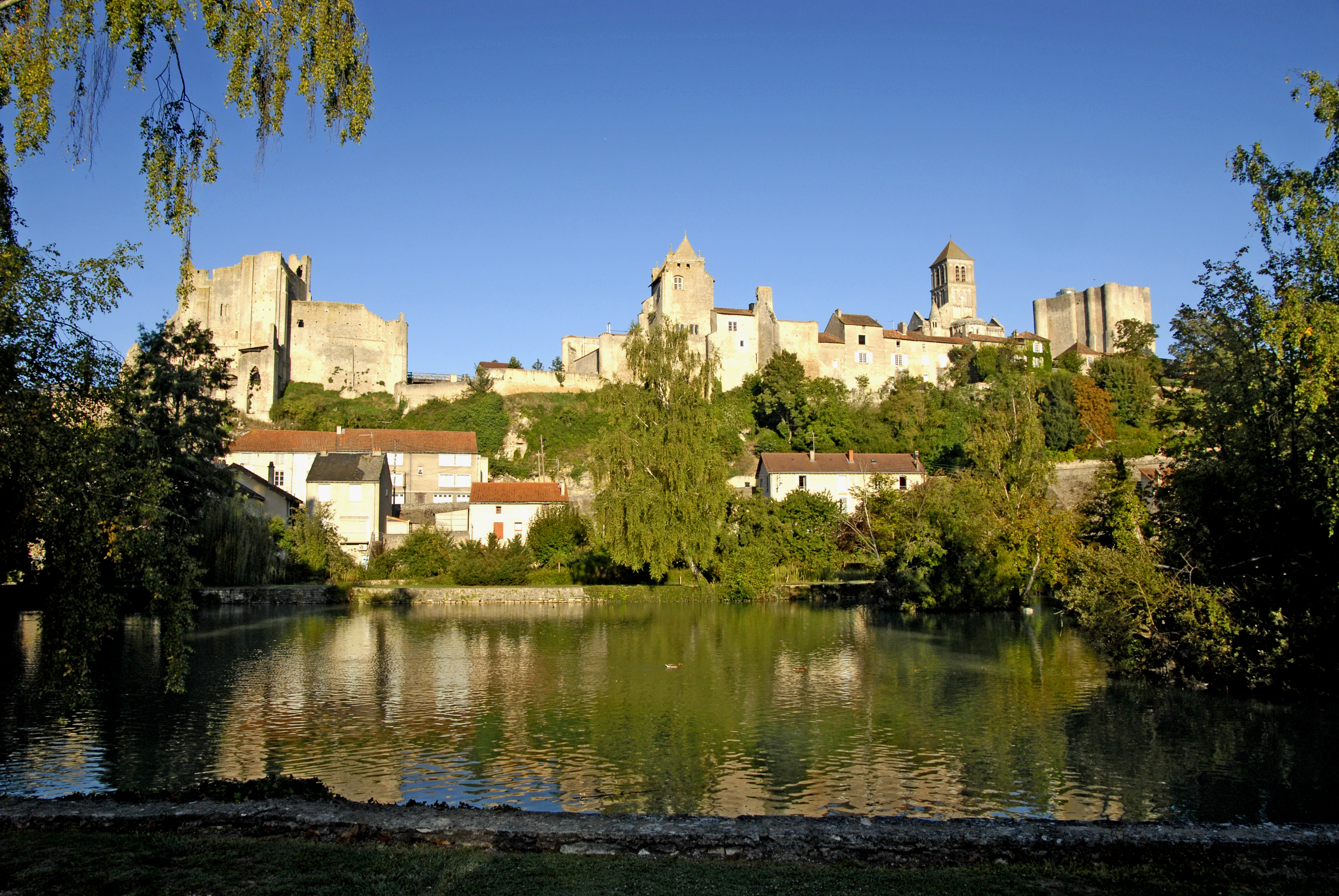
The five castle seats of the Oberstadt of Chauvigny

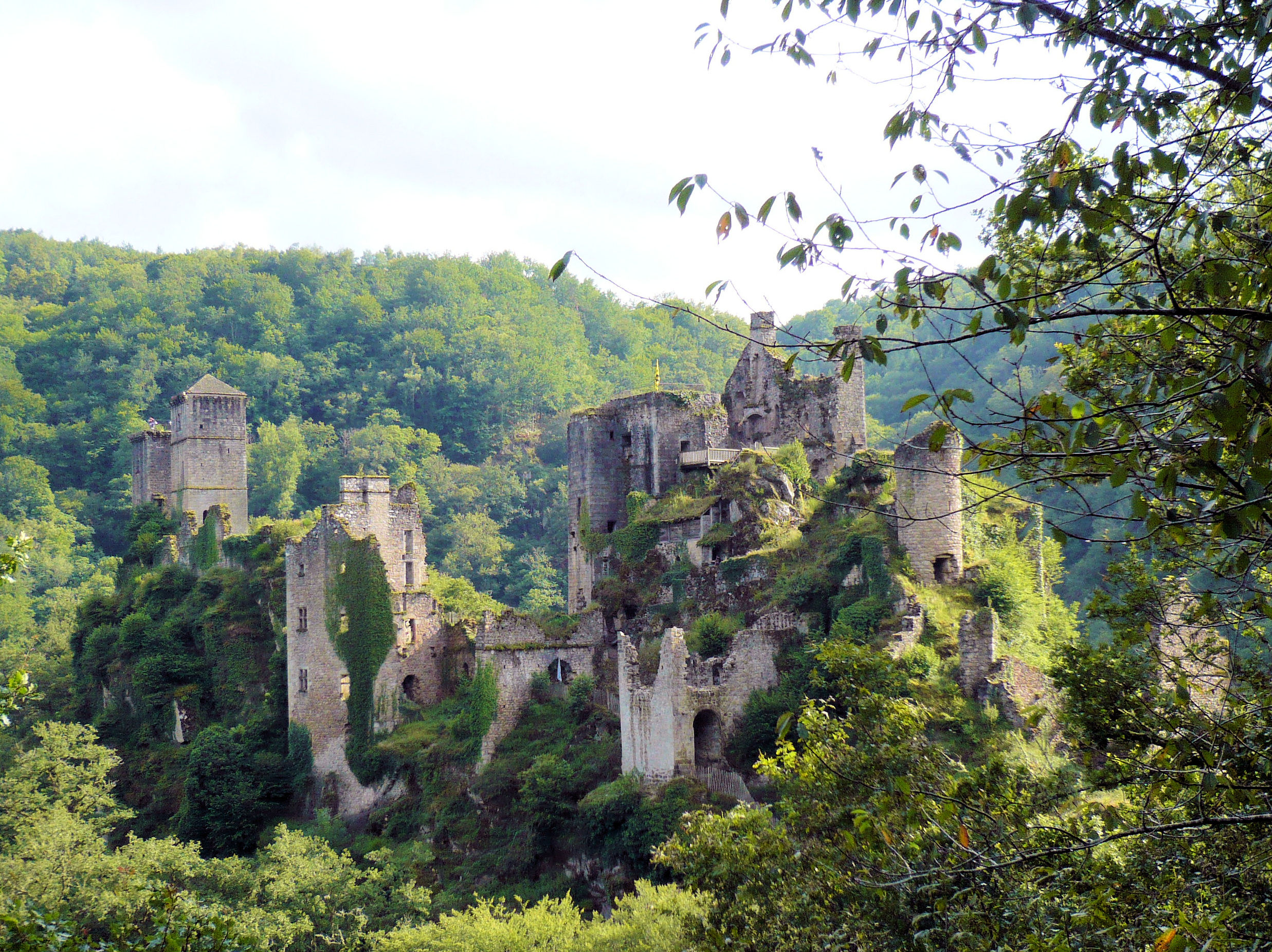
The Tours de Merle in the Limousin

Ganerbenburgen are predominantly found in Central Europe. The majority were established in those territories that were the most subdivided: Franconia, Hesse, the Rhine Valley, and Swabia. The Ganerbschaft was also very common in the states of Baden, Württemberg and the Alsace. In regions in which multiple inheritance or enfeoffment (Gesamtbelehnung or gesamte Hand) was uncommon, such as Silesia, Mecklenburg and Holstein, no Ganerbschaften are recorded.

In France and England, by contrast, large castles were usually in the hands of a single powerful feudal lord. This is mainly due to the different way that feudalism developed in those countries.

Several examples of large "multi-family castles" have survived, especially in southern France and the Massif Central. Foremost among these are the Tours de Merle (Saint-Geniez-ô-Merle, Corrèze). Also in the Limousin is the smaller castle of Château de Saint-Hilaire et des Plas at Curemonte. In north and central France, too, several very large castles ended up as joint enfeoffments, such as the giant castle of Chauvigny (Vienne).

The best known example of a central European Ganerbenburg is Eltz Castle on the Moselle river. Other examples include: Lichtenstein Castle, Altenstein Castle in Lower Franconia, Windeck Castle near Bühl in Baden, Salzburg Castle in Bad Neustadt an der Saale, Liebenstein on the Rhine, Leonrod Castle in Dietenhofen and Lindheim Castle in the Wetterau.

== Literature ==
- Karl Friedrich Alsdorf: Untersuchungen zur Rechtsgestalt und Teilung deutscher Ganerbenburgen. Dissertation. Universität Köln 1979. Lang, Frankfurt am Main etc., 1980, ISBN 3-8204-6408-5 (Rechtshistorische Reihe. Vol. 9).
- Christoph Bachmann: Ganerbenburgen. In: Deutsche Burgenvereinigung by Horst Wolfgang Böhme (ed.): Burgen in Mitteleuropa. Ein Handbuch. Vol. 2: Geschichte und Burgenlandschaften. Theiss, Stuttgart 1999, ISBN 3-8062-1355-0, pp. 39–41.
- Henning Becker: Familiensoziologische Untersuchungen hessischer Ganerbenfamilien des 14. bis 17. Jahrhunderts am Beispiel der Schenken zu Schweinsberg und der von Hatzfeld. Dissertation. Freie Universität Berlin, 1983. Berlin, 1983.
- Horst W. Böhme, Reinhard Friedrich, Barbara Schock-Werner (Hrsg.): Wörterbuch der Burgen, Schlösser und Festungen. Reclam, Stuttgart, 2004, ISBN 3-15-010547-1, pp. 135–136.
- Helmut Flachenecker: Die Salzburg – eine Ganerbenburg als zentraler Ort. In: Heinrich Wagner, Joachim Zeune (ed.): Das Salzburgbuch. Stadt Bad Neustadt, Bad Neustadt, 2008, ISBN 978-3-939959-04-5, pp. 257–266.
- Joachim Zeune: „… für etlich ganerben etlicher schlosz …“ Ganerbenburgen in Unterfranken. In: Schönere Heimat. Erbe und Auftrag. 89, 2000, ISSN 0177-4492, pp. 83–90.
