= Ganerbschaft =

Historical Germanic inheritance law

A Ganerbschaft (plural: Ganerbschaften in German), according to old German inheritance law, was a joint family estate, mainly land, over which the co-heirs (Ganerben) only had rights in common. In modern German legal parlance it corresponds to a "community of joint ownership" (Gesamthandsgemeinschaft or Gemeinschaft zur gesamten Hand).

== History ==
Ganerbschafts arose as a result of the simultaneous nomination of several co-heirs to the same estate. This occurred mainly in the Middle Ages for reasons of family politics.

The subject of such legal relationships was usually a jointly-built or conquered castle or palace, which was then referred to as a Ganerbenburg ("common inheritance castle"). The peaceful coexistence of the heirs, the rules by which they lived daily, side by side, and the rights of use of common facilities were usually comprehensively regulated by so-called Burgfrieden agreements.

Ganerbschaften were established in order to keep an important family property, such as a castle, without dividing it or disposing of it. Although the initially very close community of co-heirs (Ganerben) tended to become looser over the decades, the unity of the estate to the outside world was maintained. This often expressed itself through the use of a common family and emblem.

Another form of inheritance that permitted similar arrangements was the fee tail (Fideikommiss).

== Examples ==
=== Künzelsau in Hohenlohekreis ===
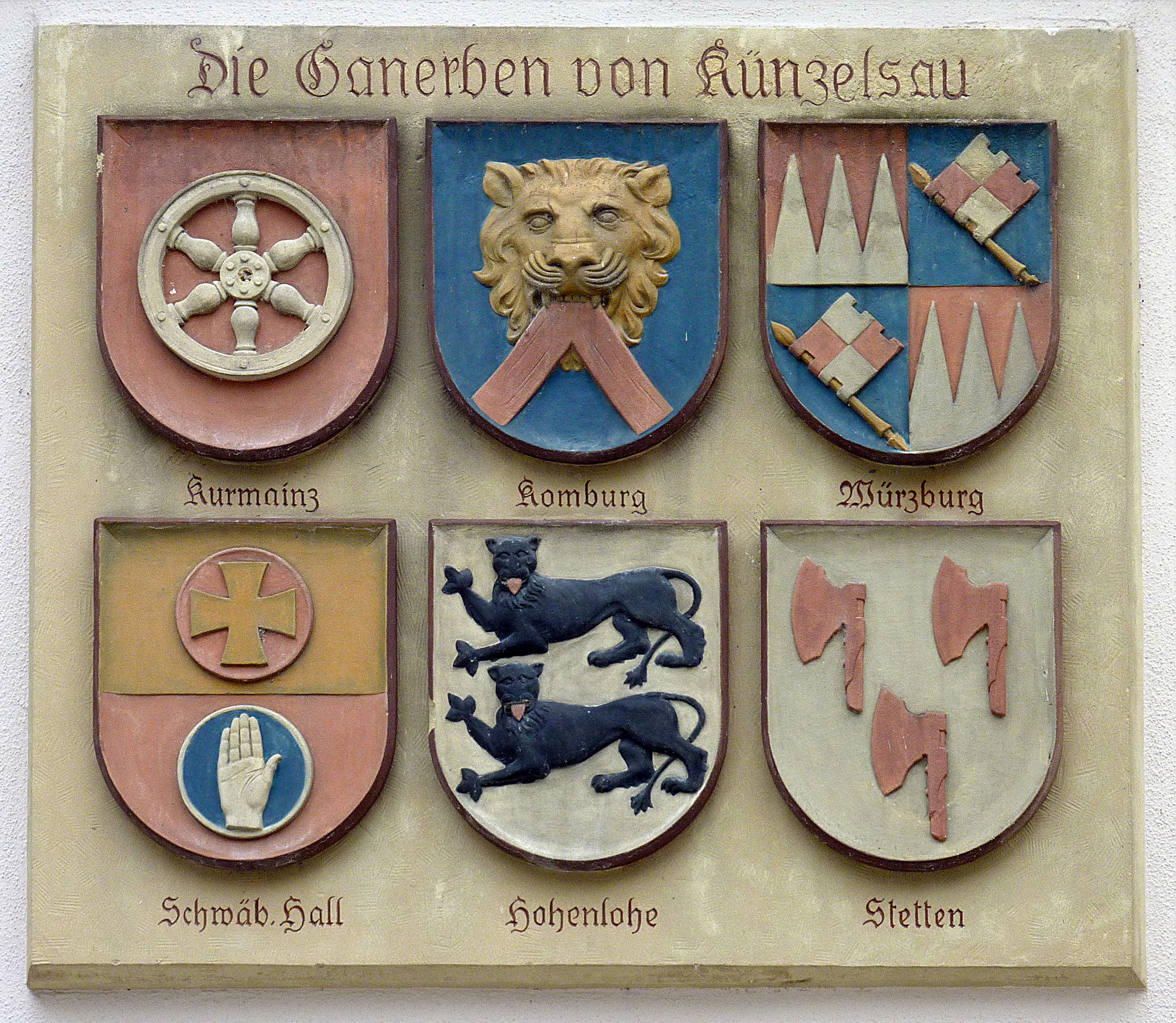
Coats of arms of the co-heirs on the Old Town Hall in Künzelsau

In the late 11th century, the von Stein family, owners of Künzelsau (today in the county of Hohenlohekreis), was about to die out. One of the last members of the family, Mechthild von Stein, donated a large portion of her estates to Comburg Abbey. On her death, the remaining part of the estate went to her close relatives: the lords of Künzelsau and the lords of Bartenau. Over the centuries, the divisions of the estate were inherited, partly or wholly purchased or went into other hands by marriage.

Around 1500 the lords of Stetten owned 25% of Künzelsau, 20% belonged to the House of Hohenlohe and 15% to the imperial town of Schwäbisch Hall. Another 10% was owned by the Archbishopric of Mainz, the Bishopric of Würzburg owned 10%, and 20% was divided amongst various individuals (Sulmeister von Hall, Ritter von Bachenstein, Berlichingen, Crailsheim, Neuenstein etc.).

In the period that followed the division of the estate changed hands many times. Following the Tierberg Feud of 1488 a burgfrieden treaty was agreed in 1493 that governed the joint management of the estate under a Gemeinschaftlichen Ganerben-Amts-Schultheißen ("Common Ganerben Office Sheriff"). The co-heirs pledged themselves henceforth only to transfer their share of the estate to one another, not to anyone outside the community. Only Comburg Abbey was allowed, in 1717, to buy the share of the estate belonging to the lords of Stetten, because they had formerly been members of the Ganerbschaft.

In 1802 the estate lost its status as a Ganerbschaft in the wake of secularisation, and the castle and lands all went to the imperial princes of Hohenlohe. However, in 1806 the whole estate was seized by the Duke of Württemberg and became part of the Kingdom of Württemberg.

=== Trappstadt ===
In the 13th century Trappstadt was divided by the counts of Henneberg and the monasteries of Theres and Veilsdorf. Three hundred years later in 1524, there were already twelve Ganerben issued.

The possession of the Ganerben quarters were divided as follows:

- The residents of Würzburg (former Theres Abbey) had 22 houses.
- Monastery Veilsdorf (from 1699 cathedral chapter of Würzburg) had 28 houses.
- Henneberg family (from 1584 Saxony) had 22 houses.
- Nine houses since 1524 were owned: Schott (until 1585), Echter (until 1665), Faust von Stromberg (until 1738), Grafen von Eltz until 1824).

=== Other Ganerbschafts ===
- Ahrenthal: von Wildberg, von Effern, Meerscheid von Hillesheim, von Spee
- Burg Altenstein: von Stein zum Altenstein, von Horneck zu Weinheim
- Alten Limpurg: von Horneck, Frankfurter Patriziat
- Assenheim: Hessen-Kassel, von Isenburg- Waechtersbach, Solms Roedelheim
- Bechtolsheim: von Mauchenheim, von Dalberg, Knebel von Katzenelnbogen, von Dienheim, von Hallberg, von Sturmfeder- Oppenweiler, von Wallbrunn, Beckers, von Boyneburg, Nebel zu Rabenau, Nordeck von Westerstetten, von Partenheim, Mertz von Quirnheim, von Weyers.
- Belsenberg: von Hohenlohe, Wuerttemberg
- Bennhausen: Mauchenheim,
- Binzburg: von Erthal, von Frankenstein, von Sickingen, von Dalberg, von Cronberg,
- Birkenau: von Wambold, von Dalberg-Dalberg, von Frankenberg
- Boenningheim: von Stadion-Warthausen, Erzstift Mainz (1401-1785), von Gemmingen, von Neipperg, von Sachsenheim, von Kronech, von Liebenstein.
- Breidenbacker Grund in Biederkoff (Battenberg): Hessen-Darmstadt, von Breidenbach
- Breiteneck: von Montfort, von Gumppenberg
- Buchenau: von Buchenau, von Warsdorf, von Boyneburg (Spiegel Schloss), Propstei Fulda, Schenk von Schweinsberg (Bergbau).
- Busecker Tal: von Buseck, Hesse-Kassel
- Burg Liebenstein am Rhein: Archbishopric of Trier, Nassau-Dillingen, Pleuschen von Liebenstein
- Buerresheim: Archbishopric of Cologne, von Breidbach
- Layen Castle: von Eltz, von Fuersterwaerther
- Windeck Castle near Buehl: Hochstift Strassburg, Abtei Schwarzach, von Windeck
- Dalberg: von Dalberg
- Dirmstein: Riesmann, Qaudt zu Wyckradt, von Sturmfeder
- Dittelsheim: Kurfuerstertum Pfalz, von Dalberg
- Dornheim: Hessen-Kassel
- Eltz Castle: von Eltz
- Falkenstein, Stolzenberg: Austria, Pfalz
- Fraenkisch Krumbach: von Erbach, 2/4 von Gemmingen-Hornberg, von Pettlack
- Friedberg: Staedter Patriziat
- Freisenheim in Bingen: von Dienheim
- Gabsheim: von Dalberg-Hessloch, von Geispotzheim
- Stadt Gelnhausen: Staedter Patriziat, Hessen-Kassel
- Hassfuerth, Iphofen: Brandenburg-Ansbach, Hochstift Wuerzburg
- Hattstein: Archbishopric of Mainz, Nassau-Usingen, Waldbott von Bassenheim
- Hillesheim: Austria, Hatzfeld-Glaichau, von Spee, Isenburg, Riaucour
- Karlsmund: Hesse-Kassel, Nassau-Weilburg,
- Kneschke (Kassel): von der Malsburg
- Kronberg: Archbishopric of Mainz, Hesse-Darmstadt
- Kuenzelsau, Comburg and Bartenau: Archbishopric of Mainz, Bishopric of Wuerzburg, von Stetten, von Hohenlohe, Stadt Schwaebisch Hall, von Crailsheim, von Berlichingen, Sulmeister von Hall, von Bachenstein.
- Landskron (Ahrweiler): von Manderscheid, von Plettenberg, von Harff, von Eltz, Waldbott von Bassenheim, von der Leyen, von Clodt, von Stein, Quadt zu Wykradt, von Nesselrode-Rath, Sombreffe.
- Langenau: von Eltz-Langenau, von Eltz Risbenau, Wolff-Metternich
- Lengsfeld: Provostry of Fulda, Apel-Reckrodt, Schade-Leipolds, von Pfersdorf, von Boyneburg, von Herbilstadt, von Mueller.
- Leutersdorf: von Lichtenberg, von Eltz-Kempenich, von Limpurg, von Welz, von Rechteren, vo Loewenstein-Virneburg, von Gravenitz.
- Lindheim: Hesse-Darmstadt, von Oeynhausen, von Rosenbach, von Schlitz, von Schrantenbach (1723-83).
- Mansbach: von Mansbach
- Leonrod in Dietenhofen
- Lichtenstein: Archbishopric of Treviri, von Nassau Usingen, von Rotenhan, von Lichtenstein
- Mommenheim: von Bechtolsheim, von Mundolsheim, von Dalberg-Hessloch, von Dienheim, von Ebersberg, von Greiffenklau, 1/8 Koeth von Manscheid (-1788), von Wallbrunn, von Hallberg, 1/7 von Langenwerth.
- Montfort im Pfalz
- Nieder Saulheim: Electorate of the Palatinate, von Walbrunn, von Langenwerth, von Hundt, von Horneck, von Dienheim, von Haxthausen, 1/2 von Vorster, von Mauchenheim.
- Normannstein bei Treffurt: Electorate of Saxony, Hesse-Kassel, Archbishopric of Mainz.
- Ostheim-Lichtenberg (vor der Rhön).
- Partenheim: von Wambold-Umstadt, von Partenheim, von Wallbrun-Partenheim
- Reipoltskirchen: von Hillesheim, von Manderscheid, von Loewenhaupt (1754-1763).
- Reifenberg
- Roes in Cochen
- Romsthal
- Saffenburg
- Schoernsheim
- Schoernstein
- Schauenburg im Schwarzwald
- Schweinberg
- Schottenstein
- Seelbach
- Steinbach
- Treffurt
- Uettingen
- Weikersheim
- Wald Erbach
- Wehrda
- Windeck bei Buehl

== Literature ==
- Friedrich Karl Alsdorf: Untersuchungen zur Rechtsgestalt und Teilung deutscher Ganerbenburgen. Lang, Frankfurt am Main, 1980, ISBN 3820464085 (Rechtshistorische Reihe. Vol. 9).
- Christoph Bachmann: Ganerbenburgen. In: Horst Wolfgang Böhme: Burgen in Mitteleuropa. Ein Handbuch. Vol. 2. Theiss, Stuttgart, 1999, ISBN 3-8062-1355-0, pp. 39–41.
- Johannes Hoops: Reallexikon der germanischen Altertumskunde. Band 11, 2. Auflage. Walter de Gruyter, Berlin, 1998, ISBN 3-11-015832-9, p. 85 (online)
- Helmut Naumann: Das Rechtswort Ganerbe. In: Mitteilungen des Historischen Vereins der Pfalz. No. 71, 1974, ISSN 0073-2680, pp. 59–153.
- Werner Ogris: Ganerben. In: Handwörterbuch zur deutschen Rechtsgeschichte (HRG). Vol. 1, Lfg. 8, 2nd edn. Schmidt, Berlin, 2008, ISBN 978-3-503-07912-4, Sp. 1928–1930.
- Francis Rapp. Zur Geschichte der Burgen im Elsaß mit besonderer Berücksichtigung der Ganerbschaften und der Burgfrieden. In: Hans Patzke (ed.): Die Burgen im deutschen Sprachraum. Ihre rechts- und verfassungsgeschichtliche Bedeutung. Vol. 2. Thorbecke, Sigmaringen 1974, pp. 229–248.
- Robert Schneider (ed.): Neue kritische Jahrbücher für deutsche Rechtswissenschaft. Jg. 5, No. 9, Tauchnitz, Leipzig, 1846, pp. 326–327 (online)
- Karl-Friedrich Krieger: Ganerben, Ganerbschaft: In: Lexikon des Mittelalters. Band 4, 2. Auflage. dtv, Munich, 2003, ISBN 978-3-423-59057-0, Sp. 1105.
