= Salzburg castle =

Salzburg castle may refer to:

- Salzburg Castle, a large castle in Franconia, Germany
- Hohensalzburg Fortress, a fortress in Salzburg, Austria
