= Sabine Kehm =

German sports agent

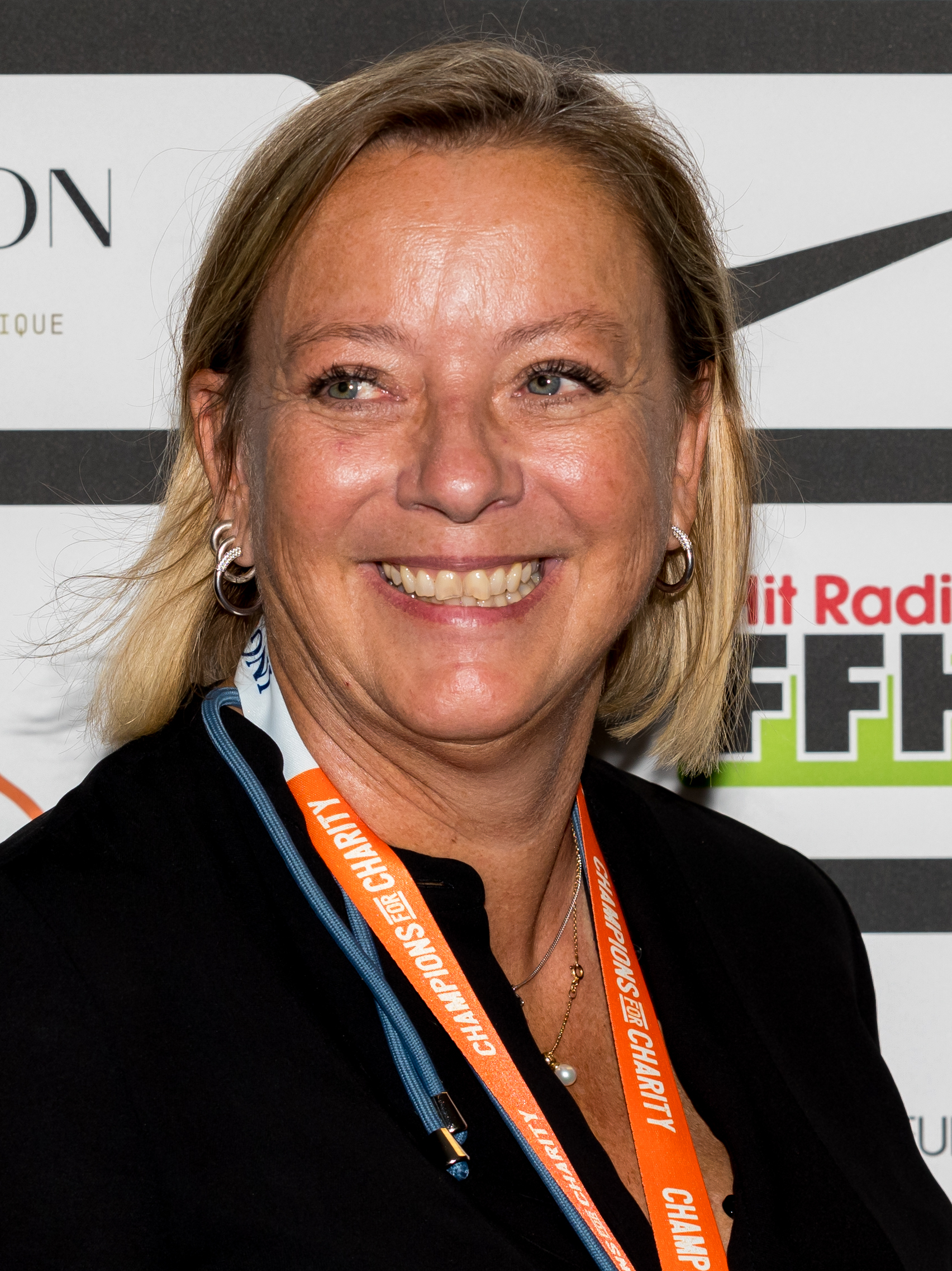
- Kehm in 2022
- Born: December 3, 1964 (age 61)
- Citizenship: German

Sabine Kehm (born 3 December 1964) is a German journalist and the manager of former racing driver Michael Schumacher and his son Mick Schumacher.

== Career ==
Sabine Kehm grew up in Bad Neustadt an der Saale. She studied sports and sports journalism at the German Sport University Cologne, graduated as a sports teacher and then completed an apprenticeship at the Axel Springer School of Journalism in Berlin. She first worked in the sports department of the daily newspaper Die Welt and after working for the magazine Sports, she took on a position as a sports editor at the Süddeutsche Zeitung.

In 1999, Kehm received a phone call from Michael Schumacher's manager at the time, Willi Weber; he was looking for a press officer and media consultant for the world champion. After Schumacher's retirement from Formula One in 2006, she worked as head of communications for Ferrari for Central and Eastern Europe. There she also coordinated the media appointments of Schumacher, who was working as a consultant for Ferrari at the time.

In 2010, she took over the management from Michael Schumacher and continues to look after the Schumacher family after Schumacher's skiing accident in December 2013. She also manages Schumacher's son Mick, who also drove in the Formula One World Championship until 2022.
