= Tours de Merle =

Medieval castle in France

Coordinates: 45°3′51″N 2°4′29″E

The Tours de Merle ('Towers of Merle') are the ruins of a castle in the commune of Saint-Geniez-ô-Merle, in the Corrèze département of France. A feudal fortress from the twelfth and fifteenth centuries, which was subject of a classification as a historic monument since July 30, 1927.

In the fourteenth century, Merle included seven castles, two chapels and village, owned by seven noblemen from Merles.

During the Hundred Years' War, the English took one of the towers and a castle in 1371.

In 1574 the Calvinists took the citadel, where they established a garrison, they were driven out two years later by the co-lords. But the fortress was abandoned by those who preferred to live in places that were more pleasant and certainly more accessible.

== See also ==
- List of castles in France
