= Brendlorenzen =

- Stadtteil of Bad Neustadt an der Saale
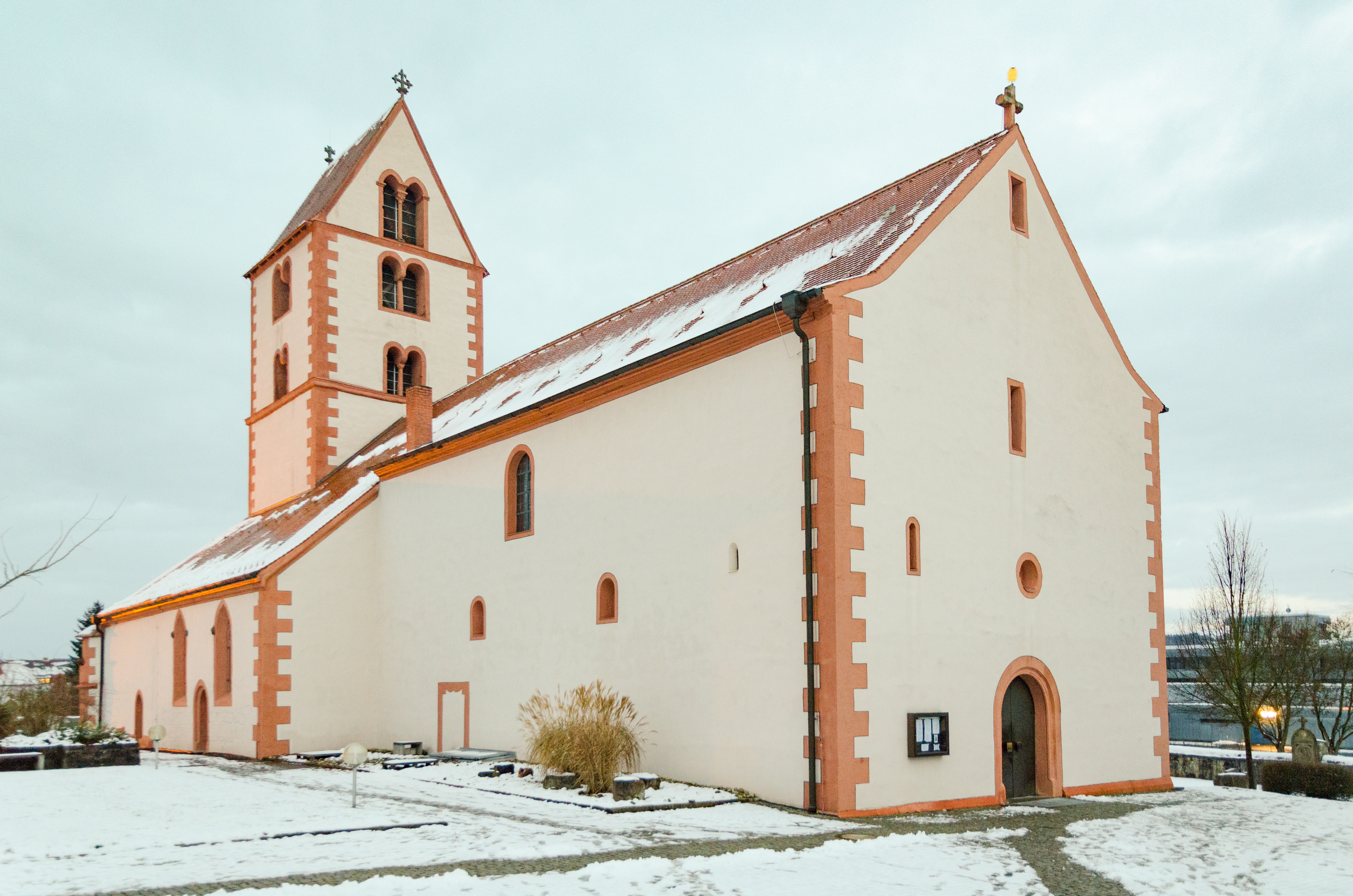
- Church of Saint John the Baptist

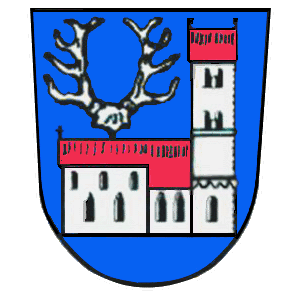
- Coat of arms
- Interactive map of Brendlorenzen
- Location within Germany Location within Bavaria
- Coordinates: 50°19′56″N 10°11′39″E
- Country: Germany
- State: Bavaria
- Admin. region: Lower Franconia
- District: Rhön-Grabfeld
- Town: Bad Neustadt an der Saale

Population
  - Total: 4,277
- Time zone: UTC+01:00 (CET)
  - Summer (DST): UTC+02:00 (CEST)
- Postal codes: 97616
- Vehicle registration: NES

Brendlorenzen is a district of the town of Bad Neustadt an der Saale in the Lower Franconia (Unterfranken) region of Bavaria, Germany. It lies northwest of the historic town centre on the opposite bank of the Brend stream and was incorporated into Bad Neustadt in 1978. As of the latest municipal figures, Brendlorenzen has a population of 4,277.

== History ==
The existence of the community on the Brend was first documented in 742 AD, with the church of Saint Martin coming under the jurisdiction of the newly founded diocese of Würzburg. Original texts identify the parish church in Brendlorenzen and the round church in the Marienberg Fortress in Würzburg as the oldest of the diocese. The parish church was probably consecrated by Saint Willibrord in 706 AD.

The building of the church is certainly connected to the construction of the royal estates of Charlemagne in the neighboring village of Salz, at the foot of the Rhön Mountains. Its use at the time of the construction as a baptistry was probably furthermore reason for reassigning patronage from the original Saint Martin to John the Baptist, with whom the church is now associated.

Brendlorenzen hosted a settled area, however, long before this first documented mention. While laying the foundations for new construction in 2001, traces of a settlement from the La Tène culture from the Iron Age were uncovered, including cellar-like dug-outs, garbage dumps and the remnants of six pottery kilns.

On the first of January, 1972, the formerly independent community of Lebenhan was annexed by Brendlorenzen. Then on the first of January, 1978, both were incorporated into the City of Bad Neustadt an der Saale.

== Education ==
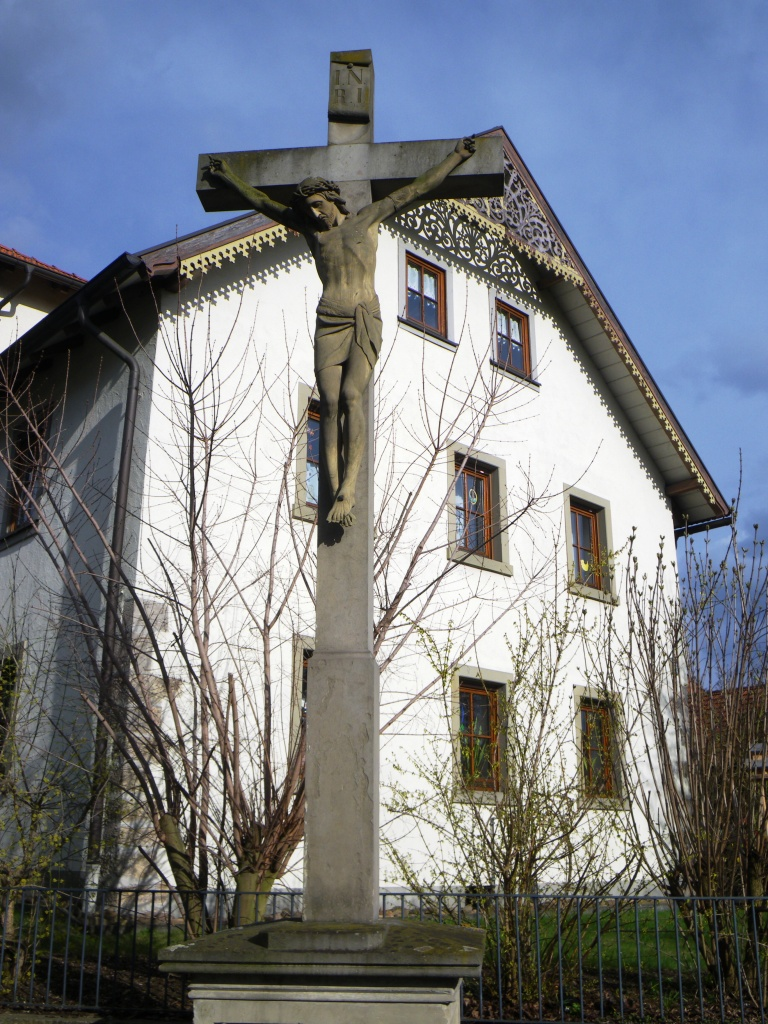
Crucifix along Main Street

For preschool education there are two Catholic kindergartens, St. Joseph and St. Martin, as well as a municipal nursery school. The village has its own elementary educational facility, which is also attended by children from the nearby village Lebenhan.

== Clubs and associations ==
The TSV (Turn- und Sportverein, gymnastics and sports club) Brendlorenzen is the biggest sports club in the district of Rhön-Grabfeld, presently with around 1400 members. It consists of eight different departments today: soccer, track and field, table tennis, cycling, volleyball, triathlon, basketball and badminton.

The cycling department is regionally renowned for the administration of the annual Rhöner Kuppenritt, a meet on the trails through the Rhön Mountains. This event offers numerous different bike routes (ranging from 30 to 220 kilometers in length), both for leisure and for training purposes and for cyclists of all abilities. The "Franconian Freaks", a travel and leisure club, are also located in the village.

== Events ==
During the first weekend of August, close to the namesake’s Saint Day (10 August), the village celebrates the Laurentiusfest (St. Lawrence’s Party) on the banks of the river Brend with local live music and beer.
