= Salzburg Castle =

- Burg Salzburg
- Bad Neustadt an der Saale
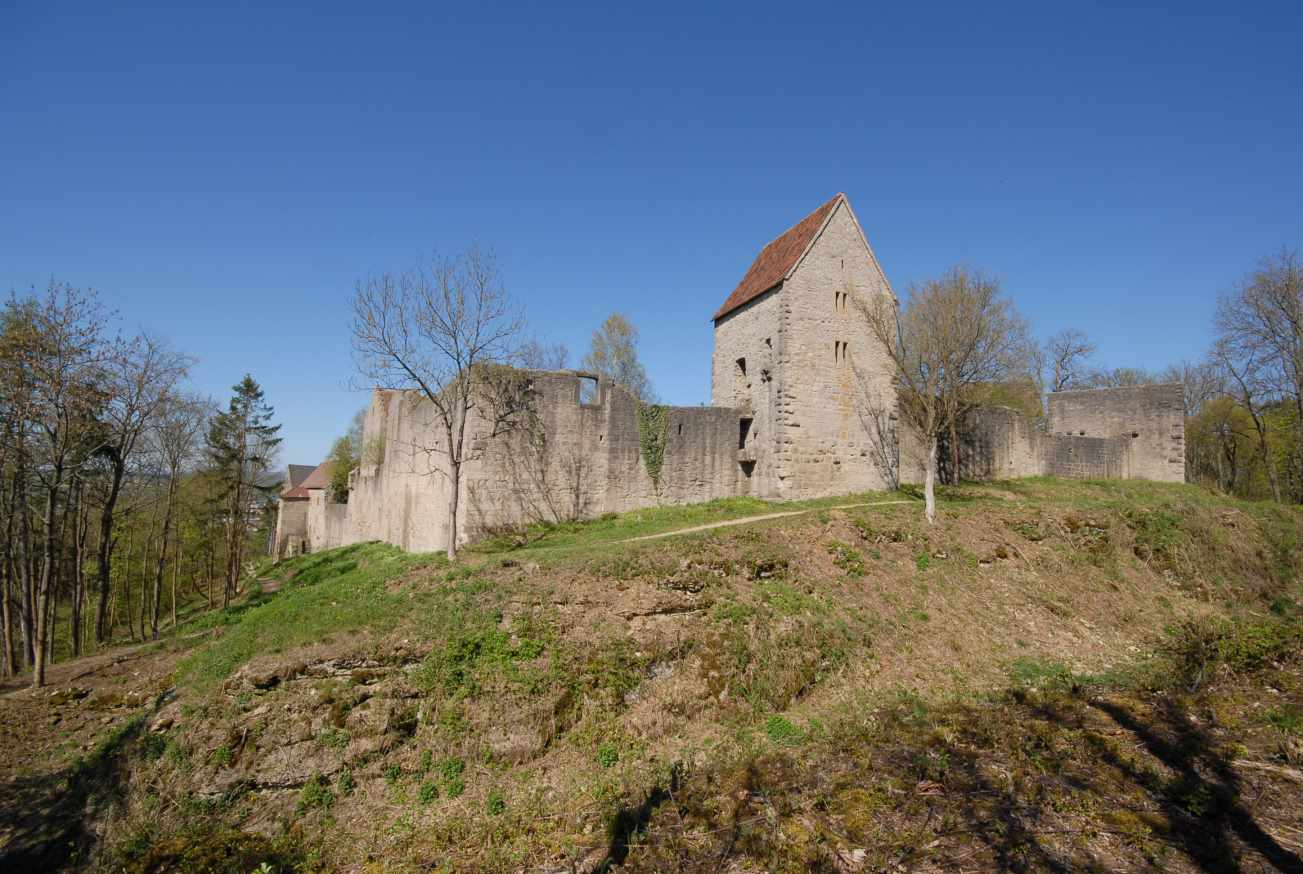
- The Salzburg – northeast side

Site information
- Type: hill castle, spur castle
- Code: DE-BY
- Condition: Wholly or mainly preserved

Location
- Coordinates: 50°19′14″N 10°13′48″E
- Height: 300 m above sea level (NN)

Site history
- Built: around 1150
- Materials: chalk, sandstone

Garrison information
- Occupants: ministeriales

Salzburg Castle (German: Burg Salzburg) stands on the edge of a plateau above the town of Bad Neustadt an der Saale in Lower Franconia in southern Germany. The large Ganerbenburg (jointly inherited castle) is still partly occupied today and not all areas are accessible to the public.

== Location ==
The castle was built about a kilometre east of Bad Neustadt on the western end of the plateau above Neuhaus and is separated from the land in front of it by a roughly 160-metre-long neck ditch. Until the 19th century the whole hillside was cleared and was used as early as the High Middle Ages for viticulture. The present, thickly wooded ridge on which the castle stands is also the site of the extensive Franconian Clinic (Rhön-Klinikum AG), which dominates the landscape.

== History ==
=== Early Middle Ages ===
By the Carolingian era, the Salzgau around Neustadt was already very important. Eginhard says that Charlemagne went in his palace at Saltz in 790. An imperial palace (Pfalz) was even built here; it was given to the Bishopric of Wurzburg in 1000 A.D. by Emperor Otto III. This palace was probably on the site of the present village of Salz or in its immediate vicinity. A castle was built on the nearby Veitsberg hill, probably in Ottonian times during the period of the Hungarian invasions, to protect the local populace. A fortified enclosure of unknown date may have been located on the site of the present castle of Salzburg. These fortifications, too, may have been upgraded in the first half of the 10th century into a refuge castle in the face of attacks by the Magyars.

The first record of the Salzburg occurs in a copy of a deed by Emperor Louis the Pious dated around 1160. The original document is missing and could have been inadvertently and mistakenly amended by its scribe, Friar Eberhard of Fulda Abbey, to show the place of publication (Actum-Zeile or Ausstellungsort) as the Salzburg or Salzberg: "Act(um) in Salzb. Curia regia".

The copy of this early medieval document clearly suggests that the royal palace of Salz was actually located on the castle hill and older research invariably locates this royal court on the site of the more recent castle. Later on, the Veitsberg near Salz was generally reckoned to be the location of the palace while, today, historians favour the village of Salz or its immediate surroundings as the likely site. Friar Eberhard may have only known of the new site of the castle and replaced the village name of Salz by the abbreviation "Salzb." (Salzburg) throughout his transcript.

=== High and Late Middle Ages ===
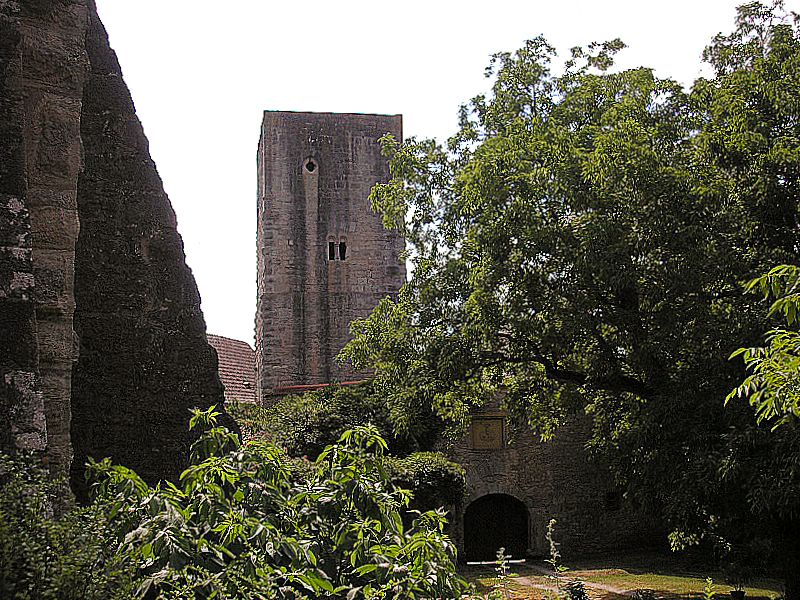
The bergfried of the "Voitscher Ansitz" in the south of the site

The walled stone castle replaced an older palisaded ditch hewn from the limestone rock. This discovery was only made in 1984 during an official excavation of the foundations. This originally wooden, protective rampart is about a metre behind the stone wall and was probably a provisional enhancement to protect the site. The oldest curtain wall was obviously not fully developed. The elements of the fortified site datable to the first phase of construction are up to four metres high, but there are long stretches where only the foundation seems to have been laid. Whether the Bishop of Würzburg intended to form a major administrative centre or even a fortified village, here, remains speculative.

== Gallery ==
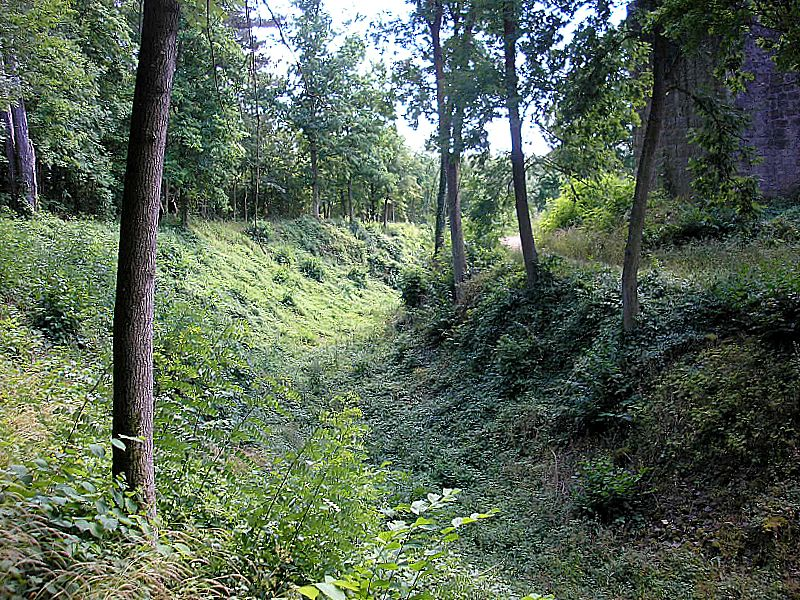
View of neck ditch

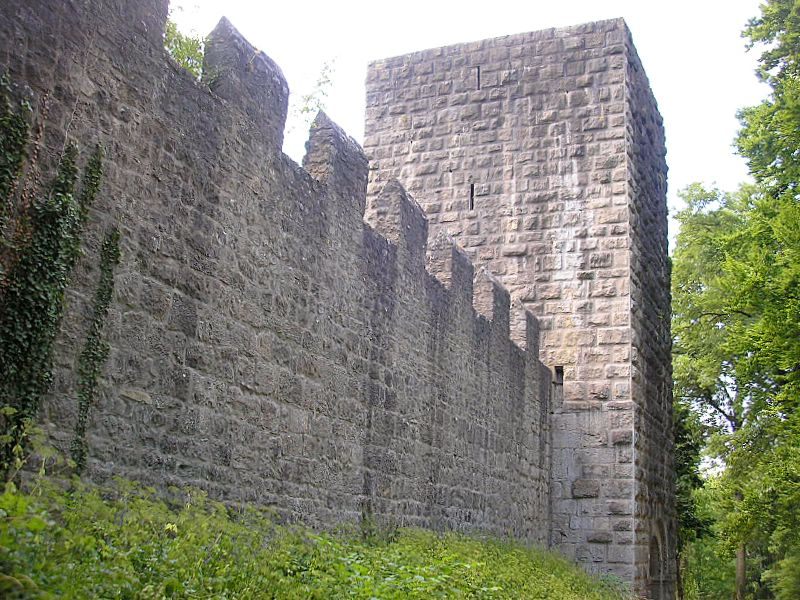
The gate tower and curtain wall

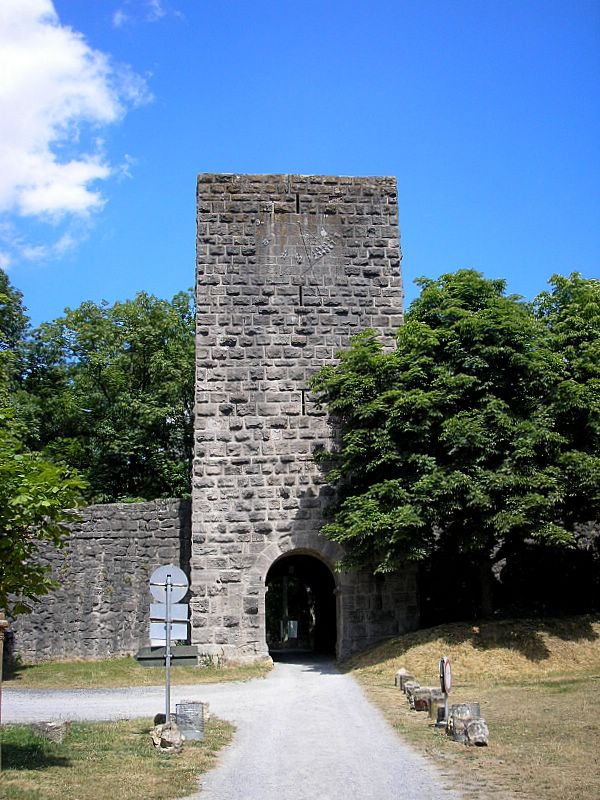
The gate bergfried seen from the castle court

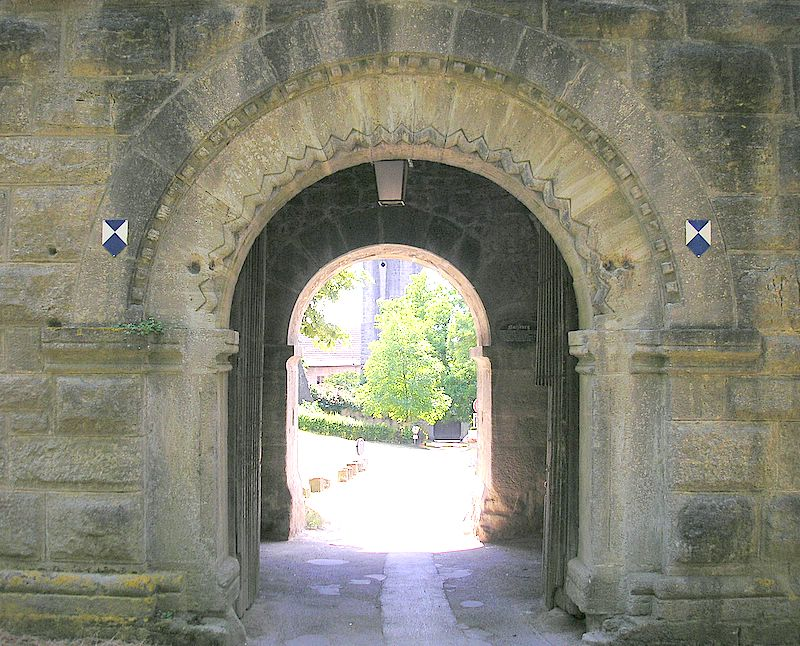
The Romanesque main gate

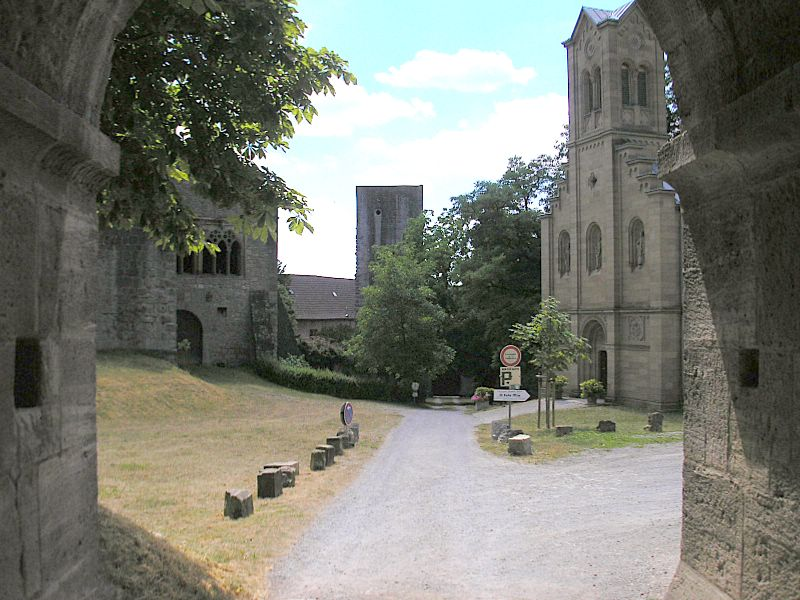
View through the main gate into the castle court. Right: the neo-Romanesque castle chapel

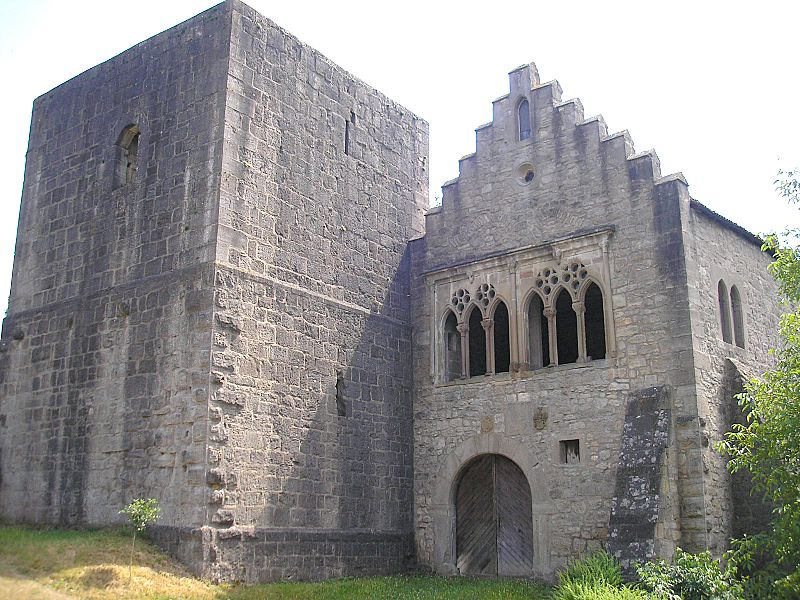
The Münz and central bergfried

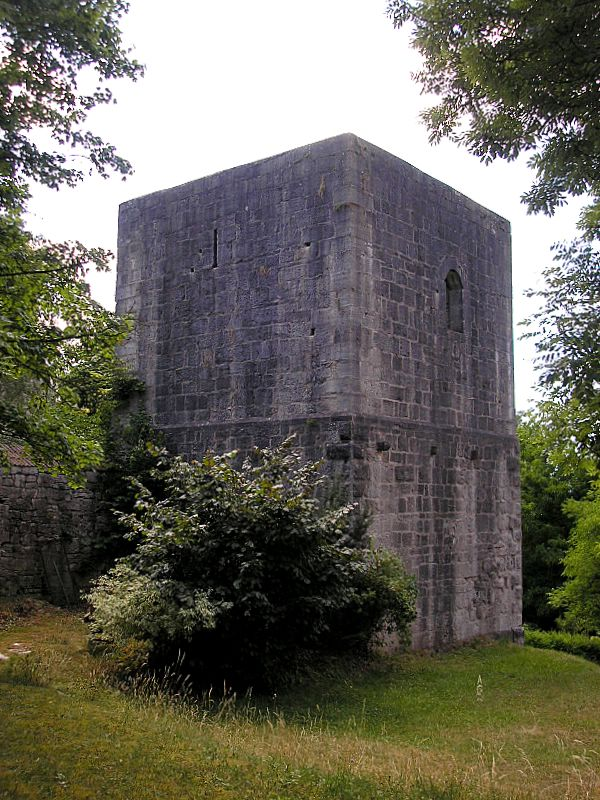
The central bergfried from the east

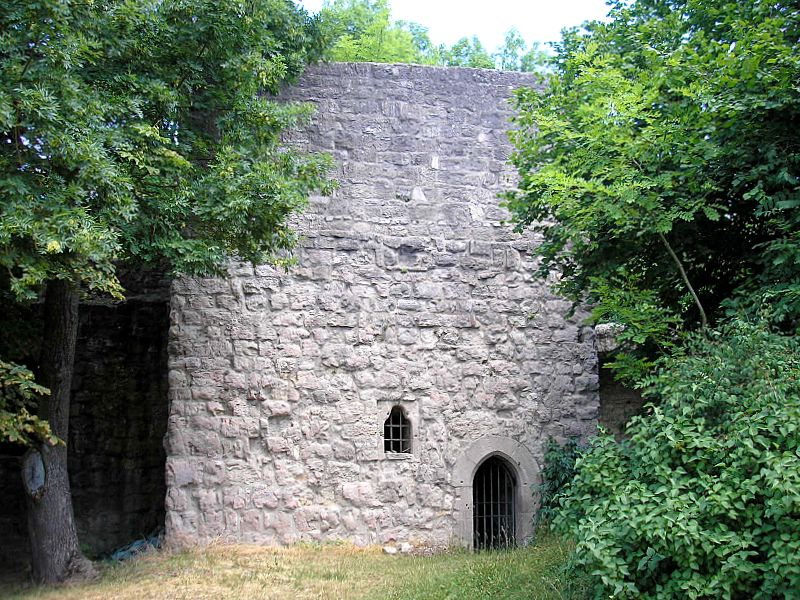
The watchtower (interior)

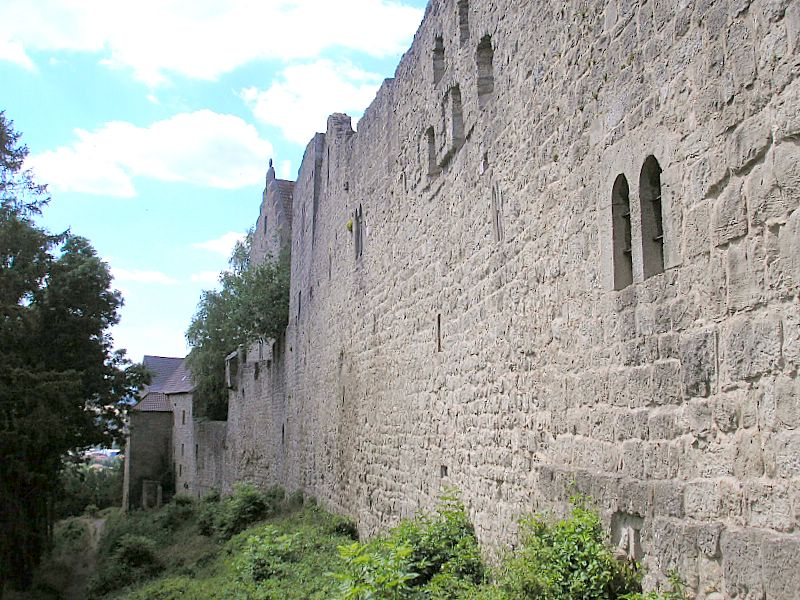
The south side of the site. View looking west

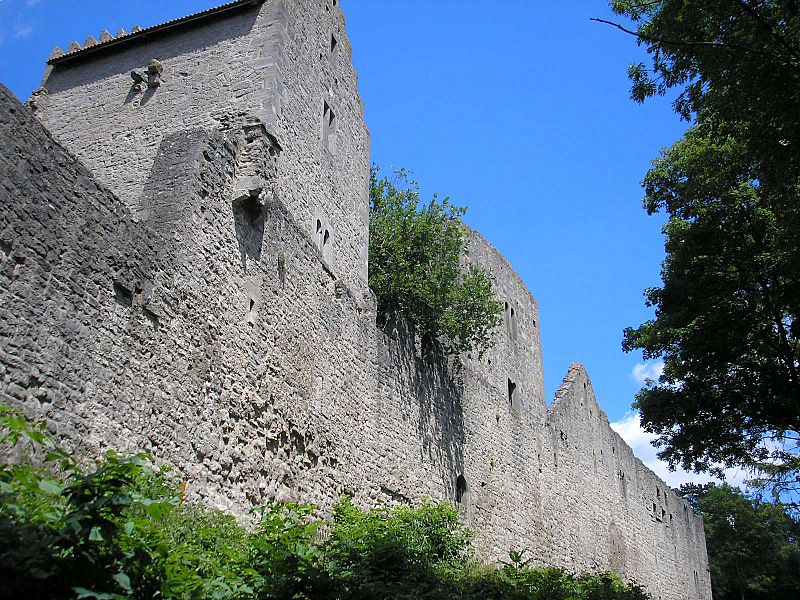
Counterview looking east

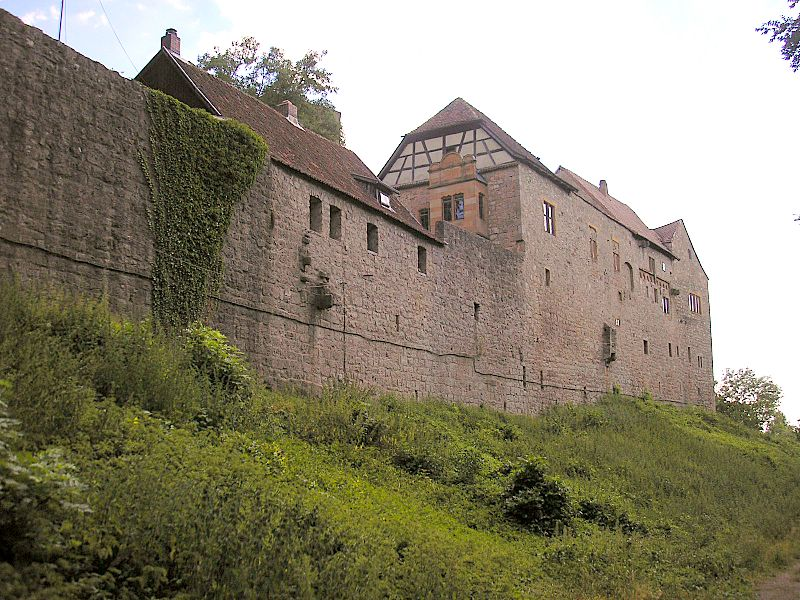
The west side and the Voitschen Ansitz

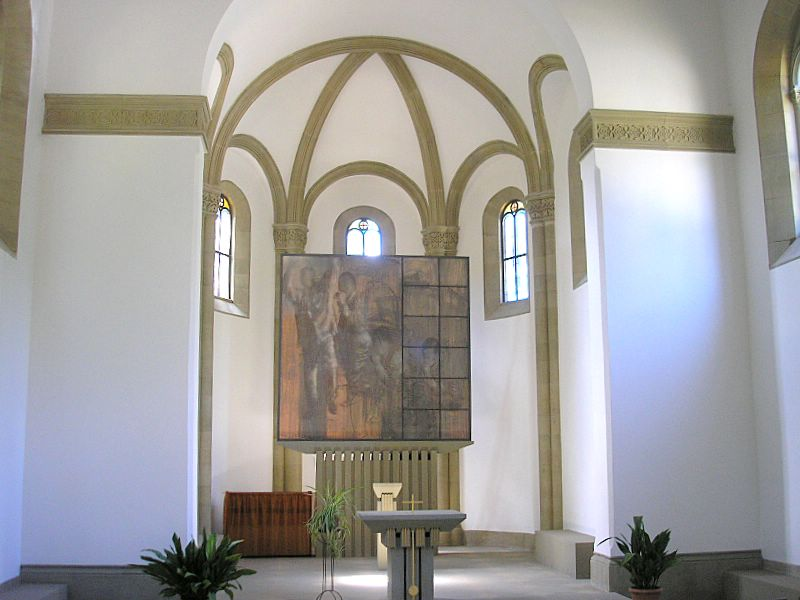
View inside chapel of St. Boniface

== See also ==
- List of castles in Bavaria

== Literature ==
- Heinz Gauly: The Bonifatius-Kapelle auf der Salzburg. Salz, self-publication, 2006.
- Leonhard Hegewald: Neustadt an der Saale, Der Kaiserpfalz auf dem Schlossberg und Bad Neuhaus mit seinen Quellen – ill. Führer für Fremde und Einheimische. Neustadt a.d. Saale, 1880.
- The Kunstdenkmäler von Bayern, III, 22, Bezirksamt Neustadt a. pp., pp. 166–193. Munich, 1922 (Nachdruck Munich, 1983), ISBN 3-486-50476-2.
- Klaus Leidorf, Peter Ettel: Burgen in Bayern – 7000 Jahre Burgengeschichte im Luftbild. Stuttgart, 1999, ISBN 3-8062-1364-X.
- Programm für The Salzburgfest, The eilfte Säcularfeier The Stiftung fränkischer, thüringischer und hessischer Bisthümer through den heiligen Bonifacius auf d. Salzburg bei Neustadt an d. Saale, begangen d. 12. Juli 1841. Würzburg, 1841.
- Georg Joseph Saffenreuter: Der eilfte Säcularfeier auf der Salzburg bei Neustadt an der Saale am 12. Juli 1841. Würzburg, 1841.
- Salisburg, der eilfte Säcularfeier der Weihe der ersten Bischöfe von Würzburg, Eichstädt, Erfurt und Buriburg durch den heiligen Bonifacius im Jahr 741 und die Grundsteinlegung zum Wiederaufbau die Bonifacius-Kapelle …. Würzburg 1841.
- Otto Schnell: Salzburg-Führer – Geschichte u. Beschreibung d. alten Kaiserpfalz Salzburg a.d. fränk. Saale. Würzburg 1900.
- August Voit von Salzburg: The uralte Kaiserburg Salzburg bei Neustadt an The Saale. Bayreuth 1832, (reprint of the 2nd edn. 1833: Bad Königshofen, 1989)
- Heinrich Wagner, Joachim Zeune (eds.): Das Salzburgbuch. Bad Neustadt, 2008, ISBN 978-3-939959-04-5.
- Joachim Zeune: Burg Salzburg – Führer durch die Salzburg. Bad Neustadt, 1994.
