= Brend =

River in Germany

- Bridge over the Brend in Bischofsheim

Location
- Country: Germany
- State: Bavaria

Physical characteristics
- Mouth
  - location: Franconian Saale
  - coordinates: 50°19′23″N 10°13′21″E
- Length: 29.7 km (18.5 mi)

Basin features
- Progression: Franconian Saale→ Main→ Rhine→ North Sea

The river Brend (German pronunciation: [ˈbʁɛnt]) is a right-bank tributary of the Franconian Saale, in Lower Franconia, Bavaria, Germany. It is situated in the district Rhön-Grabfeld.

Its source is in Oberweißenbrunn, it then flows through Bischofsheim, Unterweißenbrunn, Wegfurt (all parts of the town Bischofsheim), Schönau and Brendlorenzen before entering the Franconian Saale after 30 kilometres in Bad Neustadt.

== See also ==
- List of rivers of Bavaria
