= Grumbach Feud =

The “Grumbach Feud” (German: Grumbachsche Händel), in 1567, was a rather bizarre episode in the history of the Ernestine side of the House of Wettin, which led to life imprisonment for Elector John Frederick II “the Middle”, the Duke of Saxe-Coburg-Eisenach.

== History ==
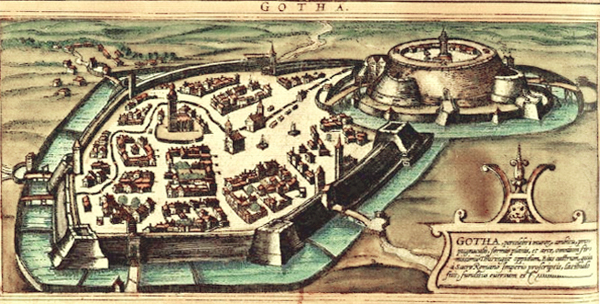
The city of Gotha with the Grimmenstein Castle (woodcut from 1572)

Because of the Treaty of Leipzig in 1485, the House of Wettin was divided into two sides, the Ernestine line and the Albertine line (Leipziger Teilung or “Leipziger Division”). At first, the Electorate of Saxony remained in the older of the two lines, the Ernestine. However, in 1547, Elector John Frederick I “the Magnanimous” lost the Battle of Mühlberg and therefore the Schmalkaldic War against the Holy Roman Emperor, Charles V, and had to agree to the Wittenberger Capitulation, which erased his rank of Elector and transferred the Electorate, including Wittenberg, to the Albertine side. When John Frederick “the Magnanimous” died in 1554, he was succeeded by his three sons, John Frederick II “the Middle”, John William and John Frederick III, “the Younger”. They tried to rule together but, in 1565, after the death of John Frederick III, the surviving elder brothers agreed to the division of their lands. John Frederick II got Coburg and Eisenach while Weimar went to John William.

John Frederick II took up his residence in Gotha. He continued to pursue his late father’s claims on the Electorate for himself. His friend, a Ritter named Wilhelm von Grumbach, took it up for him, as the Duke was still under the Imperial ban for the breach of the peace. Grumbach encouraged the Duke with a daring plan, which involved an uprising of the German knights, the assistance from King Frederick II of Denmark, and the use of magic charms. For good measure, the Engelseher (“Angel Seer”) Hans Tausendschön claimed that an angel had appeared to him and predicted the resurrection and ascendance of the Ernestine family. This, Grumbach promised that he would achieve without a military confrontation, thus giving the Ernestines the electoral dignity again.

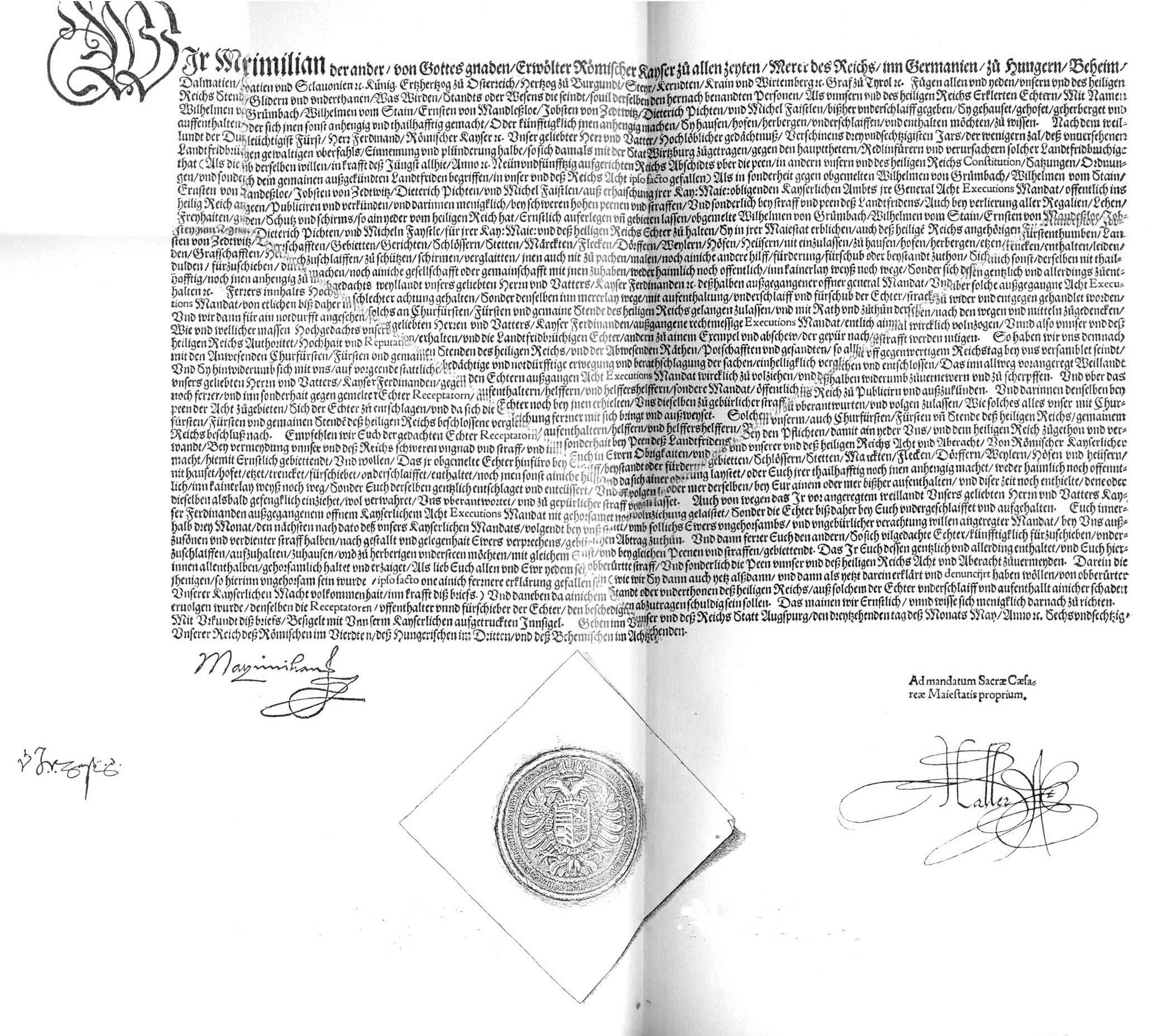
Imperial ban signed on 13 May 1566 by Emperor Maximilian II against Duke John Frederick II

But in 1563 the Ritter raised an army and attacked Würzburg, which he seized and plundered. He was consequently placed under the Imperial ban but John Frederick II refused to obey the order of Emperor Maximilian II to turn him over to the Imperial authorities. Maximilian then postponed the case to the next Reichstag, to be held in 1566 in Augsburg, giving Grumbach the time to plot the assassination of his patron’s cousin and rival, Augustus, Elector of Saxony, from the Albertine side. Proclamations were issued to call for assistance and alliances inside and outside the Holy Roman Empire were made. But, in March 1566, at the Augsburg Diet, the Lutheran estates of the former Schmalkaldic League and even John Frederick’s own brother, John William, sided with Maximilian. On 13 May 1566, the Reichsexekution was imposed, with the signature of the Emperor, upon John Frederick. Elector Augustus of Saxony was entrusted to carry it out. This he did, by laying siege to the city of Gotha and the Grimmenstein Castle. He did not get any help from his allies. But he still managed to incite a mutiny among the defenders and both the city and the castle fell.

Ultimately John Frederick II had to surrender and enter Imperial captivity in Austria, where he died 29 years later. Grumbach was executed with dismemberment on 18 April 1567 in the marketplace of Gotha. Thereafter, Elector Augustus had his mint in Dresden to make a commemorative taler (Gedenktaler) with the Gotha imprint, with an ostentatiously large obverse and the Latin inscription:

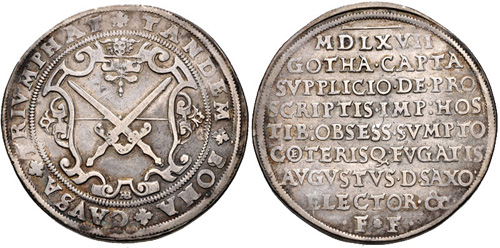
Elector Augustus, 1567 guldengroschen (Taler), with the Gotha imprint

„Endlich siegt die gute Sache“ und der Inschrift auf der Rückseite: „Als im Jahre 1567 die Stadt Gotha eingenommen, die Strafe an den geächteten belagerten Reichsfeinden vollzogen und die übrigen in die Flucht geschlagen worden, ließ August, Herzog zu Sachsen und Kurfürst, (diese Münze) machen.“
[“Finally the good things triumph” and the inscription on the back side: “When the city of Gotha is taken in 1567, carried out in punishment to the besieged Imperial enemies, and the rest were put to flight, Augustus, Duke of Saxony and Elector, allows (this coin to be) made.”]

— Translation by Walter Haupt

== Aftermath ==
The lands of John Frederick “the Middle” were first handed over to his brother John William for the management. In 1572, the two sons of John Frederick II, John Casimir (1564–1633) and John Ernest (1566–1638) were restored to the possessions of their father. But they still had to share them with their uncle John William, according to the terms of the Erfurter Division (Erfurter Teilung) Treaty. This was the first of the several subdivisions of the properties of the Ernestines in Thuringia, through which the Thuringian mini-states, the Ernestine duchies, eventually emerged.

The Grumbach Feud is regarded as the last breach of the Ewiger Landfriede.

== Bibliography ==
- (in German) Friedrich Ortloff: Die Geschichte der Grumbachschen Händel [The History of the Grumbach Feud], 4 Volumes (Jena: Verlag Frommann, 1869 and 1870)
- (in German) Johannes Voigt, “Wilhelm von Grumbach und seine Händel [William von Grumbach and his Feud]”, in: Friedrich von Raumer, ed., Historisches Taschenbuch: Neue Folge, Achter Jahrgang [Historical Paperback: New Series, 8th Volume] (Leipzig: F. A. Brockhaus, 1847), pages 77-254
- (in German) Franz Xaver von Wegele, “Wilhelm von Grumbach”, in: Heinrich von Sybel, ed., Historische Zeitschrift [Historical Magazine, the periodical of the Königlich Bayerischen Akademie der Wissenschaften (Royal Bavaria Academy of Knowledge)], Zweiter Band [Volume 2] (Munich: J[ohann]. G[eorg]. Cotta’schen Buchhandlung, 1859), pages 408–422
- This article incorporates the text from a publication in the public domain: “Grumbach, Wilhelm von”, in: Hugh Chisholm, ed., Encyclopædia Britannica, 11th Edition, Volume XII: Gichtel to Harmonium (Cambridge: Cambridge University Press, 1910), page 639
