= Windeck Castle (Bühl) =

- Burg Windeck or Burg Alt-Windeck
- Bühl-Kappelwindeck
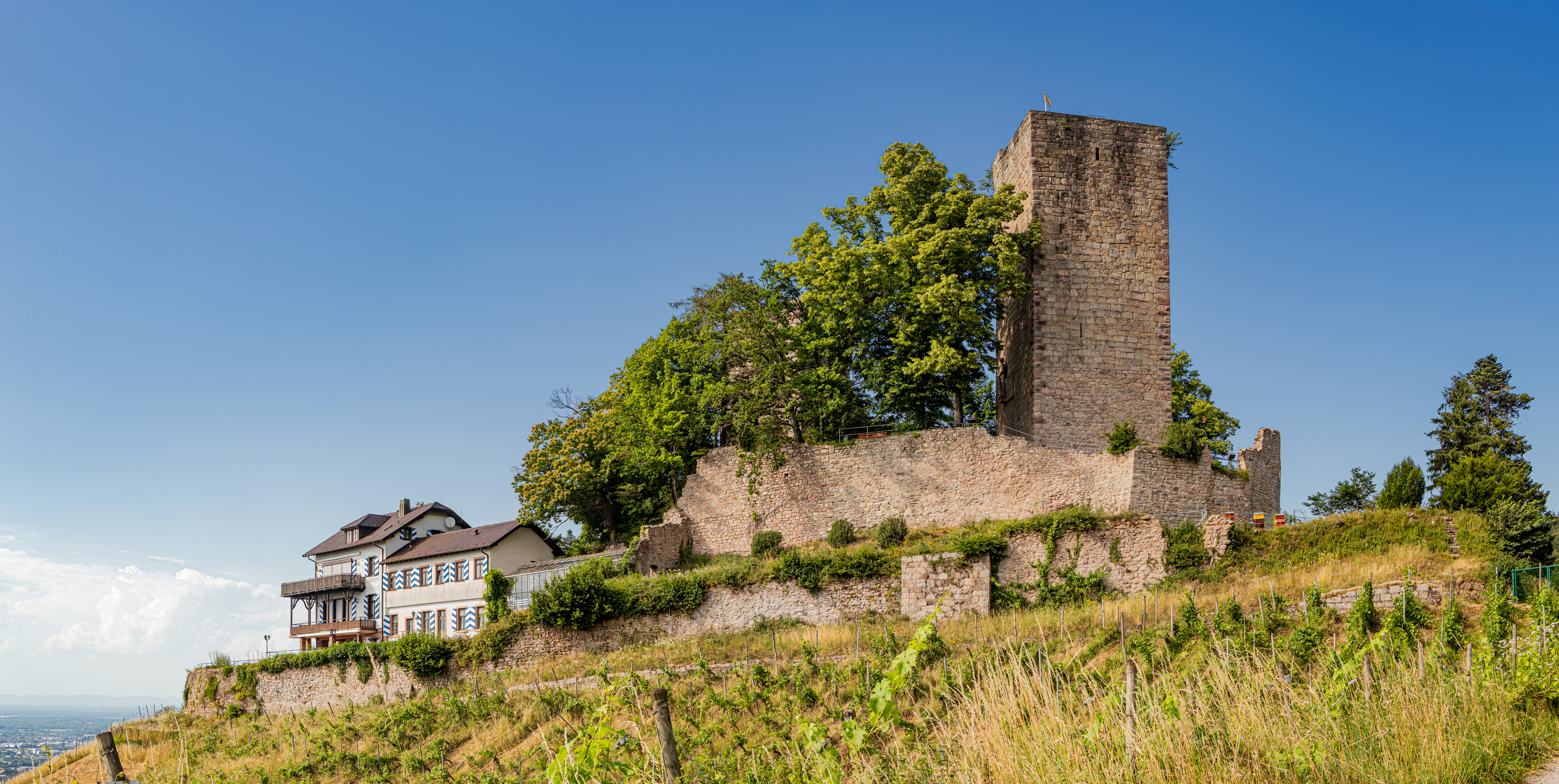
- Windeck Castle near Bühl

Site information
- Type: hill castle, spur castle
- Code: DE-BW
- Condition: ruin

Location
- Coordinates: 48°40′21″N 8°09′28″E
- Height: 378 m above sea level (NN)

Site history
- Built: around 1200

Garrison information
- Occupants: allodial lords

Windeck Castle (German: Burg Windeck), also Old Windeck Castle (Burg Alt-Windeck), is a ruined Black Forest spur castle which stands on a 378-metre-high spur in the Bühl district of Kappelwindeck, in the county of Rastatt in the German state of Baden-Württemberg.

== History ==
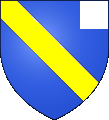
Windeck (Ortenau)

The castle was built around 1200 by the lords of Windeck. The family, probably of Franconian origin and based in the Ortenau, owned wealthy allodial estates and held numerous fiefs from various liege lords, such as the empire, the Prince-Bishopric of Straßburg, the counts of Eberstein as well as the Vogtei of Schwarzach Abbey as an Afterlehen of the burgraves of Nuremberg. The first documentary evidence dates to 1212 when a certain Melchior von Windeck comes to light, and, in 1248, the lords of Windeck are mentioned in a document at Schwarzach Abbey as ministeriales of the Bishop of Straßburg. The castle itself, however, is first mentioned in 1335. It became a jointly-managed castle or Ganerbenburg very early on as a result of divisions of inheritance. In the early 13th century the New Windeck Castle (Burg Neu-Windeck) was built by a branch of the family near Lauf within sight of Old Windeck. During the course of the 13th and 14th centuries, the lords of Windeck came into conflict many times with neighbouring territorial lords, the city of Straßburg and the counts of Württemberg in alliance with the Martinsvögel during the so-called Schlegler Wars, during which the castle was besieged, but never captured and so remained largely undamaged. In the late 14th century, however, it was stricken by a devastating fire. Stables and domestic buildings were razed, and the valuable archives, the basis of numerous legal titles, were destroyed. Reinhard von Windeck had the affected buildings rebuilt.

In 1466, the last heir of Old Windeck, Anna, only child of Burkhard von Windeck, married and so the castle went to the family of her husband, Baron Berthold IV of New Windeck. His descendants occupied the castle until the 16th century, but from 1561 it was used as a quarry for other buildings in Bühl, such as the Kappelwindeck Church. Its owner thus moved into the more modern Schlosshof (today a hotel) in Bühl.

The last heir, Jakob von Windeck, was on the return journey of his Junkerfahrt, which had taken him through France, Spain and Italy to Palestine, when he was taken seriously ill and died in Venice in 1592. The fief was returned to the Empire, the remaining allods went in equal portions to his two sisters: Old Windeck to Ursula and New Windeck to Elizabeth.

== Description ==
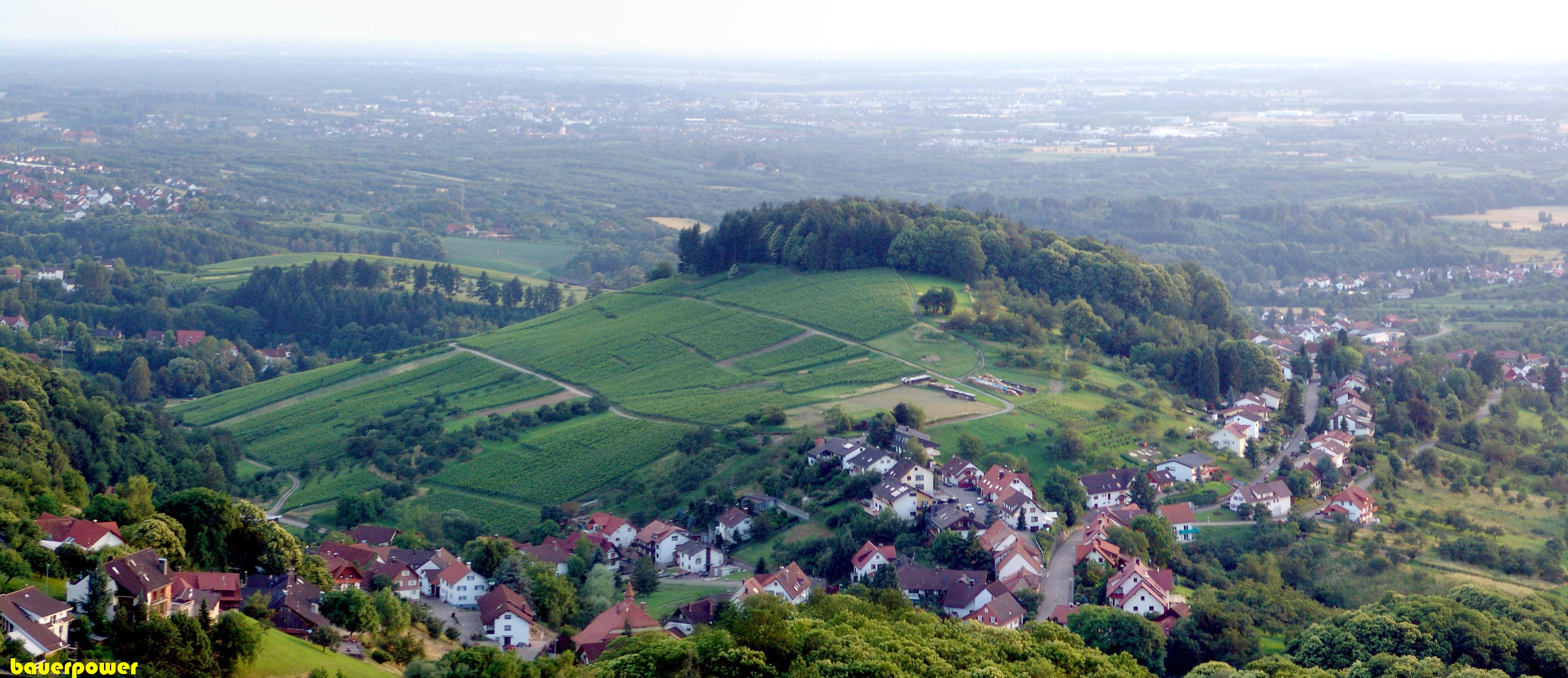
Panorama looking west

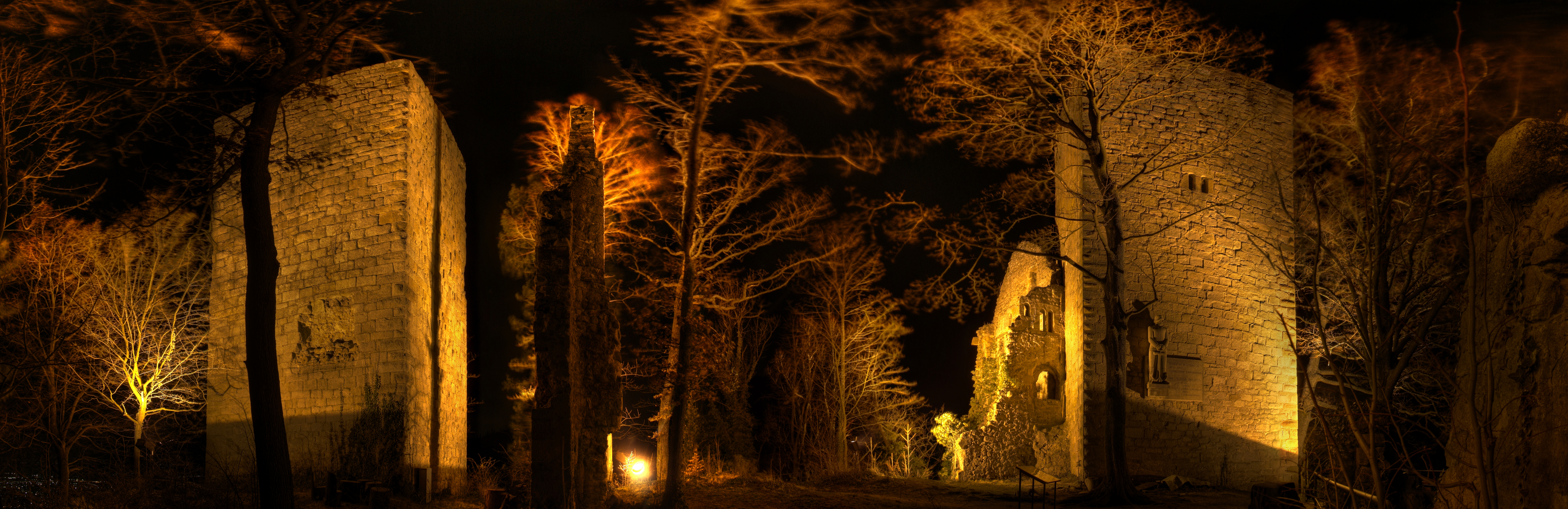
Windeck Castle at night

All that remains of the castle today is a bergfried, a tower and parts of the curtain wall. They may be visited in good weather.

The castle probably consisted of an outer and an inner ward that each had its own bergfried and palas.

The smaller, northern bergfried, with a ground plan measuring 8.5 metres square, guarded the castle gate and the downhill side of the site. The surviving southern bergfried, 27.6 metres high, has a floor area of 9.6 x 9.8 metres. Its lower floor was probably used as a dungeon or store room. In case of war, its thick walls made it a strong refuge for the castle's residents. On the first and second floors of the attached palas were probably reception rooms such as the great hall.

At the foot of the castle ruins are the hotel and restaurant, Burg Windeck, and the Pferdestall snack bar.

== Literature ==
- Ernst Batzer, Alfons Städele (eds.): Burgen und Schlösser um Bühl, Bühl/Baden o.J.
- Ulrich Coenen: Die Baukunst der nördlichen Ortenau. Denkmäler in Bühl, Bühlertal, Ottersweier, Lichtenau, Rheinmünster und Sinzheim. Karlsruhe, 1993.
- Suso Gartner: Die Windecker und ihre Burgen. 2nd edn., Buhl, 1998.
- Suso Gartner, Stefan Uhl: Beiträge zur Geschichte der Windecker und ihrer Burgen. Die Hinterlassenschaft des Wolf von Windeck – Zur Baugeschichte von Alt- und Neuwindeck. Buhl, 2008.
- Karl-Bernhard Knappe: Die Burg Alt-Windeck. In: Hugo Schneider (ed.): Burgen und Schlösser in Mittelbaden. Schriftenreihe: Die Ortenau: Zeitschrift des Historischen Vereins für Mittelbaden, Vol. 64. Verlag des Historischen Vereins für Mittelbaden, Offenburg, 1984, ISSN 0342-1503, pp. 150–160.
- Josef Harbrecht (ed.): Alt-Windeck, Die Geschichte der Windecker und ihrer Burg. Special edition from "Bühler Blauer Hefte" Vols. 5,6,7, Bühl/Baden, 1960.
- Adolf Welte: Die Burgen Alt- & Neu-Windeck. Bonndorf, 1894.
