= Lichtenstein Castle (Lower Franconia) =

- Burg Lichtenstein
- Pfarrweisach-Lichtenstein
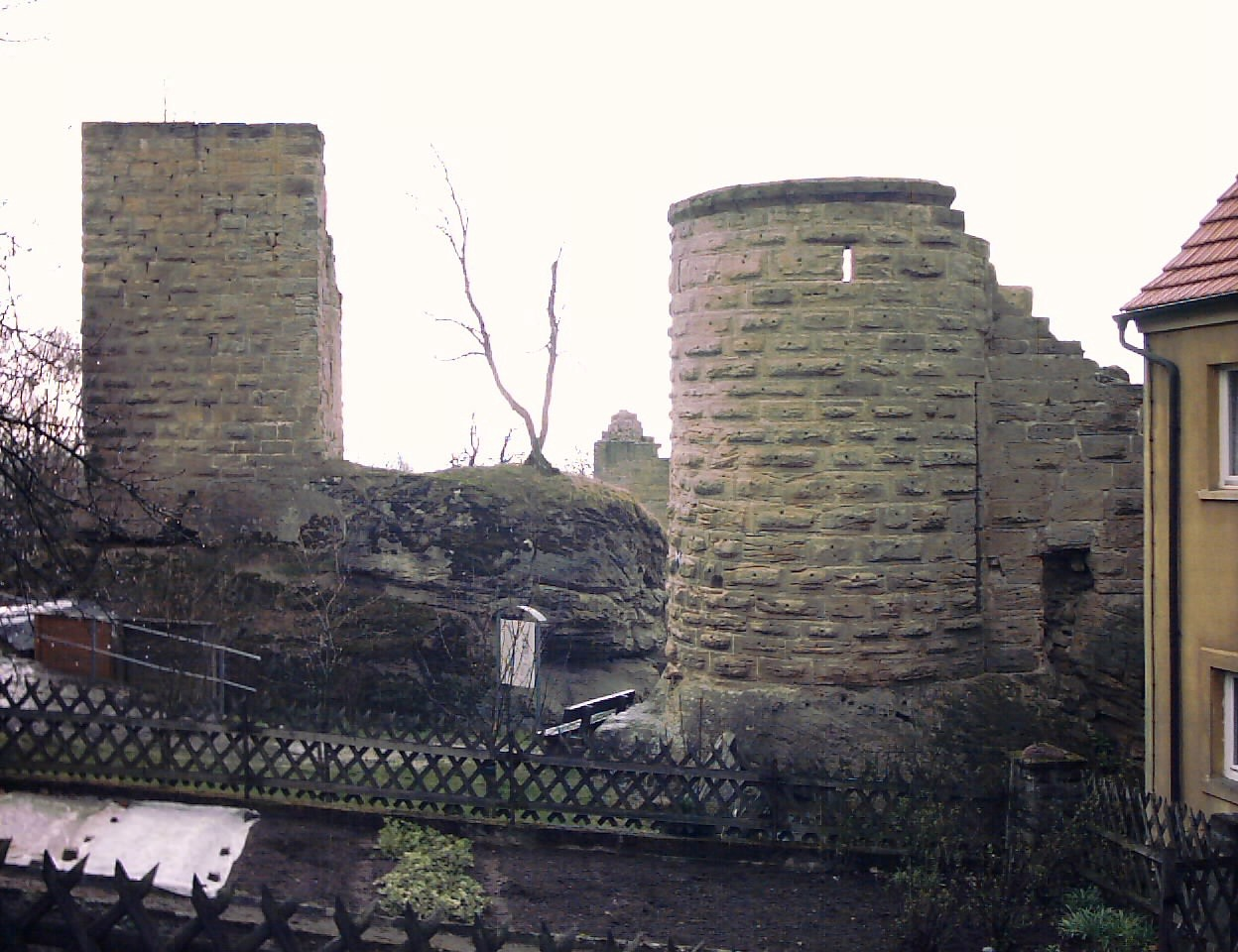
- The ruins of North Castle with its bergfried and the Pfeilscharte tower

Site information
- Type: hill castle
- Code: DE-BY

Location
- Coordinates: 50°08′30″N 10°46′46″E
- Height: 380 m above sea level (NN)

Site history
- Built: first recorded 1232

Lichtenstein Castle (German: Burg Lichtenstein) is a high to late medieval hill castle, 380 m above sea level (NN), about six kilometres north of Ebern in the Lower Franconian county of Haßberge in Bavaria. It is located in the municipality of Pfarrweisach.

Of the originally four sub-castles of this great joint-fief or Ganerbenburg only one, the South Castle, is still occupied. The North Castle only survives as ruins. On the site of the now vanished third castle the Protestant Church of the Eternal Flame (Zum Ewigen Licht) was built in the Baroque era. In the southwestern part of the site lie the ruins of a fourth joint-vassal castle seat.

== Literature ==
=== Castle history ===
- Die Kunstdenkmäler des Königreichs Bayern III, 15, Bezirksamt Ebern. München 1916, S. 128–146.
- Joachim Zeune: Burg Lichtenstein. Schnell & Steiner Kunstführer 2364, Regensburg 1998.
- Joachim Zeune: Burgen im Eberner Land. Ebern 2003 (Eberner Heimatblätter, 2 Hefte).

=== Castle legends ===
- Ludwig Bechstein: Der Sagenschatz des Frankenlandes. Wurzburg, 1842.
- Ludwig Bechstein: Deutsches Sagenbuch. Leipzig, 1853 (Digitalisat).
- George Winter: Das Schneidersloch, Das verlorene Kind, Die Gründung des Klosters zu Fürstenfeldbruck… - Fünfzehn Sagen aus dem Bayernlande. Nuremberg, 1849 ( digitalized).
