= Burgfrieden =

Feud ban

The Burgfrieden or Burgfriede was a German medieval term that referred to imposition of a state of truce within the jurisdiction of a castle, and sometimes its estate, under which feuds, i.e. conflicts between private individuals, were forbidden under threat of the imperial ban.

The lord of the castle could also grant asylum in that way, place people under his protection and force his jurisdiction on people. If several parties held joint possession of a castle, being considered joint lords, so-called Burgfrieden agreements were signed, which contained far-reaching rules for living together in the castle.

The granting of Burgfrieden, especially in the Middle Ages, could not be ignored. When visiting other castles, including those of one's enemy, a feud could not be pursued because the Burgfrieden also applied to adversaries within the castle grounds. The Burgfrieden could be terminated by a special feud letter (Fehdebrief), such as to be able to besiege the castle legally.

The Burgfrieden could apply to the entire estate belonging to the castle or, for example, in Ganerbenburg, where it was intended primarily to govern relationships between the co-heirs of the castle, it might apply only to the area of the inner courtyard. If there was no natural demarcation, the area could be marked out by appropriate signs, such as so-called Burgfrieden stones.

At the outbreak of World War I, the political parties in the German Reichstag agreed on a Burgfrieden, or political truce, known as Burgfriedenspolitik, literally "castle peace policy".

== See also ==
- Apage
- Breach of the peace
- Burgfriedenspolitik, a German term used for the political truce the political parties agreed to during World War I
- Feud
- Gottesfrieden
- Landfrieden
- War

== Literature ==
- Gerd Althoff: Spielregeln der Politik im Mittelalter. Kommunikation in Frieden und Fehde. Primus-Verlag, Darmstadt, 1997, ISBN 3-89678-038-7.
- Herbert Obenaus: Recht und Verfassung der Gesellschaften mit St. Jörgenschild in Schwaben. Untersuchung über Adel, Einzug, Schiedsgericht und Fehde im 15. Jahrhundert (Veröffentlichungen des Max-Planck-Instituts für Geschichte; 7). Vandenhoeck & Ruprecht, Göttingen, 1961.
- Margret Sänger: Die Burgfrieden der Grafen von Katzenelnbogen, in: Blätter für deutsche Landesgeschichte 116 (1980), pp. 189–234.
- Christoph Terharn: Die Herforder Fehden. Ein Beitrag zum Fehderecht. Schmitt, Berlin, 1994, ISBN 3-503-03090-5.
- Thomas Vogel: Fehderecht und Fehdepraxis im Spätmittelalter am Beispiel der Reichshauptstadt Nürnberg. Lang, Frankfurt/M. 1998, ISBN 3631-33100-2.
- Felix Busson: Ritterlicher Ehrenschutz. Verlag Franz Pechel, Graz, 1907.
