= Saint-Geniez-ô-Merle =

- Commune
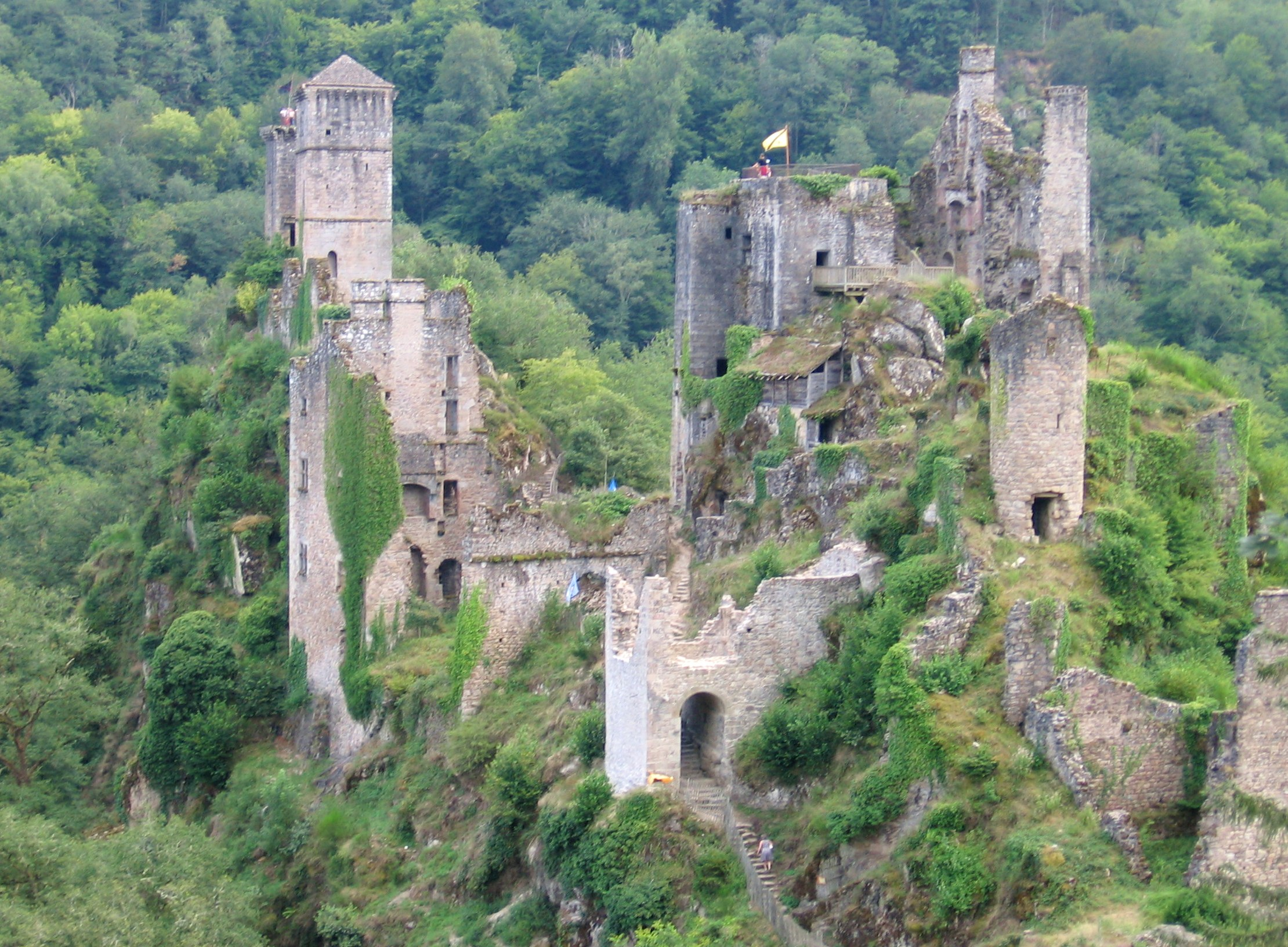
- Tours de Merle

- Coat of arms
- Location of Saint-Geniez-ô-Merle
- Location within France Location within Nouvelle-Aquitaine
- Coordinates: 45°05′03″N 2°03′54″E
- Country: France
- Region: Nouvelle-Aquitaine
- Department: Corrèze
- Arrondissement: Tulle
- Canton: Argentat-sur-Dordogne

Government
  - Mayor (2020–2026): Lionel Jean
- Area^{1}: 15.83 km^{2} (6.11 sq mi)
- Elevation: 500 m (1,600 ft)
- Highest elevation: 563 m (1,847 ft)
- Lowest elevation: 243 m (797 ft)
- Population (2023): 95
  - Density: 6.0/km^{2} (16/sq mi)
- Time zone: UTC+01:00 (CET)
  - Summer (DST): UTC+02:00 (CEST)
- INSEE/Postal code: 19205 /19220
- ^{1} French Land Register data, which excludes lakes, ponds, glaciers > 1 km^{2} (0.386 sq mi or 247 acres) and river estuaries.

Saint-Geniez-ô-Merle (Limousin: Sent Genes au Merle) is a commune in the Corrèze department in central France.

== Geography ==
The Maronne river forms the commune's southern boundary.

== Population ==
Historical population
Year	Pop.	±% p.a.
1968	187	—
1975	169	−1.44%
1982	180	+0.90%
1990	135	−3.53%
1999	116	−1.67%
2007	105	−1.24%
2012	101	−0.77%
2017	90	−2.28%
2023	95	+0.91%
Source: INSEE

== See also ==
- Communes of the Corrèze department
