= Bad Neustadt an der Saale =

- Town
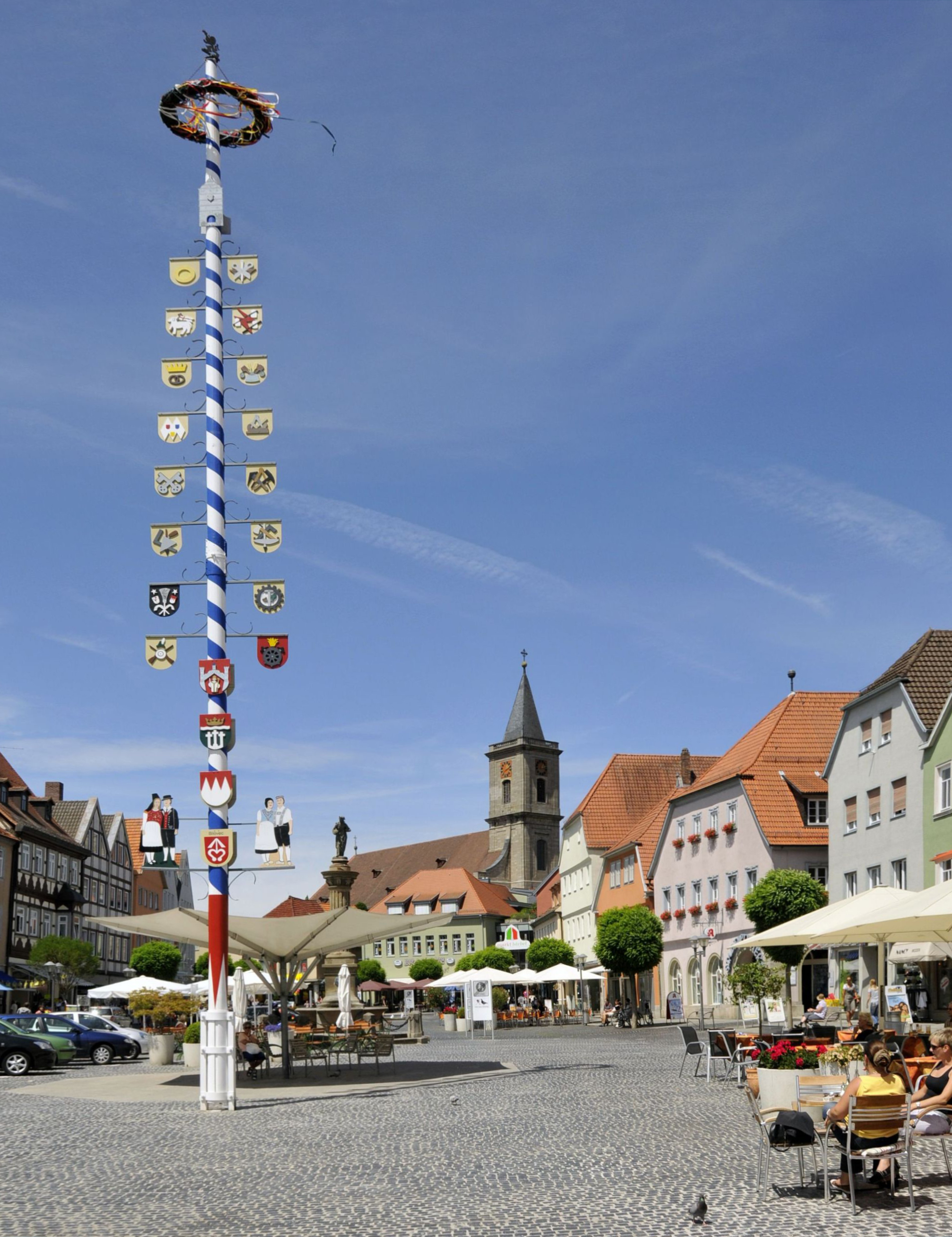
- Market square with the Church of the Assumption of the Virgin Mary in the background

- Coat of arms

- Location of Bad Neustadt an der Saale within Rhön-Grabfeld district
- Interactive map of Bad Neustadt an der Saale
- Location within Germany Location within Bavaria
- Coordinates: 50°19′19″N 10°12′58″E
- Country: Germany
- State: Bavaria
- Admin. region: Lower Franconia
- District: Rhön-Grabfeld

Government
  - Mayor (2020–26): Michael Werner

Area
  - Total: 36.89 km^{2} (14.24 sq mi)
- Elevation: 242 m (794 ft)

Population (2025-12-31)
  - Total: 15,405
  - Density: 417.6/km^{2} (1,082/sq mi)
- Time zone: UTC+01:00 (CET)
  - Summer (DST): UTC+02:00 (CEST)
- Postal codes: 97616
- Dialling codes: 09771
- Vehicle registration: NES
- Website: bad-neustadt.de

Bad Neustadt an der Saale (German pronunciation: [baːt ˈnɔʏʃtat ʔan deːɐ̯ ˈzaːlə], lit. 'Bad Neustadt on the Saale'), officially Bad Neustadt a.d.Saale and often simply called Bad Neustadt, is a town in northern Bavaria, Germany. It is the capital of the Rhön-Grabfeld district in Lower Franconia. It is situated on the rivers Franconian Saale and Brend, near the Rhön Mountains, 30 km north of Schweinfurt, and 47 km southeast of Fulda.

== Town structure ==
Between 1972 and 1978 some originally separate villages were gathered together administratively and became part of Bad Neustadt. So today Bad Neustadt has the following Stadtteile (parts of the town):

- Old town of Bad Neustadt (1,858)
- Western part of Bad Neustadt (2,515)
- Gartenstadt (2,235)
- Brendlorenzen (4,390)
- Dürrnhof (291)
- Herschfeld (2,716)
- Lebenhan (492)
- Löhrieth (288)
- Mühlbach (972)

(Number of inhabitants in brackets)

== History ==
The church St. Martin in Brendlorenzen (part of the town Bad Neustadt) was first mentioned in 742 when the Bishopric of Würzburg was founded. The church was later renamed St. Johannes der Täufer (Saint John the Baptiste church) as it became a baptism church.

In 790 Charlemagne founded the palatinate Salz in the territory of Bad Neustadt. Neustadt was first mentioned as nova civitas in a document of the bishop of Würzburg in the year 1232. The medieval town wall of Bad Neustadt is shaped as a heart. So it is part of a romantic legend. According to this, the town was founded by Charlemagne as a present for his beloved wife, Fastrada.

== Main sights ==
The castle Salzburg on a hill near Bad Neustadt was founded in the 12th century. The castle was never destroyed but often renovated so the architecture has elements of Roman art, Gothic art, and Renaissance art.

== Economics and infrastructure ==
The Rhön Klinikum AG that is headquartered in Bad Neustadt is a well known enterprise for several specialized hospitals in Germany. The hospitals in Bad Neustadt are especially famous for cardiac and hand surgery.

== Neustadt in Europe and twin towns ==
In 1979, Bad Neustadt founded a community of all towns called Neustadt (new town). Today, 34 towns of 5 different countries are members of this project Neustadt in Europe. Bad Neustadt is the only Neustadt with the prefix Bad (spa town).

Bad Neustadt has the following twin towns:

- Falaise, France since 1969
- (United Kingdom) Pershore, Great Britain
- Cerro Maggiore, Italy
- Oberhof, Germany
- Oberpullendorf, Austria
- Bílovec, Czech Republic
- Israel

There are annual student exchanges with Falaise, Israel, and Pershore, as well as with Rochester Adams High School in Rochester Hills, United States and Smith's Hill High School in Wollongong, New South Wales, Australia.

== Sport ==
Soccer is the most popular sport in Bad Neustadt. There are six football clubs (VfL Sportfreunde Bad Neustadt, TSV Brendlorenzen, SV Herschfeld, DJK Mühlbach, DJK Lebenhan, DJK Löhrieth).

In spite of this Bad Neustadt is most successful in handball. Bad Neustadt has played in the third division (Regionalliga) for several years. One season Bad Neustadt even played in the second division (2nd Bundesliga).

During the 2006 FIFA World Cup Bad Neustadt was the host town of the national team of Anguilla. According to the FIFA rankings, Anguilla was ranked 196 out of 205 teams in 2006. As a member of the FIFA family the team was invited as a representative for all not-qualified teams.

== Sons and daughters of the town ==
- Margarethe Luther, née Lindemann (1459-1531), mother of Martin Luther
- Willi Ankermüller (1901-1986), German jurist and politician
- Karl Ludwig Freiherr von und zu Guttenberg (1902-1945), German Resistance fighter in World War II
- Thomas Kessler (born 1955), general vicar of the diocese of Würzburg
- Candy DeRouge (alias Wolfgang Detmann) music producer and songwriter
- Uwe Müller (born 1960), German author
- Nosie Katzmann, (born 1959), German music producer
- Benjamin Schöckel (born 1980), German footballer
