= Cowl =

Long, hooded garment worn over religious habits

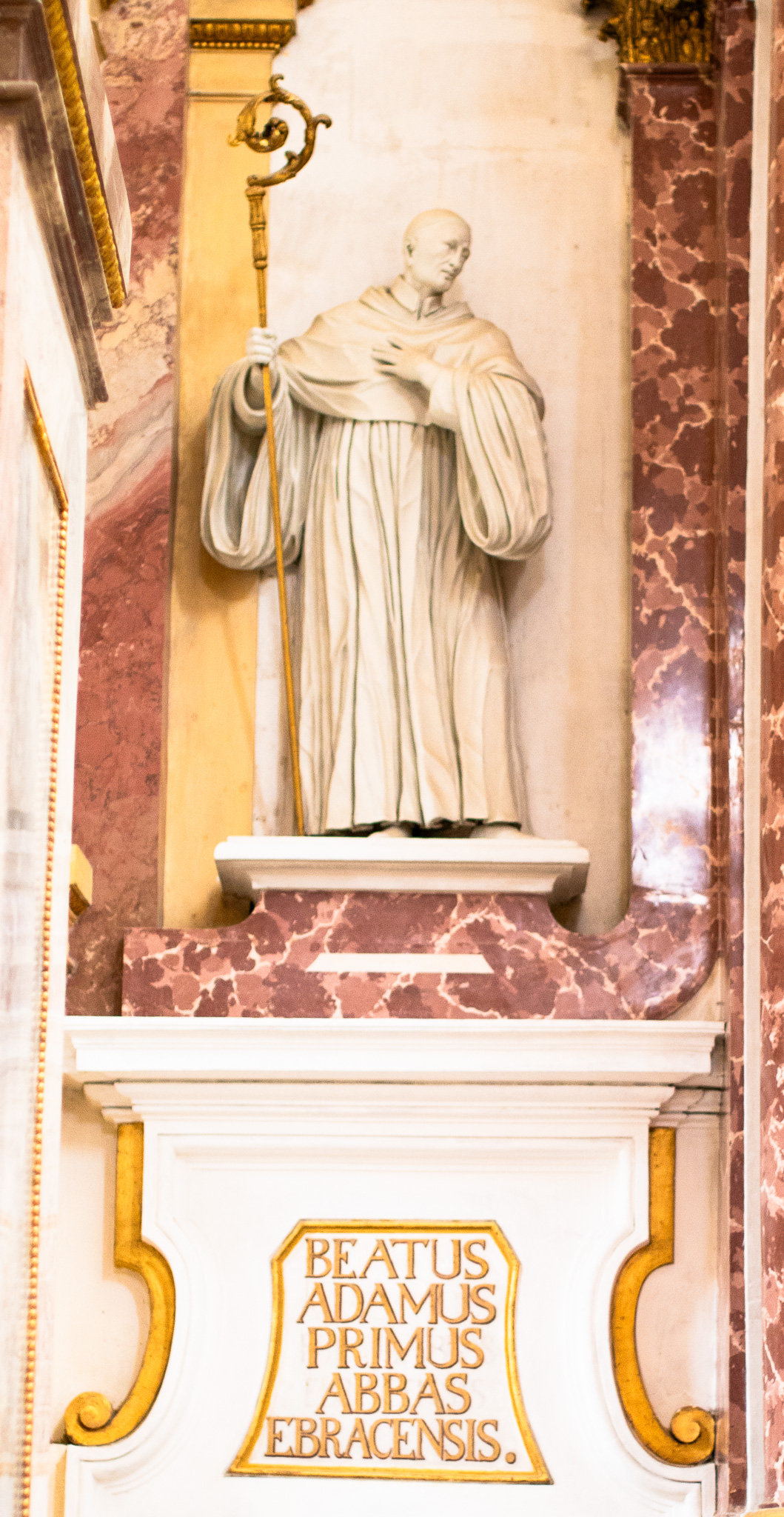
Statue of the Cistercian abbot Adam of Ebrach in his cowl

A cowl is an item of clothing consisting of a long and wrinkled, hooded garment with extra-wide sleeves, worn by monks or nuns living in monastic orders. The cowl is traditionally bestowed upon the monk or the nun at the time of making a solemn vows. The cut of the garment is the same for men or women. The cowl should not be confused with the choir robe of some mendicant orders, which is given to members of these communities already upon investiture.

The garment was developed during the Early Middle Ages and the term may have originally referred to the hooded portion of a cloak, though contemporary usage refers to an entire closed garment.

== Description ==
Religious habit of a Cistercian nun wearing the cowl

Developed during the Early Middle Ages, the cowl became the formal garment for those in monastic life. Both the Church Fathers Jerome and John Cassian refer to it as part of a monk's dress. In modern times, it is worn over the habit during liturgical services. Originally, cowl may have referred simply to the hooded portion of a cloak. In contemporary usage, however, it is distinguished from a cloak or cape (cappa) by the fact that it refers to an entire closed garment consisting of a long, hooded garment with wide sleeves.

Approximately nine meters of fabric are used to make a cowl. The wide sleeves are particularly striking, so that Rafael Barón, a Trappist, wrote on the day of his solemn vows: "I'm quite happy with my wide sleeves, although I don't know what to do with them. O dear brother, if only I had as much love for God as I have fabric in abundance!"

== Monastical usage ==
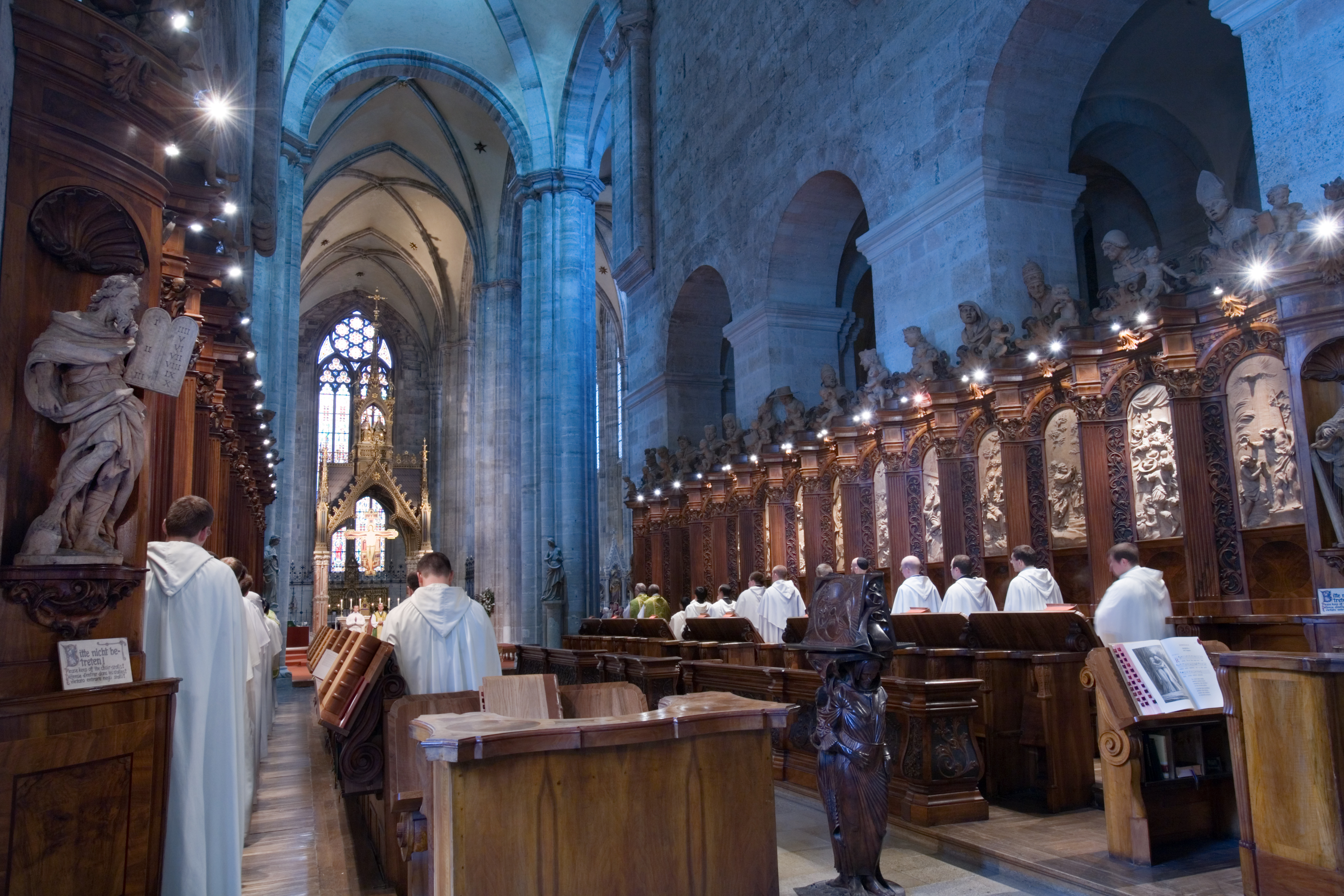
Cistercians wearing their cowls in Heiligenkreuz Abbey

The cowl is traditionally bestowed upon the monk or nun at the time of making solemn vows. It is handed to the newly professed during the celebration of the solemn profession, as one of the explanatory rites. The cowl and the professed recipient are sprinkled with holy water, while the abbot speaks for example: Accipe uestem, indue sanctitatis decorem eqs ("Take the garment, put on the beauty of holiness").

The cowl is generally worn over the ordinary habit and in conformity with the color of the monk's or nun's tunic; other groups which follow the Rule of St. Benedict, e.g., the Camaldolese, the Cistercians or Carthusians, wearing white. The cowl is worn at the major hours (Lauds and Vespers) in choir, at the Holy Mass, at chapter. Both the Rule of Saint Benedict and the Analecta Cisterciensia provide that in winter a cowl made of a coarser cloth with very thick wool should be worn, while in summer a thin or worn one, "with fewer tufts" was to be taken. The abbot or abbess may grant a dispensation from wearing the cowl, for example on particularly hot days.

Black has been the prevailing color for Benedictines, hence the term "black monk" has come to signify a Benedictine. Previous generations had lengthened the garment until it reached to the heels, and Saint Benedict issued a rule restricting its length to two cubits. Similarly, the Cistercians are known as the "white monks", in reference to the color of the cuculla, the term for the white choir robe worn over their habits.

While not cowls in the monastic sense, the mendicant orders have retained the use of a cappa ("cape") as part of their habit. In their case, however, it is a regular part of their religious habit and worn by all members of the community who wear the religious habit: The Carmelites wear a white mantle, although their tunic and scapular are brown. Dominicans wear a black cape over a white habit.
