= Langheim Abbey =

Coordinates: 50°06′44″N 11°06′36″E

Langheim Abbey was a well-known Cistercian monastery in Klosterlangheim, part of the town of Lichtenfels in Upper Franconia, Bavaria, Germany, in the Bishopric of Bamberg.

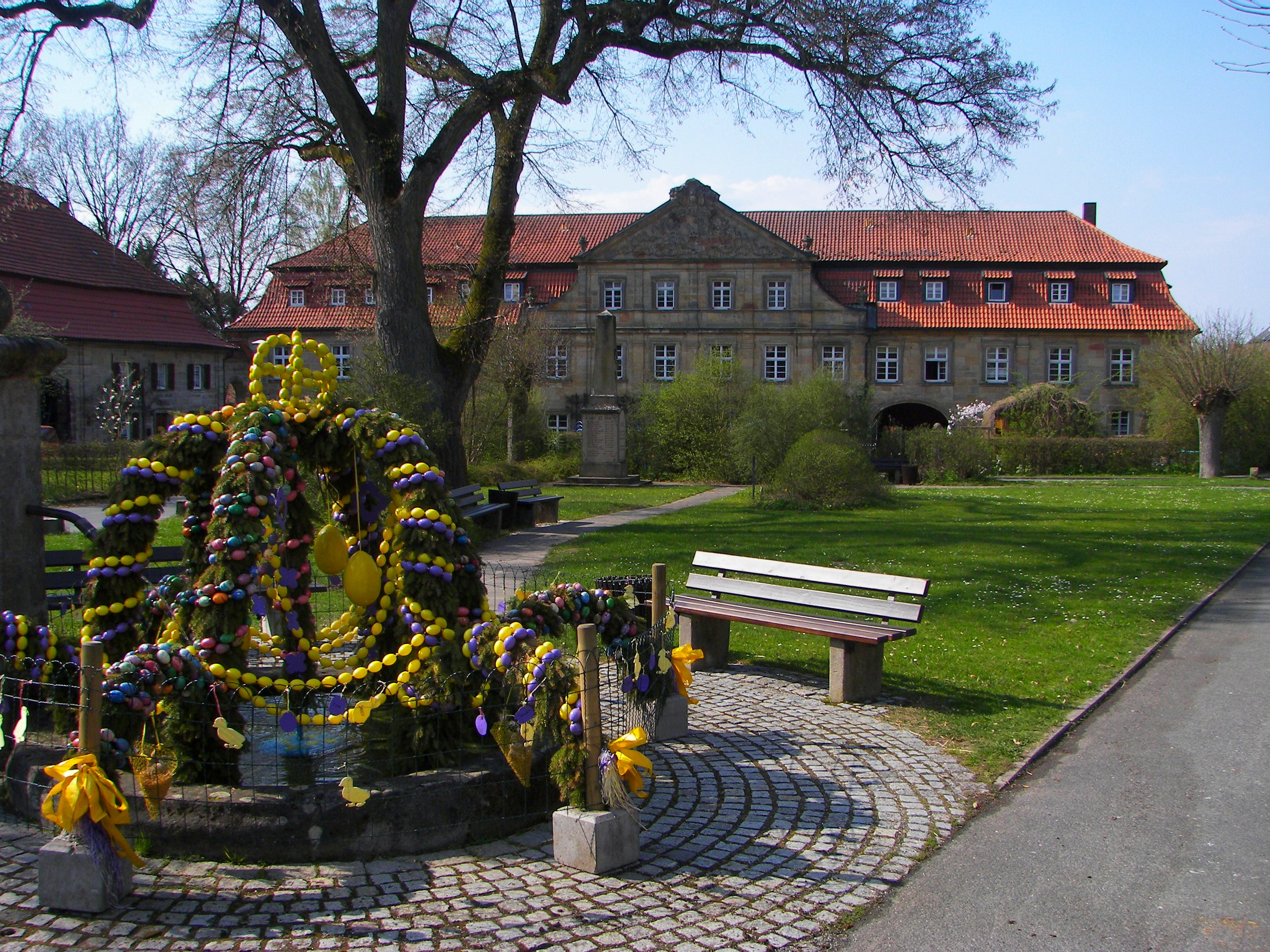
Ökonomiehof with decorated fountain at Eastern

== History ==
Three brothers from the city of Bamberg (from what became the Rotenhan family and Redwitz from Rodach family) made a gift of the estate of Langheim to Otto I, bishop of Bamberg, who in 1132 offered it Adam of Ebrach, abbot of the Cistercian Ebrach Abbey, on condition that it should be used for the establishment of a new monastery of that order. The first stone was laid on 1 August 1132 and in 1142 the buildings were completed. The abbey, like Ebrach, was dedicated to the Virgin Mary, John the Evangelist and Saint Nicholas.

The first abbot was Adam (1141–80), who succeeded in gaining the support not only of the bishops of Bamberg but of the local nobility. In consequence the new abbey rapidly acquired extensive property and the cure of many parishes. Pope Eugene III and the emperors granted it many privileges. It was famous at this time for its wealth and magnificence.

By about 1380, however, as result of plague and economic difficulties, the abbey administration had more or less failed, and in 1385 Lambrecht von Brunn, bishop of Bamberg, was able without resistance to divert the abbey's management and property to the cathedral chapter. In 1429 the Hussites destroyed the buildings by fire.

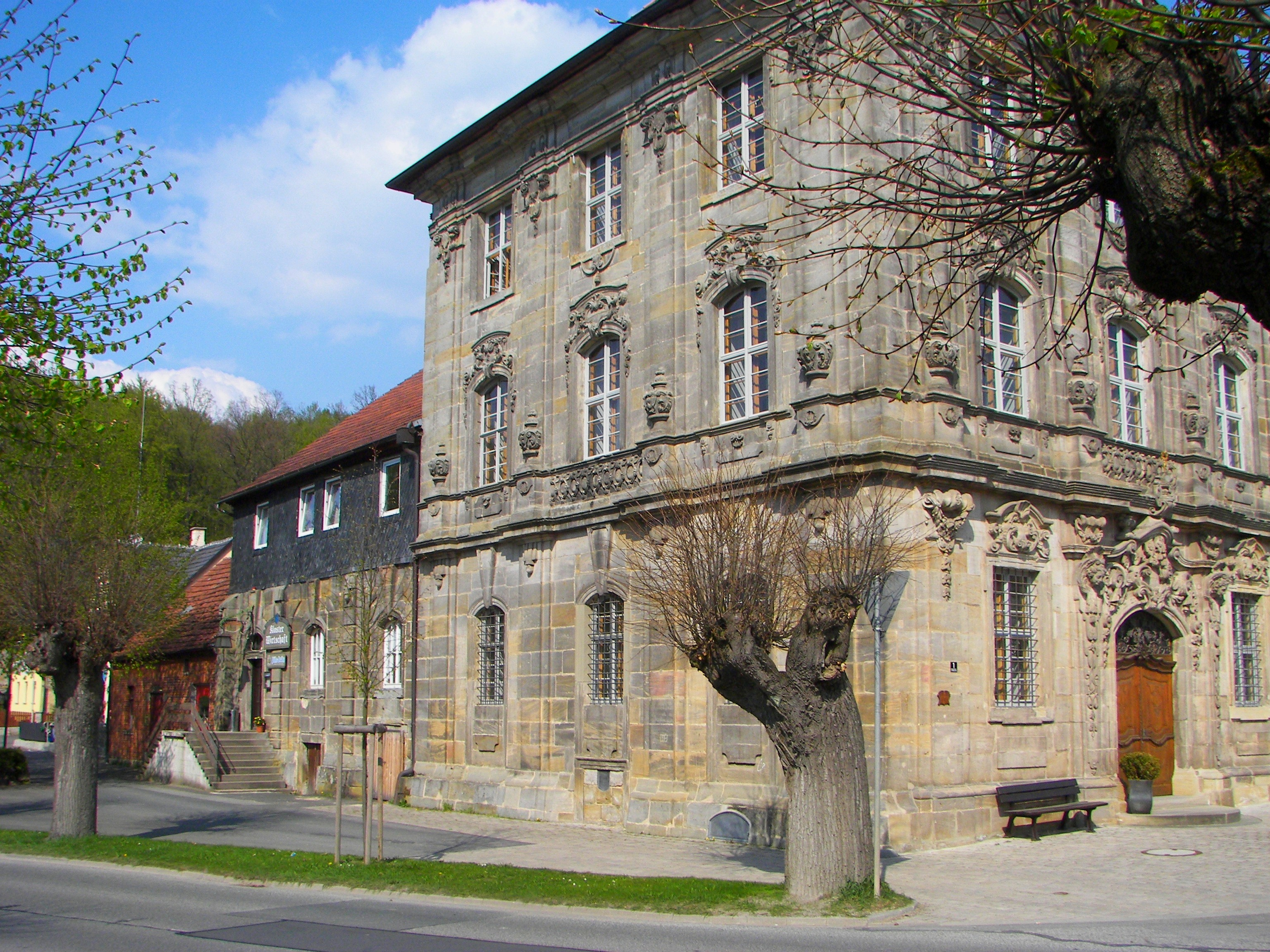
Konventbau

Langheim was able nevertheless to recover from these misfortunes and to re-build the premises and its economic stability, but in 1525, during the German Peasants' Wars, it was once again burnt down by a rioting mob.

It was re-built yet again, only to be destroyed yet again with particular brutality in 1632 by the Swedes during the Thirty Years' War.

It took a century for the abbey to recover from this, but abbot Stephen Mösinger (1734–51) was at last able to have the monastery reconstructed on a scale and to a standard that recalled the first building. During this interval the bishops of Bamberg had again become favorable to the abbey, although they failed to restore either the property they had taken or the former privileges. The bishop did intervene in the abbey's finances, when in 1788 he suspended the then abbot on account of the huge debts that had been incurred for building works.

The final catastrophe occurred on 7 May 1802, when fire destroyed the splendid buildings erected by Stephen Mösinger and put an end to Langheim. On 23 June 1803, the community, at that time numbering forty-nine members, was secularised by a decree of the Prince Elector of Bavaria. The monks were dispersed to various places, and the last abbot, Candide Hemmerlein, received a pension of 8000 florins, with which he retired to Thieb Castle, where he died in 1814.

== After dissolution ==
The remnants of the buildings after the fire were unsafe and were demolished, including the abbey church. A few structural items survive incorporated in the town centre of Klosterlangheim.

== Monks of Langheim ==
This abbey gave to the Catholic Church in Germany many distinguished bishops and also writers. These include the monk Engelrich, who wrote the "Leben der hl. Mathilde, Abtissin von Edelstetten" ("Life of Saint Mechtilde, Abbess of Edelstetten"); and Simon Schreiner of the seventeenth century, who composed a treatise on the Fourteen Holy Helpers and an "Apologia contra Lutheranos". The abbot Mauritius Knauer, a distinguished mathematician and astronomer, published a number of works on the natural sciences and also an ascetical work entitled "Tuba Coeli" (1649–64). The most prolific author was however Joachim Jaeck, who after secularisation published the results of his extensive researches on the history of Bamberg and the surrounding country.

== Foundations ==
=== Plass Abbey ===
In 1144 Langheim founded Plass Abbey in the diocese of Prague.

=== Vierzehnheiligenbasilika ===
In 1445 Abbot Frederick Hengelein had built at Bad Staffelstein near Frankenthal, as a dependency of the abbey, a church in honour of the Fourteen Holy Helpers, which soon became a popular place of pilgrimage. Abbot Mösinger, after the re-construction of the main abbey complex was completed, commissioned Balthasar Neumann to re-build it as a Baroque church. It survived the destruction of the abbey, after the dissolution of which it was entrusted to the care of the Franciscans and still stands today as the Basilica of the Vierzehnheiligen.

== Abbots from 1556 ==
- 1556–1562 Friedrich Marschalk
- 1562–1572 Ludwig Fuchs
- 1572–1582 Magnus Hofmann
- 1582–1584 Wilhelm Krenich
- 1584–1592 Konrad Holzmann
- 1592–1608 Johann Bückling
- 1608–1620 Peter Schönfelder
- 1620–1626 Johann Weiger
- 1626–1631 Erasmus Behem (or Böhm)
- 1631–1637 Nikolaus Eber
- 1637–1649 Johann Gagel
- 1649–1664 Mauritius Knauer
- 1664–1677 Alberich Semmelmann
- 1677–1689 Thomas Wagner
- 1689–1690 Candidus Bergmann
- 1690–1728 Gallus Knauer
- 1728–1734 Martin Wolf
- 1734–1751 Stephan Mösinger
- 1751–1774 Malachias Limmer
- 1774–1791 Johann Nepomuk Pitius (suspended from 1788)
- 1791–1803 Candidus Hemmerlein
