= Rotenhan Castle =

Castle ruin in Lower Franconia, Bavaria, Germany

- Burgruine Rotenhan
- Haßberge (district), Bavaria; Near Ebern in Germany
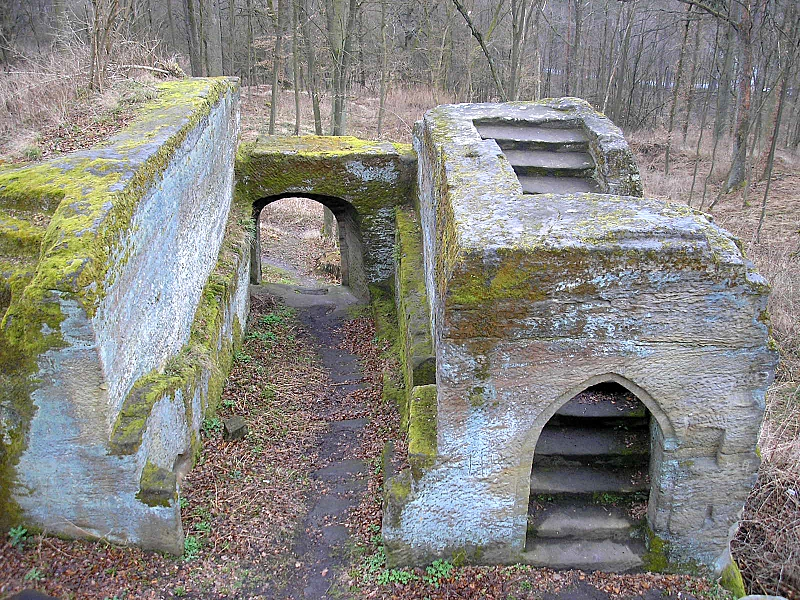

Site information
- Type: Castle
- Condition: Ruined

Location
- Coordinates: 50°6′52.2″N 10°47′22.8″E

Site history
- Built: C. 1190
- Materials: Sandstone

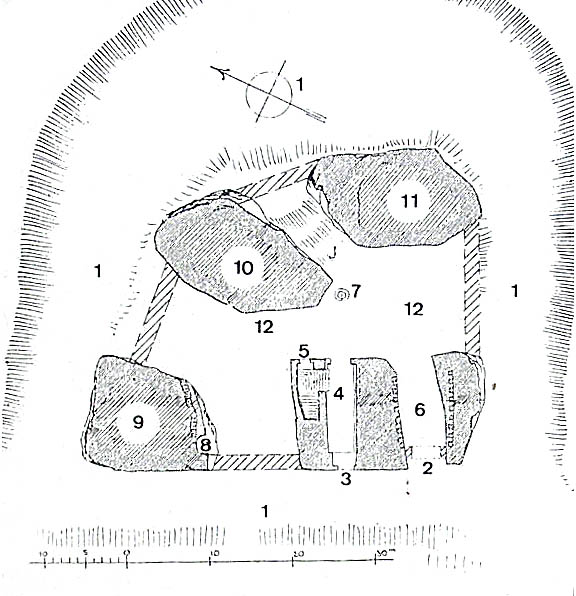
Inaccurate overview map on the information board in front of the castle (after recording the monument's inventory in 1916): 1: Moat 2: Alleged main gate (Zeune) 3 and 4: The secondary gate (Zeune) or actual main gate 5: sunrises to the upper floor of the gate building 6: Supposed Torgasse to the main gate 7: Well 8: Cistern 9: Northwest rocks, tank cistern 10: Eastern rock 11: Ostfels with the last remaining walls 12: Courtyard. The terrain profile with height differences of up to three meters (not shown)

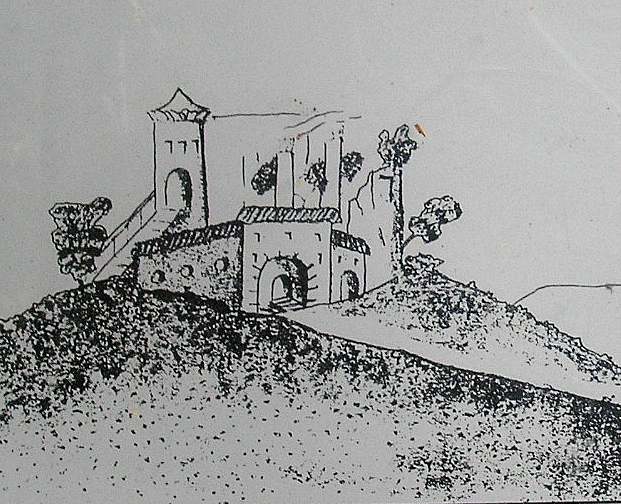
Reconstruction of the castle from the 19th Century.

Rotenhan Castle (German: Burg Rotenhan) is a castle ruin about two kilometres north of the village of Eyrichshof in Lower Franconia in the south German state of Bavaria. Eyrichshof lies within the borough of Ebern in the district of Haßberge. The castle is the ancestral home (Stammsitz) of the House of Rotenhan, a family of imperial knights.

== History ==
The Rotenhan family has its roots in three von Langheim brothers, who were the co-founders of Langheim Abbey in 1132. Later the name "de Rotha(ha)" was used. In 1229, reference is made to a Winther and Wolfram "de Rotenhagen" in connexion with an allodial holding of the family rather than a fief. The doorway to the staircase entrance belongs to the late Romanesque-early Gothic period. In 1323 the castle was besieged by the Bishop of Würzburg, Wolfram Wolfskeel von Grumbach, for a year under the pretext of that the family had been involved in counterfeiting and a breach of feudal loyalty. After it was finally captured, the structure was destroyed and, according to a treaty of 1324, was never to be rebuilt. Later, the House of Rotenhan built a new castle, Eyrichshof, further down the hill below the site of Rotenhan.

== Photo gallery ==
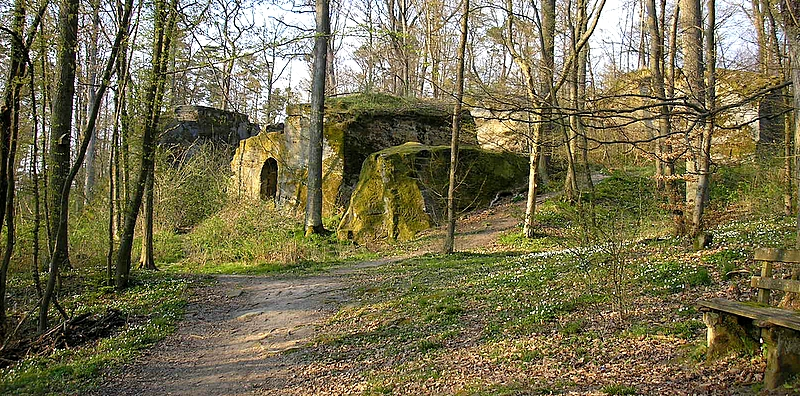
Total view from the south

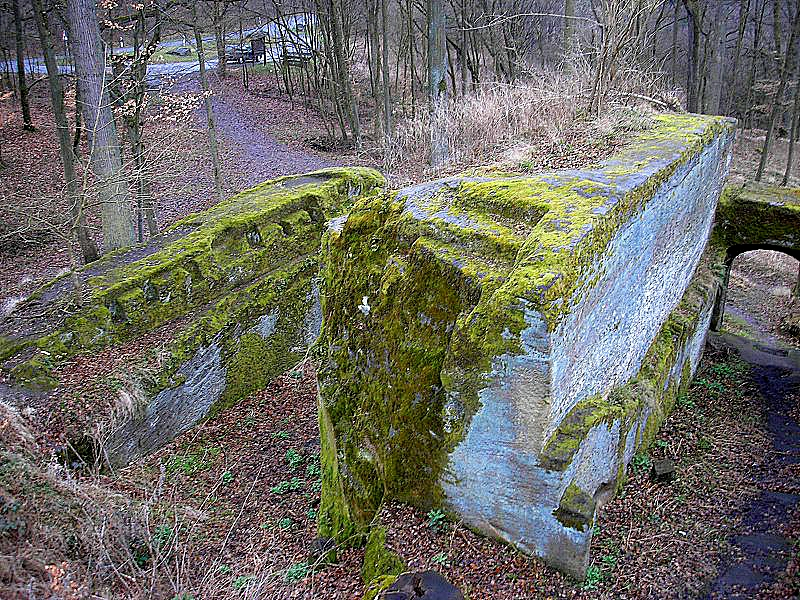
The south eastern part of the castle with the gatehouse

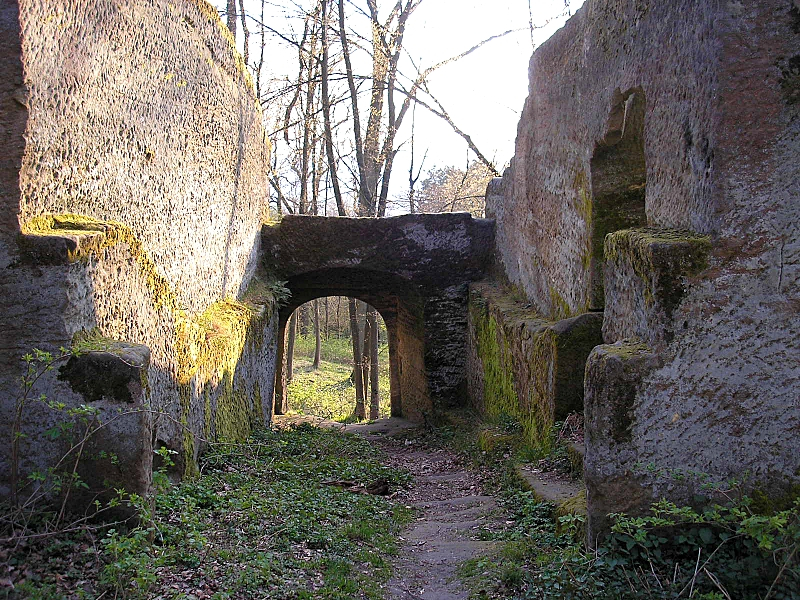

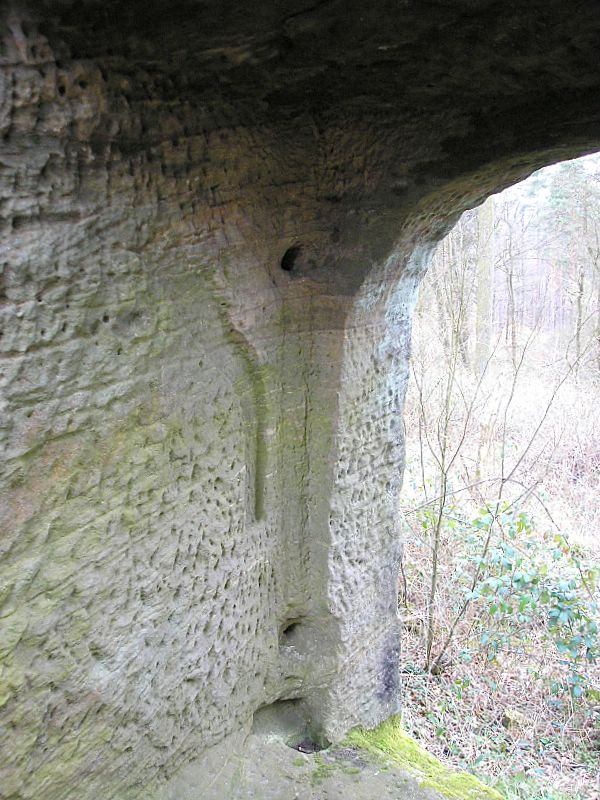

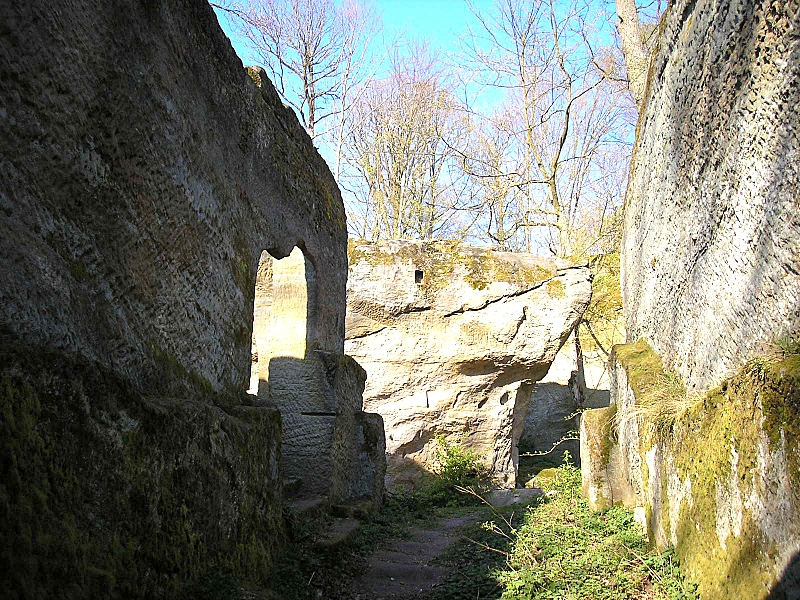

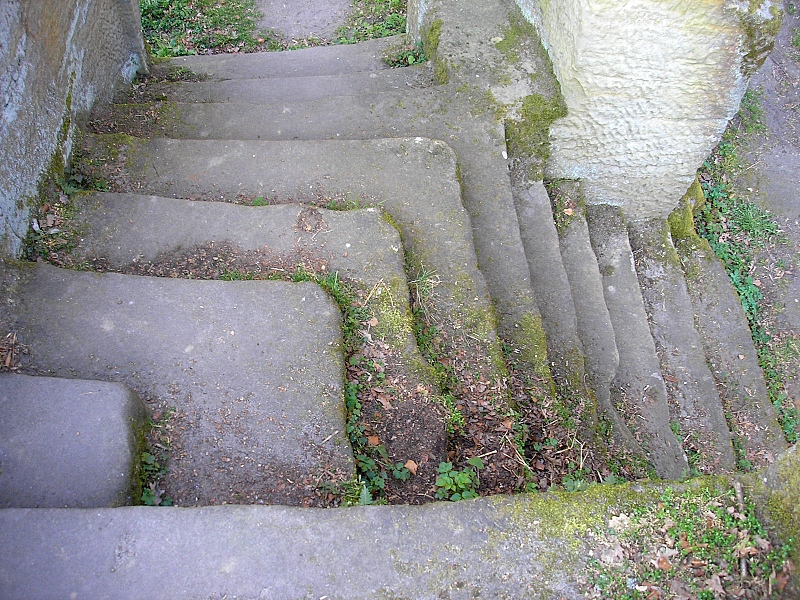

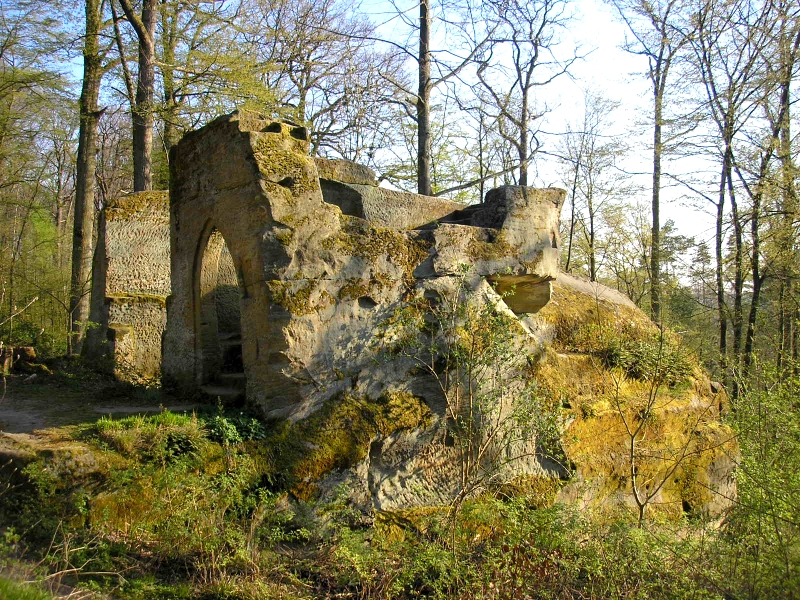

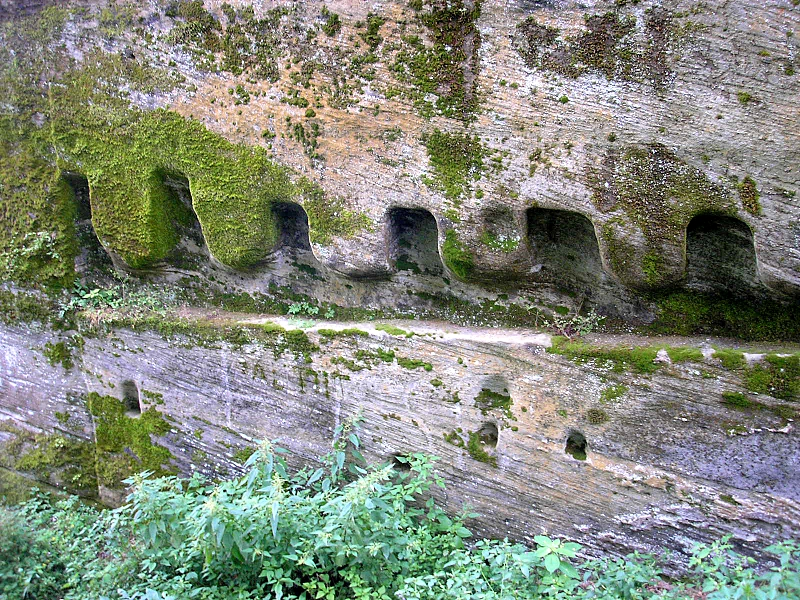
The eastern part of the gatehouse

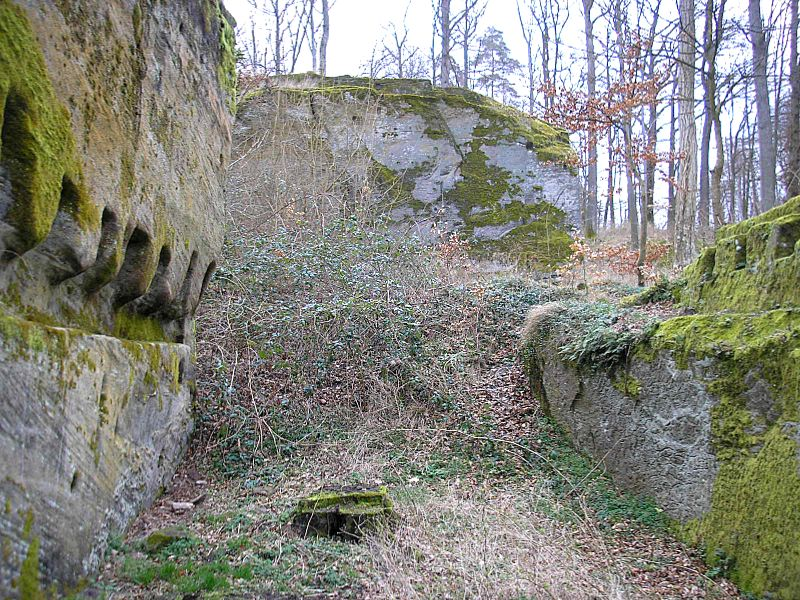

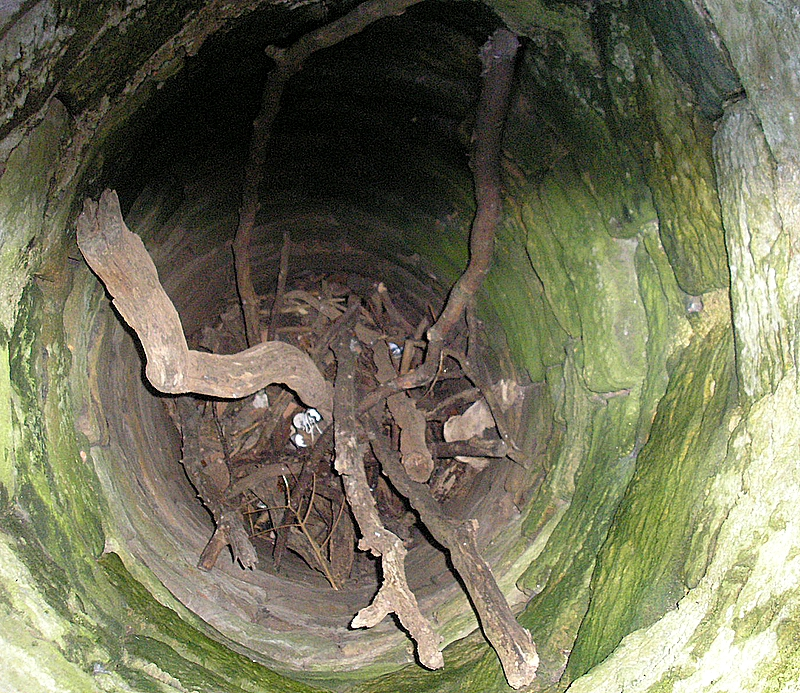
the Well

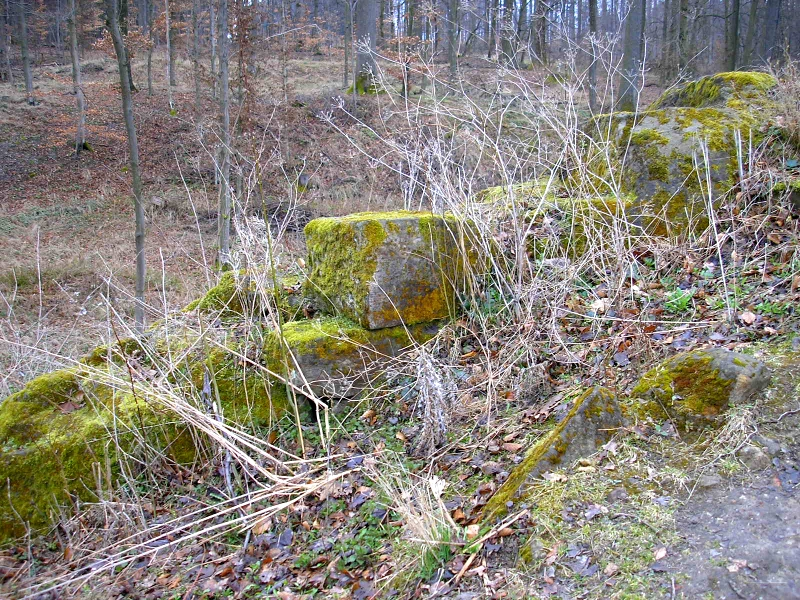
The last stones of the old castle on the eastern rock

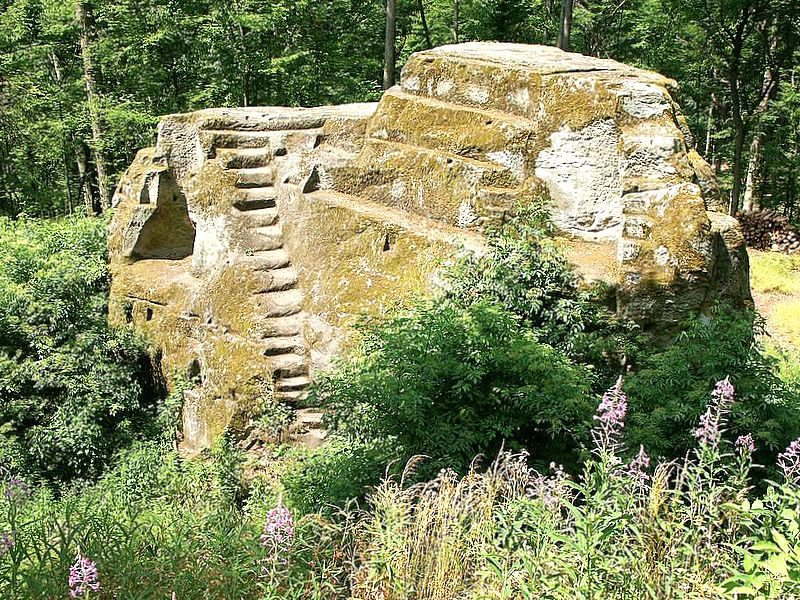

== Literature ==
- Genealogisches Handbuch des in Bayern immatrikulierten Adels. Band 13. Degener, Neustadt an der Aisch/Mittelfranken 1988, P. 567–578.
- Genealogisches Handbuch des Adels, Vol. 125, Adelslexikon, 2001, C.A. Starke Verlag, ISBN 3-7980-0825-6
- Die Kunstdenkmäler des Königreichs Bayern, III, 15, Bezirksamt Ebern, P. 197–201. (Munich, 1916)
- Isolde Maierhöfer: Ebern (Historischer Atlas von Bayern, Teil Franken, Vol. 15). Munich, 1964
- Joachim Zeune: Burgen im Eberner Land, Ebern 2003, Eberner Heimatblätter, 2 volumes
- Bitha Rotenhan: Rotenhan-Häuser - ein Bilderbuch. Bamberg, 1988
- Gottfried Frhr. von Rotenhan: Die Rotenhan. Genealogie einer fränkischen Familie von 1229 bis zum Dreißigjährigen Krieg. (publications by the Society for Frankish History, Series IX, Vol. 34). Neustadt an der Aisch, 1985
- Julius Frhr. von Rotenhan: Geschichte der Familie von Rotenhan älterer Linie. 2 volumes, 1865
- Siegfried Frhr. von Rotenhan: Geschichte der Familie Rotenhan. Rentweinsdorf, self-publication, 1989
