= Bramberg Castle =

Coordinates: 50°06.5′N 10°38.1′E

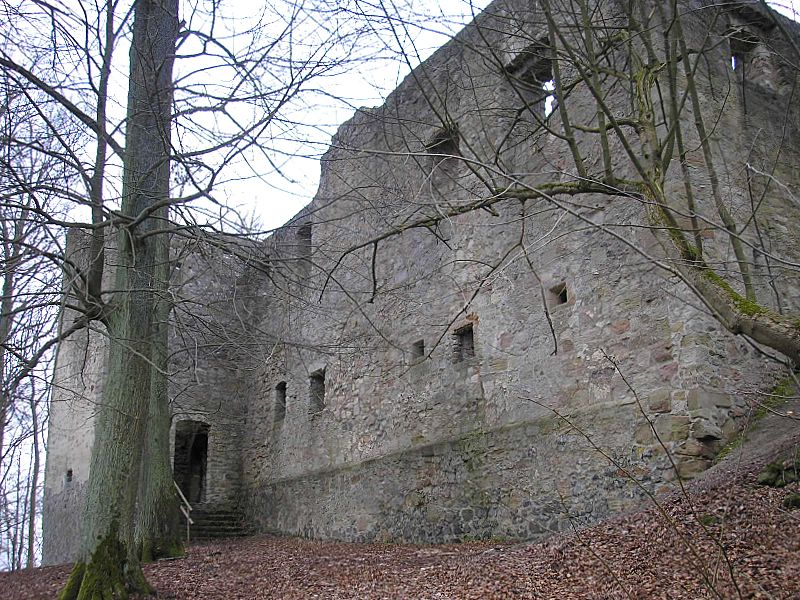
Main structure

Bramberg Castle (German: Burg Bramberg) is the ruin of a Würzburg castle in the Haßberge hills in the county of Haßberge in Lower Franconia, Bavaria Germany.

The ruin is located on the Bramberg hill (495 metres). It is about 2 km north west of the village of Bramberg, part of the municipality of Ebern. Destroyed during the German Peasants' War in 1525, it is accessible by parking just off the road and hiking up the hill.

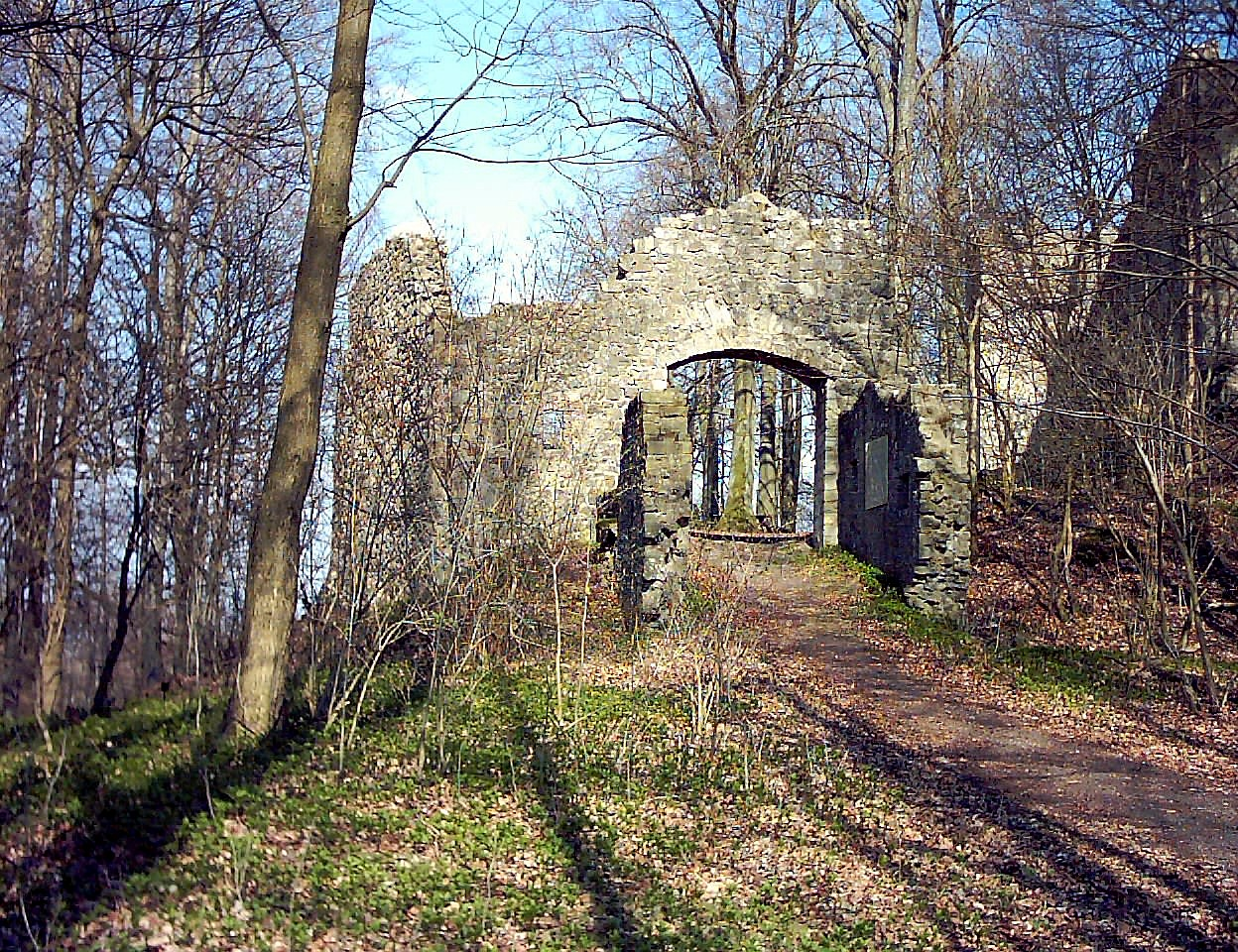

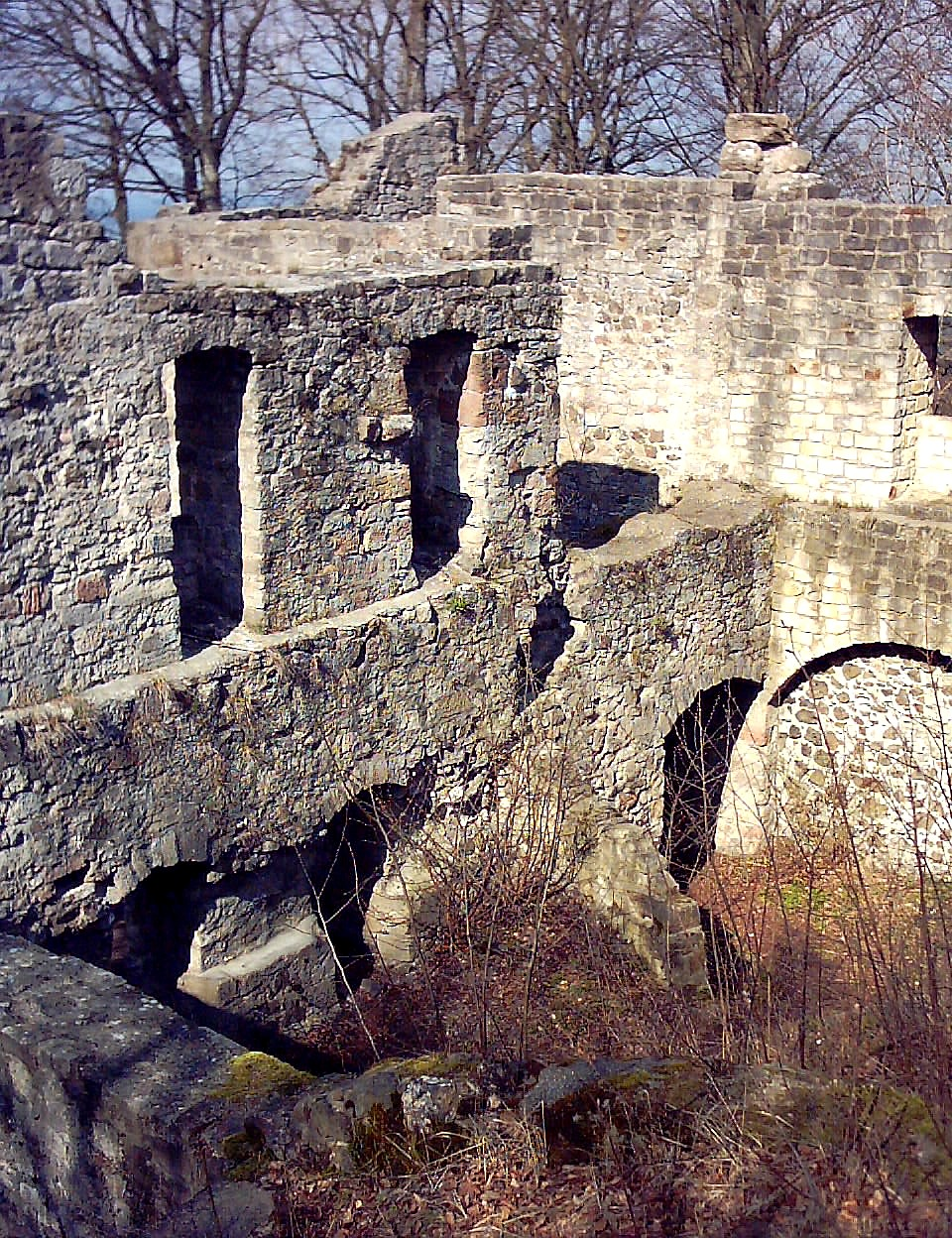
Interior of the main structure with gate tower

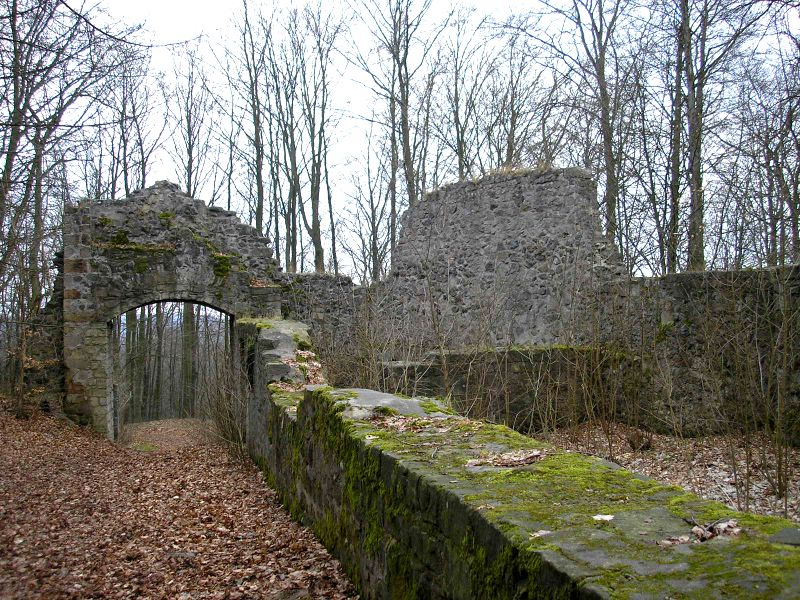
Gate and commerce building

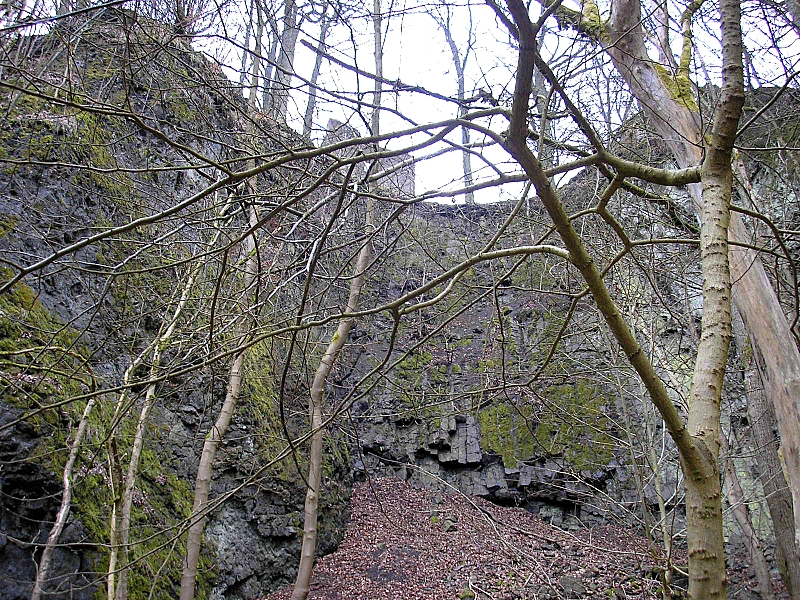

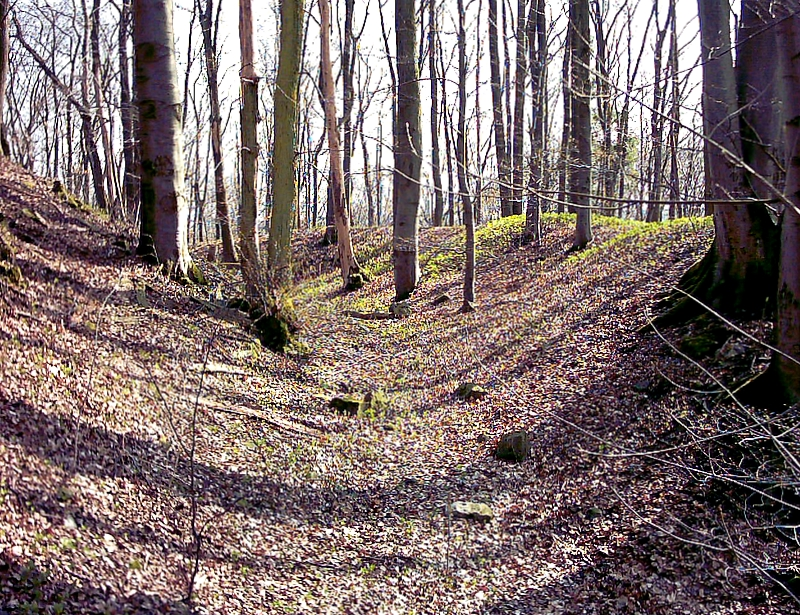

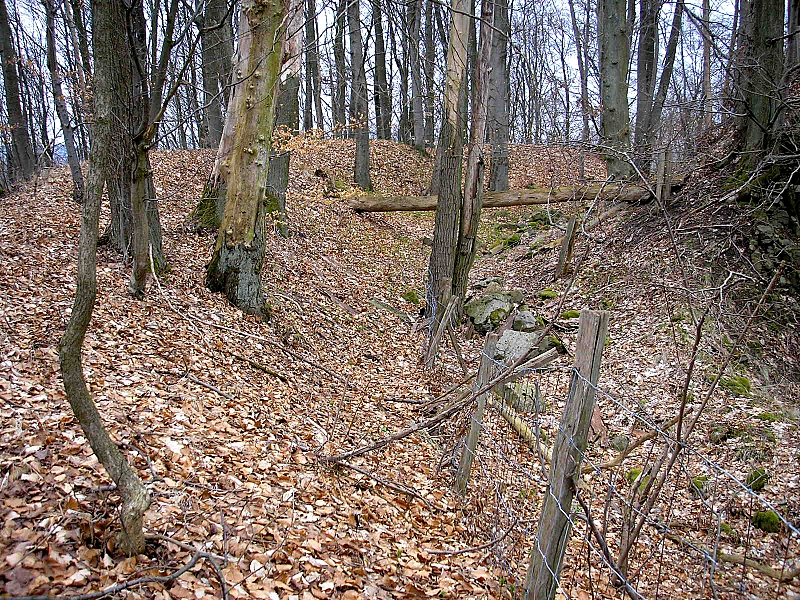

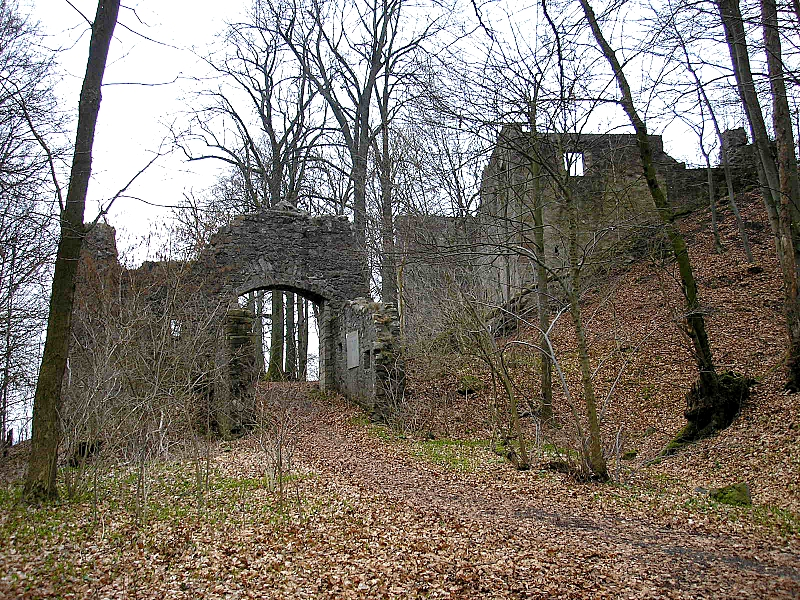

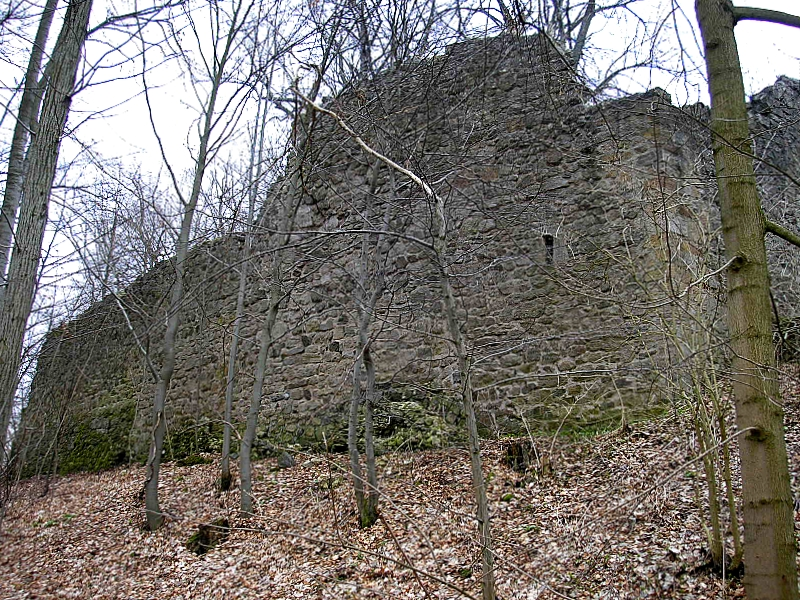

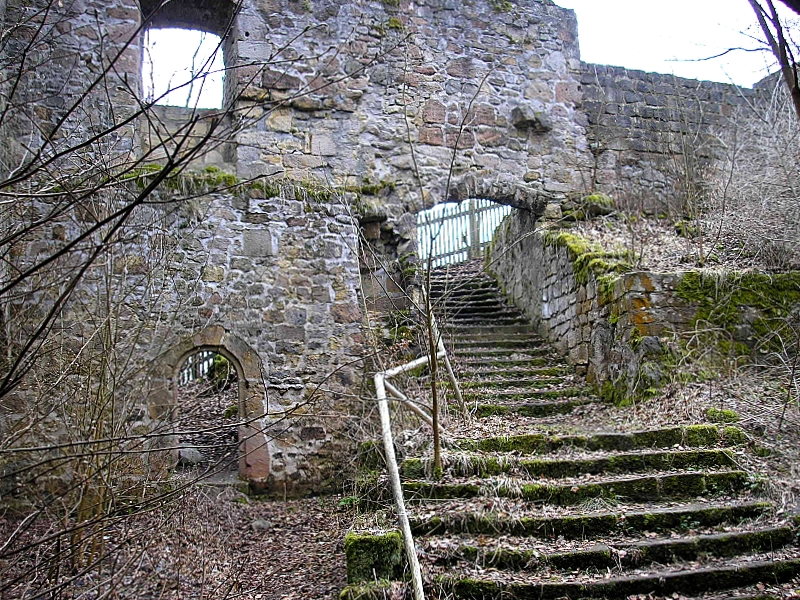

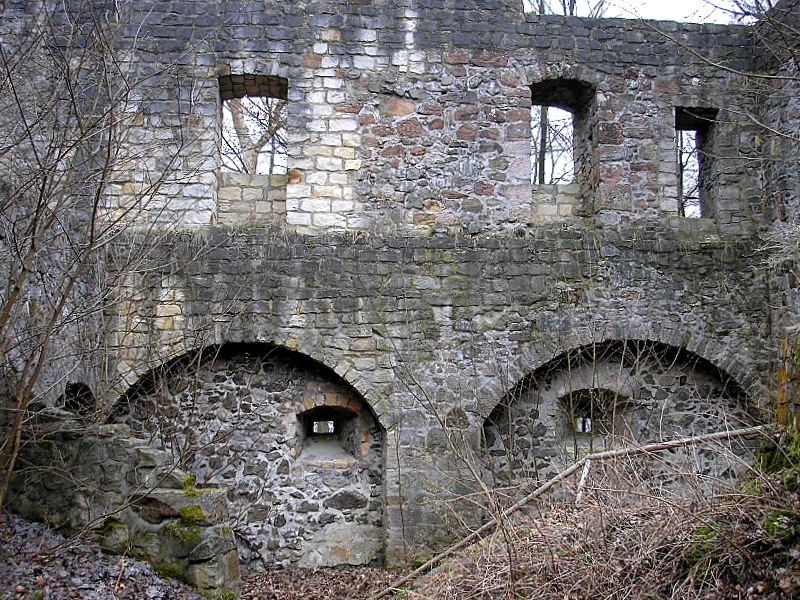

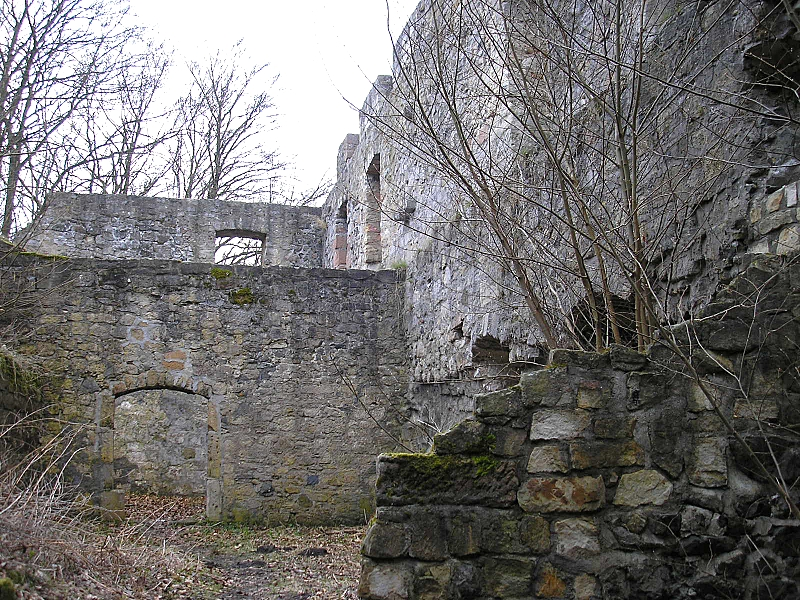

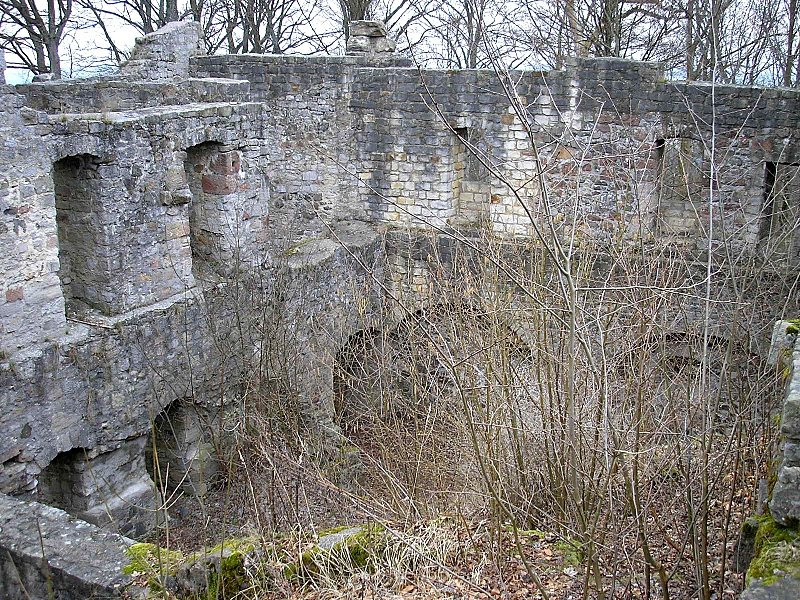

== Literature ==
- Die Kunstdenkmäler des Königreichs Bayern, III,5, Bezirksamt Hofheim, pp. 31–34, Munich, 1912
- Joachim Zeune: Burgen im Eberner Land. Ebern, 2003, (Eberner Heimatblätter, Volume 2)
