= Ebern =

- Town
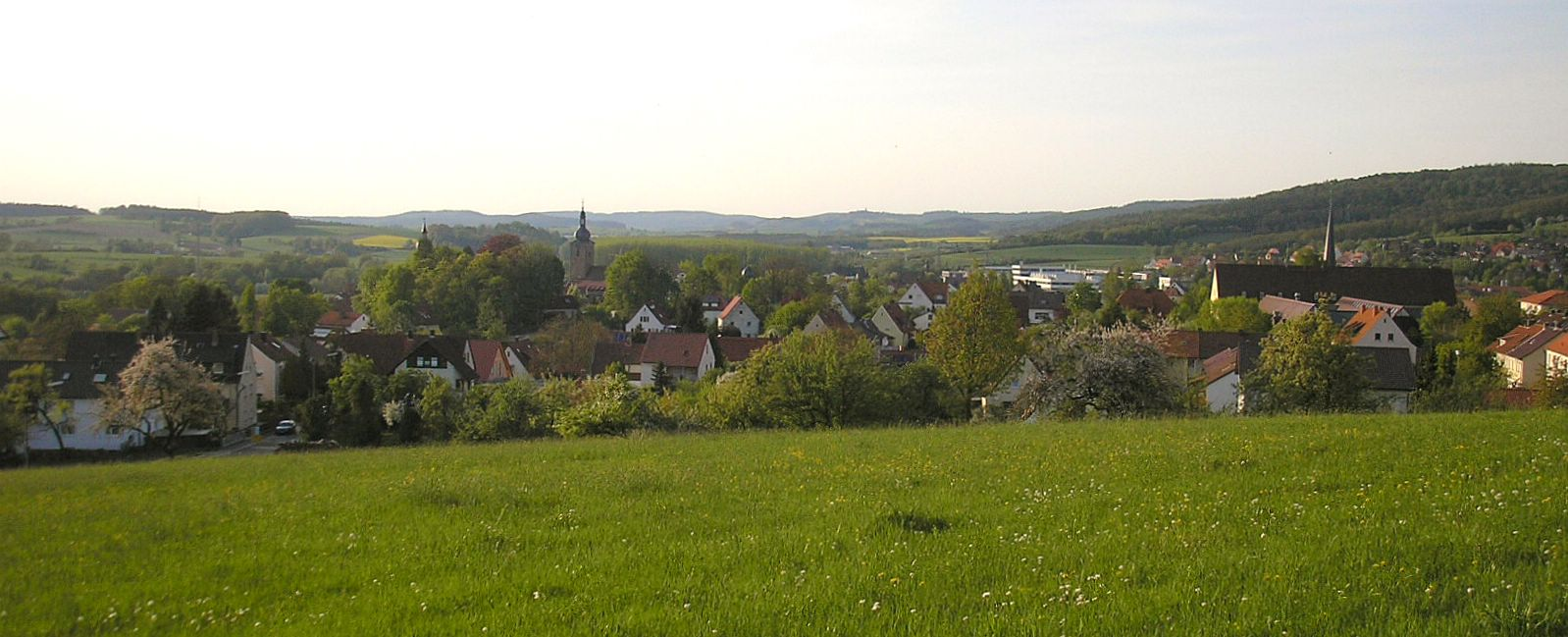
- Ebern seen from Losberg

- Coat of arms

- Location of Ebern within Haßberge district
- Interactive map of Ebern
- Location within Germany Location within Bavaria
- Coordinates: 50°6′0″N 10°47′37″E
- Country: Germany
- State: Bavaria
- Admin. region: Unterfranken
- District: Haßberge
- Municipal assoc.: Ebern
- Subdivisions: 18 Ortsteile

Government
  - Mayor (2020–26): Jürgen Hennemann (SPD)

Area
  - Total: 95.01 km^{2} (36.68 sq mi)
- Elevation: 273 m (896 ft)

Population (2025-12-31)
  - Total: 7,153
  - Density: 75.29/km^{2} (195.0/sq mi)
- Time zone: UTC+01:00 (CET)
  - Summer (DST): UTC+02:00 (CEST)
- Postal codes: 96106
- Dialling codes: 09531
- Vehicle registration: HAS, EBN,
- Website: www.ebern.de

Ebern (German pronunciation: [ˈeːbɐn]) is a town in the Haßberge district of Bavaria, Germany. It is situated 22 km (14 mi) southwest of Coburg and 23 km (14 mi) northwest of Bamberg. Its population is about 8,000. Its mayor is Robert Herrmann.

Ebern is about 1,000 years old and has an intact defensive wall. Its name derives from Eber, the German word for boar.

== Villages of Ebern ==
The borough of Ebern covers an area of 95 square kilometres (37 sq mi) within which are 18 villages as well as the town of Ebern itself.

- Albersdorf
- Bischwind a. Raueneck
- Bramberg
- Brünn
- Eichelberg
- Eyrichshof with Rotenhan, Kurzewind and Siegelfeld
- Fierst
- Fischbach
- Frickendorf
- Heubach
- Höchstädten
- Jesserndorf
- Neuses a. Raueneck
- Reutersbrunn
- Ruppach
- Unterpreppach
- Vorbach
- Weißenbrunn with Gemünd and Welkendorf

Besides the Schloss (castle) of Eyrichshof and the more modest manor house of Fischbach, Ebern has some interesting castle ruins: Bramberg Castle, Rotenhan Castle and Raueneck Castle.

== Founding legend ==
According to legend, one day two hunters were chasing a wild boar. It was finally struck by two spears, one from each of the hunters. They could not decide who threw the spear that killed the boar. The boar finally fell exactly on the border between Seßlach and Ebern, with its head in Ebern, and its body in Seßlach, so they divided it. Hence the town of Ebern is named after the boar, and the municipal flag displays a boar's head.

== Twin towns – sister cities ==
Ebern is twinned with:

- Strass im Zillertal, Austria
- Trun, France

== Notable people ==
- Ingrid Schubert (1944–1977), a founding member of the Red Army Faction

== Gallery ==
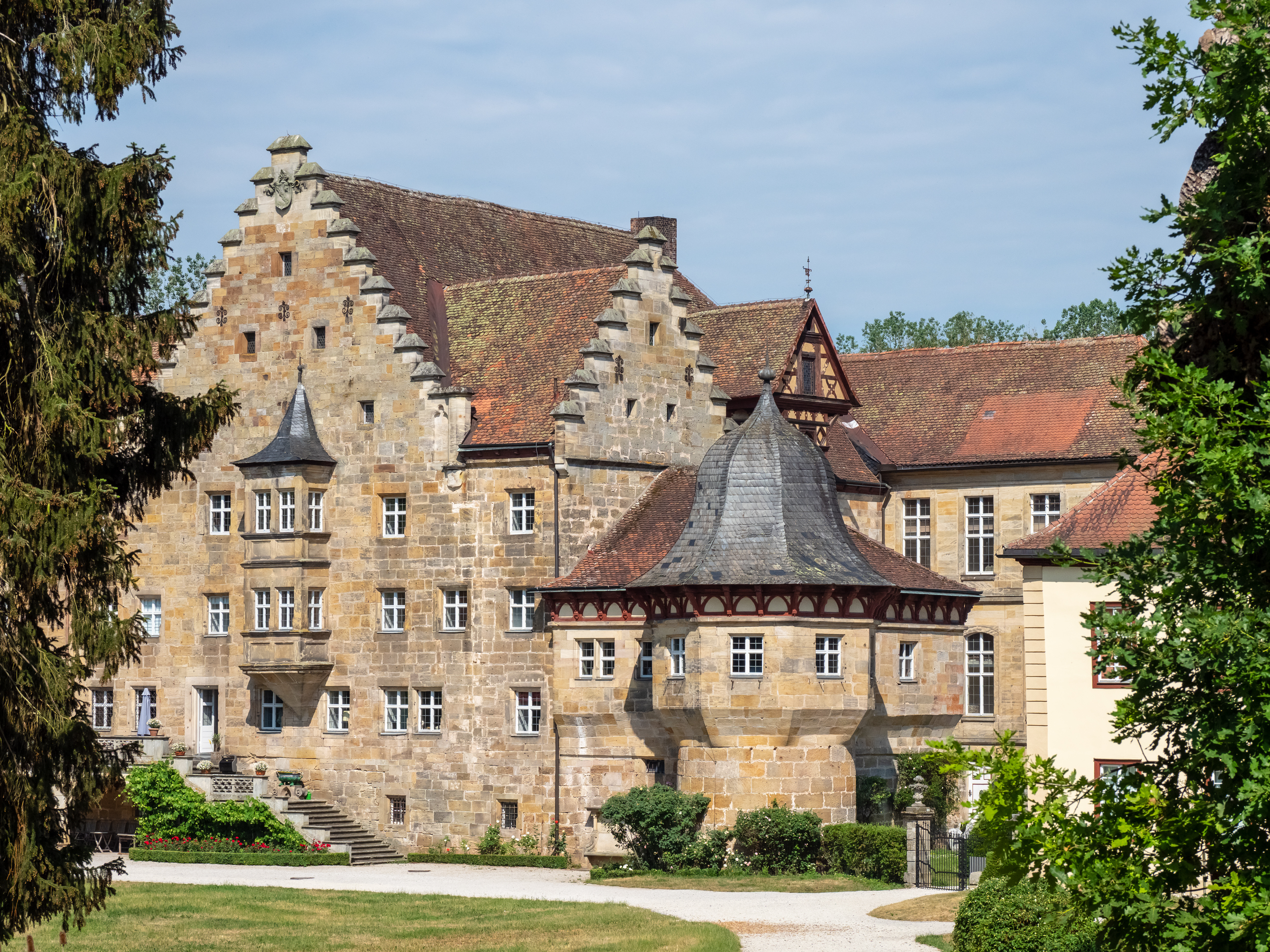
Schloss Eyrichshof

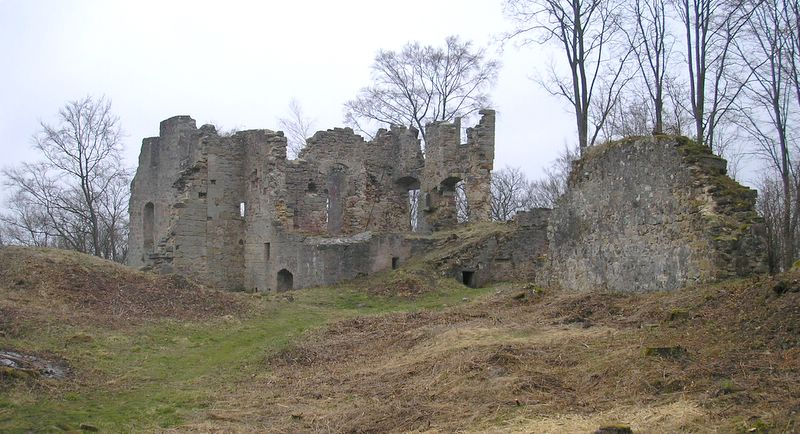
Ruins of Rauheneck Castle

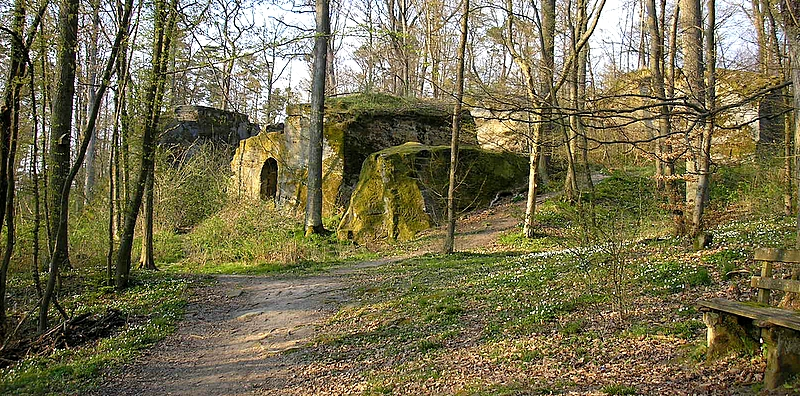
Ruins of Rotenhan

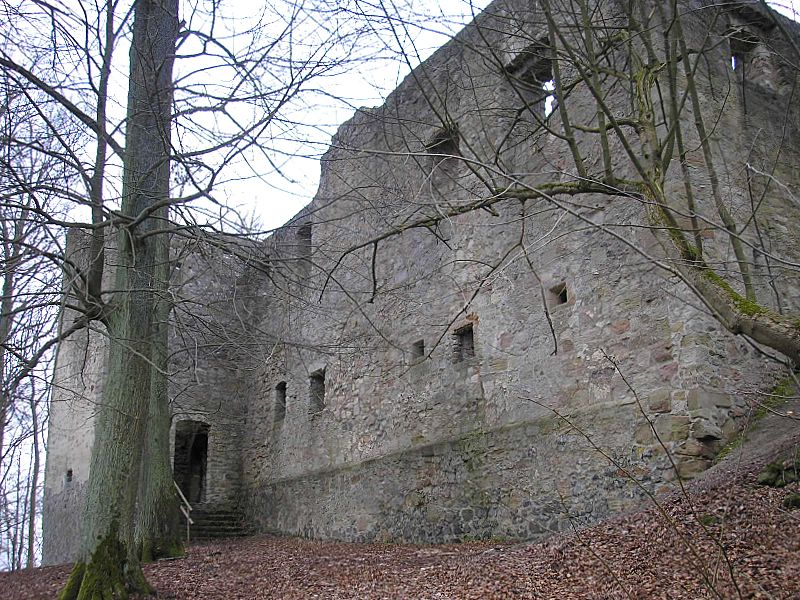
Ruins of Bramberg Castle
