= Ebrach Abbey =

Prison, formerly a Cistercian monastery, in Bavaria

- Kloster Ebrach
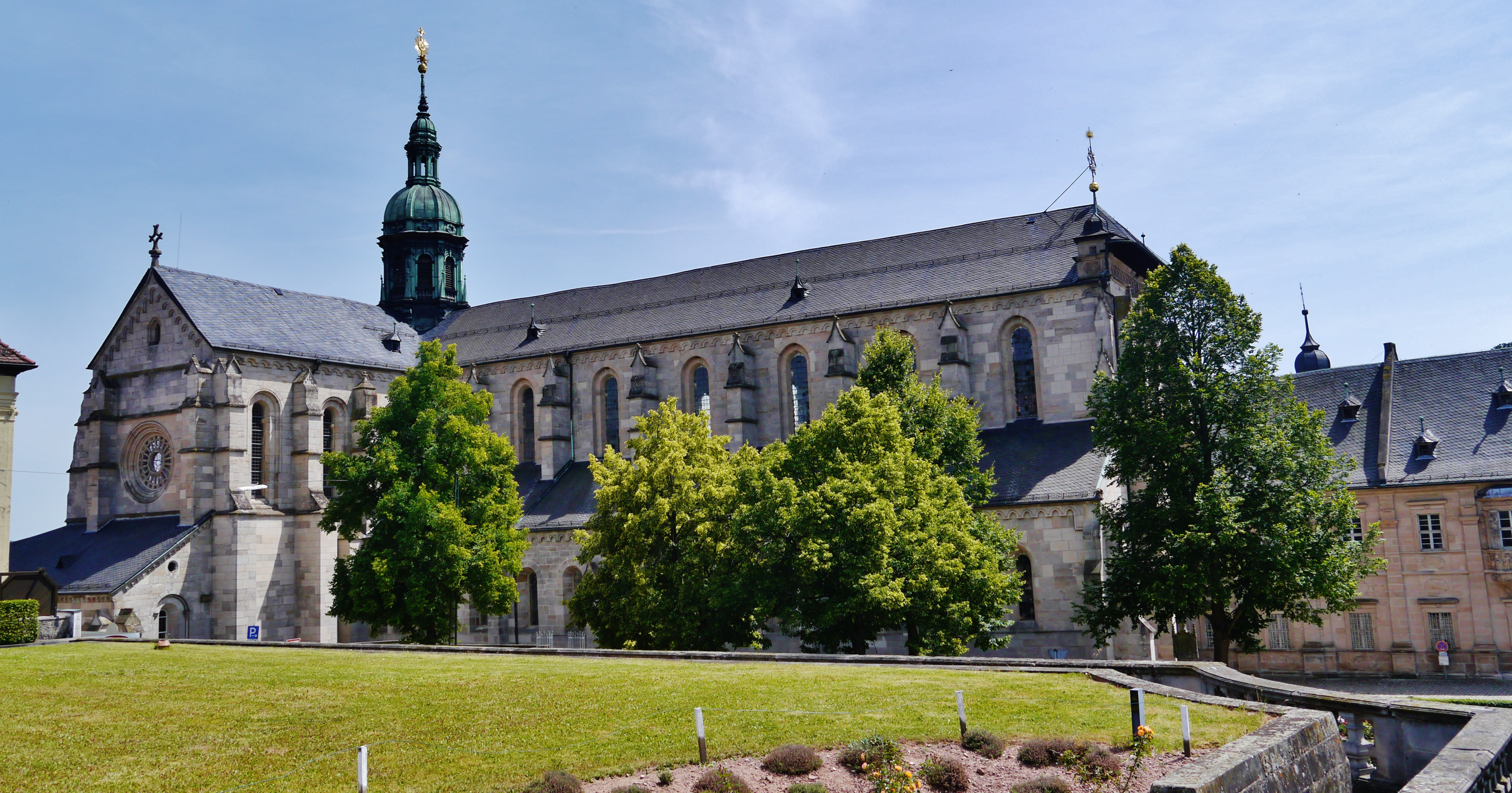
- Church of Ebrach Abbey

- Location within Bavaria Location within Germany

Monastery information
- Order: Cistercian
- Established: 12th century
- Disestablished: 1803
- Mother house: Morimond Abbey
- Dedication: Virgin Mary, John the Evangelist, Saint Nicholas
- Diocese: Würzburg

People
- Founder: Berno

Architecture
- Style: Gothic, interior mostly Baroque
- Groundbreaking: 1200
- Completed date: 1285

Site
- Location: Ebrach, Germany
- Coordinates: 49°50′49″N 10°29′39″E
- Public access: partial

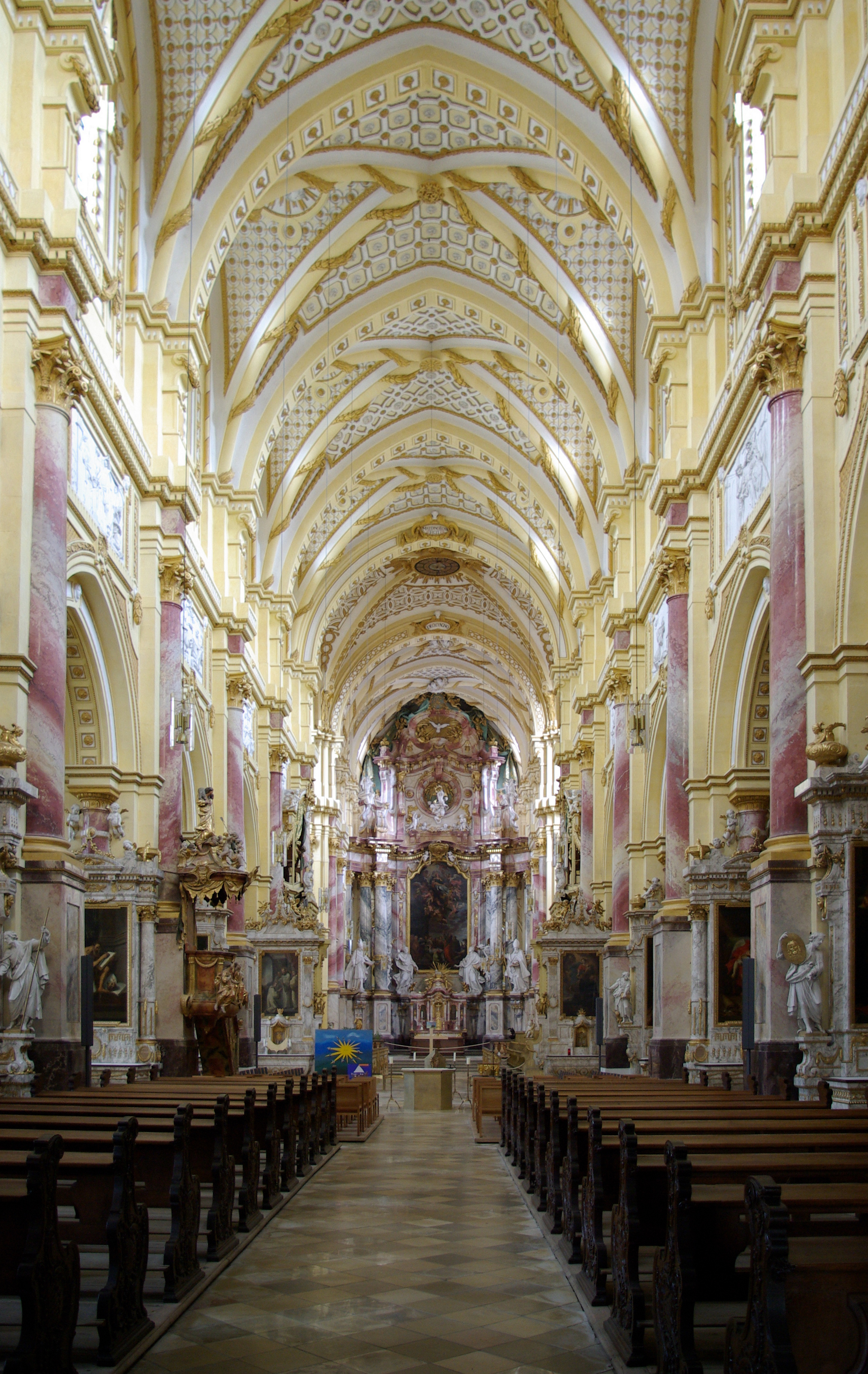
Former abbey church: nave with high altar

Ebrach Abbey (German: Kloster Ebrach) is a former Cistercian monastery in Ebrach in Oberfranken, Bavaria, Germany, and nowadays the site of a young offenders' institution.

== History ==
=== Abbey ===
The abbey, dedicated to the Virgin Mary, Saint John the Evangelist and Saint Nicholas, was founded in 1127, as the oldest house of the Cistercian order in Franconia. The founder, i.e. the provider of land, was a local noble named Berno. The involvement of other founders named in historic documents, such as King Konrad III, is doubtful. Berno's supposed siblings, Richwin and Berthrade, may also not have existed. The abbey was settled by twelve monks from Morimond Abbey in Burgundy, under the first abbot, Adam of Ebrach. The first church was dedicated in 1134, however, this was completely replaced later.

The monks were active in viticulture, forestry, and keeping sheep. The monastery became one of the wealthiest in Franconia.

Gertrude von Sulzbach, King Konrad's wife, was buried at the abbey upon her death in 1146.

Construction of today's church started in 1200 and was mostly completed in 1285. The final part of the main building to be finished was the west façade.

The abbey was dissolved during the secularisation in 1803. The abbey church became the local parish church.

=== Heart-burials of the Bishops of Würzburg ===
From the 13th century, heart burial was practiced with the hearts of the Bishops of Würzburg brought to Ebrach Abbey after their deaths; their entrails were despatched to the Marienkirche and their bodies to Würzburg Cathedral. About 30 hearts of bishops, some of which had been desecrated during the German Peasants' War, are said to have found their final resting place at Ebrach. The Prince-Bishop Julius Echter von Mespelbrunn (d. 1617) broke with this tradition and left instructions for his heart to be buried in the Neubaukirche.

=== Prison and contemporary use ===
Since 1851 part of the premises has served as a prison (Justizvollzugsanstalt Ebrach) and since 1958 as a young offenders' institution. The church is open to the public. A museum and some parts of the abbey buildings can still be visited on guided tours of the prison area.

== Description ==
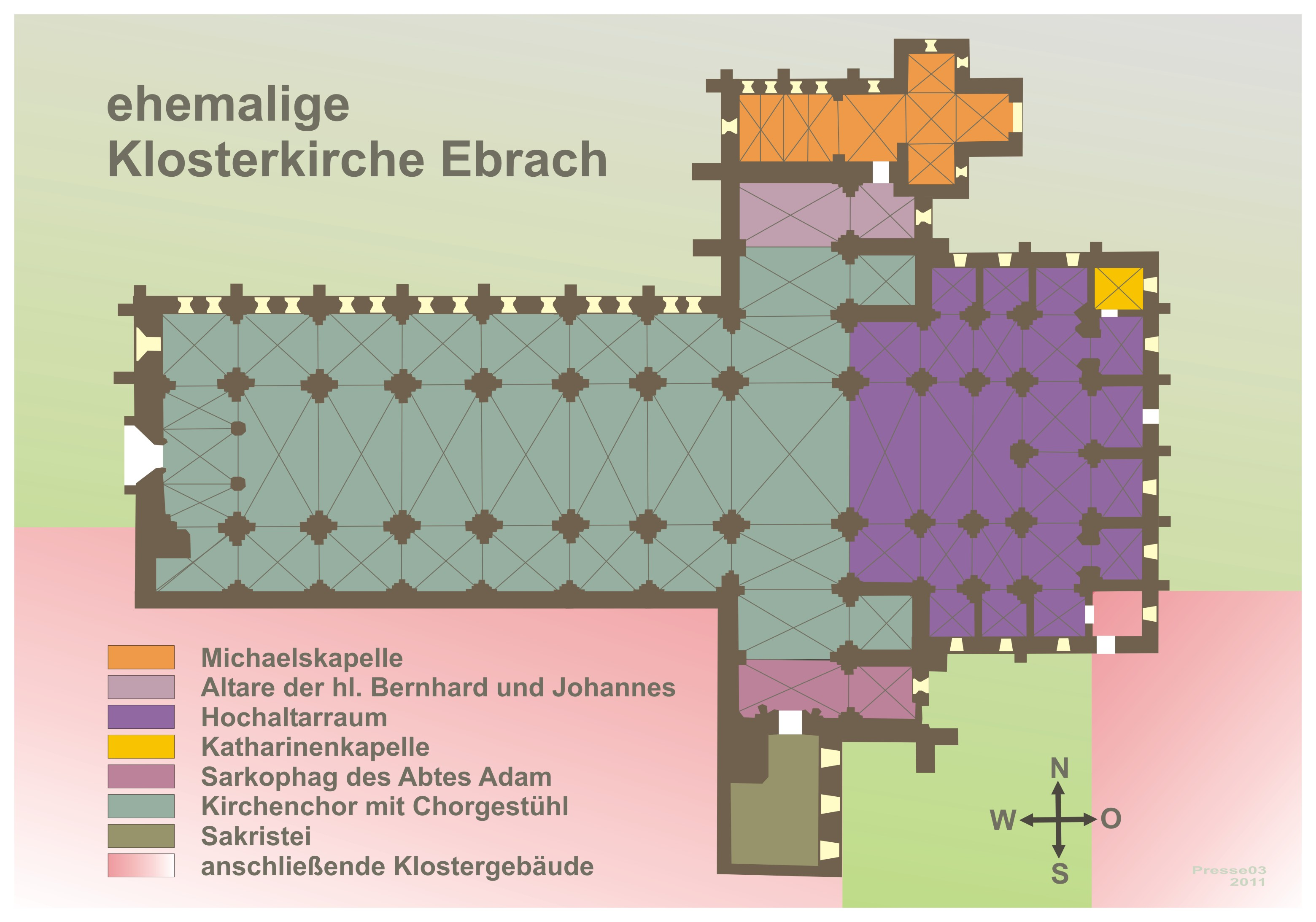
Map of the abbey church

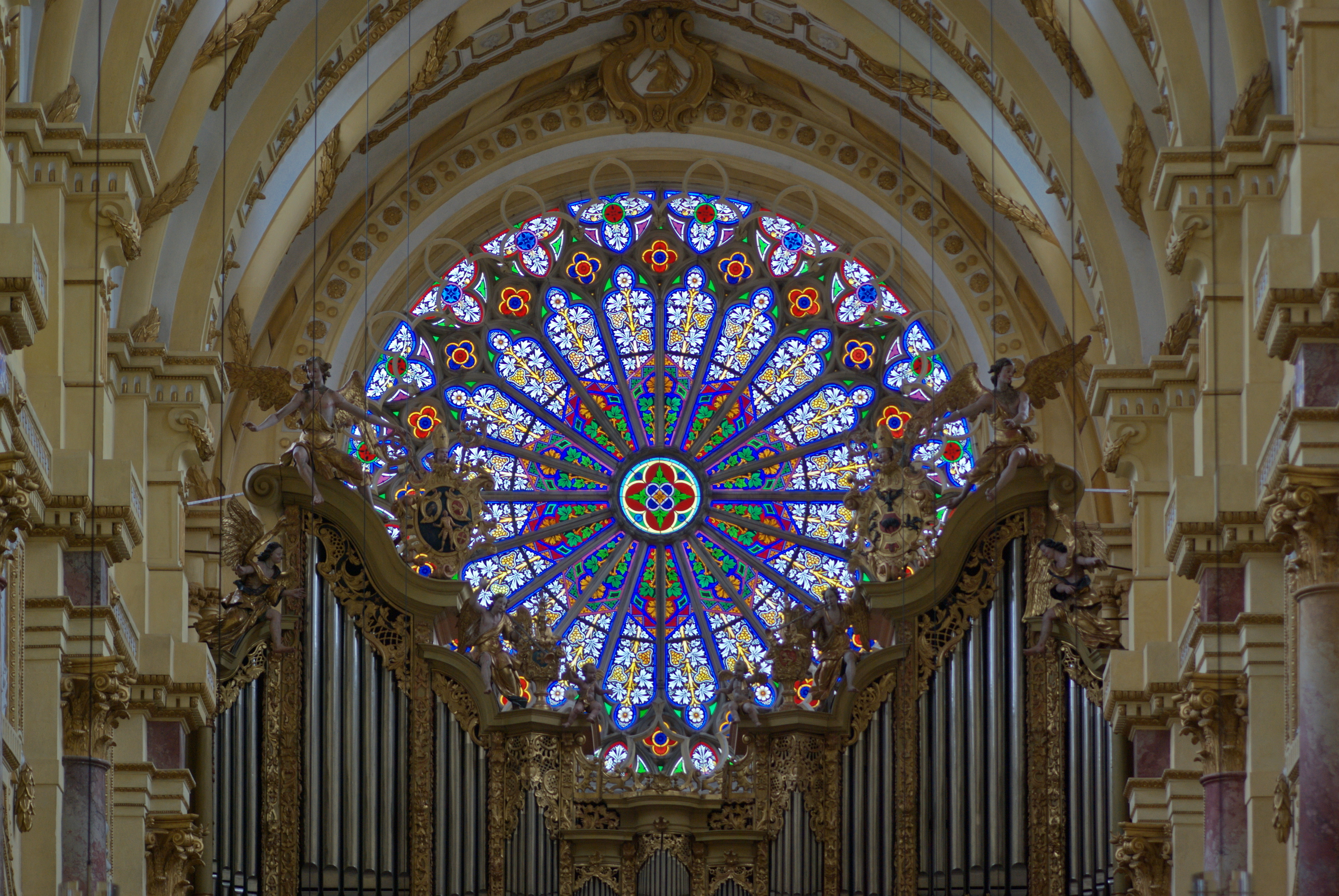
Rose window from inside

=== Church ===
Ebrach Abbey is a classical example of early Gothic Cistercian architecture. It is a three-aisled cruciform basilica. The transept ends in the east at four chapels, another twelve surround the choir. The exterior today mostly retains its original appearance (although a wooden tower was added in 1716), but the interior was significantly changed in the 18th century.

The late 13th-century west façade features a Gothic portal flanked by statues of the patrons Mary and John the Evangelist, added in 1648/9. Above the portal is a large rose window (ca. 1280), with a diameter of 7.6 meters, inspired by the north window of Notre-Dame de Paris. The original window is today in the Bavarian National Museum, but the replica is a very close copy.

The interior of the church was changed in the later 18th century, in French Neoclassical style. Materno Bossi created the stucco designs. He added Corithian columns, a Neoclassical sill and covered the Gothic vaulting rib with stucco garlands. Walls and ceiling were covered by white and yellow stucco. Stucco reliefs show scenes from the life of Jesus (nave) and from the life of Bernard of Clairvaux (choir). Oil paintings on the walls of the side aisles show saints or beatified members of the Cistercian order.

The altars were made by Bossi from stucco resembling marble. The statues adorning them were made by Johann Peter Alexander Wagner. The towering high altar features a 17th-century painting showing the Assumption of Mary, based on an earlier picture by Peter Paul Rubens. The tabernacle shows figures of Saint Peter, John the Evangelist, Bernard of Clairvaux and Edmund of Canterbury by Wagner.

The choir contains stalls carved with wood and alabaster scenes from the life of Jesus. Above the stalls, both sides are occupied by the organ. The Rococo wrought-iron lattice that once divided the choir from the nave (made in 1743 by Marx Gattinger) was dismantled after the church was transformed into a parish church and the central piece was reinstalled beneath the organ gallery at the church entrance. This gallery dates from 1704 and the organ, by J. Ph. Seuffert, was added in 1743 (Rococo carvings by A. Gutmann).

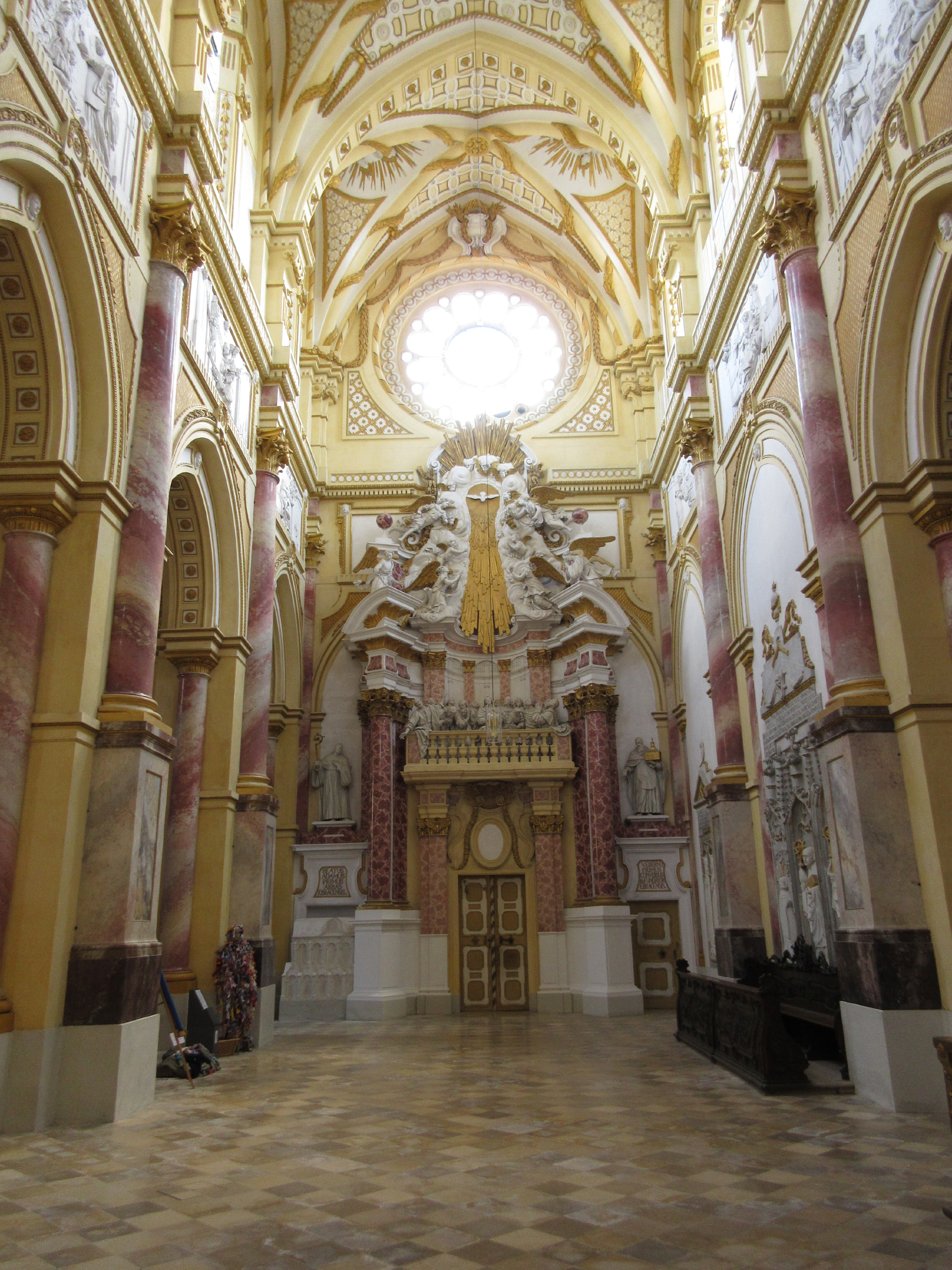
Southern end of the transept with Pentecost sculptures and fake door incorporating the entrance to the sacristy

The southern transept features a sculpture group of the Pentecost (1696, by G. B. Brenno) above a false door, flanked by statues of the founder, Berno, and the first abbot, Adam. The stucco mausoleum is a mix of Renaissance and Gothic styles.

Access to the ring of chapels is via stucco-marble archways by Daniel Friedrich Humbach (1741), showing Saint Nepomuk (south) and Jesus with the Fourteen Helpers (north). The chapels still contain early Baroque altars or - in the case of the Katharinenkapelle - A Renaissance altar. At the back of the high altar are the burial monuments for Gertrud and her son Friedrich von Schwaben. These were created after 1600 based on earlier pieces. This is also true of the epitaphs for the Bishops of Würzburg Berthold II. von Sternberg and Manegold von Neuenburg. In the north wall are the niches for the hearts of the Würzburg bishops. Due to the sacking of the abbey in the German Peasants War, most of them were destroyed or lost. However, the hearts of Melchior Zobel von Giebelstadt and Friedrich von Wirsberg are still there.

In the northern transept stands a Renaissance altar made from sandstone and alabaster dedicated to Bernard of Clairvaux, created in 1625/6 by Veit Dümpel. To the right of this altar is the entrance to the Michaeliskapelle with three altars dedicated in 1207 that survived the redecoration of the church. The chapel combines late Romanesque and early Gothic features. Since the axis of this chapel and the crypt below are not aligned with the rest of the church, these may be the oldest parts of the structure, begun before the plan for the overall basilica was finished.

=== Monastic buildings ===
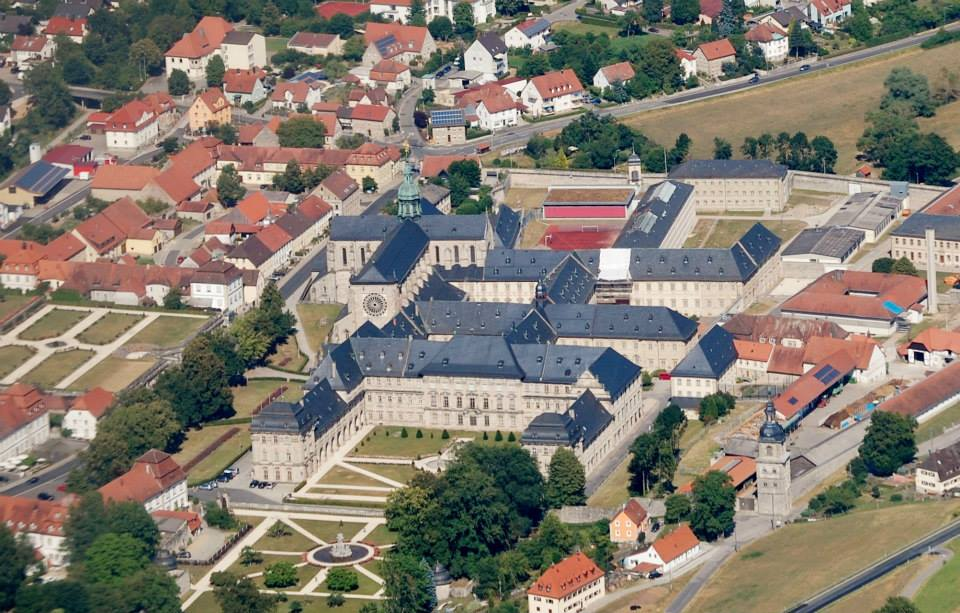
Aerial view of the abbey

The Baroque abbey buildings were built in two phases (1687–98 and 1715–35), grouped around two enclosed and three open courtyards. The two main façades, the northern of the Abteibau and the western of the Festssaalbau face a Cour d'honneur. The earlier tract was planned and built by Leonhard Dientzenhofer (eastern wings and two-storied north façade) in early Baroque style, out of gray/white sandstone. After Dientzenhofer's death construction paused until J. Greising built the Empfangsbau in 1716. He later, based on plans revised by Balthasar Neumann, constructed the western front of the large cour d'honneur and built the Festsaalbau at its eastern end. Neumann also was responsible for the stairway of the Empfangsbau, based on a design at Schloss Weißenstein. The statues of the stairway were made by Balthasar Esterbauer, other sculptures by Daniel Humbach. Stucco work was done by G. Hennicke and the ceiling fresco by J.A. Remele (1712–22). The Kaisersaal also features stucco by Hennicke, surrounding a central ceiling painting of "The triumph of the lamb" by Clemens Lünenschloss.

=== Park ===
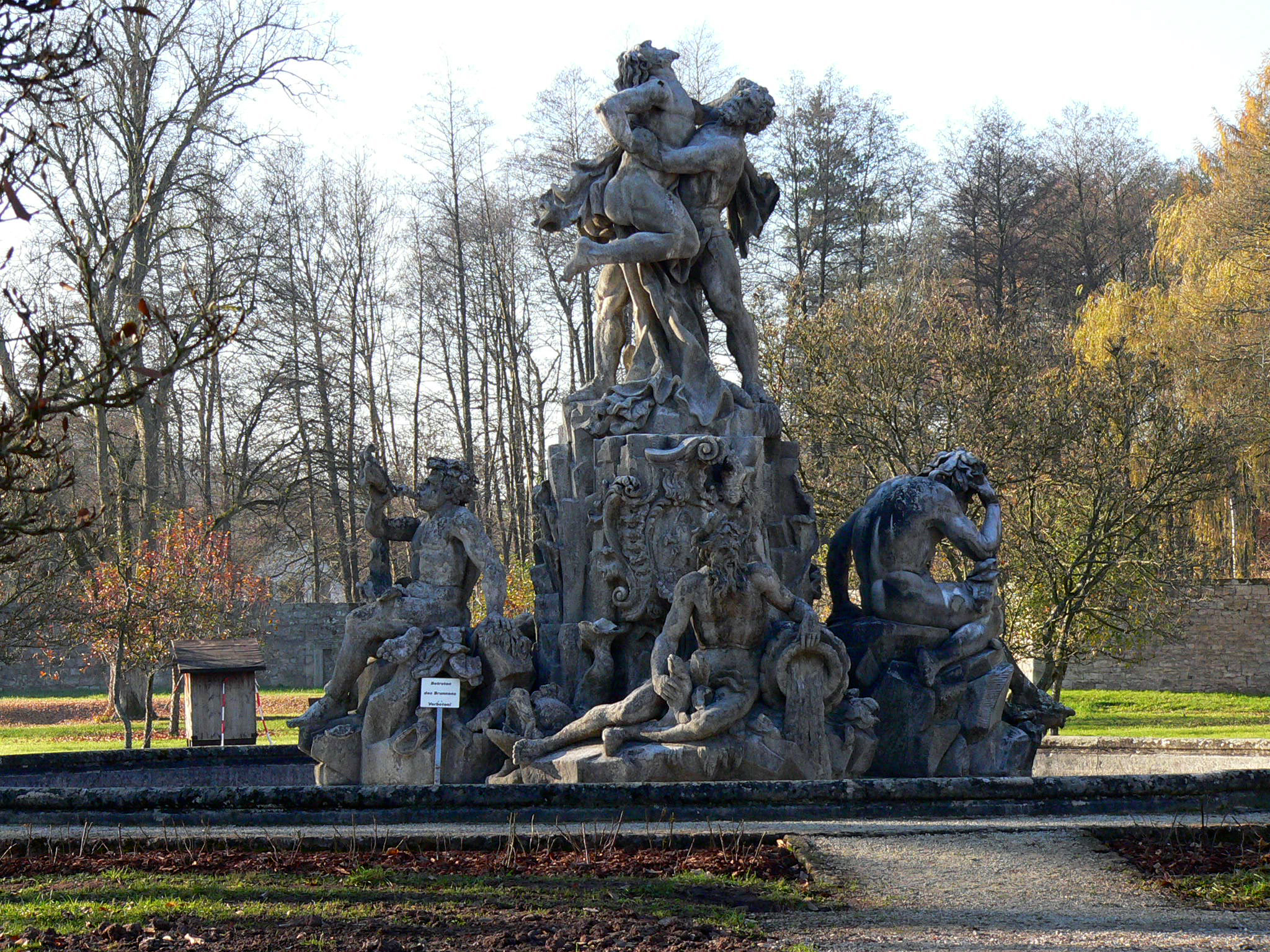
Heracles fountain

The parks were significantly changed in the 19th century. The large fountain by W. van der Auvera, showing Heracles and Antaeus (1747). A guard tower to the south west was planned by Balthasar Neumann. To the northwest and north there are administrative buildings and a terrace with an orangerie. In the past gates around the square were locked at night. The Bamberger Tor still remains.

== Gallery ==
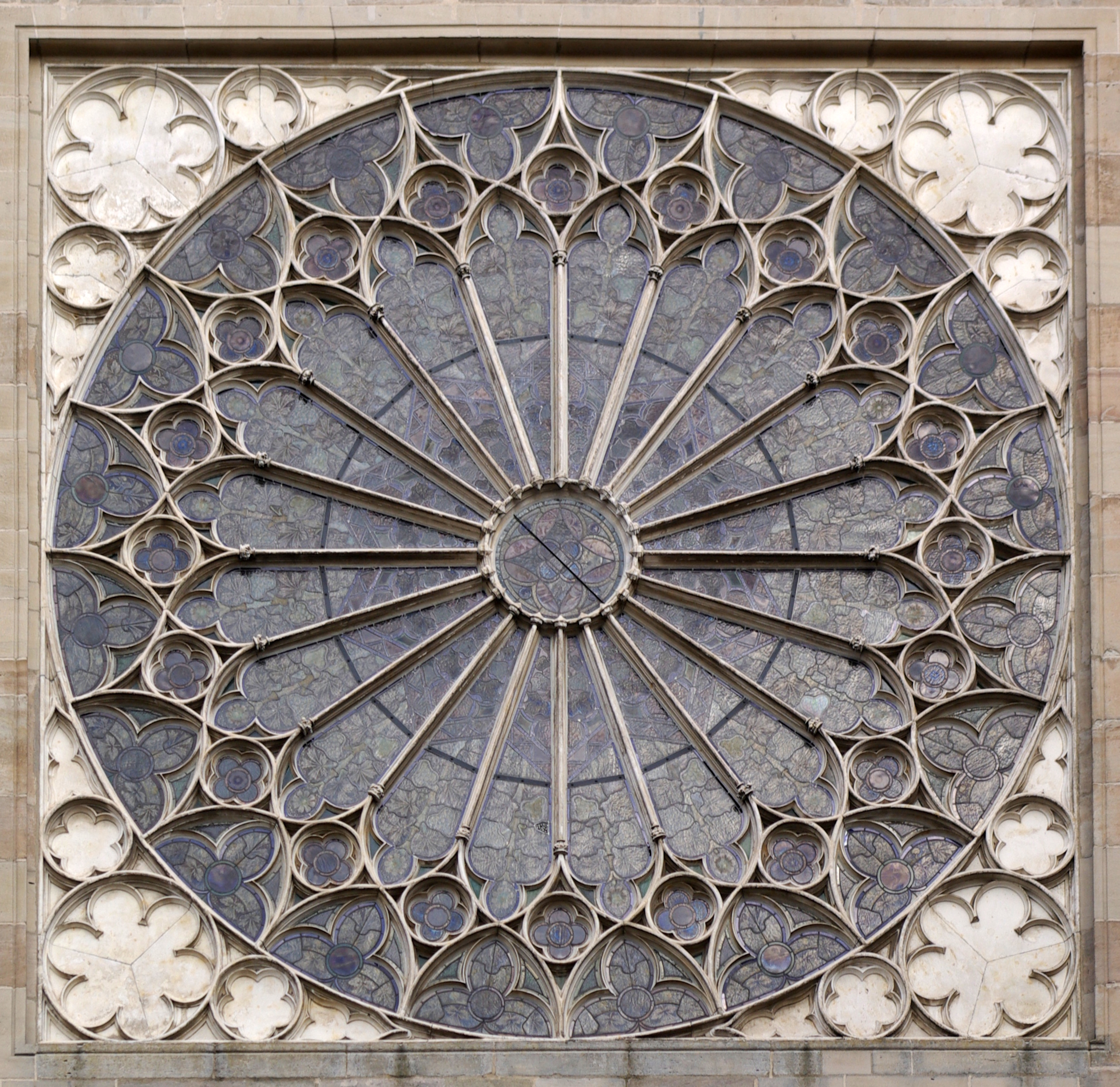
Rose window exterior

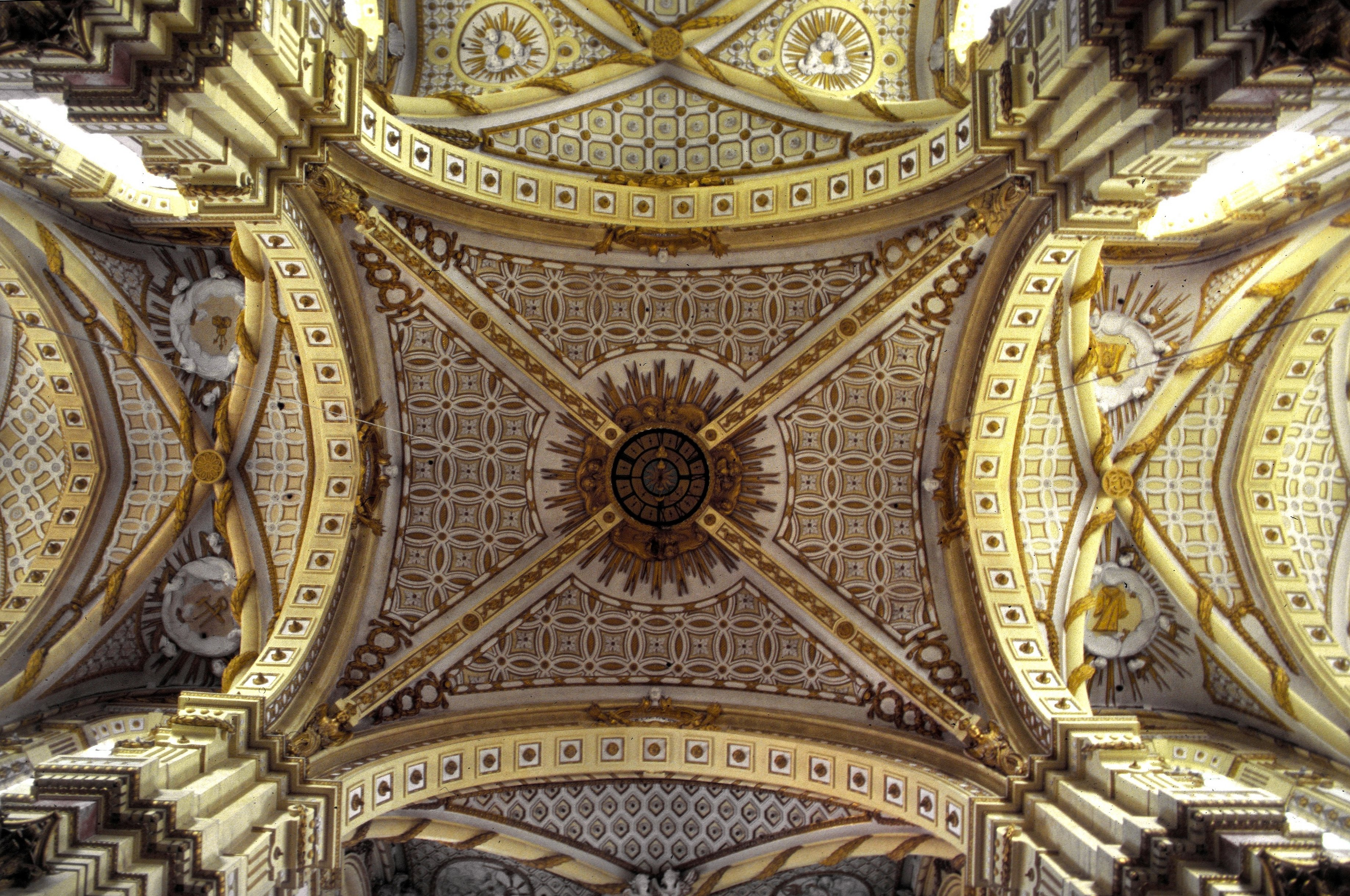
Detail of ceiling vault at crossing

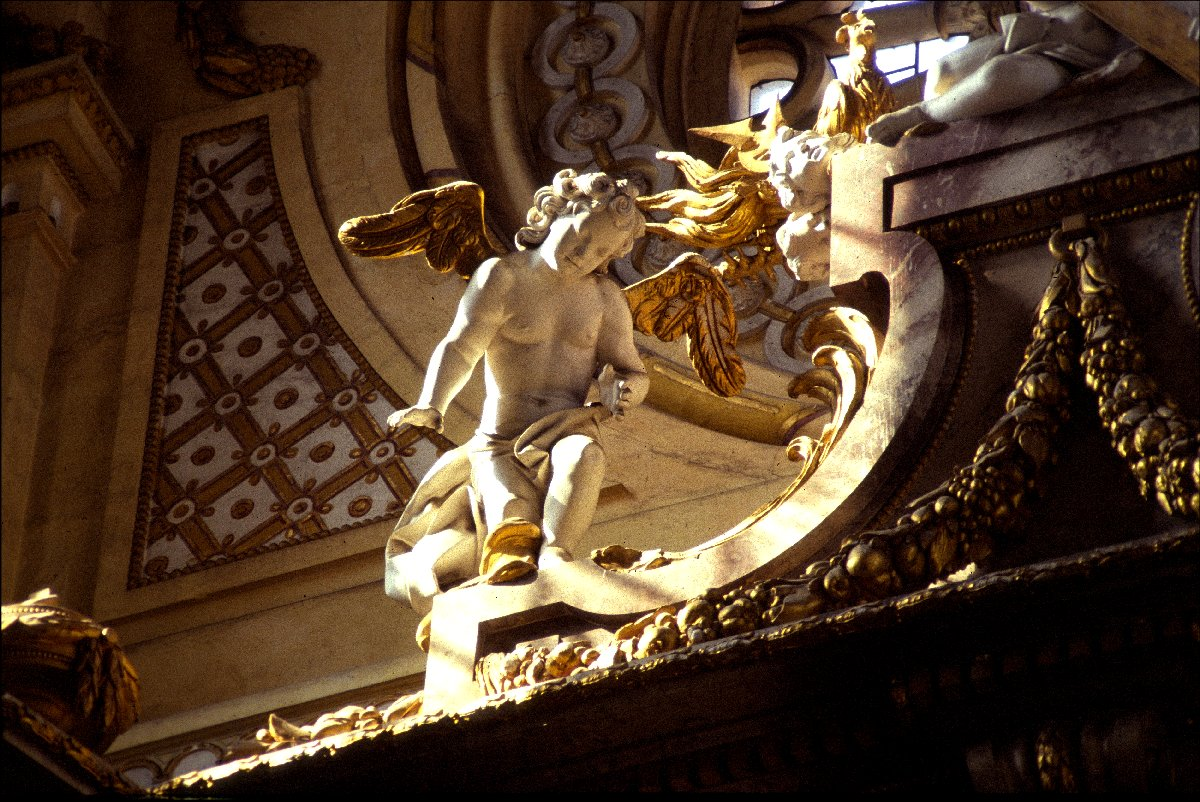
Angel figure

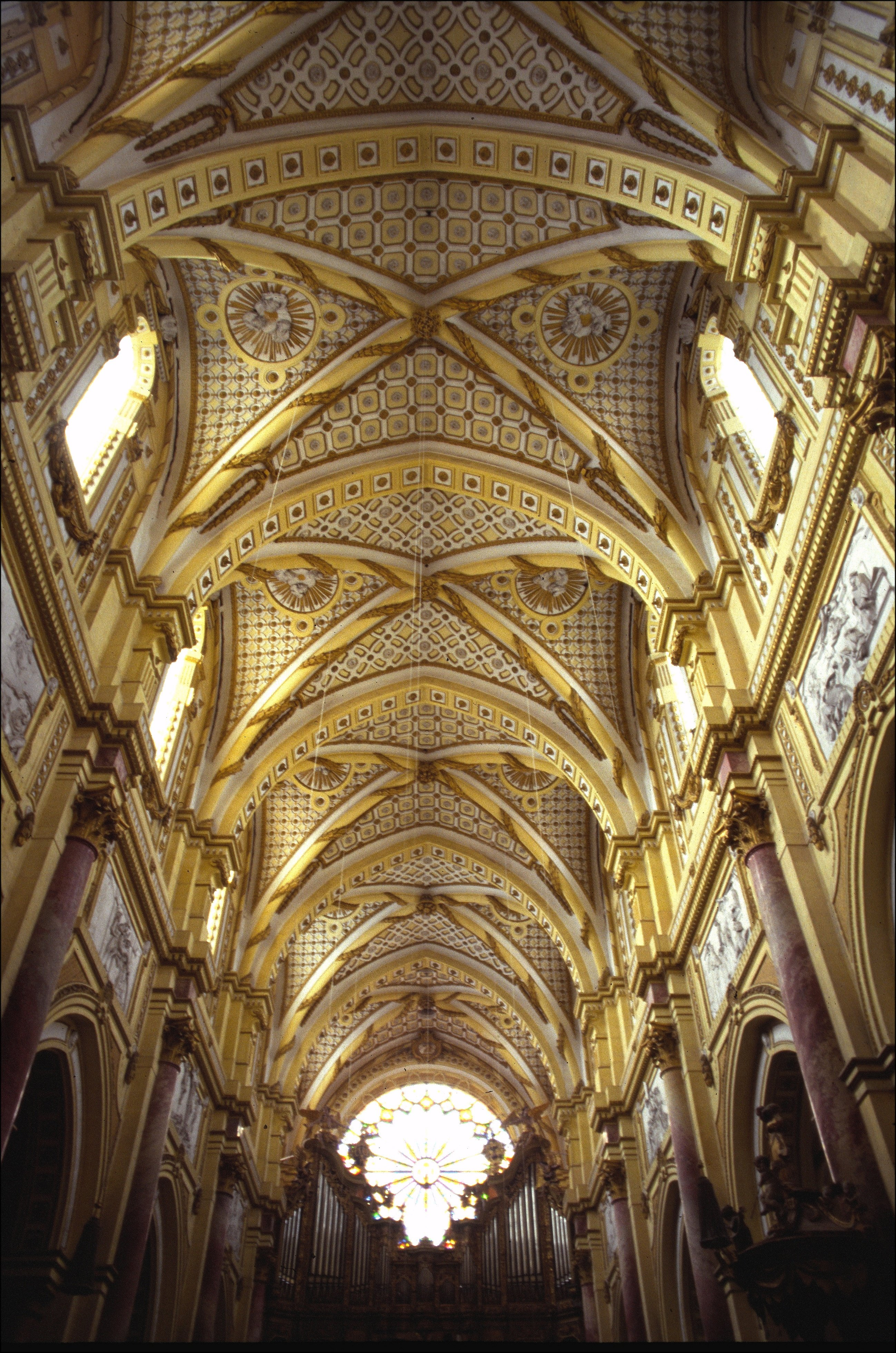
Ceiling
