= Adam of Ebrach =

12th-century Cistercian abbot

Adam of Ebrach (late 11th century – 23 November 1167) was a Cistercian monk and the first abbot of Ebrach Abbey in the area of Bamberg, Bavaria, Germany. He later became the founding abbot of Langheim Abbey.

== Biography ==
Adam, originating from Cologne, is first recorded when entering the Cistercian monastery of Morimond Abbey in Burgundy. He is probably the monk Adam, who belonged to a group led by Abbot Arnold the German, who left Morimond Monastery in 1124 to found a new monastery in the Holy Land. After Abbot Arnold's death on January 3, 1126 Bernhard of Clairvaux wrote to Adam asking him to return to Morimond. The confidence with which Bernard assumed that the rest of the monks would follow Adam points to Adam's gift of leadership.

In 1127, he led twelve monks to Franconia to settle the monastery of Ebrach, newly founded by local Frankish nobles Berno and Richwin von Eberau. Berno was an important retainer of the Würzburg prince-bishop Embricho. The first church was dedicated in 1134 by Bishop Emicho.

Adam seems to have led the monastery with great success, so that six daughter monasteries were founded with his influence, in Franconia, Styria and Lower Bavaria:in 1129 in Rein, the oldest Cistercian monastery in the world that still exists today, in 1132 in Heilsbronn and in Langheim, in 1145 at Nepomuk, in 1146 the monastery of Aldersbach near Passau and in 1156 the monastery of Bildhausen near Münnerstadt in Bavaria. As abbot, he made yearly visits to the monasteries founded from Ebrach. He would also travel to the order's annual General Chapter at Cîteaux.

Three brothers from the city of Bamberg made a gift of the estate of Langheim to Otto I, bishop of Bamberg, who in 1132 offered it to Adam on condition that it should be used for the establishment of a new monastery of the order. The first stone was laid on 1 August 1132. The abbey, like Ebrach, was dedicated to the Virgin Mary, Saint John the Evangelist and Saint Nicholas. The first abbot was Adam, who succeeded in gaining the support not only of the bishops of Bamberg but of the local nobility.

Adam was a close friend of Bernard of Clairvaux, and maintained contact with Hildegard of Bingen and theologian Gerhoh von Reichersberg, provost of Reichersberg Abbey. He also had a major role in the mobilisation for the Second Crusade. He was well received at the court of Conrad III, whose wife, Gertrude of Sulzbach, and their young son, Friedrich von Rothenburg, were buried at Ebrach Abbey. Adam was also held in esteem by the pope and by Emperor Frederick I. The latter added him to his first delegation to Pope Eugenius III, referring to him as the man of my trust, in ecclesiastic and worldly things. However, when Barbarossa later backed the Antipope Victor IV, he lost Adam's support.

Adam's remains rest in the mausoleum of the abbey church in Ebrach.

== See also ==
- Catholic Church in Germany

== Sources ==
- Allgemeine Deutsche Biographie – online version at Wikisource
