= Haßberge (disambiguation) =

Haßberge may refer to:

- Haßberge, a chain of hills the district is named after
- Haßberge (district), a district in Bavaria, Germany
- Haßberge Nature Park, a park in the area
