= Zeilberg =

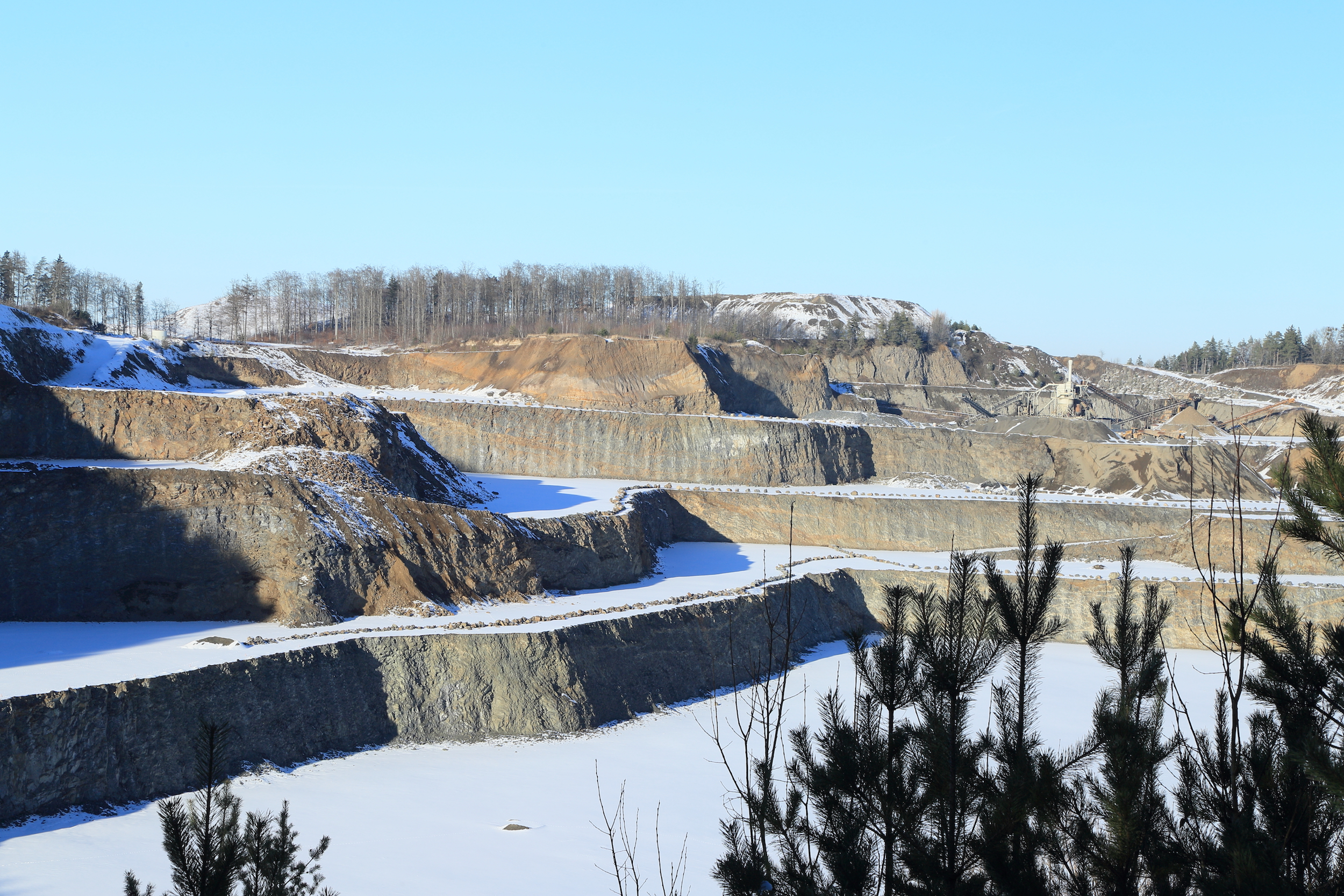
- Zeilberg in 2017.

Highest point
- Elevation: 462.9 m above sea level (NHN) (1,519 ft)
- Coordinates: 50°11′48″N 10°41′18″E

Geography
- Location within Bavaria
- Location: Haßberge Nature Park, Bavaria, Germany
- Parent range: Zeilberge, Itz-Baunach Hills

Geology
- Rock age: 16 MYA
- Mountain type: volcano

The Zeilberg is a hill, 463 m above NHN, in the Haßberge Nature Park and county of Haßberge in eastern Lower Franconia, about 2 kilometres (1.2 mi) east of Maroldsweisach. It is one of the few still recognisable volcanoes of the Heldburger Gangschar and gives its name to the Zeilberge, which are the highest part of the Itz-Baunach Hills that are geologically part of the actual Haßberge to the west, but are separated from them by the Baunach valley.

The extinct volcano is 16 million years old and is formed of nephelinite. It has been reduced in height due to extraction from a basalt quarry.

== Tourism ==
An adventure trail runs around the basalt quarry. The Haus am Zeilberg is also a popular venue for events.
