= Neuenstein =

Neuenstein may refer to:

- Neuenstein, Baden-Württemberg
- Neuenstein, Hesse, a community in Hersfeld-Rotenburg district in northeastern Hesse, Germany
- Hohenlohe-Neuenstein, a German princely dynasty
- Philip of Hohenlohe-Neuenstein (1550–1606), army commander for Dutch Republic
- Georg Friedrich of Hohenlohe-Neuenstein-Weikersheim (1569–1645), officer and amateur poet

== See also ==
- Joshua Neustein (born 1940)
- Altenstein (disambiguation)
