= Altenstein =

Altenstein (German for "Old Rock" or "Old Stone") may refer to:

== Places in Germany ==
=== Villages and administrative areas ===
- Amt Altenstein, an Amt in the Duchy of Saxe-Meiningen
- Altenstein, village in the municipality of Asbach, Rhineland-Palatinate, Germany
- Altenstein, village in the municipality of Häg-Ehrsberg in the county of Lörrach, Baden-Württemberg, Germany
- Altenstein, village in the market town of Maroldsweisach, county of Haßberge, Bavaria

=== Castles ===
- Altenstein Castle (Bad Liebenstein), historical castle site near Schweina and Bad Liebenstein, Wartburgkreis, Thuringia
- Altenstein Castle (Southern Black Forest), lost castle near Häg-Ehrsberg, Lörrach, Baden-Württemberg
- Altenstein Castle (Lower Franconia), castle ruins in Altenstein between Ebern and Maroldsweisach, Haßberge, Bavaria
- Altenstein Castle (Eichsfeld) in the vicinity of Asbach-Sickenberg near Bad Sooden-Allendorf, Eichsfeld, Thuringia
- Alte Burg (Altenstein), early medieval ringwork between Altenstein and Lichtenstein, Maroldsweisach, Haßberge, Bavaria
- Ringwall Altenstein, lost castle near Taunusstein-Hahn, Rheingau-Taunus-Kreis, Hesse

=== Other places in Germany ===
- Altenstein (Bad Liebenstein), a quarter of Bad Liebenstein in Wartburgkreis, Thuringia, Germany, with the:
  - Altensteiner Park
  - Altenstein Palace

== Other places ==
- Altenstein (Namibia), a municipality in Namibia

== People ==
- Bernd Altenstein (born 1943), German sculptor
- Karl vom Stein zum Altenstein (1770−1840), Prussian politician
