= Haßberge Hills =

Hill range in Germany

Haßberge
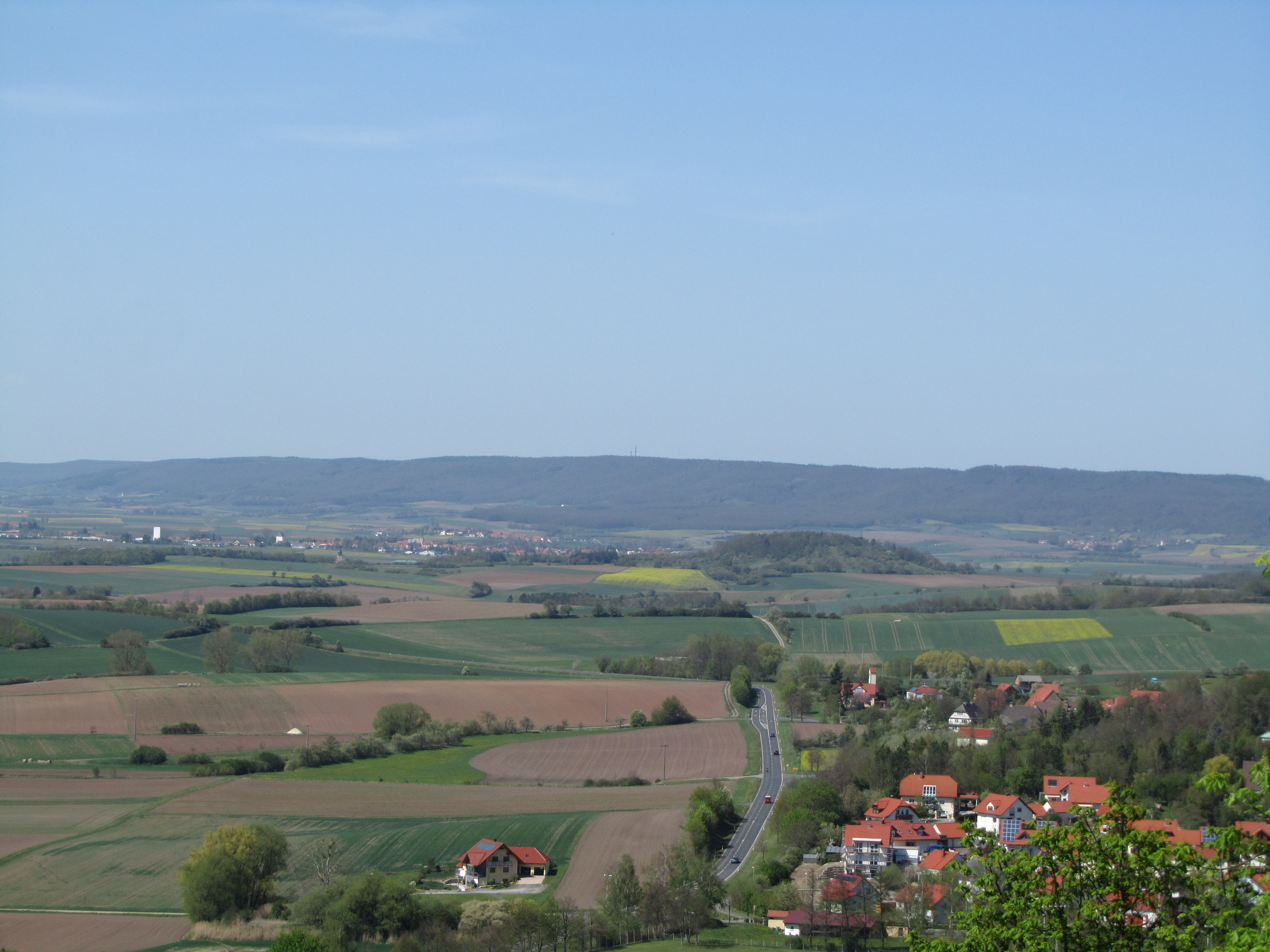
- The Haßberge including their highest summit, the Nassacher Höhe (centre)

Highest point
- Peak: Nassacher Höhe
- Elevation: 512.2 m above NN

Geography
- Location within Bavaria
- State(s): Bavaria, Germany
- Range coordinates: 50°11′15″N 10°29′31″E

The Haßberge (German pronunciation: [ˈhasbɛʁɡə]; alternative spelling: Hassberge) are a hill range, up to 512.2 m above sea level (NN), north of the river Main in Lower Franconia in the German state of Bavaria. The hills are in the county of Bamberg and divided by the Main valley from their sister hills, the Steigerwald. Both forested hill ranges fall steeply down to the Main. Between the Ebelsbach and Haßfurt the river cuts through the hills in a wide gap, creating an easy route between the Upper Main and the fertile Middle Main region.

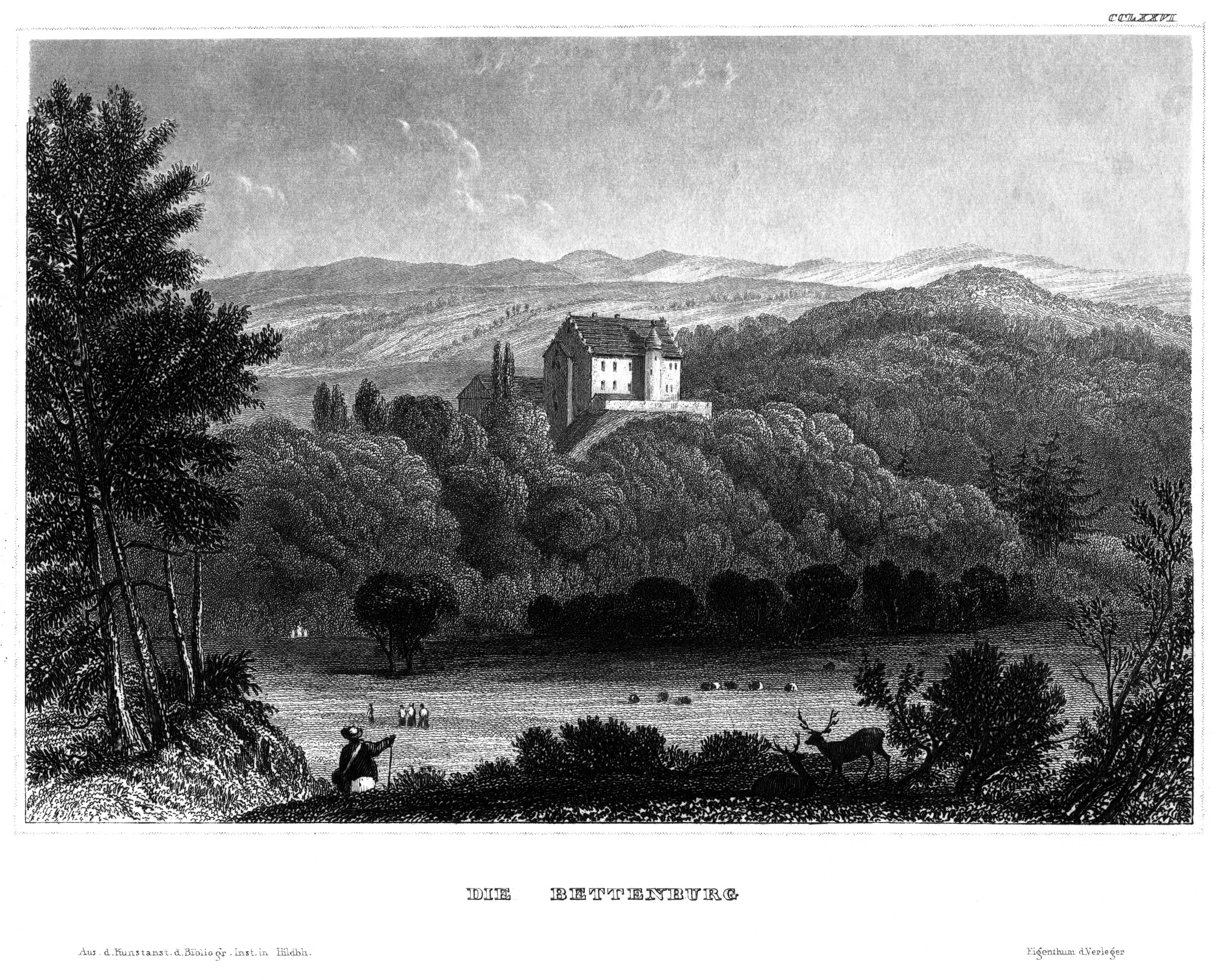
A symbol of the Haßberge: the Bettenburg near Hofheim (19th century steel engraving)

The Haßberge are a central part of the Haßberge Nature Park, whose extensive mixed forest is criss-crossed by numerous footpaths. The nature park reaches from the former Inner German Border near Bad Königshofen to the Main near Hallstadt. On the far side of the Main is the Steigerwald Nature Park.

The Haßberge region not only covers the actual, clearly defined hills, but also their western foreland and parts of the Itz-Baunach hills or Zeilberge to the east.

The region is unusually rich in historic castles and palaces, of which over 40 survive either as ruins or are still lived in. Several once heavily fortified towns at the edge of the range still have historic centres.

Haßberge Park and the modern county of Haßberge are named after the hills.

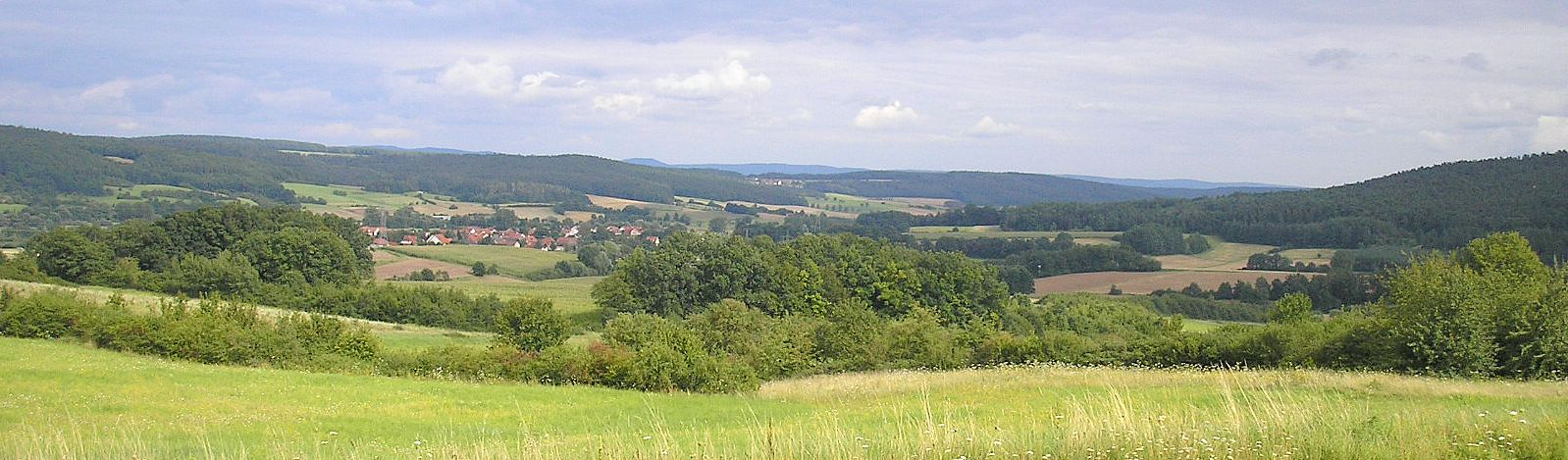
Typical Haßberg countryside near Ebern. View from the old training area looking south to the Zeilberge hills. The Franconian Jura may be seen in the background

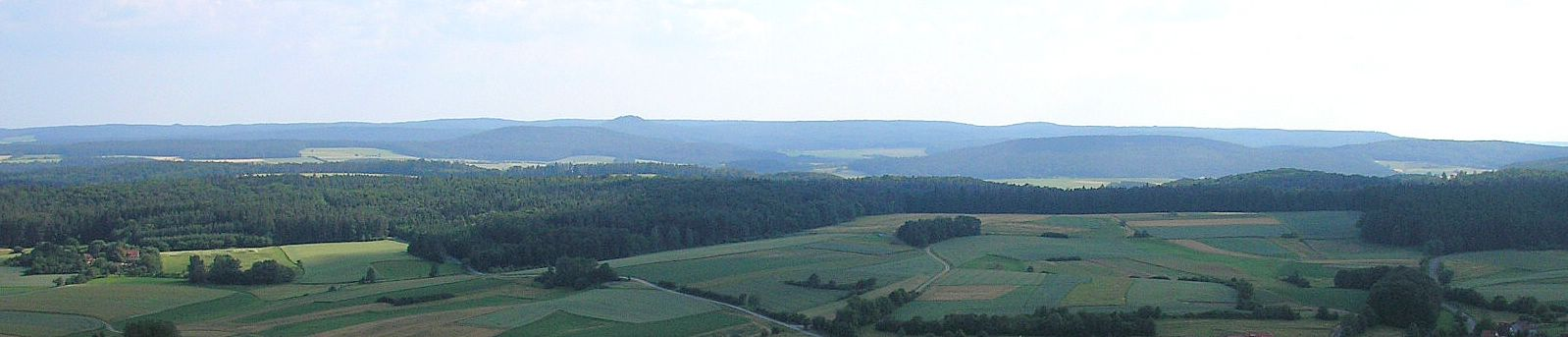
The rolling hills of the Haßberge from the eastern hillside of the Zeilberge near Maroldsweisach. Centre left: the prominent volcanic cone of the Bramberg

== See also ==
- Alte Burg (Altenstein), the "Old Castle" at Altenstein
