= Brennhausen =

Coordinates: 50°14′50.7″N 10°31′19″E

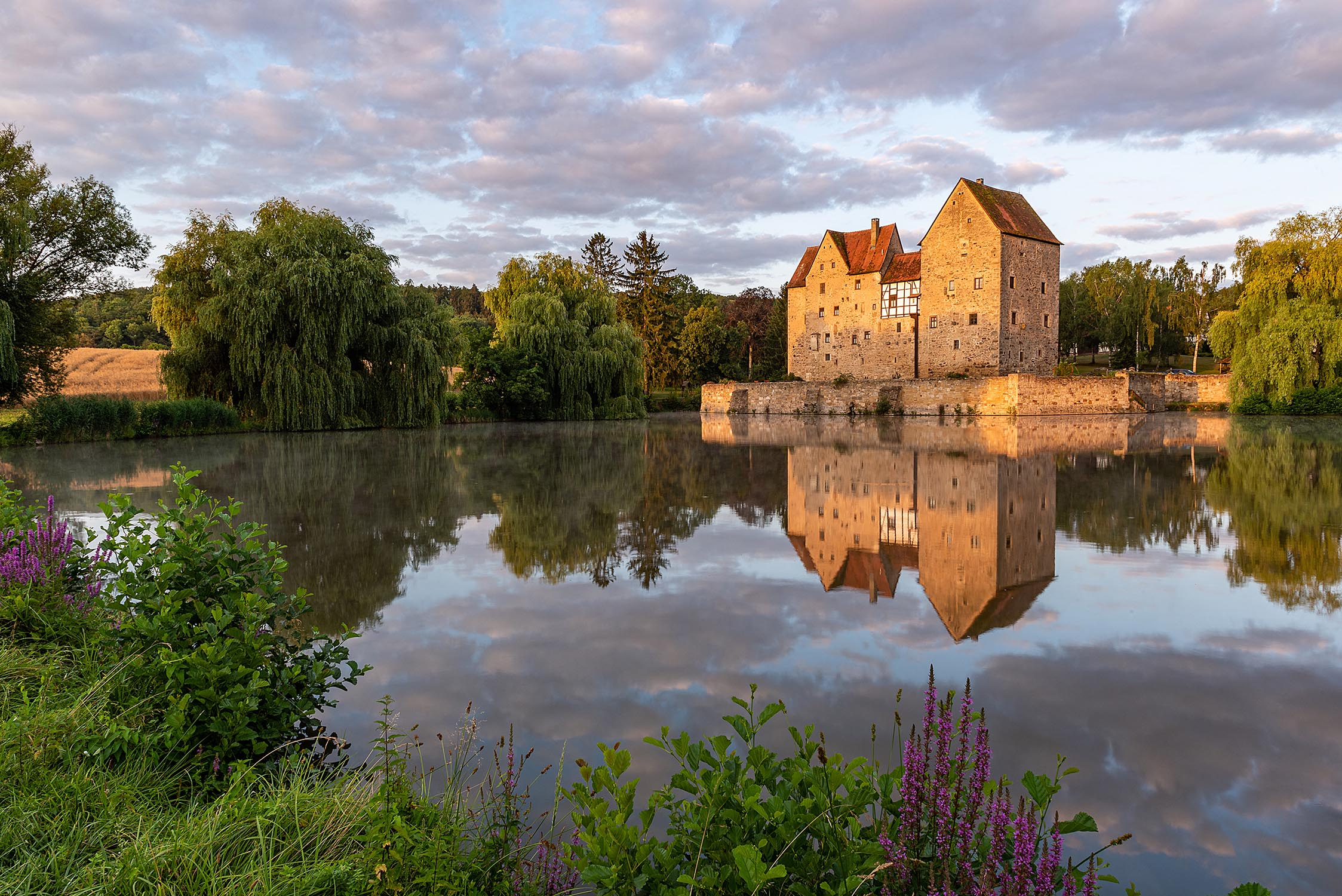
Brennhausen

Brennhausen (German: Burg Brennhausen) is a castle in the municipality of Sulzdorf a.d.Lederhecke in the district of Rhön-Grabfeld in Bavaria in Germany. It is located the Haßberge Nature Park.

== Origin of name ==
=== Houses of Springs ===
Josef Braun explains the name Brennhausen in his place-names book as "the houses by a water source", meaning, in this case, a spring. Braun bases his statement on the fact that immediately next to the settlement, a stream springs forth which flows into the river Saale. Braun discovered that the form Brenn- is a written form, changed from the spoken dialect, which is based on the old form Brünn.

=== Houses of Brunicho ===
Dr. Heinrich Wagner presents a very different view in his Historischen Atlas von Neustadt/Saale (Historical Atlas of Neustadt/Saale). Wagner believes that the origination of the name had nothing to do with the houses by a water source, but rather that the name of the estate is derived from the old German given name, Brunicho. Under this scenario, the founder of Brennhausen used his own name, as was the custom of that time, for the naming of Brunechenhusen.

== Officially documented ==
The first known mention of Brennhausen in an official document was in the year 1182. In this document, Graf Poppo von Henneberg, (VI?) leased to his faithful Wolfram, among others, a tenth of Brunechenhusen. On 29 August 1237, Graf Poppo von Henneberg VII declared that his vassals "Deynodapifer and Theodericus, so-called von Blanckenberg," must repair the damage done to the Brunechenhusen property when it was unjustly withheld from the abbot and the Bildhausen convent.

== Truchseß von Brennhausen ==
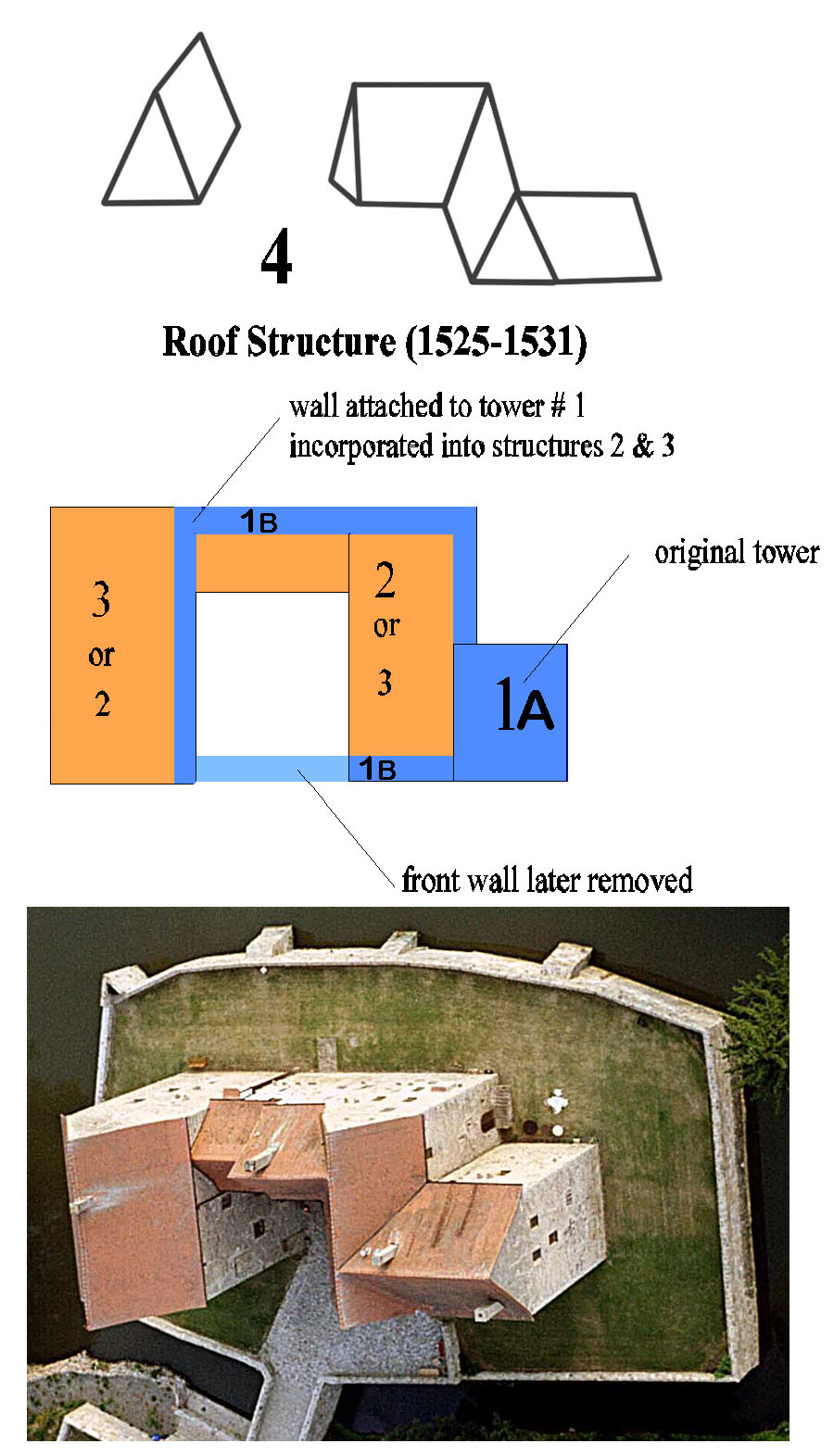
Probable order of construction

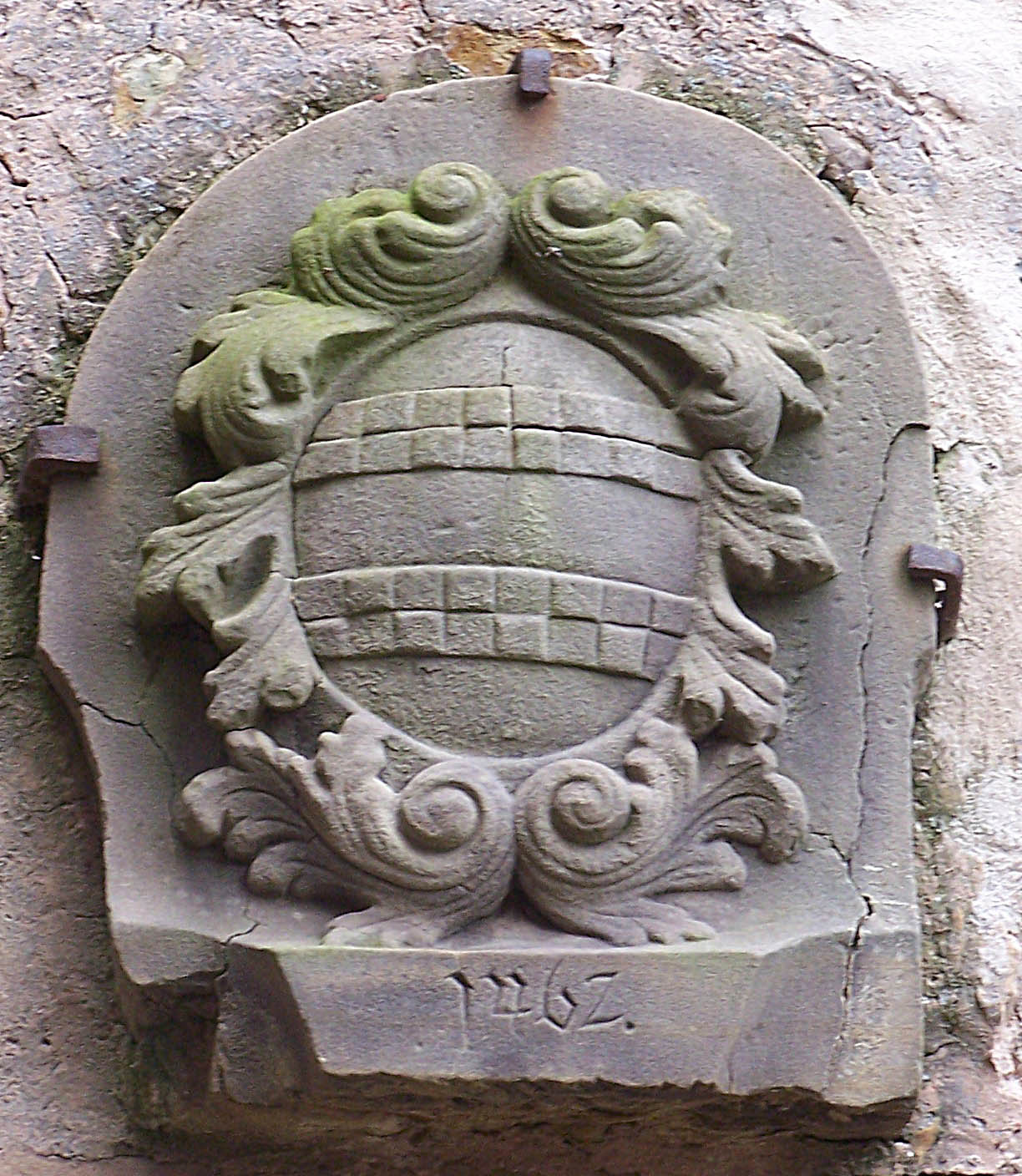
Truchseß von Brennhausen coat of arms in courtyard

The Truchseß von Brennhausen is a genealogical branch of the Truchessen von Wetzhausen which descends from a Hans Truchseß (1260–1330). He had holdings in Wetzhausen, Brennhausen, Sternberg and Essfeld. In the official property record book of the Bishop of Würzburg, Gottfried III von Hohenlohe, with records from 1317 to 1322, it was written that one Truchseß von Blankenberg, and possibly the so-called Hans Truchseß, had holdings in Brennhausen.

In another record book of the Prince-Bishop Albrecht von Hohenlohe, used from 1345 to 1372, it was written in 1345: “Johannes Truchseß von Alsleben owns also a tenth of Gabolshausen, a tenth of Poppenhausen, a half-tenth of Ermershausen, a tenth of Brennhausen, and a half-tenth of Maroldsweisach.”

In 1343, Hans Truchseß was mentioned in a directory of Wetzhausen. It was written: “Notation regarding Mr. Hansen Truchseß, soul of a knight of Brünnhausen and his wedded wife. Owned Wetzhausen, Brünnhausen, Eßfeld and part of zu Sternberg.” His four Sons inherited these four places after his death and started four independent lines which later branched out even more. Diez, the actual founder of the Wetzhausen line, was given by his father, Hans, all of Wetzhausen and one third of Brennhausen. Hans Truchseß the Younger (1309–1370) received two thirds of the Brennhausen holdings and part of Sternberg. Hanns had his residence in Brennhausen.

Brennhausen remained in the Truchseß family until 1542 when Georg Truchseß died with a brief intermission around 1500. Anna, daughter of Philipp Truchseß took Brennhausen into a marriage with Hans von Berlichingen, a vassal of Wilhelm Count von Henneberg. After Hans von Berlichingen death, Anna sold Brennhausen to pay her husband's debts and Brennhausen ended up with Dietz Truchseß.

== Bauernkrieg and the Burning of Brennhausen ==
Both documentation and physical evidence strongly suggest that Brennhausen burned in 1525 during the Bauernkrieg or Peasants (or Farmers) Revolt. The beams of the roof and the entrance to one of the cellars date from right after 1525. Stone work also suggests that the floor levels changed at some point. Also G.P. Höhn in his 1747 Lexicon Topographicum states that the peasants set fire to it in 1525.

== 1542-1681 ==
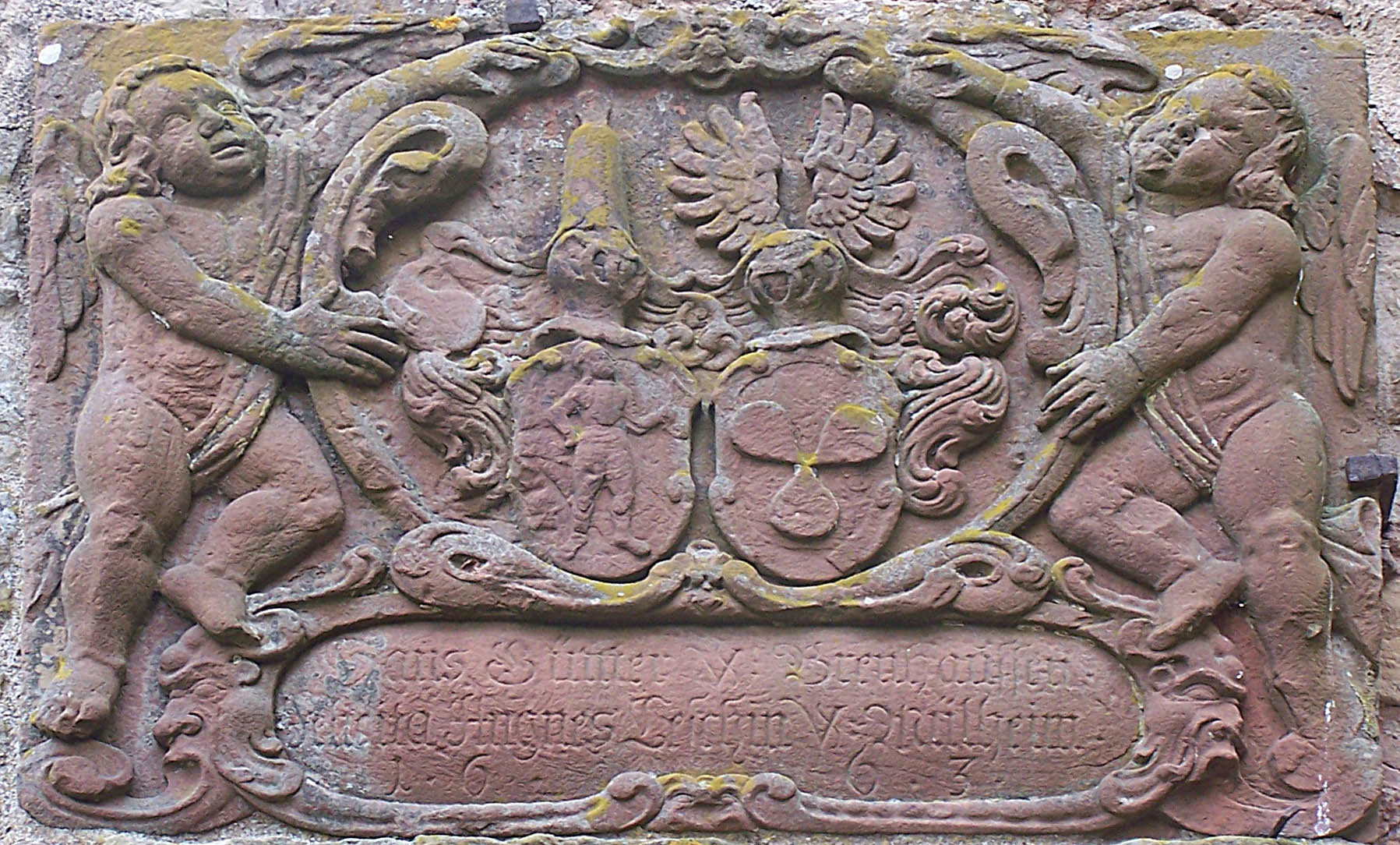
Coat of arms in courtyard of Hans Günther von Brennhausen and his second wife, Felicitas Agnes Leschin von Mülheim

In 1587 Brennhausen was occupied by Georg Wilhelm von Kotzau. By 1593, the Truchseß family were back at Brennhausen. In 1619, the brothers Otto, Heinrich and Adam von und zu Bastheim along with Georg Wilhelm and Veit Ulrich Truchseß von Wetzhausen purchased Brennhausen for 24,597 gulden.

=== Günther von Brennhausen family ===
In 1642, a Franz Günther, a simple farmer's son from Kützberg by Schweinfurt, was ennobled with the family name “Günther von Brennhausen” and given the fief of Brennhausen from the Bishopric of Würzburg. From 1635 to 1647, Franz was the Commandant of the fortress at Königshofen. Franz’ son Hans, also a distinguished military man, received Brennhausen. Hans and his second wife Felicitas Agnes Leschin von Mülheim coat of arms are in the courtyard. The transfer to their minor son, Johann Georg Hartmann Günther von Brennhausen, upon Hans' death was held up in court in part due to Felicitas Agnes being Protestant. The 1675 case was eventually won in 1679 and invested in 1680, only to have Johann Georg Hartmann pass away in 1681.

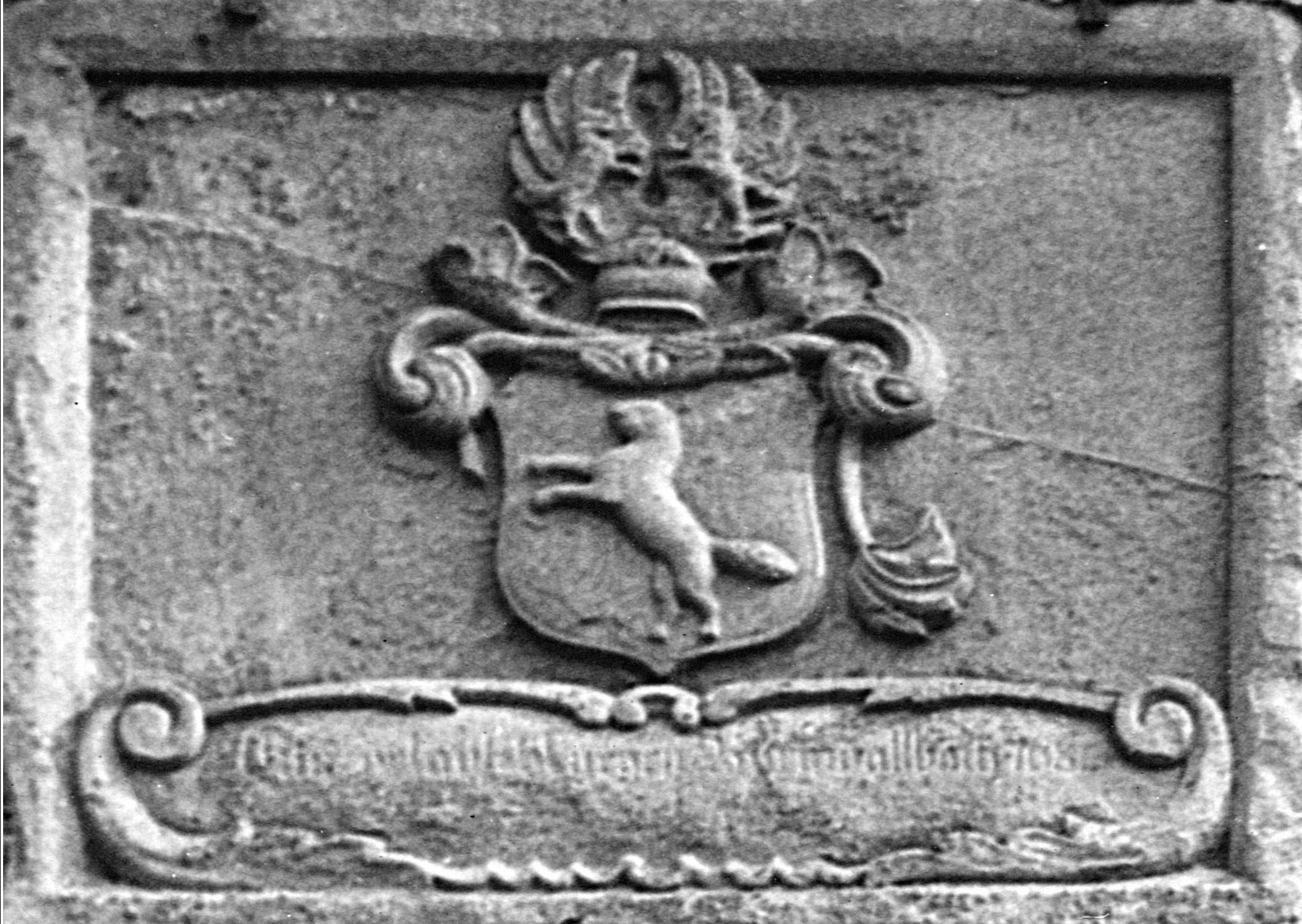
Photo (c.1950) of coat of Arms of the Bibra family in inner courtyard

== 1681 - present: Brennhausen goes to Bibra family ==
In 1681, the von Bibra family received Brennhausen instead of Burgwallbach as part of an out of court settlement of a lawsuit dating from 1602 when the Prince Bishop Julius Echter von Mespelbrunn refused to transfer family fiefs between cousins. This type of transfer was routine but during the Counter Reformation, the bishop refused a transfer to the Protestant cousins. Initially a fief to the Bibra family, it was converted to personal ownership after the end of feudalism and in 2002 transferred to the Stiftung Brennhausen (Foundation) by the family.

=== Seifert/Seyferhold incidents ===
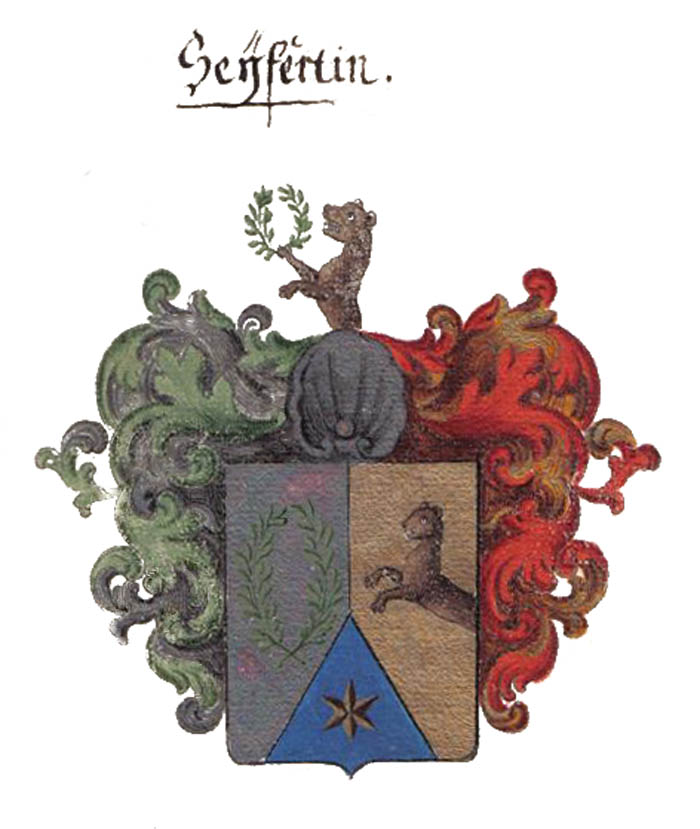
Theresa von Seyferhold coat of arms granted in 1740 by Emperor Karl VI

Ludwig Ernst von Bibra who moved to Brennhausen and married his former pig shepherdess and later housekeeper, Katharina Seifert on 22 October 1734. She was the daughter of a linen weaver and a midwife in Rentwerthausen which is a village next to Bibra.

In 1736 they had a son, Friedrich Gotthelf and in 1739 a second son, Karl. On 8 February 1740 Katherina was raised to the nobility by Emperor Karl VI and given the name Theresa von Seyferhold. Only five months later (16 July 1740) Ludwig Ernst died and his nephew at Bibra, Johann Philip forcibly took possession of Brennhausen with a band of horsemen, exiling the low-born Katharina and her two small sons.

She appealed to the Imperial Court (Reichshofrat) and twelve years later on 28 April 1752 she won an order from the court that Johann Philip must return the property to her sons and pay damages. When Johann Philip children died without children, Bibra was transferred to Katharina's younger son Karl own son, Karl Friedrich.

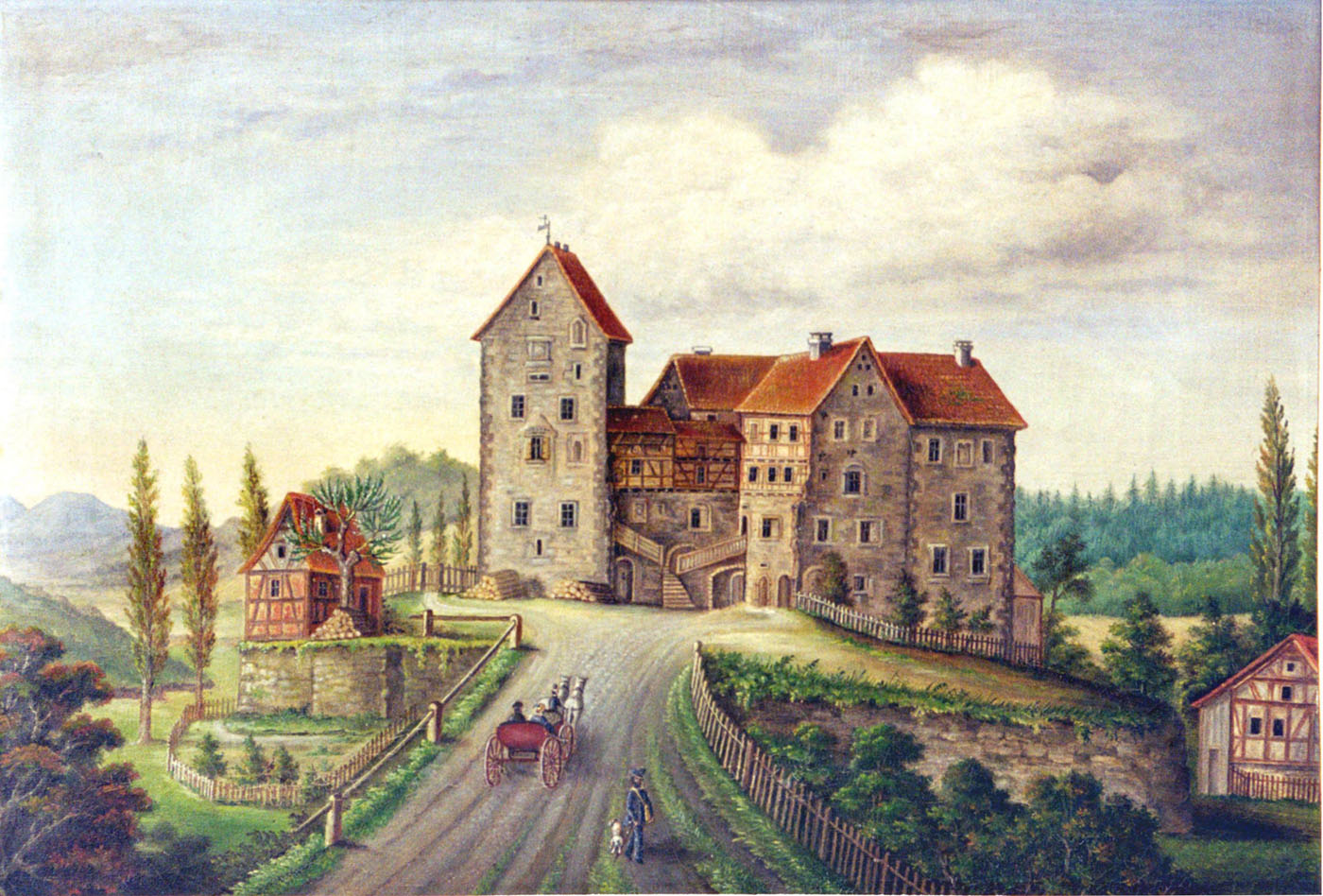
First known painting of Brennhausen

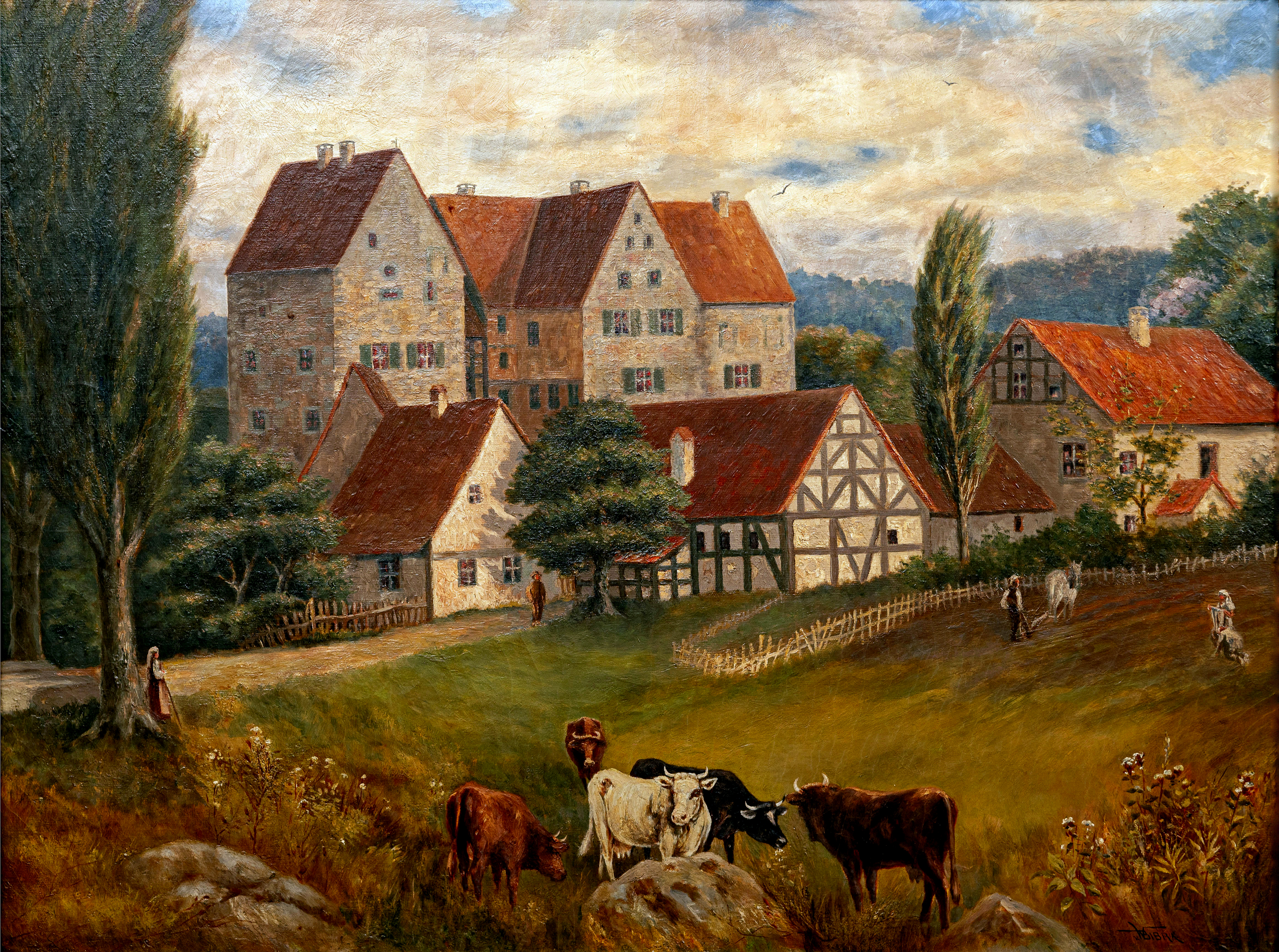
Painting by Wolfgang von Bibra 1884

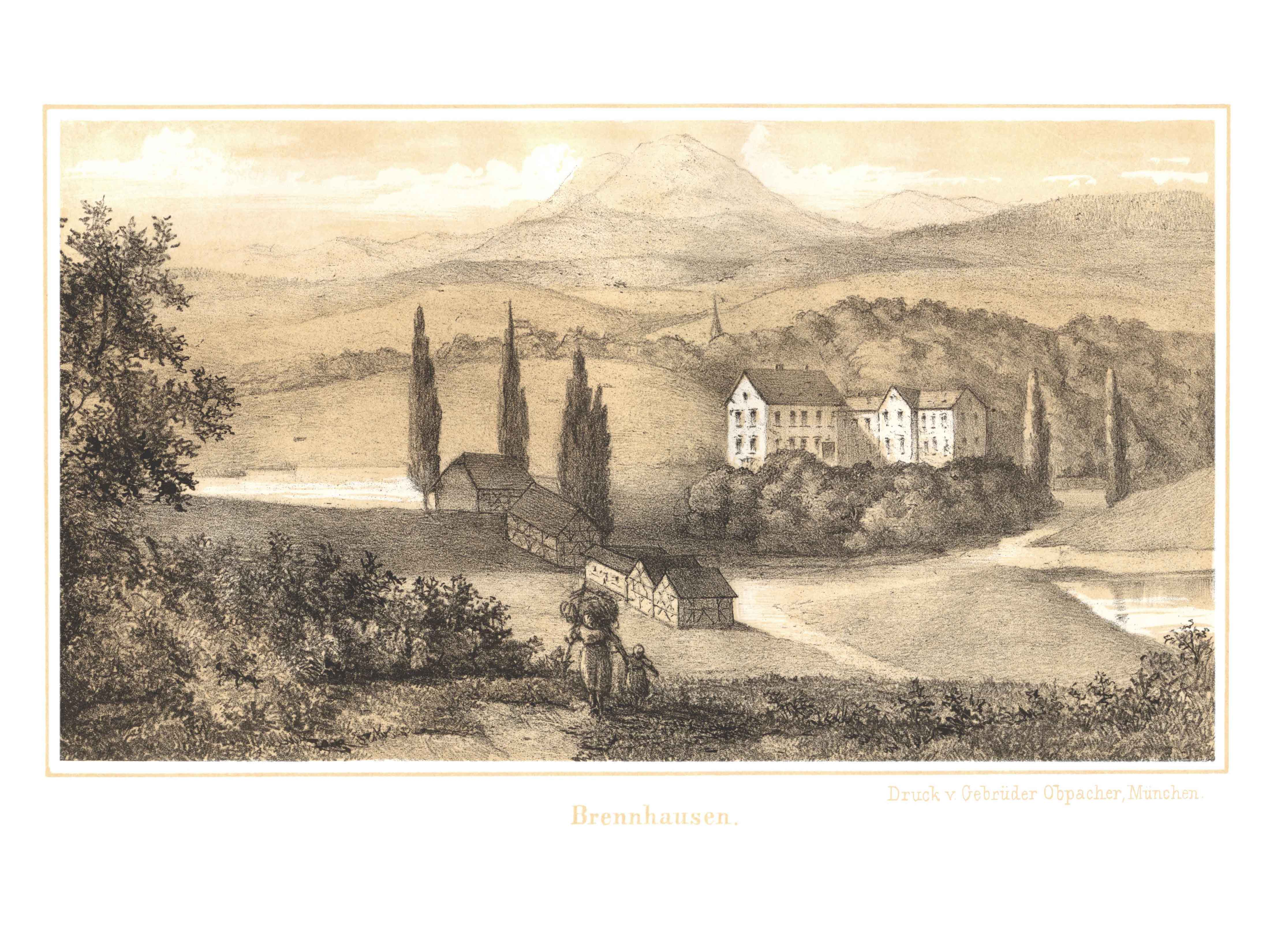
Print from 1870 Bibra family history

== Traditions ==
There is a tradition which states that Brennhausen, in older times, was a monastery, which is where the naming of the surrounding fields, Nonnenäcker (nun's fields) and Pfaffenpfad (pastor's path) must have come.

== Brennhausen the Village ==
In past centuries there were more houses at Brennhausen. Anton Rottmayer in Statistisch-topographisches handbuch für den Unter-Mainkreis des königreichs Bayern published in 1830 describes Brennhausen as having: one castle, seven residences, one mill with two mill stones, ten families, 56 residents, 22 Catholics, 34 Protestants with the Protestants going to Sulzdorf for church and school and the Catholics going to Obereßfeld. In 1832, Johann Wilhelm Rost, described fifty-one inhabitants in twelve families lived at Brennhausen. Ten of them were Catholic, thirty-six Lutheran, and five Jewish. The Catholics went to church in Untereßfeld and the Lutherans in Sulzdorf. Until 1848, Brennhausen had original jurisdiction over its own affairs. In 1915 (WWI), Brennhausen had six residences besides the castle but only two were inhabited. The other four were dilapidated.

== Photo gallery ==
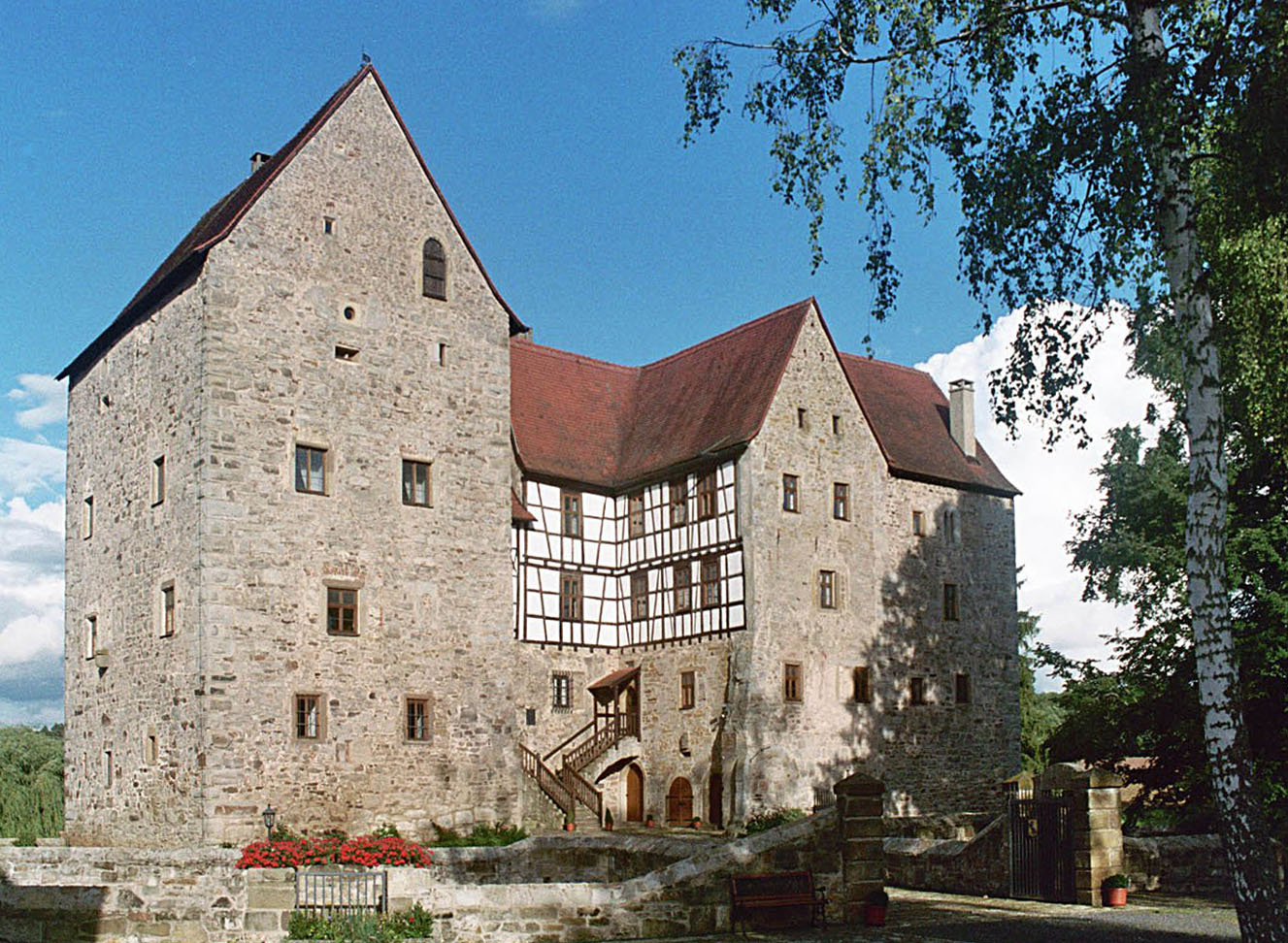

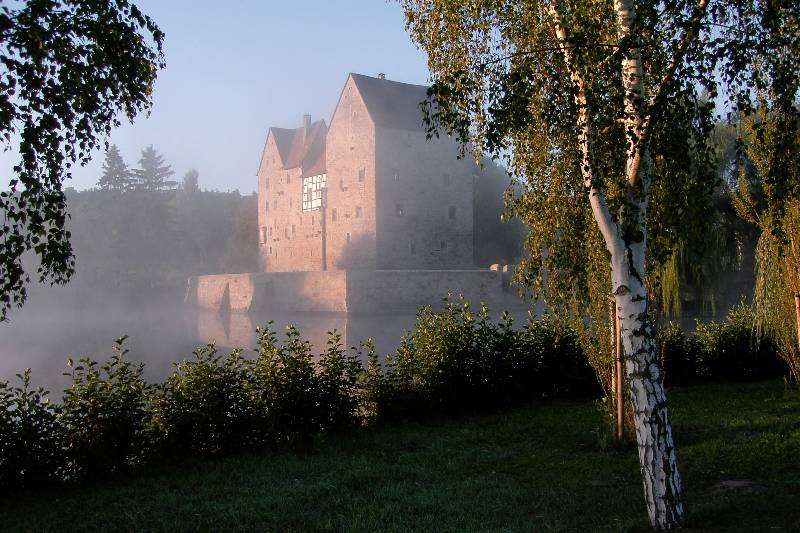

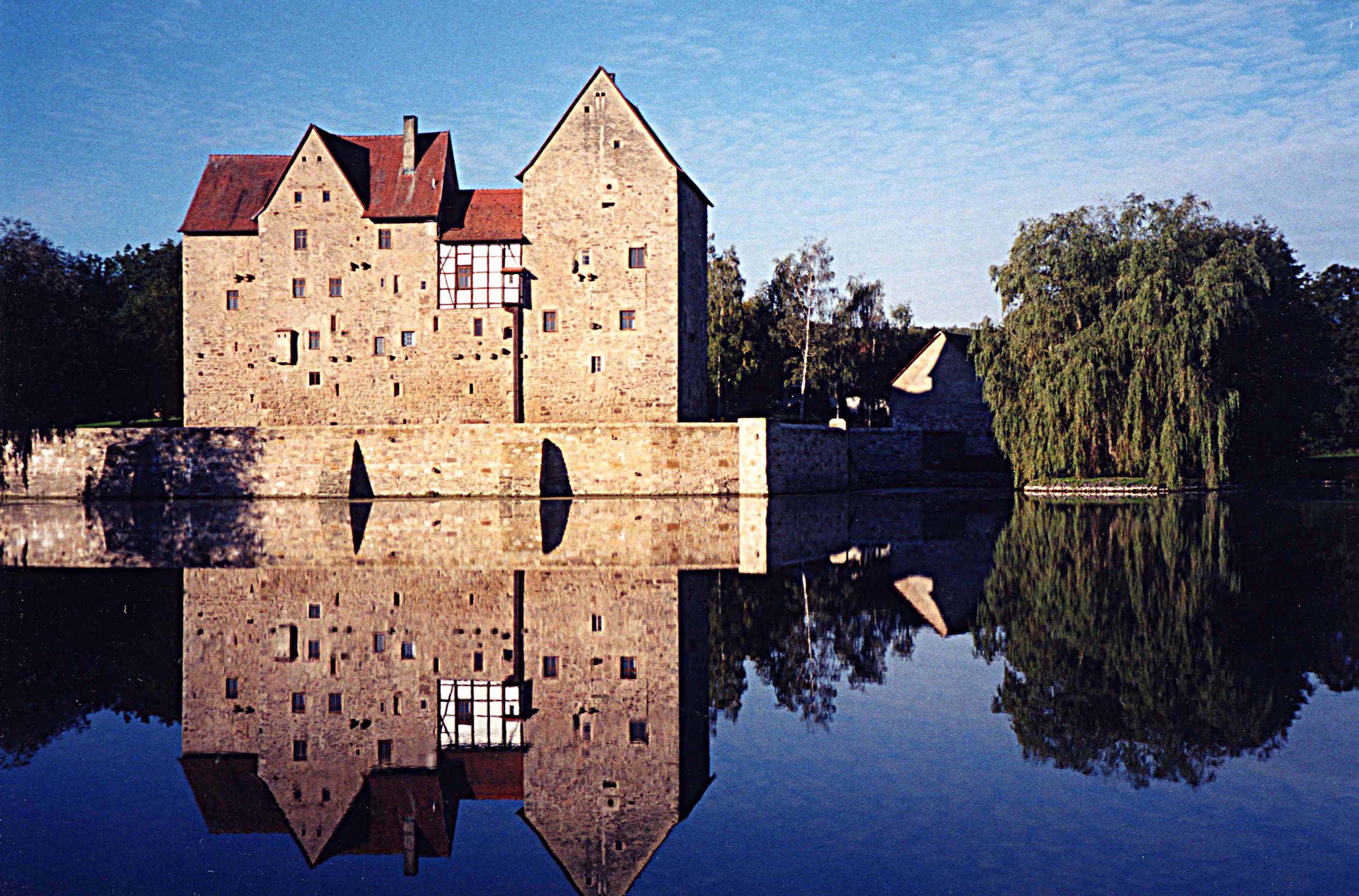

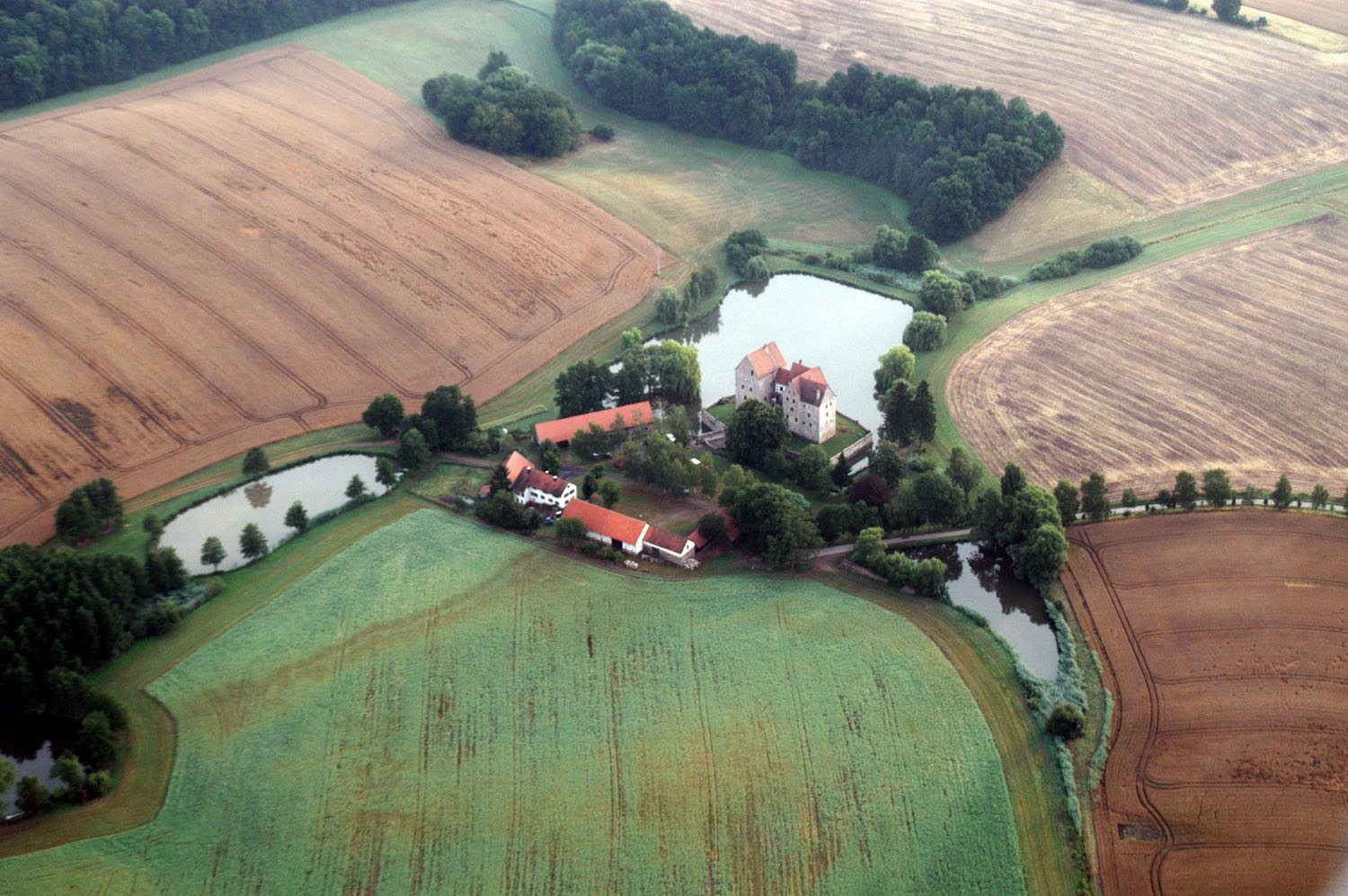

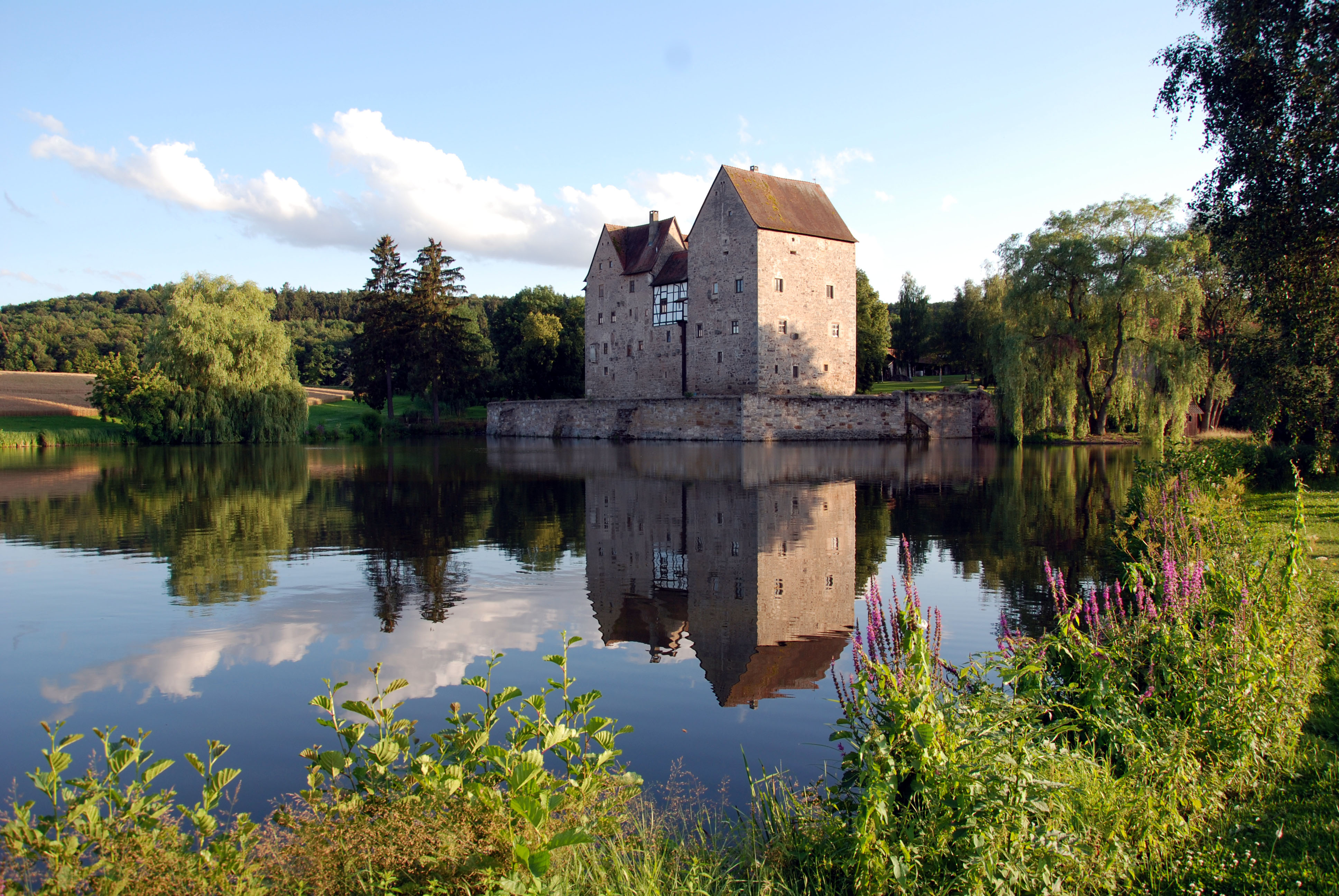

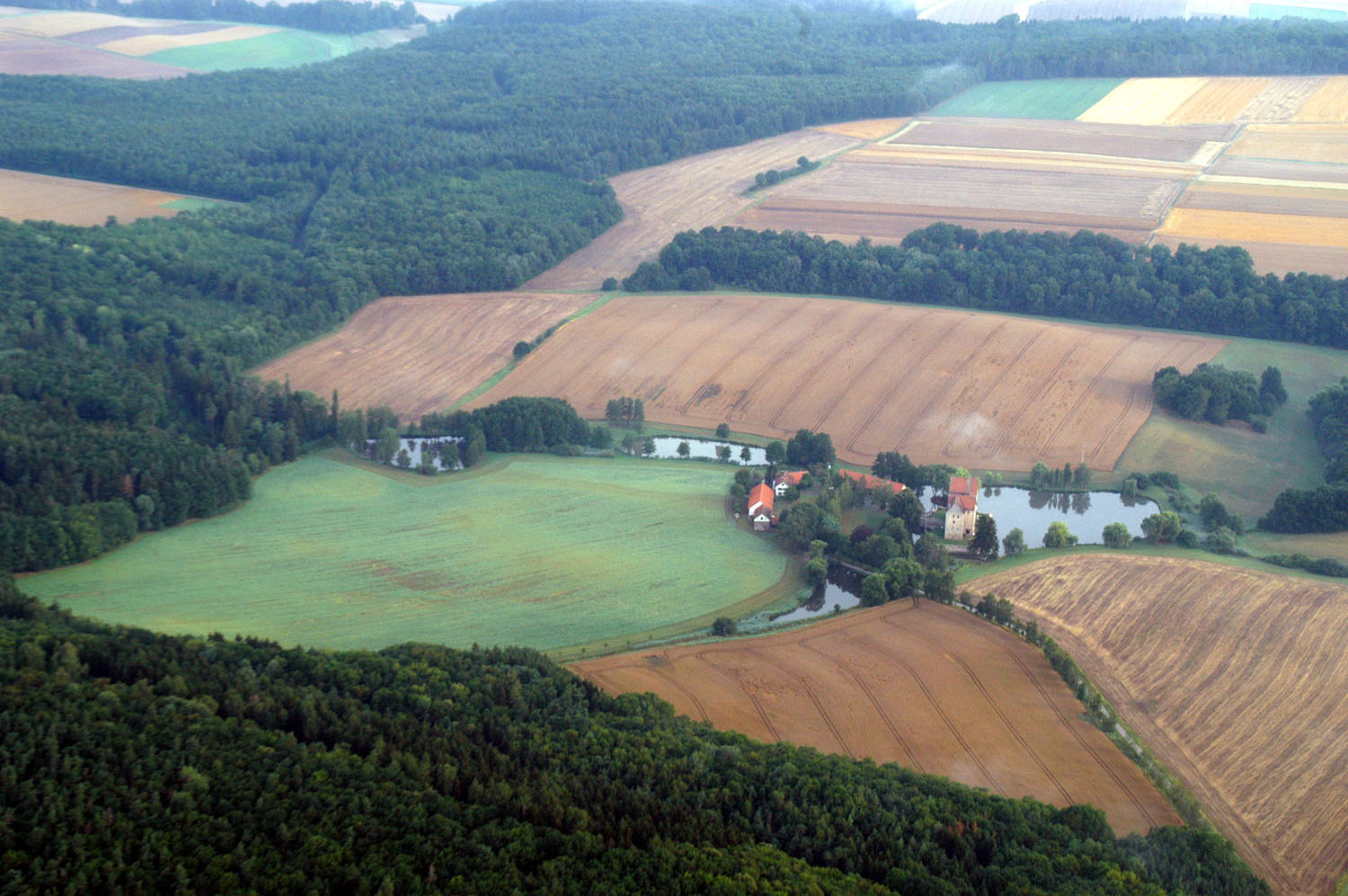

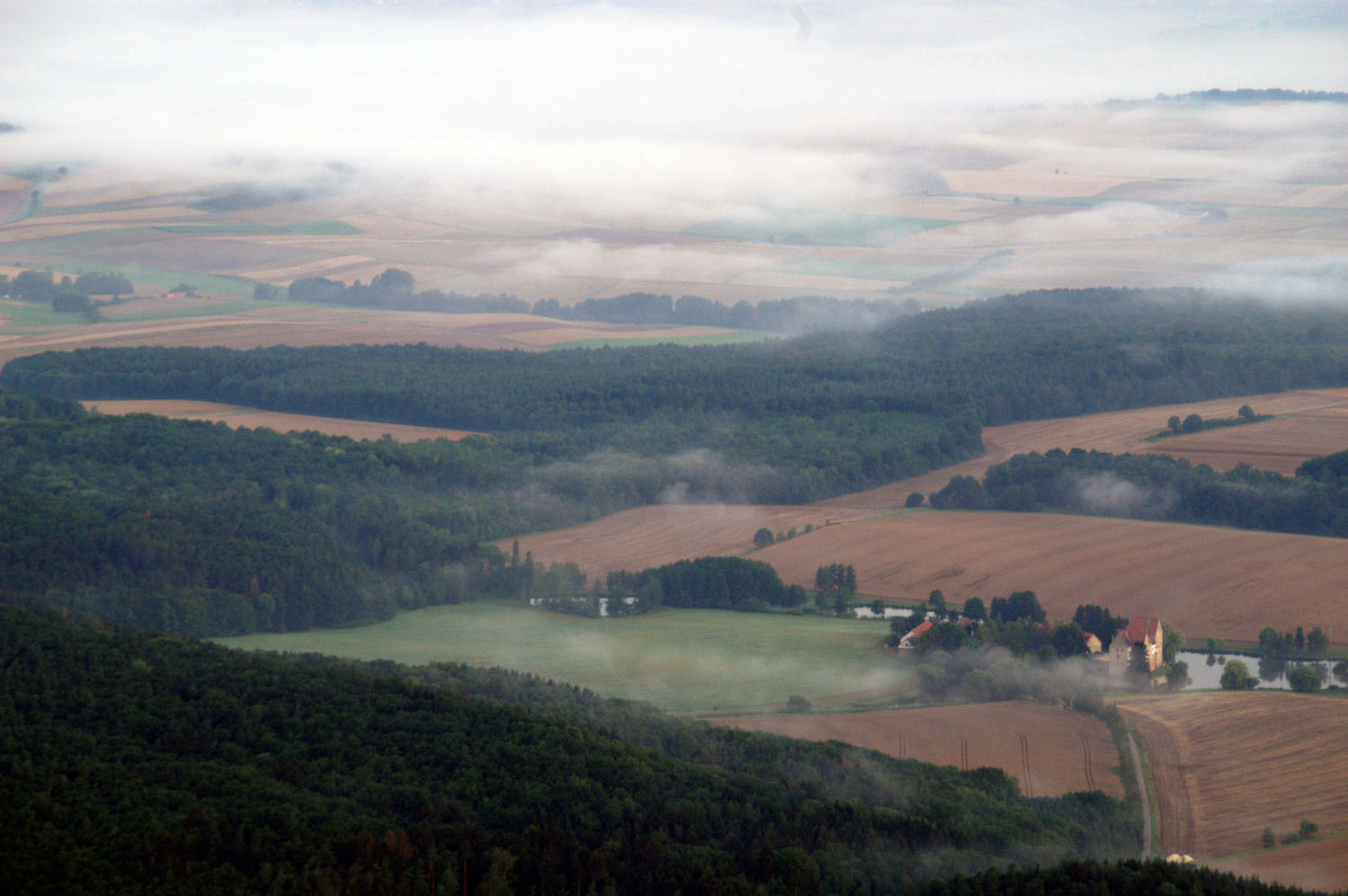

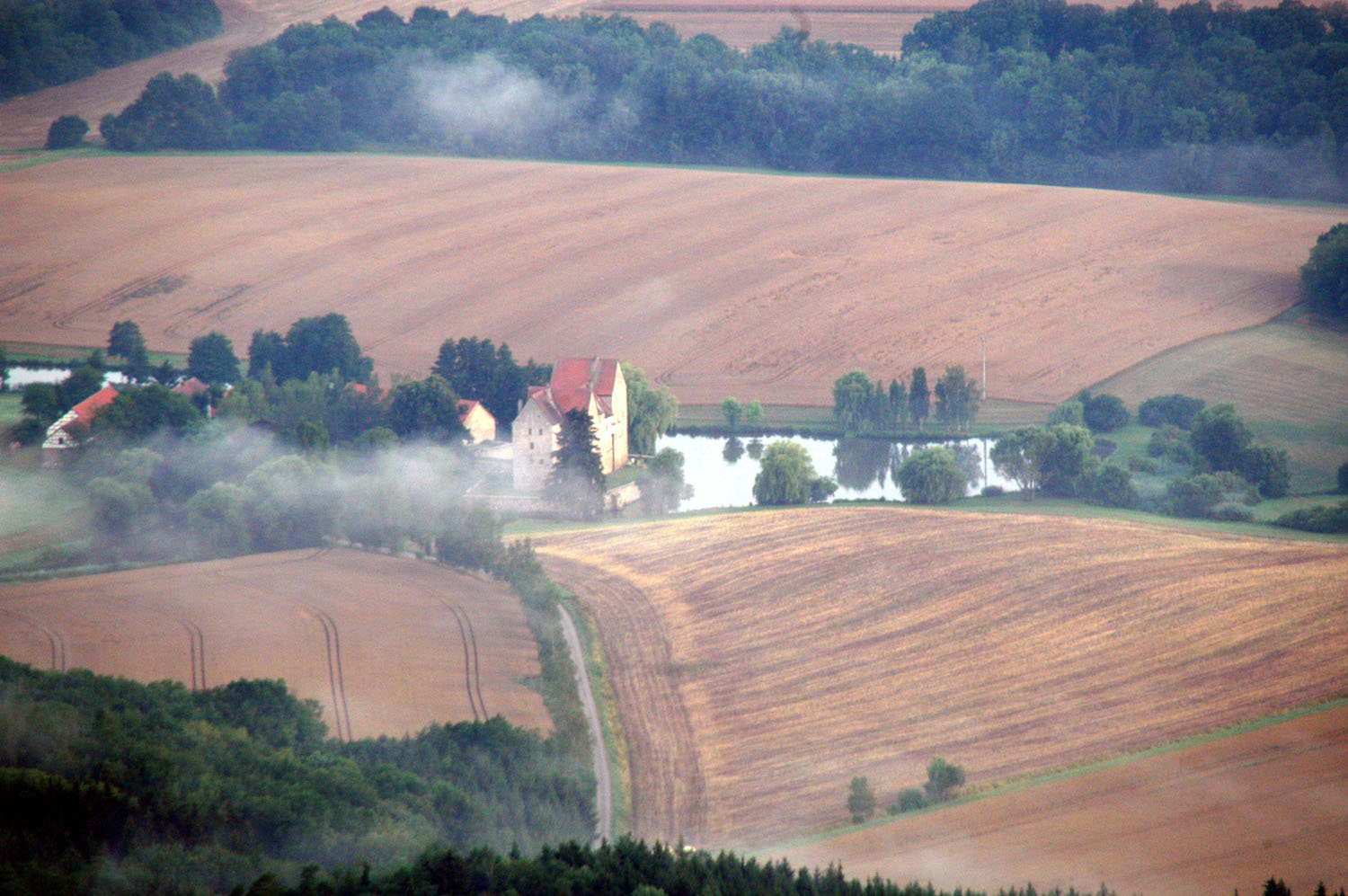

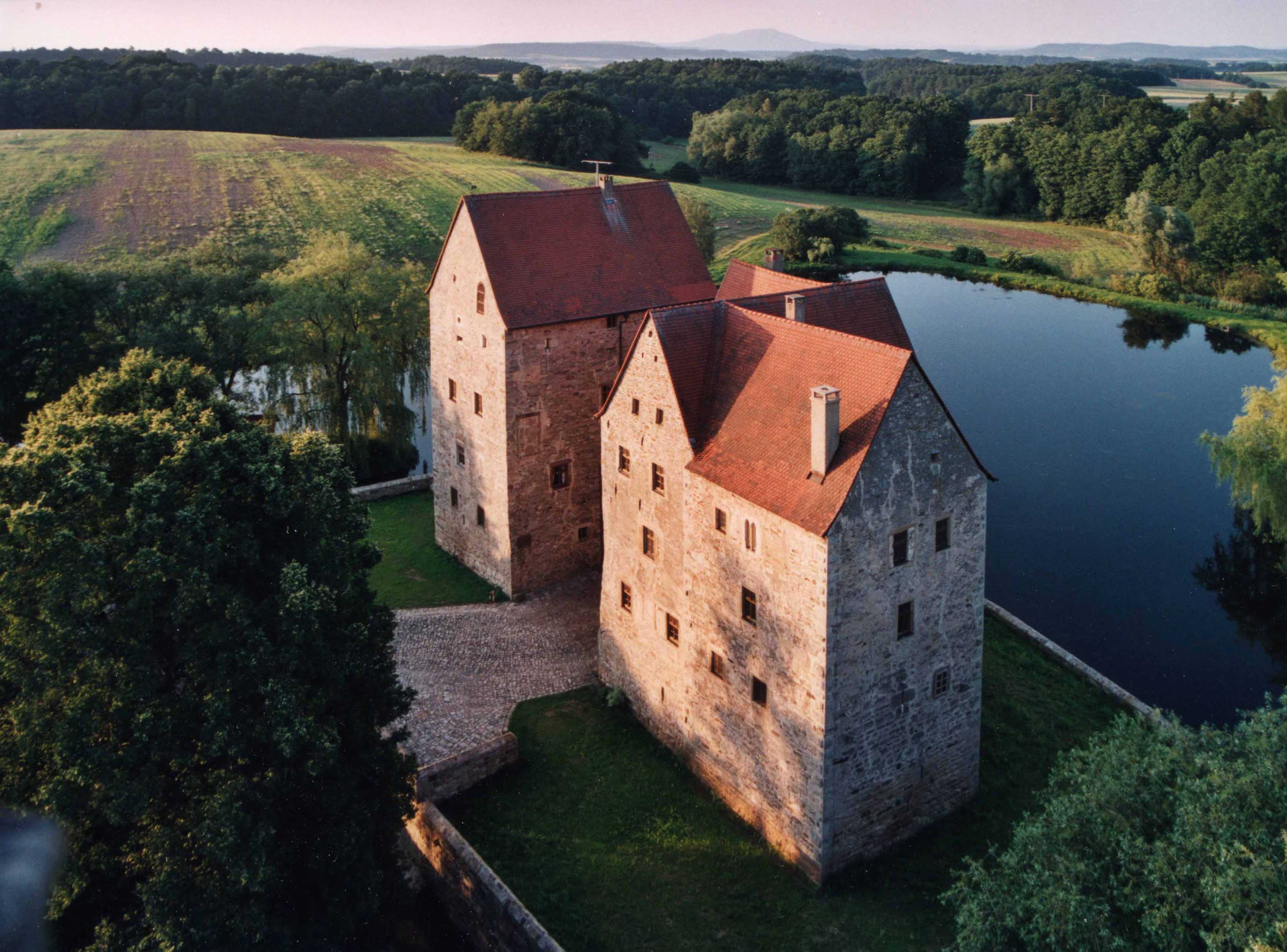
