= Sulzdorf an der Lederhecke =

- Municipality
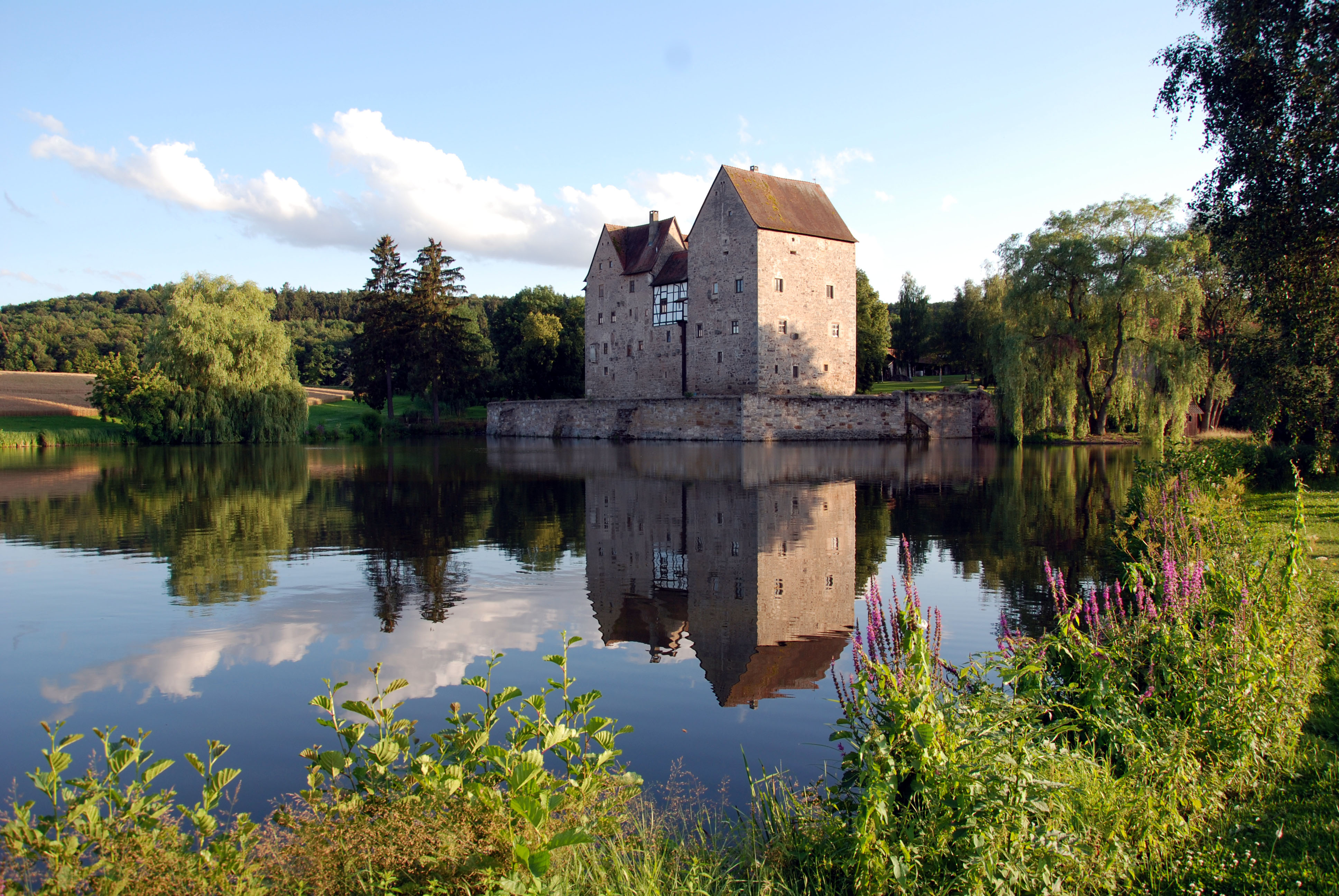
- The Brennhausen water castle

- Coat of arms

- Location of Sulzdorf an der Lederhecke within Rhön-Grabfeld district
- Interactive map of Sulzdorf an der Lederhecke
- Location within Germany Location within Bavaria
- Coordinates: 50°14′N 10°34′E
- Country: Germany
- State: Bavaria
- Admin. region: Unterfranken
- District: Rhön-Grabfeld
- Municipal assoc.: Bad Königshofen im Grabfeld

Government
  - Mayor (2020–26): Angelika Götz

Area
  - Total: 36.41 km^{2} (14.06 sq mi)
- Elevation: 330 m (1,080 ft)

Population (2025-12-31)
  - Total: 1,140
  - Density: 31.3/km^{2} (81.1/sq mi)
- Time zone: UTC+01:00 (CET)
  - Summer (DST): UTC+02:00 (CEST)
- Postal codes: 97528
- Dialling codes: 09763
- Vehicle registration: NES
- Website: www.sulzdorf-adl.de

Sulzdorf an der Lederhecke is a municipality in the district of Rhön-Grabfeld in Bavaria in Germany. The Gemeinde is composed of six villages: (Obereßfeld, Schwanhausen, Serrfeld, Sternberg im Grabfeld, Sulzdorf an der Lederhecke, Zimmerau) and four hamlets: Brennhausen, Heckenmühle, Serrfeldermühle, Sulzdorfermühle.

== Bibliography ==
- Reinhold Albert, 1994: Chronik der Gemeinde Sulzdorf an der Lederhecke (2 Volumes, in 860 pages) published by the Gemeinde Sulzdorf a. d. L., Verlag Frankenschwelle (Hildburghausen) 1994.

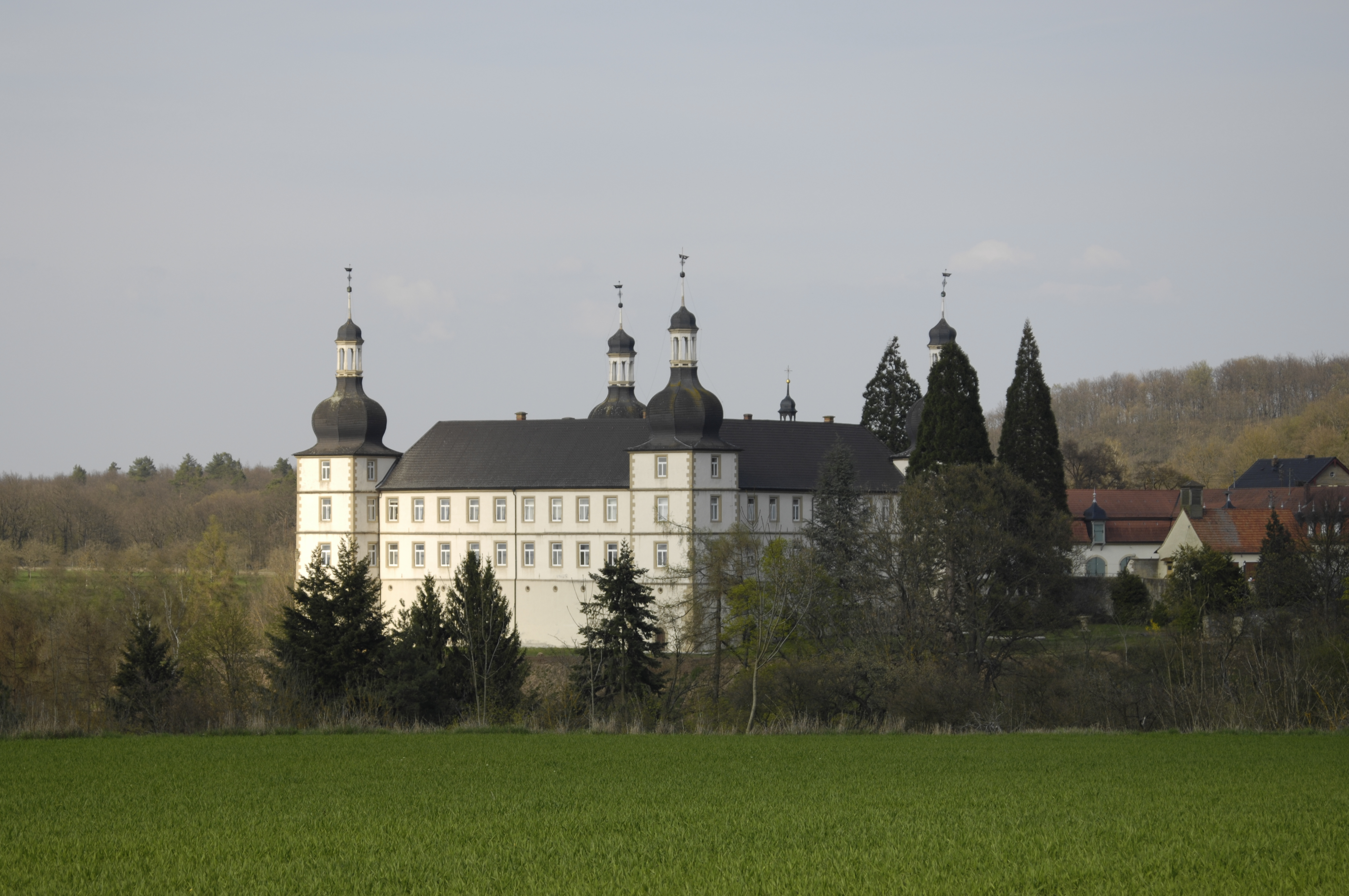
The "Calendar Castle" Schloss Sternberg
