= Alte Burg (Altenstein) =

- Maroldsweisach-Altenstein
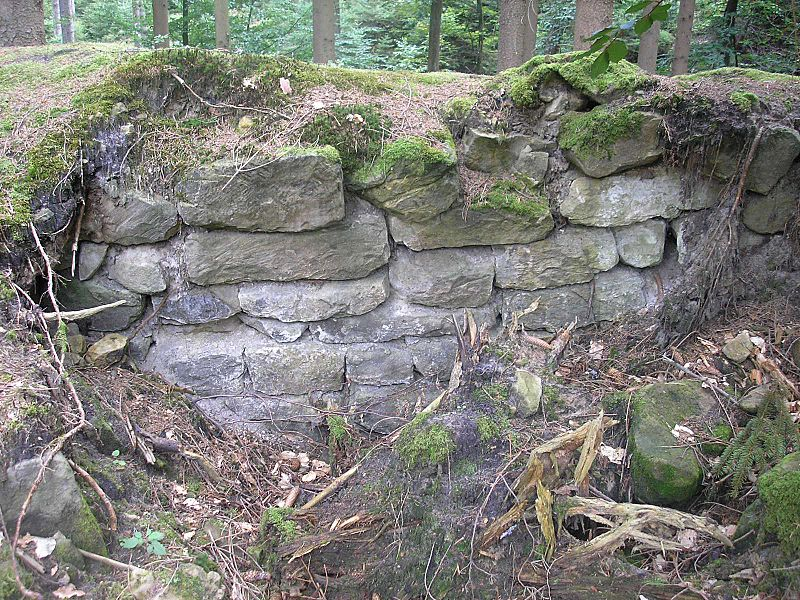
- The exposed section of wall from the inside

Site information
- Type: hill castle, spur castle
- Code: DE-BY
- Condition: Circular rampart, remains of the dry sandstone wall

Location
- Coordinates: 50°10′29″N 10°46′14″E
- Height: 405 m above sea level (NN)

Site history
- Materials: ashlar masonry

The Alte Burg ("Old Castle") is an early medieval ringwork between Altenstein and Lichtenstein in the borough of Market Maroldsweisach in the Lower Franconian county of Haßberge in the province of Lower Franconia in Bavaria, Germany.

== Location ==
The circular rampart lies at a height of 405 m above sea level (NN) on a rocky spur on the northern slopes of a ridge in the Franconian Haßberge hills, which are also home to the high medieval castles of Altenstein, Lichtenstein, Rotenhan and Teufelsstein. Only about 150 metres east in the forest is another protected monument, also called the Alte Burg.

== Description ==
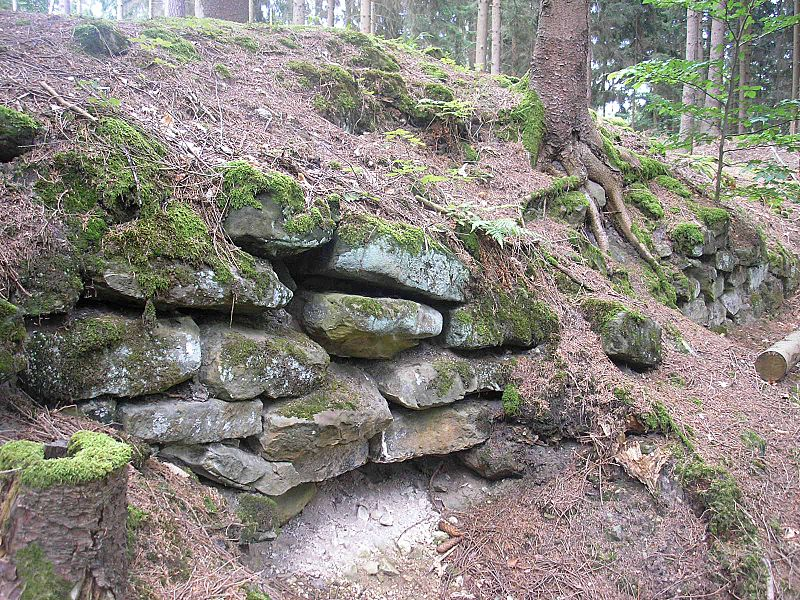
The exposed section of wall from the outside

The medium-sized (ca. 115×150 metres) ringwork, which is assumed to date to the Early Middle Ages, is protected to the northeast and southeast by a steep slope and is surrounded by a sandstone wall, which has survived in places. This wall consists of dry sandstone ashlars and most of it is embedded in a rampart up to five metres high. A short section of the circular rampart in the south has been uncovered. There are also some well preserved sections of wall on the steep hillside.

In front of the rampart is a ditch, about five metres wide and up to one and a half metres deep. The internal height of the rampart is up to two metres. The gateway lies in the northwest, the rampart bends inwards at this point, in a pincer shape, and the northern flank has been pushed out in the shape of a nose or salient.

A moat, roughly 50 metres long, in the interior of the castle is thought to be from an earlier fortification on the same site. This internal ditch is now only about half a metre deep, three metres wide and runs from north to south.

The circular rampart was archaeologically investigated in 1964 and a survey by Eugen Ixmeier of the Bavarian State Office for Protected Monuments followed in 1970. Topographic photographs were published in 1979 (see literature).

In spring 2007, the eastern part of the archaeological site was damaged by a windthrow and the subsequent cleanup operation. This resulted in the loss of part of the exposed wall sections.

The Bavarian State Office for Protected Monuments has designated the site as a ringwork of the Early Middle Ages and allocated it the index monument number D 6–5830–0007.

== Geotope ==
The sandstones on which the castle stands form the summit area of the hill and are slipping downhill to some extent on the underlying clay and clay marl rocks of the Feuerletten. Extensive redevelopment measures have been carried out to try and prevent further deterioration of the ruins. The rocks have been designated by the Bavarian State Office for the Environment as geotope number 674A010. Because the geotope is part of the Hassberge Castle Trail, information boards have been erected here.

== Literature ==
- Björn-Uwe Abels: Die vor- und frühgeschichtlichen Geländedenkmäler Unterfrankens. (Materialhefte zur bayerischen Vorgeschichte, Reihe B, Band 6). Verlag Michael Lassleben, Kallmünz, 1979, ISBN 3-7847-5306-X, p. 89.
