= Haßberge Nature Park =

Nature park in Bavaria, Germany

Coordinates: 50.13°N 10.66°E

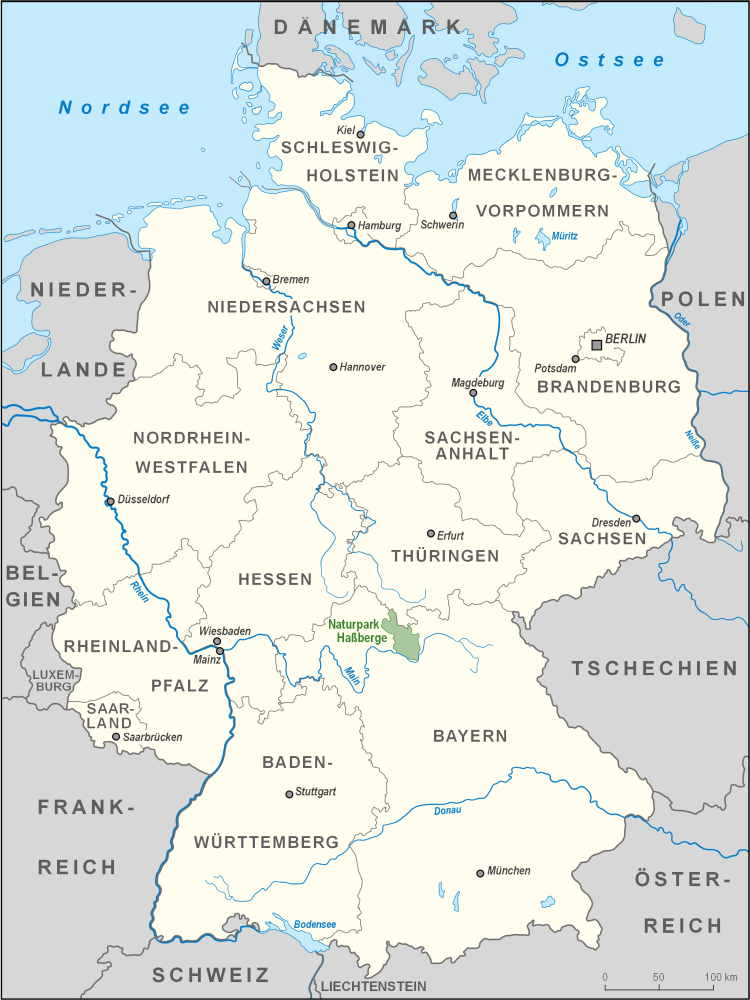
Location of Haßberge Park

Haßberge Nature Park (German: Naturpark Haßberge) is a park of 804 km^{2} (310 sq mi) located in the north east of Franconian Keuperland in Bavaria, Germany.

== Isolated castles and ruins ==
The park has a large number of isolated castles and ruins which are integrated into the park's well marked walking paths.

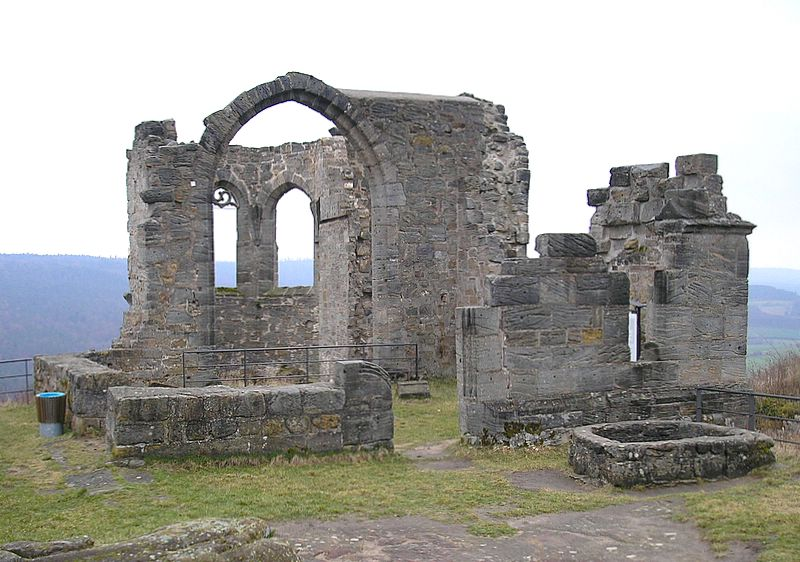
Altenstein

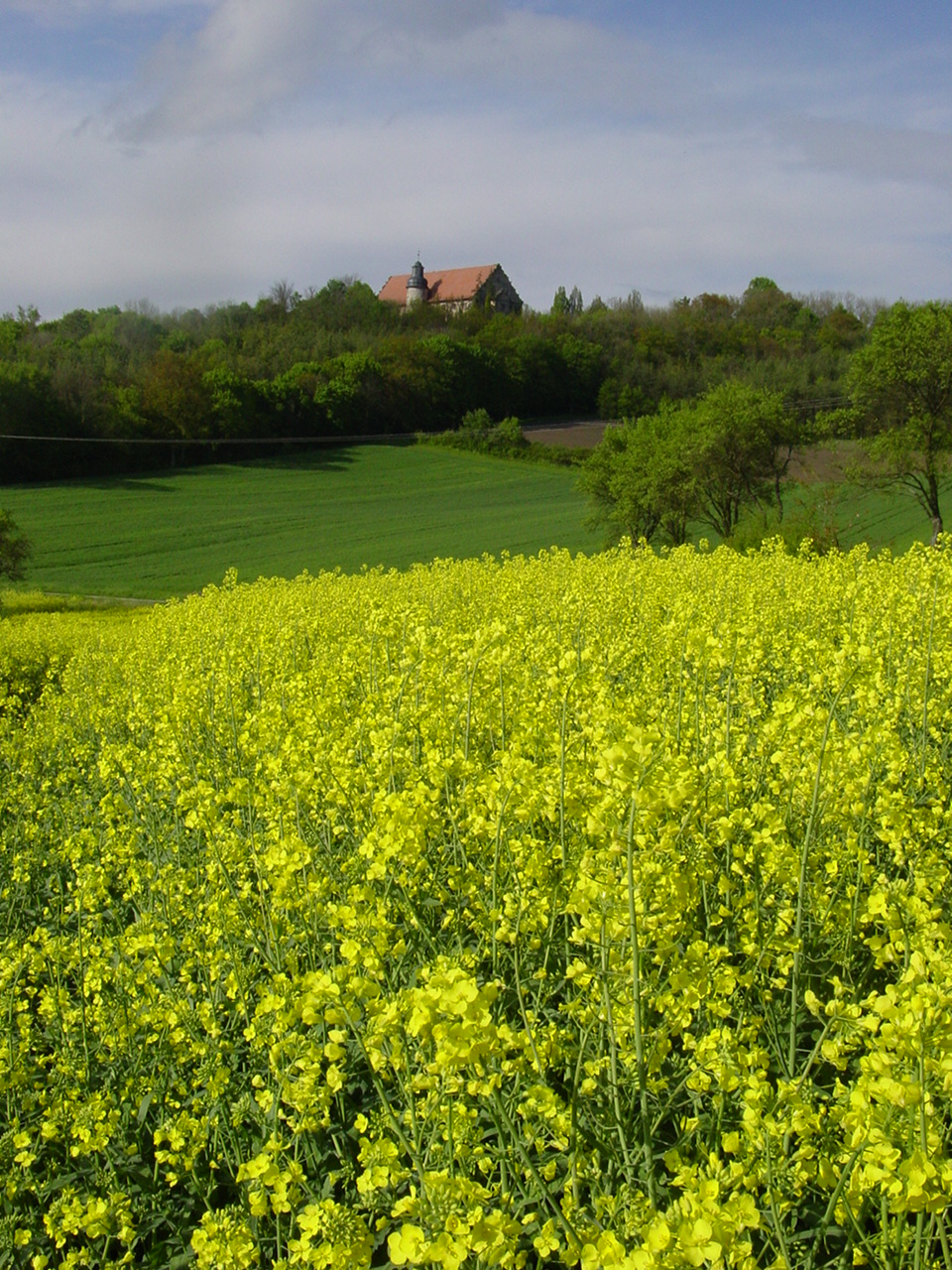
Bettenburg

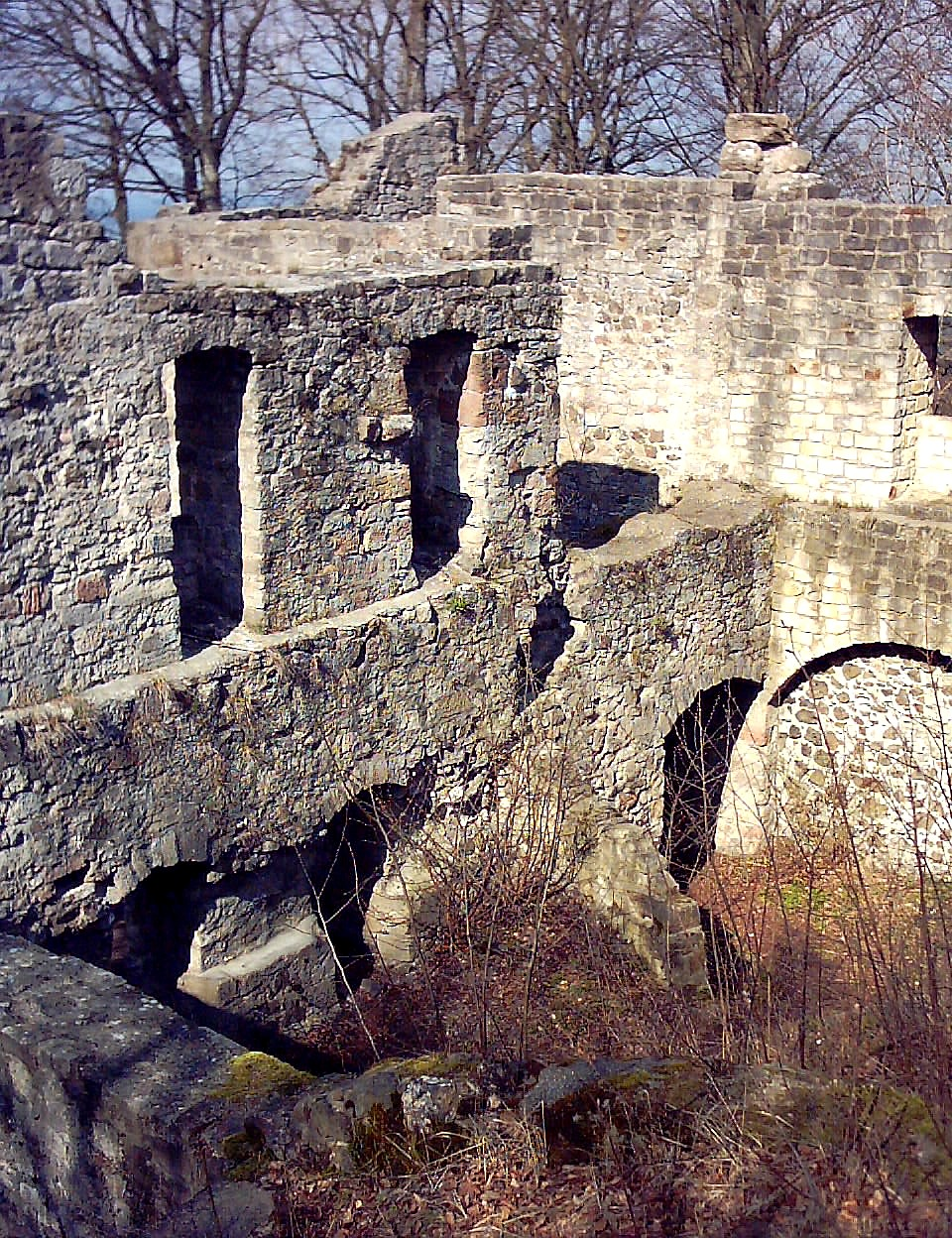
Burg Bramberg

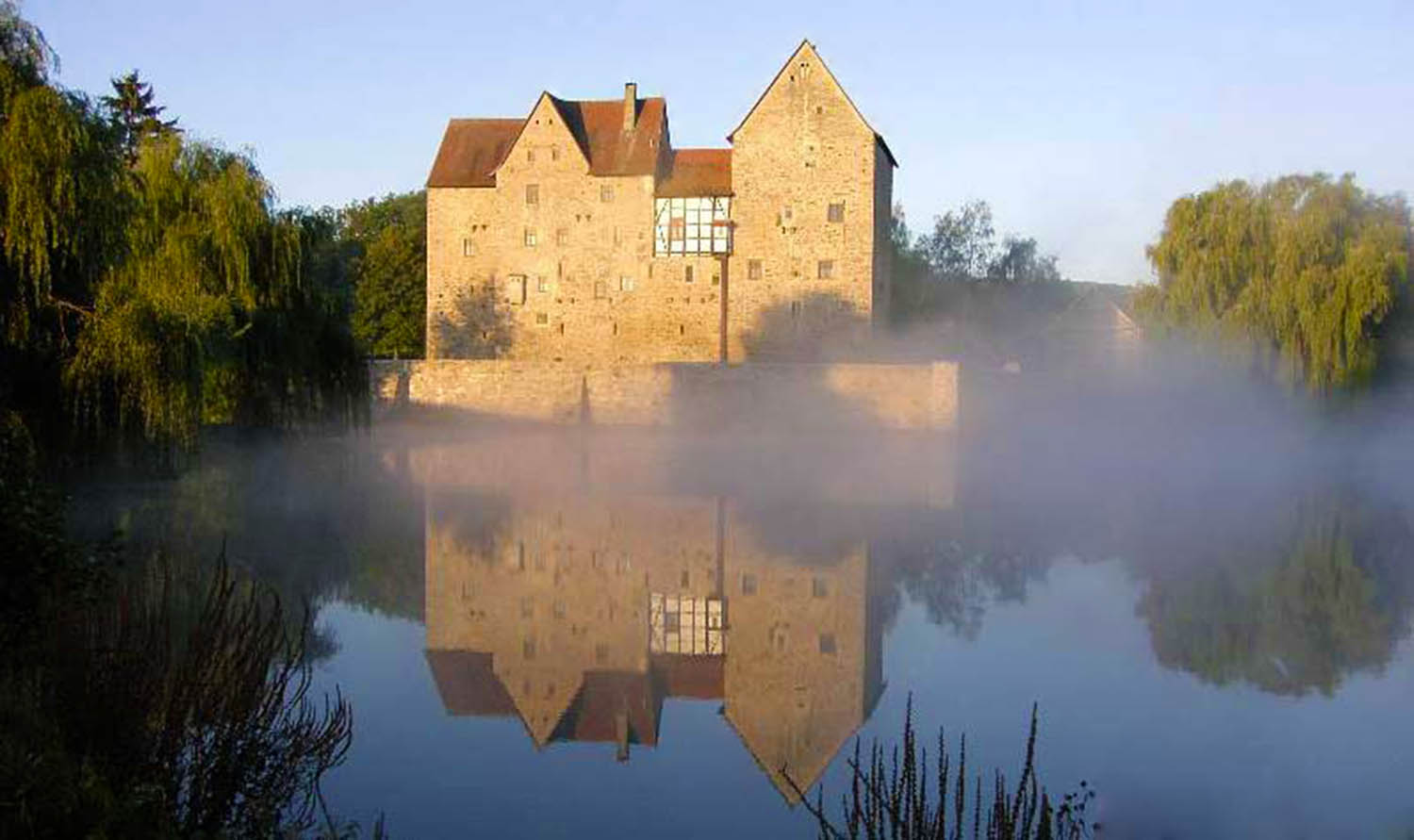
Brennhausen

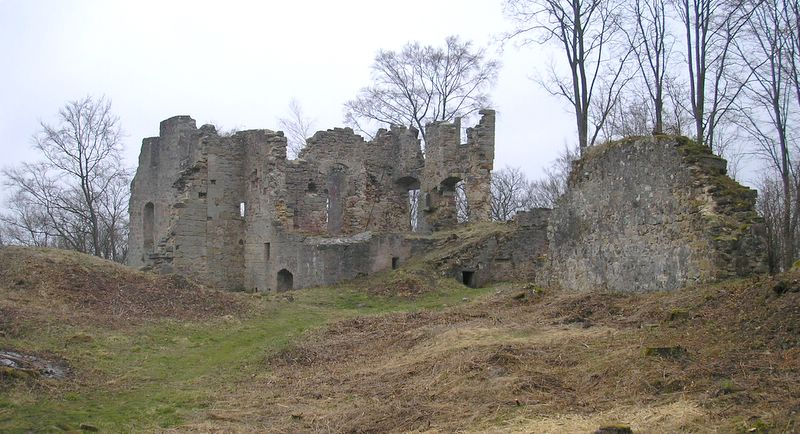
Rauheneck

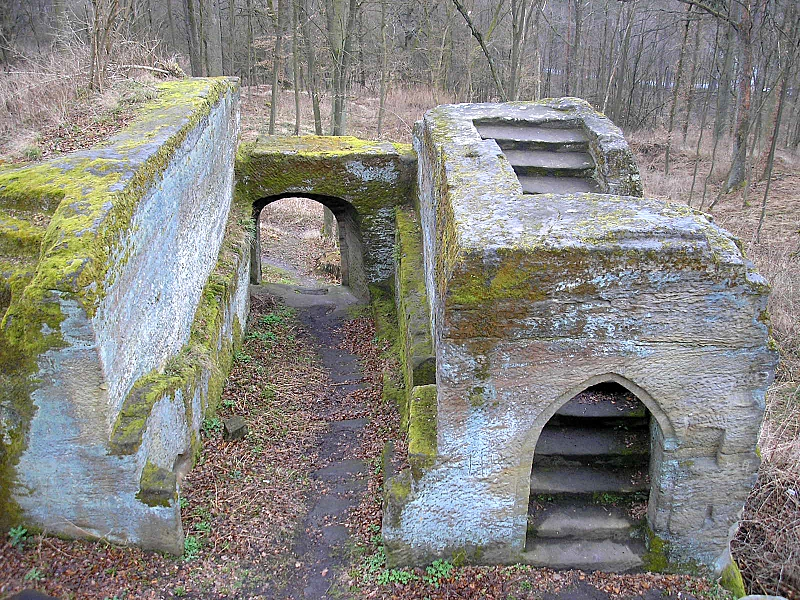
Burg Rotenhan

== See also ==
- List of nature parks in Germany
