= Maroldsweisach =

- Municipality
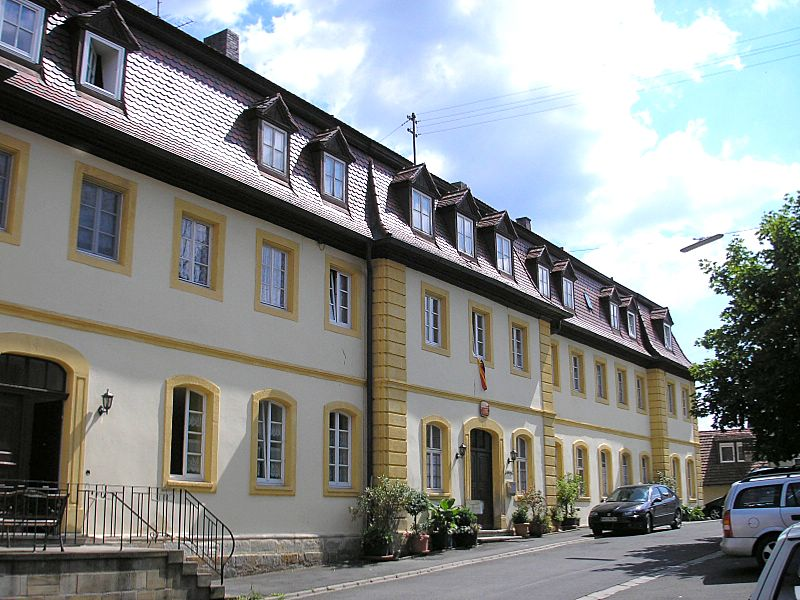
- Maroldsweisach Castle

- Coat of arms

- Location of Maroldsweisach within Haßberge district
- Interactive map of Maroldsweisach
- Location within Germany Location within Bavaria
- Coordinates: 50°11′51″N 10°39′49″E
- Country: Germany
- State: Bavaria
- Admin. region: Unterfranken
- District: Haßberge

Government
  - Mayor (2020–26): Wolfram Thein (SPD)

Area
  - Total: 71.87 km^{2} (27.75 sq mi)
- Elevation: 334 m (1,096 ft)

Population (2025-12-31)
  - Total: 3,069
  - Density: 42.70/km^{2} (110.6/sq mi)
- Time zone: UTC+01:00 (CET)
  - Summer (DST): UTC+02:00 (CEST)
- Postal codes: 96126
- Dialling codes: 09532
- Vehicle registration: HAS
- Website: www.maroldsweisach.de

Maroldsweisach is a municipality in the district of Haßberge in Bavaria in Germany.

== Culture and sights ==
- Alte Burg (Altenstein), the "Old Castle"
- Altenstein Castle
- Ditterswind Palace
- Hafenpreppach Palace
- Maroldsweisach Palace
- Pfaffendorf Palace
- Pfaffendorf Village Church
- Birkenfeld Palace
- Jewish Cemetery with memorial tablets to persecuted and murdered Jews

== Local Citizens of Note ==
- Joseph Brunner (November 26, 1706 –– November 19, 1827) was born in Trappstadt and died in Altenstein. Once considered to have been the oldest proven person, information has recently surfaced which suggests he may have only been born in 1739, making him 88 years old at the time of his death
- Rudolf Berthold, the World War I flying ace and Pour le Merite winner, was born in Ditterswind.
