= Bibra family =

House of Bibra
- Noble house
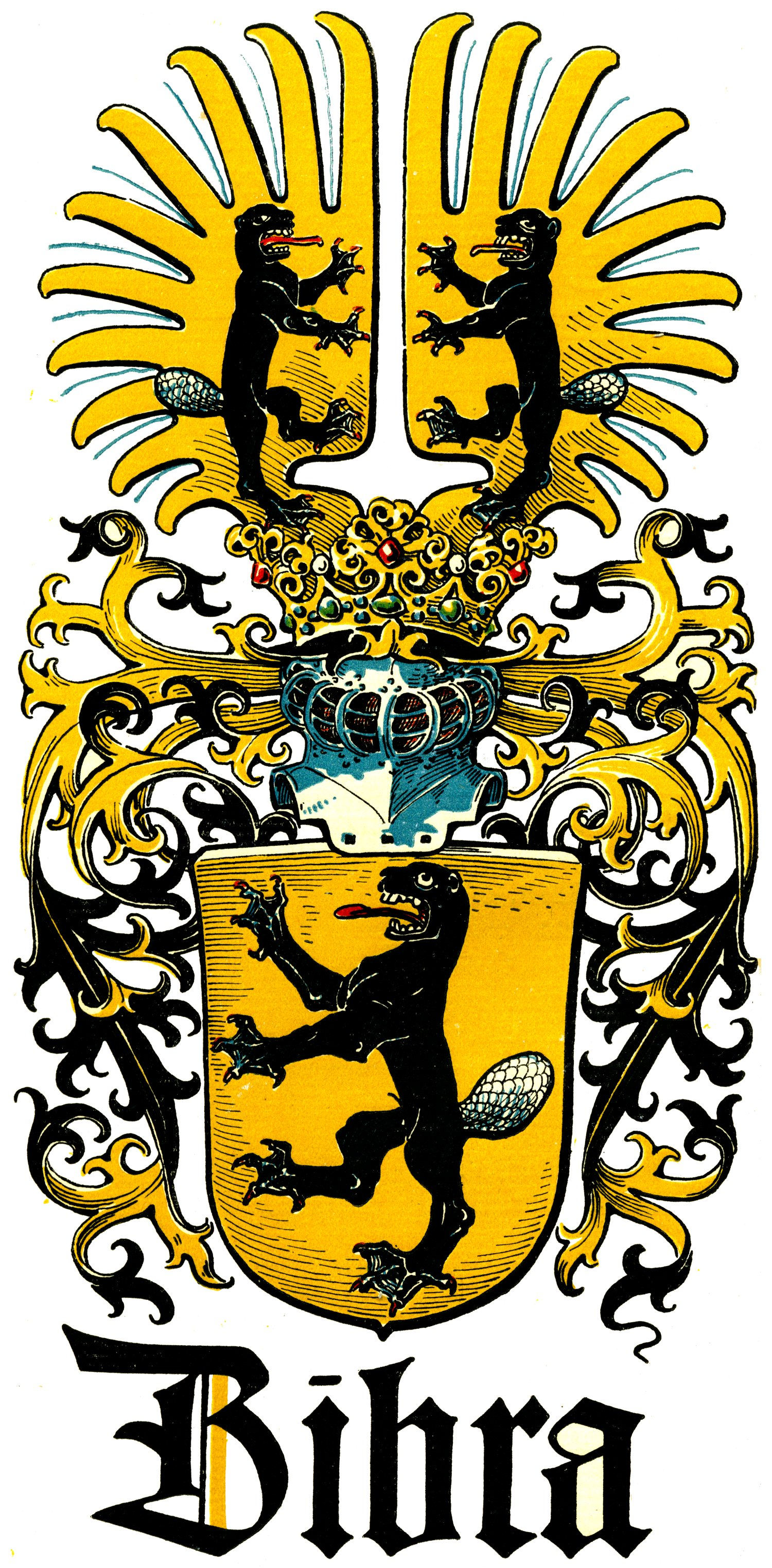
- Ancestral arms of Bibra
- Country: Holy Roman Empire; Kingdom of Bavaria; Austro Hungarian Empire
- Origin: Duchy of Franconia
- Founded: 1119, 1151
- Titles: Reichsritter (Imperial Knights); Imperial Baron; Bavarian Barons, Bohemian (part of the Austrian Empire) Barons; Prince-Bishop of Würzburg, Duke in Franconia (1495–1519), (1540–1544); Prince-Bishop, Prince-Abbot of Fulda, Archchancellor (Erzkanzler) of the Holy Roman Empress (1759–1788); Erbuntermarschallamt (hereditary Under-Marshal office) of Prince-Bishopric of Würzburg (1357 – 1803); Erbuntertruchsess (hereditary Under-Seneschal office) of the Prince-Bishopric of Bamberg (1721 - 1803)

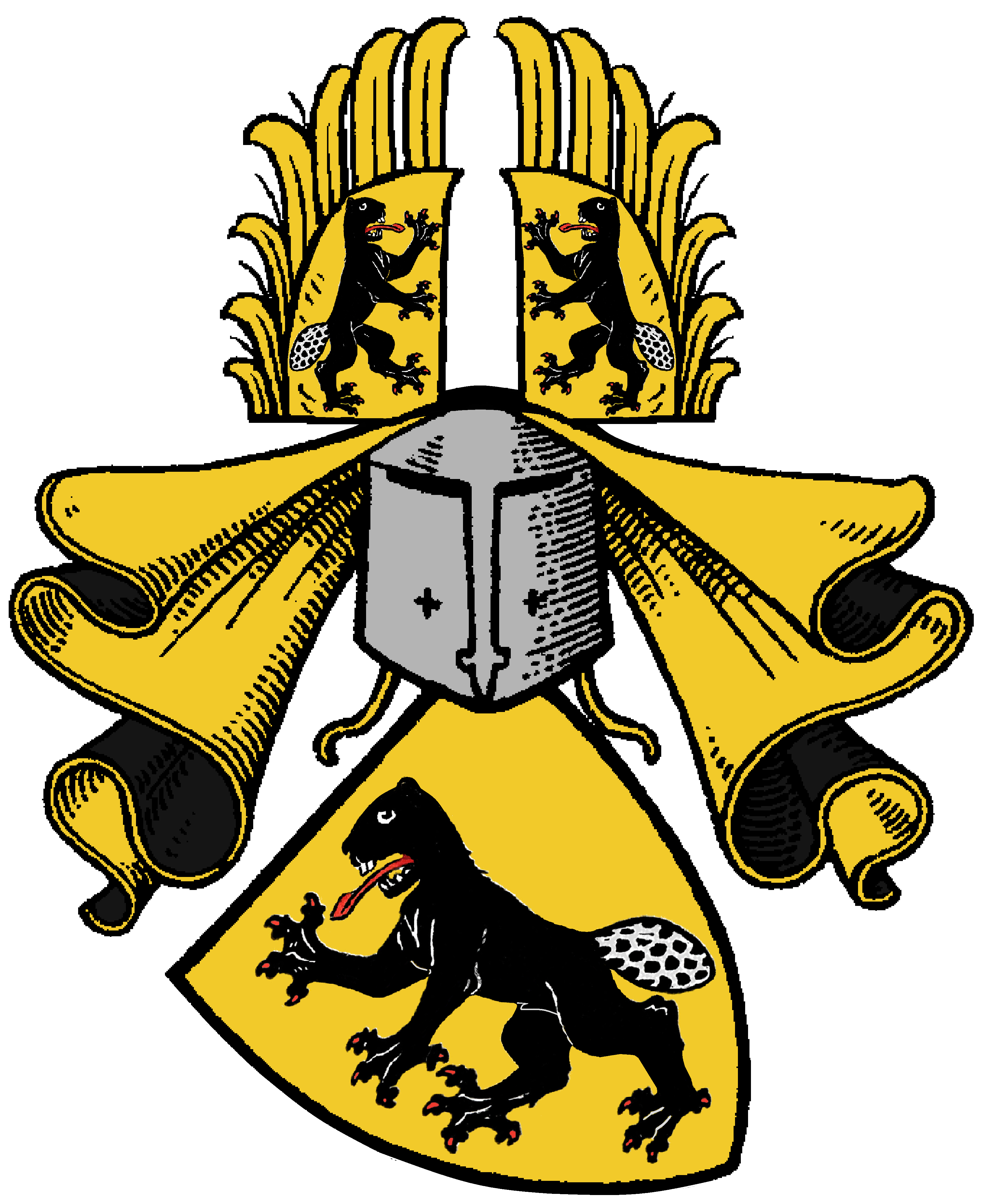
Bibra coat of arms, gothic style

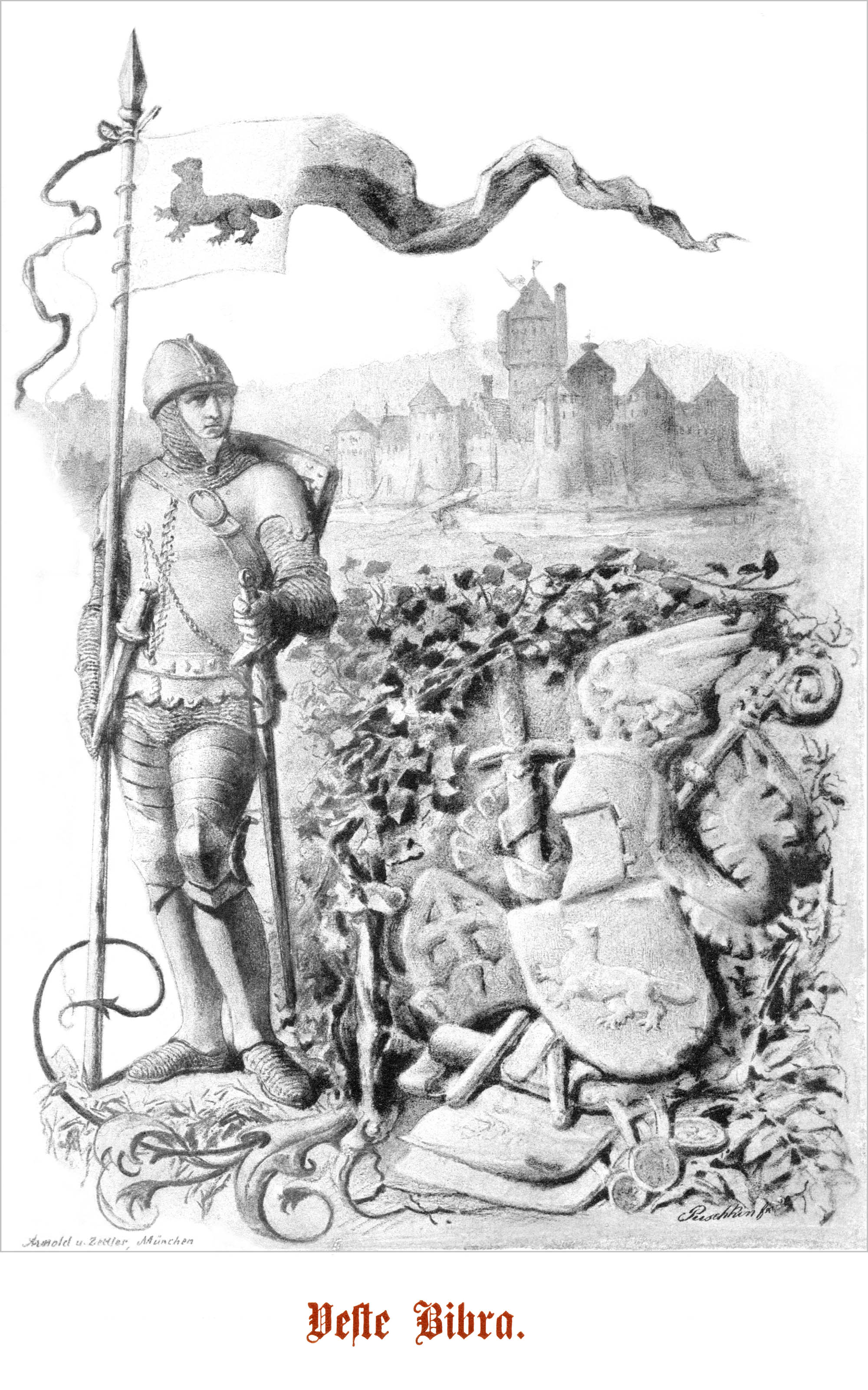
Representation of a Bibra knight in front of the castle Bibra

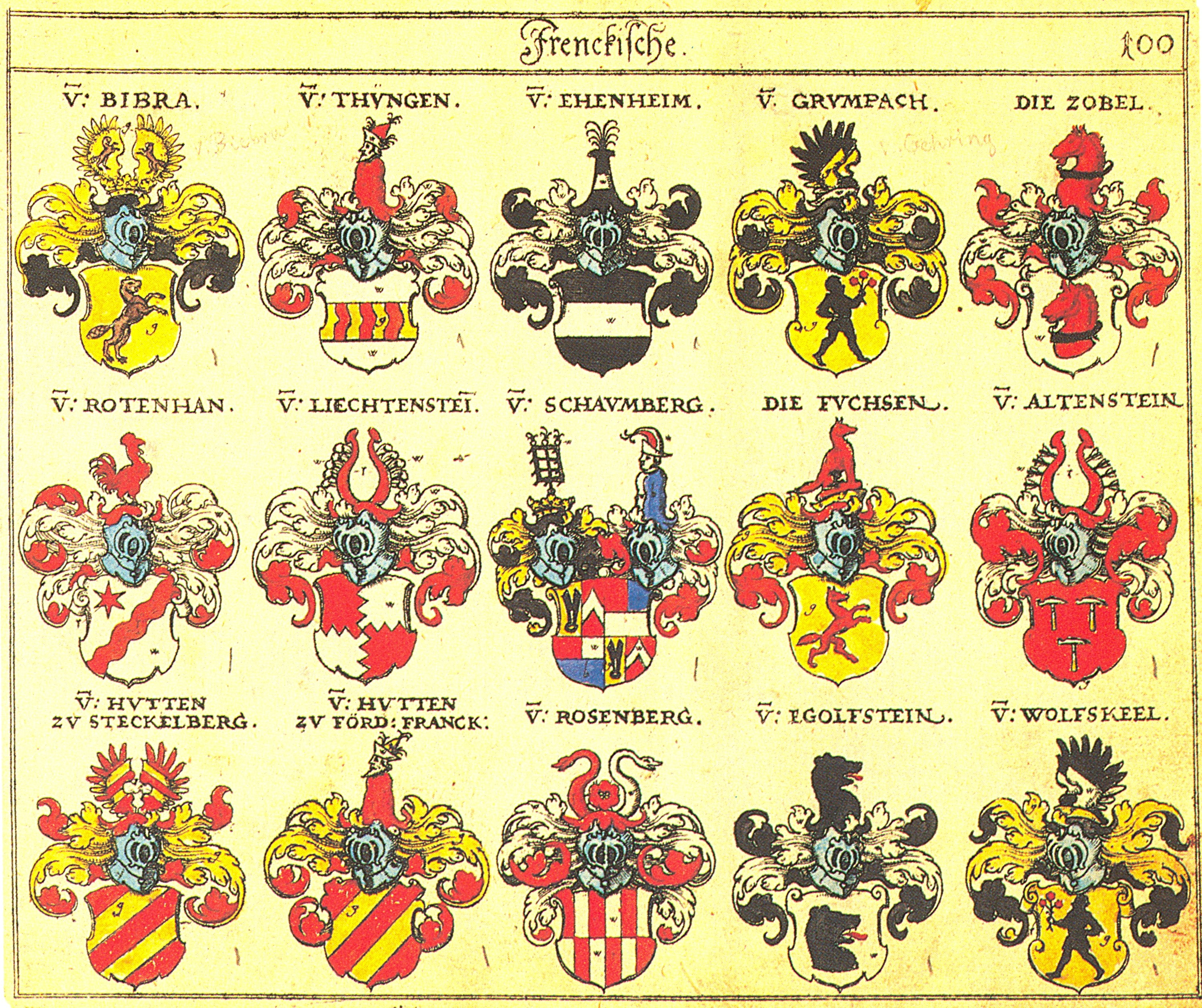
Siebmachers Wappenbuch of 1605, listing the Bibra family as the most important family of Franconia under the rank of Freiherr (Baron)

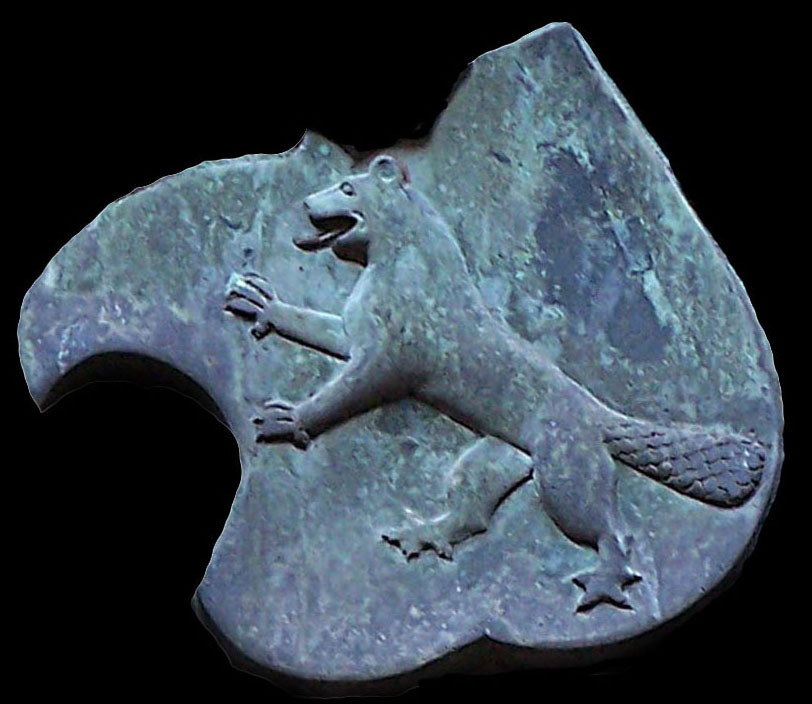
Detail of bronze coat of arms by Peter Vischer

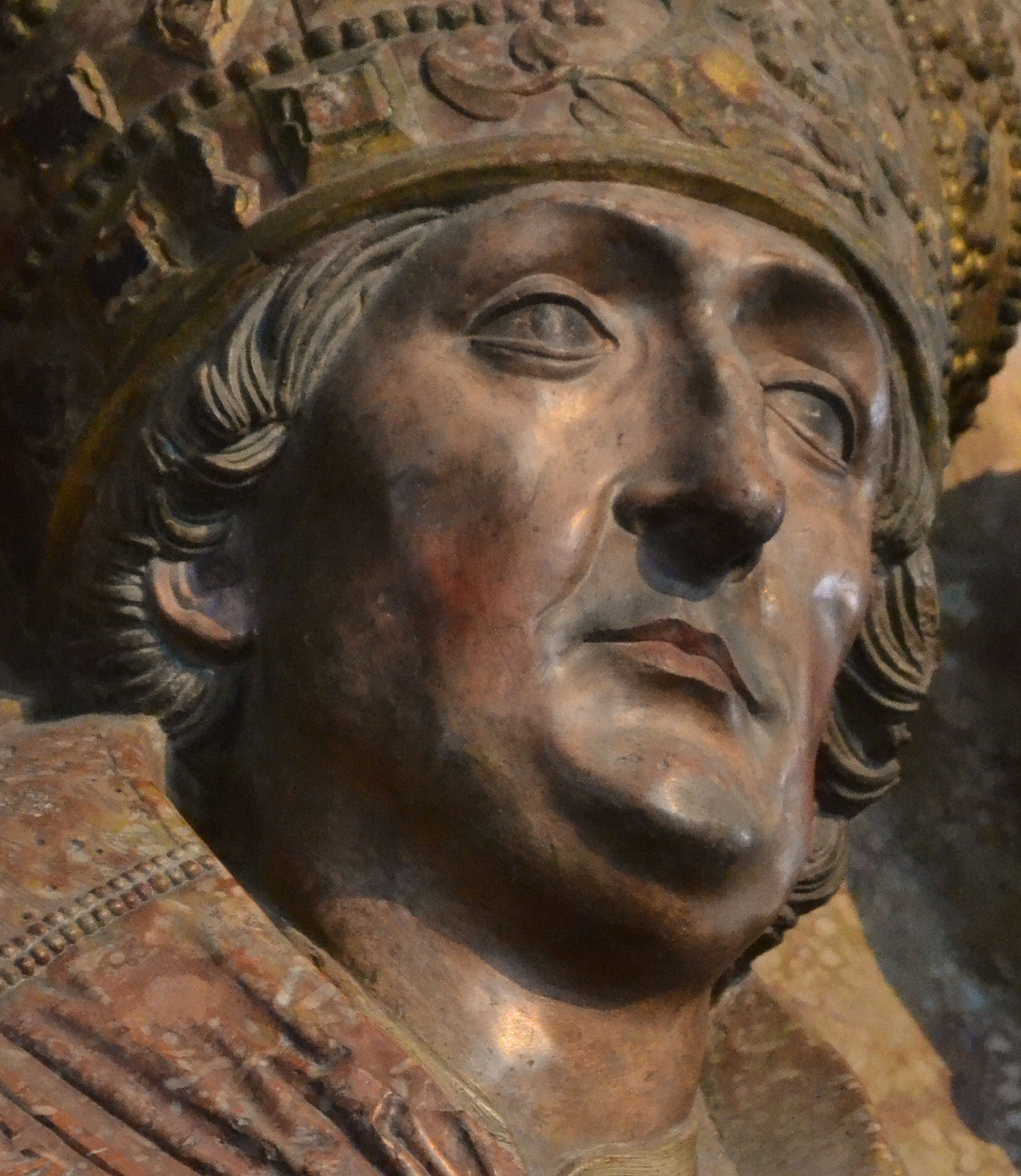
Prince-Bishop Lorenz von Bibra, detail of tomb by Tilman Riemenschneider in Würzburg Dom (cathedral)

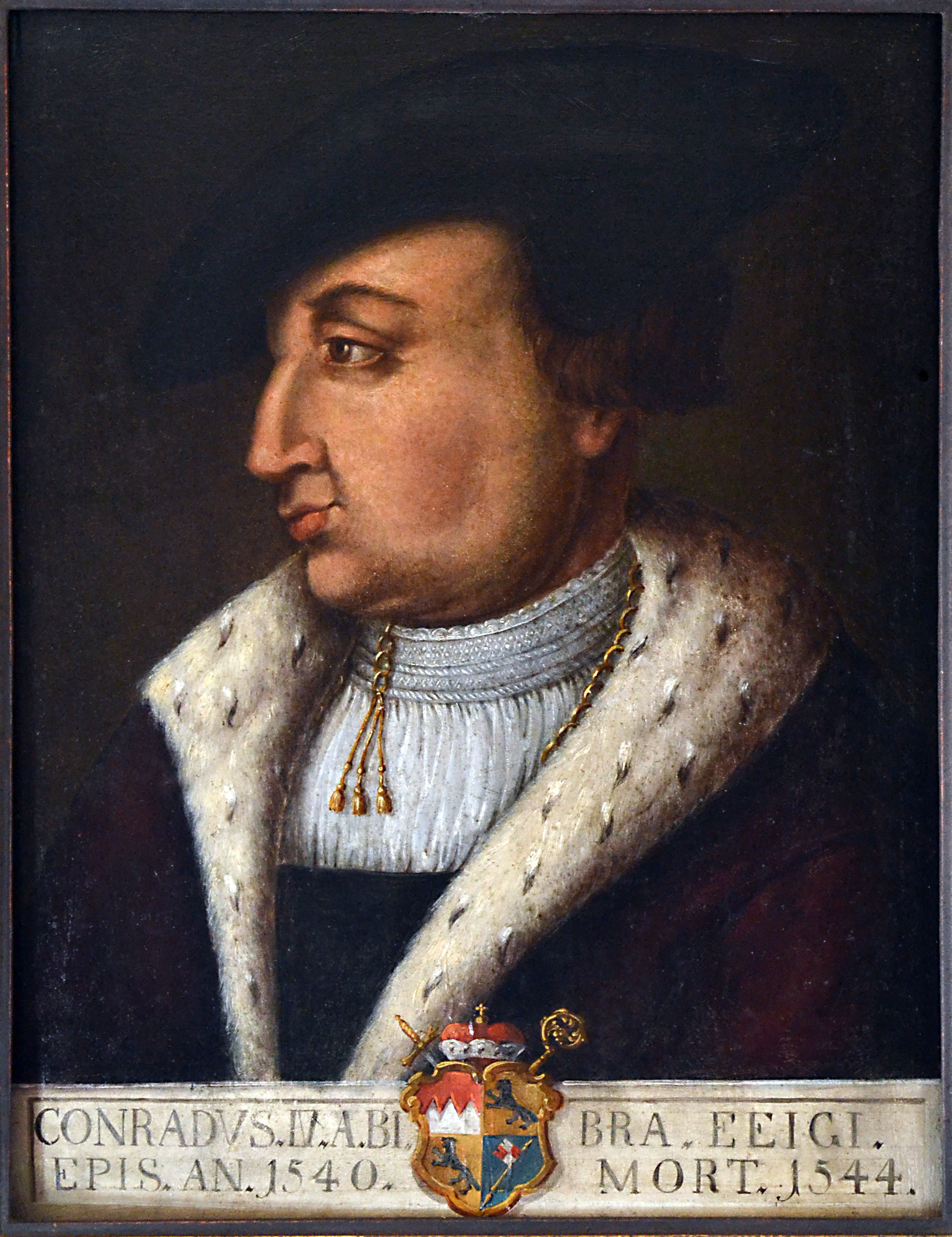
Prince-Bishop Conrad von Bibra

Prince-Bishop Heinrich von Bibra by his court painter, Johann Andreas Herrlein

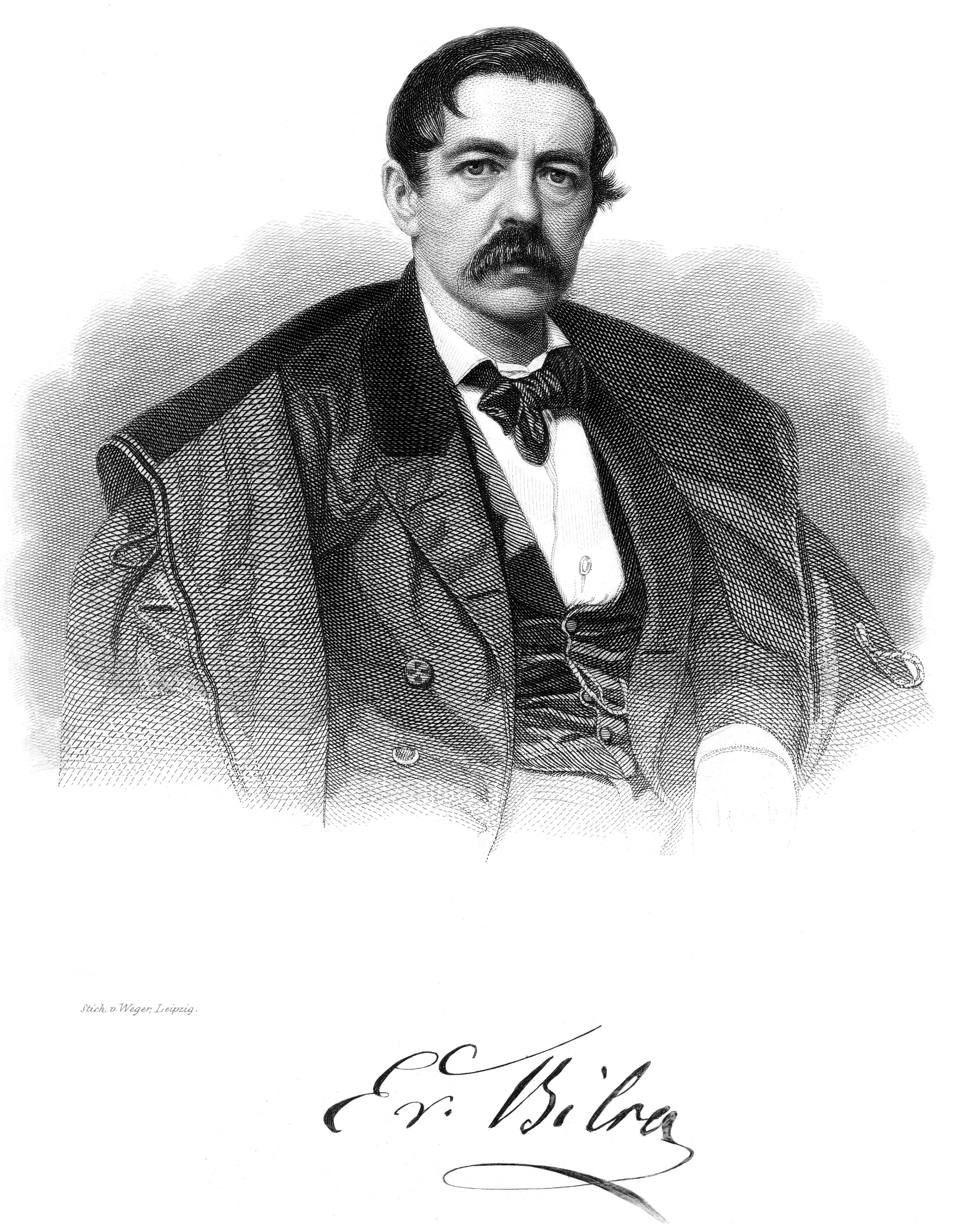
Ernst von Bibra

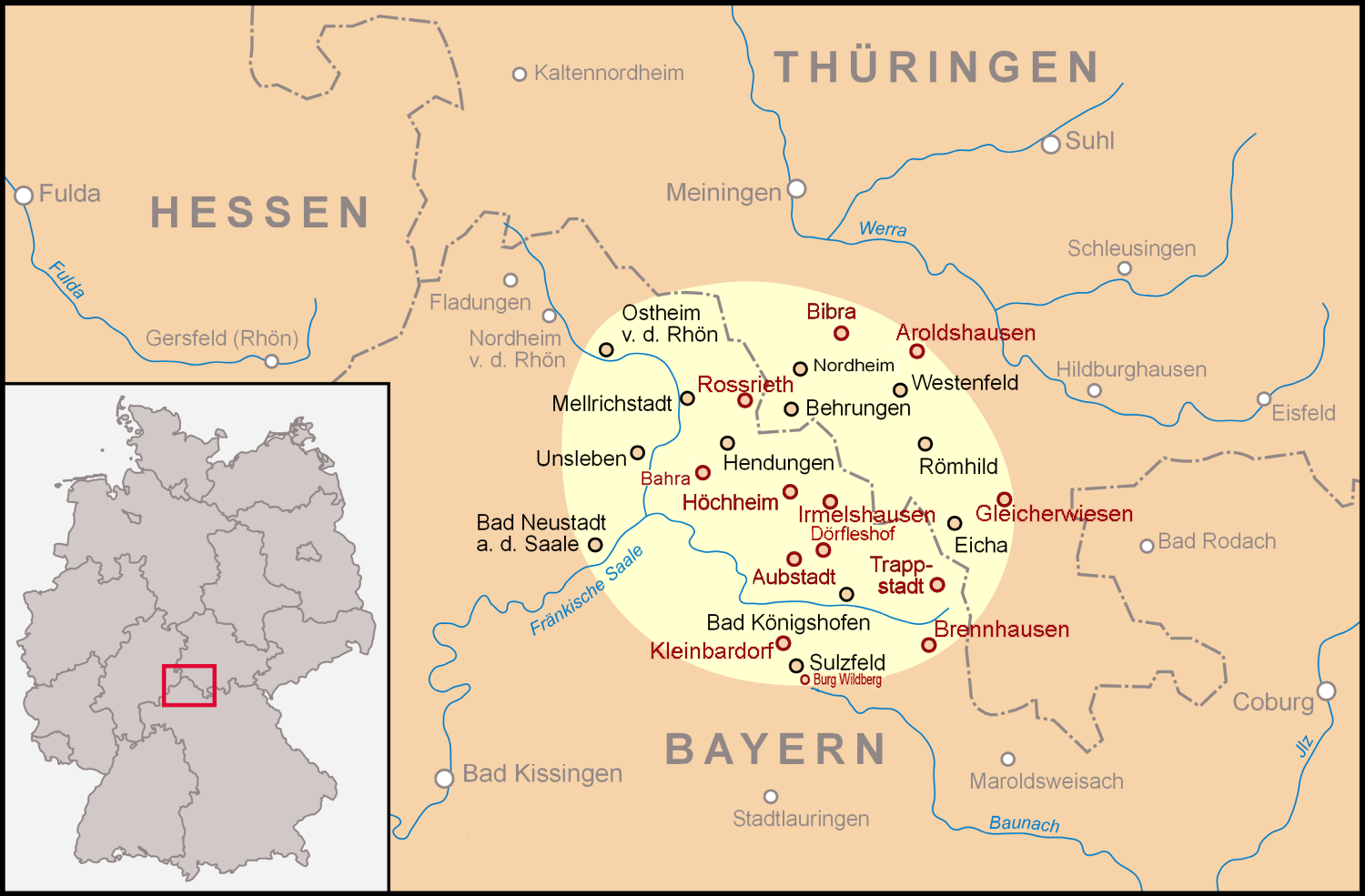
Map of Grabfeld showing localities with strong Bibra family ties

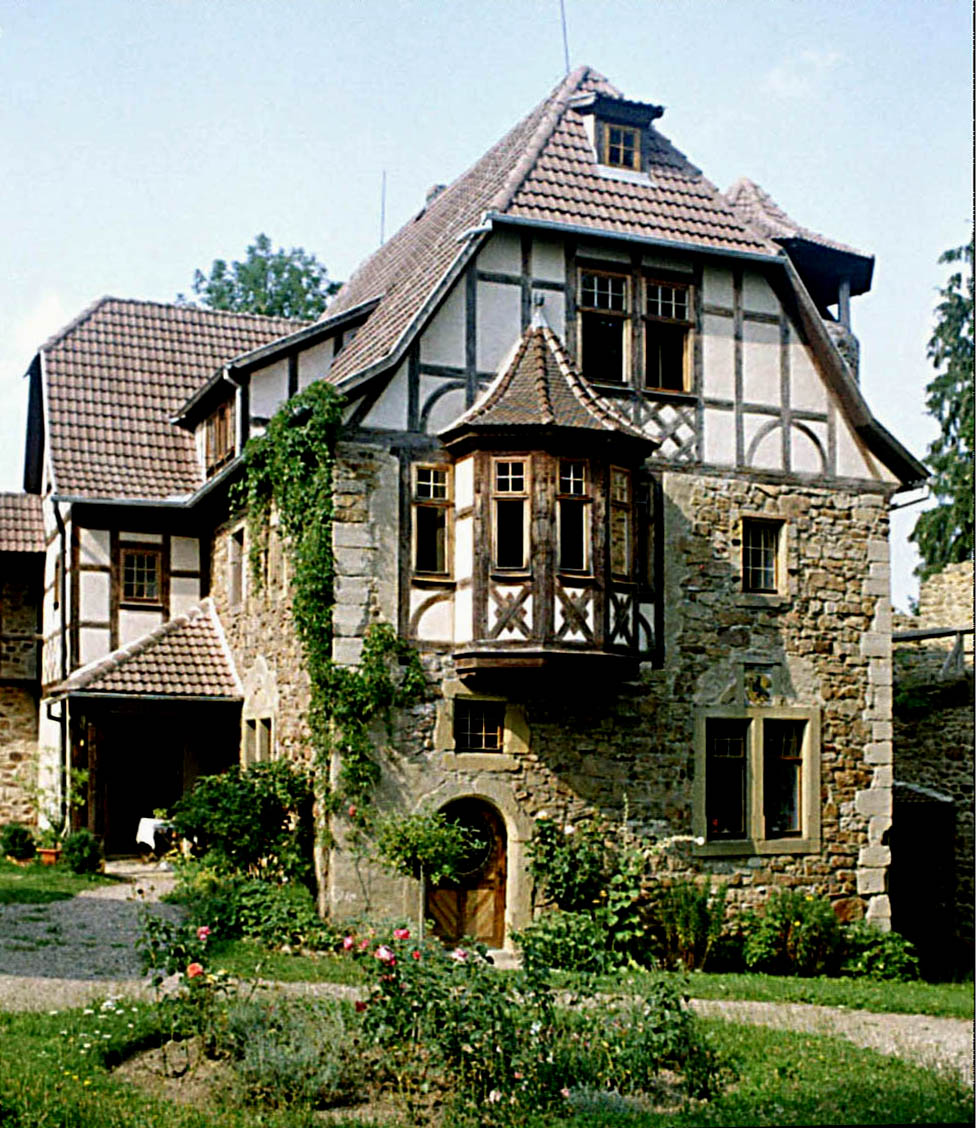
Burg Bibra

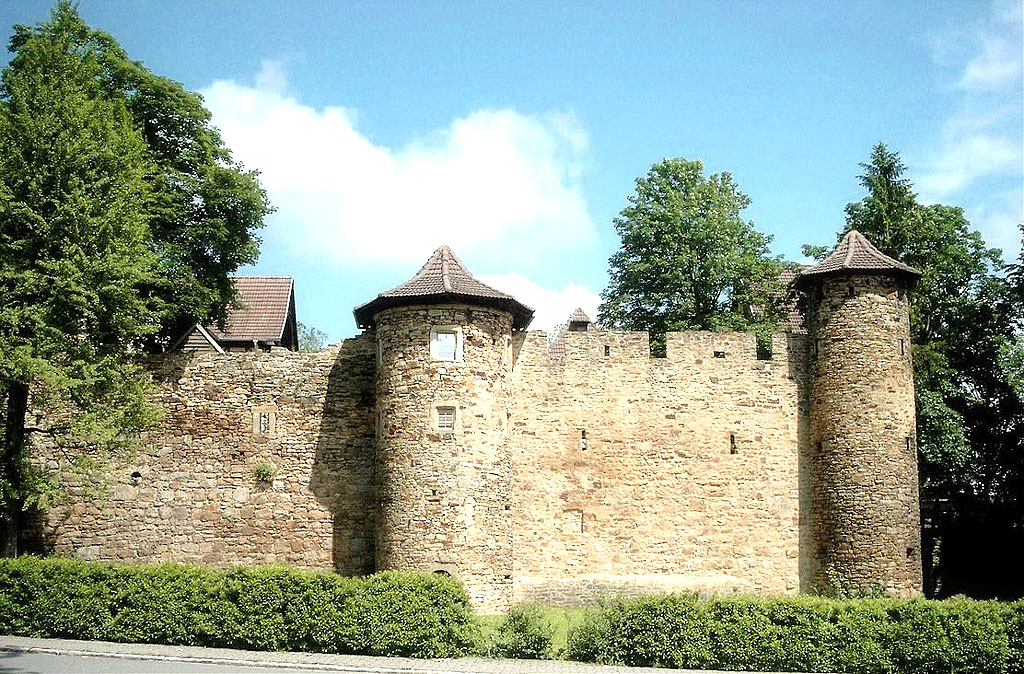
Bibra

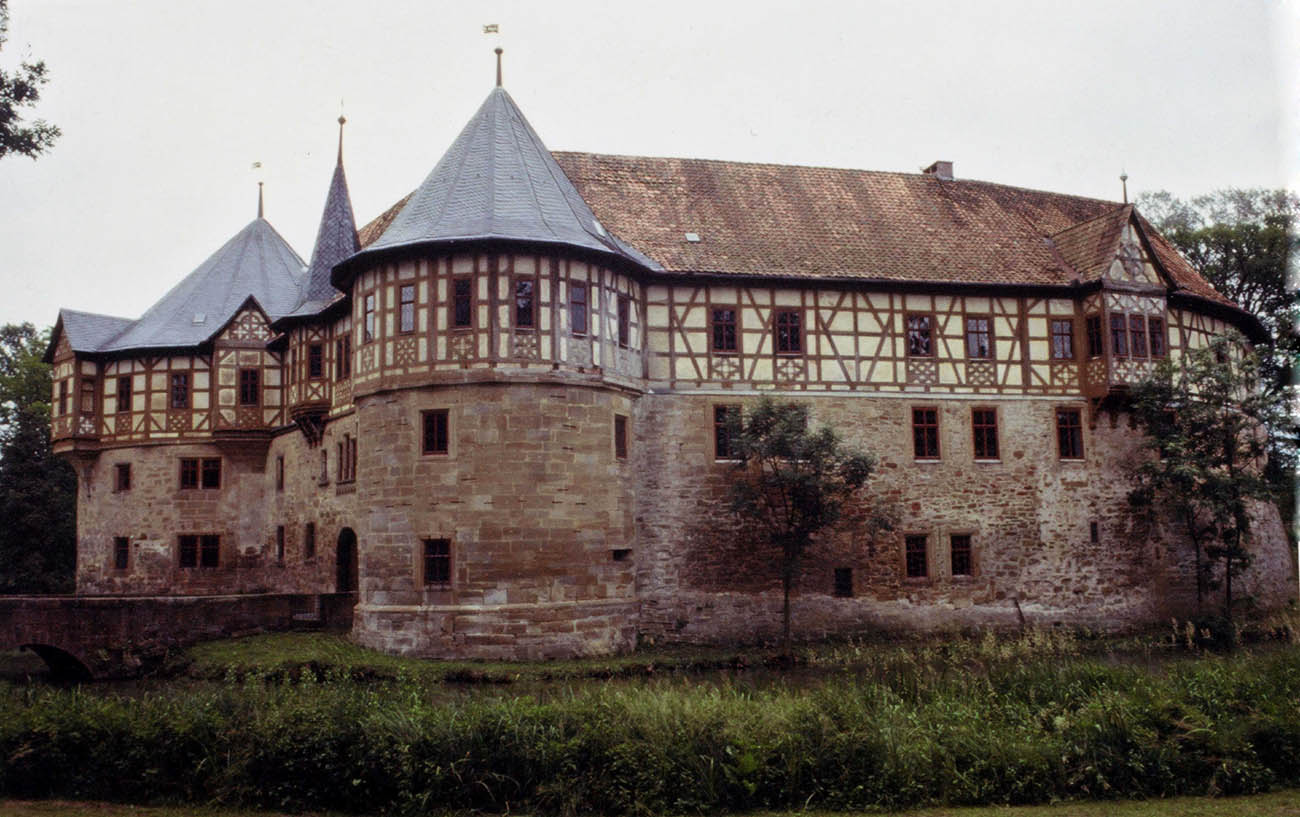
Irmelshausen

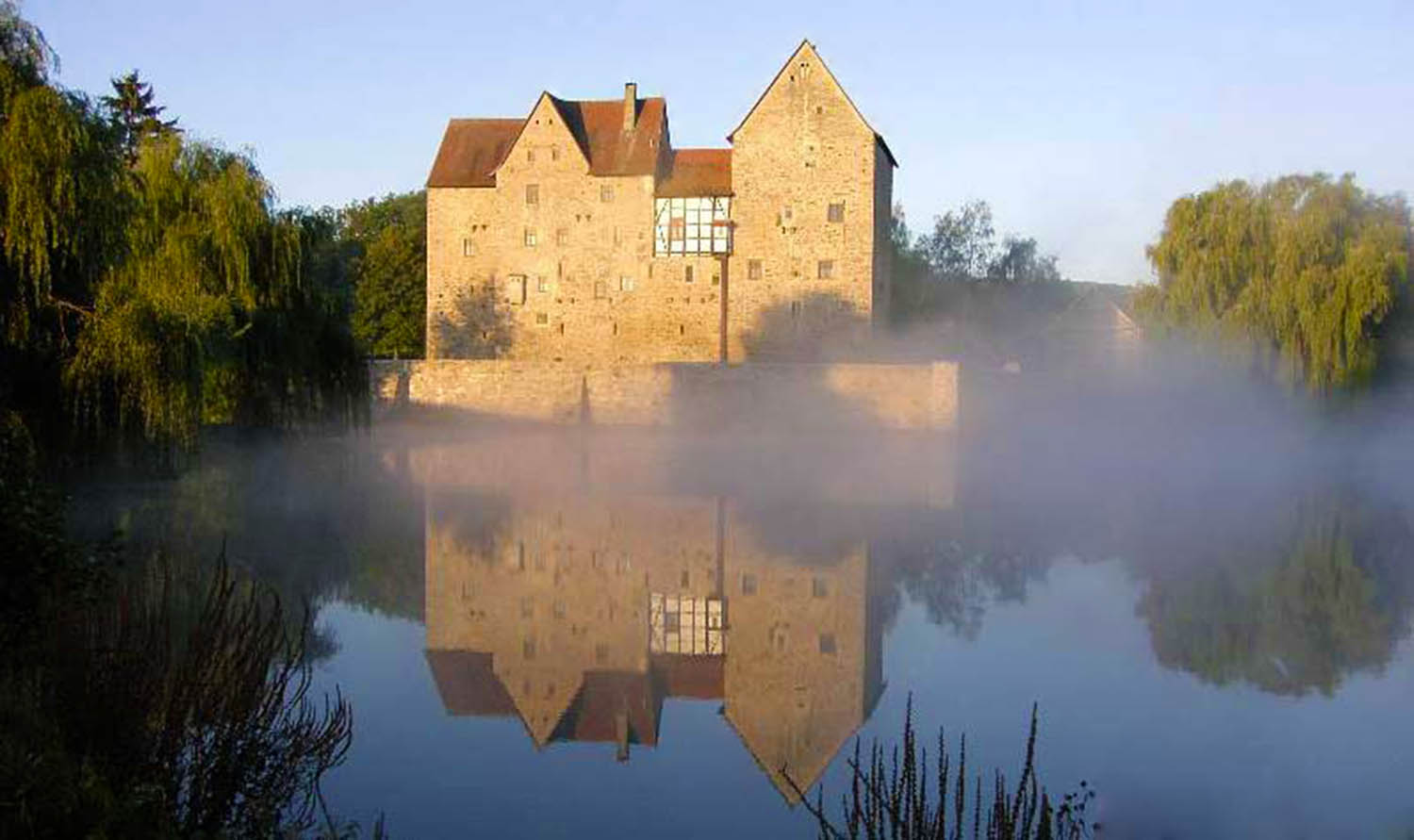
Brennhausen

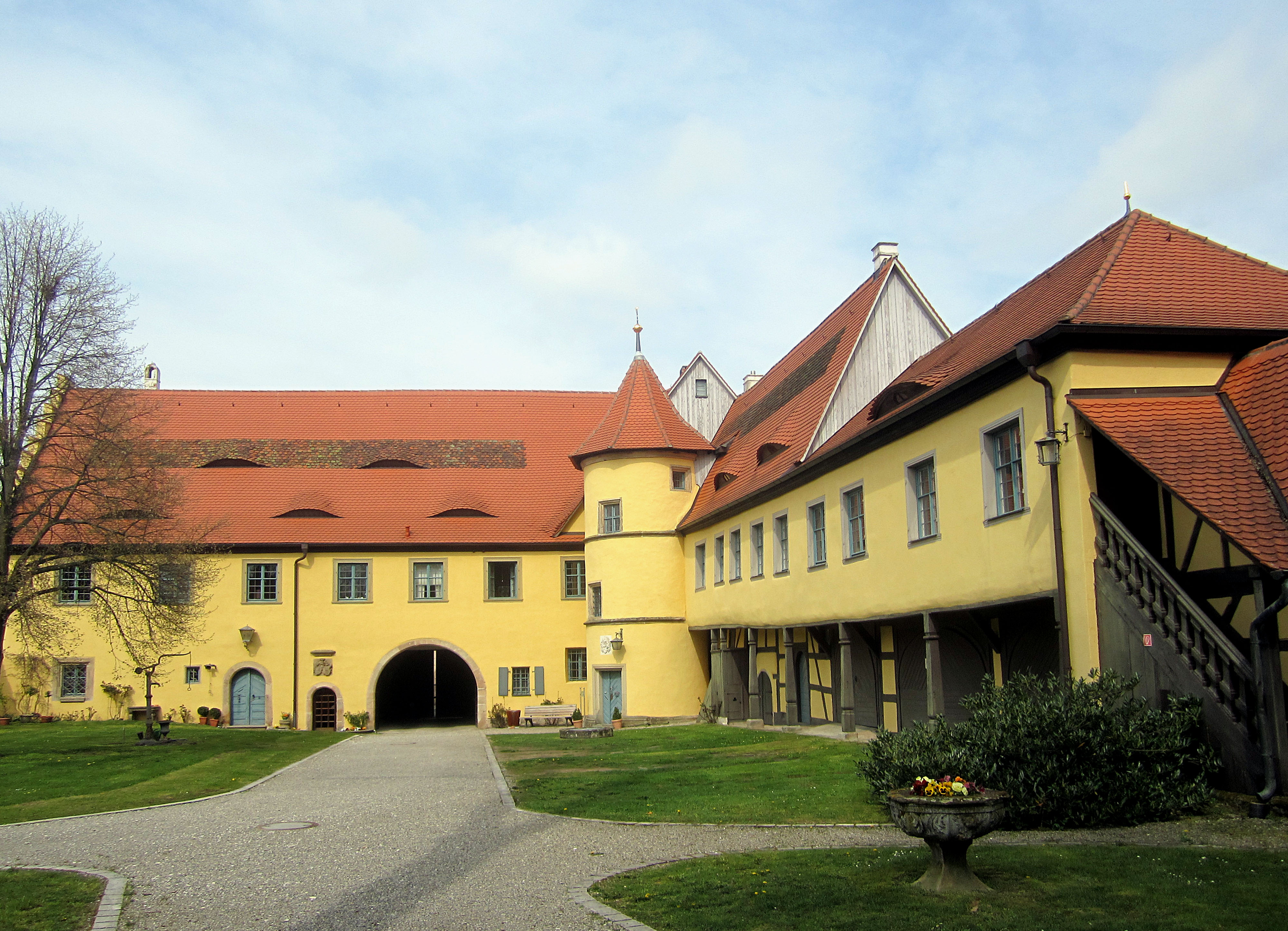
Castle Adelsdorf

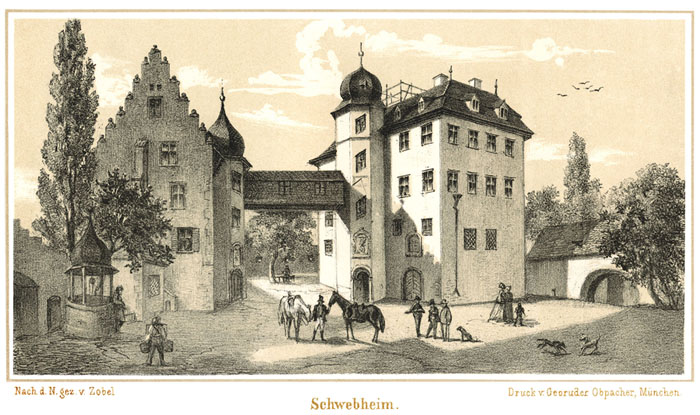
Castle at Schwebheim in 1870 engraving

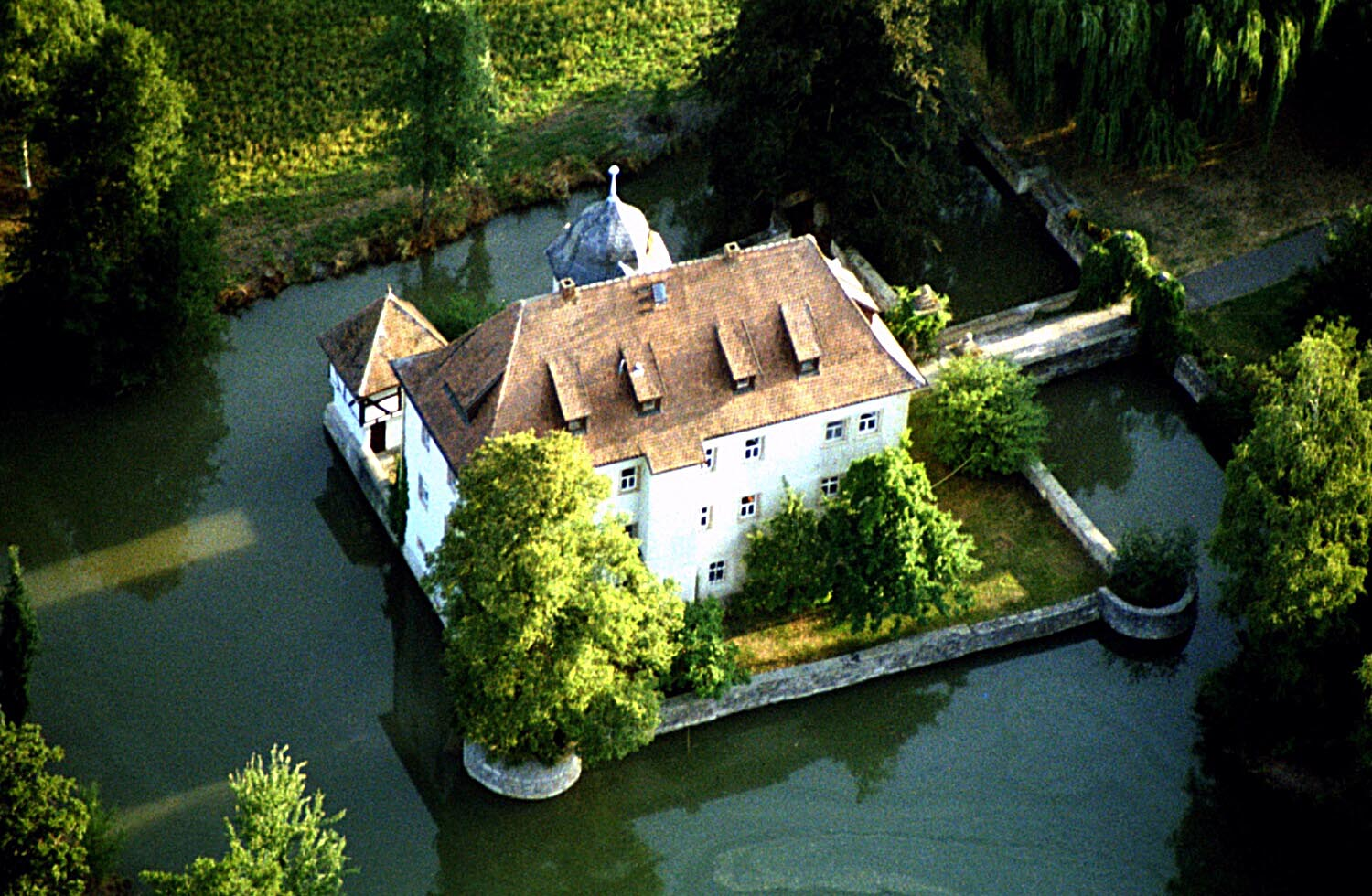
Schloss Kleinbardorf

The House of Bibra (German: [ˈbiːbʁa]) was one of the leading Uradel (ancient noble) families in Franconia (northern part of Bavaria) and present day Thuringia from the mid-15th century to about 1600. Later on the family rose from Reichsritter (Imperial Knights) to Reichsfreiherr (barons of the Holy Roman Empire). After the Holy Roman Empire dissolved, they were made Freiherr (barons) of Bavaria and Bohemia.

== History ==
The earliest references to the family include a document of Bishop Otto of Bamberg from the year 1119 of a Rupertus de Bibra. In 1151 a Pertholdus (Berthold) de Bibra and his sons Pertholdus (Berthold) and Tagino are referenced in another document. The family prospered in numbers, wealth, and influence in the 15th century and early 16th century. By the time of Siebmachers Wappenbuch of 1605, the family is listed as the most important family of Franconia under the rank of Freiherr. By 1600 most of the family died off without heirs partially due natural causes such as the Bubonic plague and the number of family members who took church positions. After the death of Heinrich von Bibra in 1602, the Prince-Bishop Julius Echter von Mespelbrunn seized most of the family’s assets as part of the Counter-Reformation resulting in a 79-year lawsuit. The lawsuit (Reichskammergericht) was eventually settled with the family receiving all the properties except Burgwallbach but without income during the suit. From 1602 on there were many important members of the family but the family itself never recovered the leading position it previously had in the late 15th and 16th centuries. Between 1698 and 1772, the various lines were raised to Reichsfreiherr (Barons of the Holy Roman Empire). In later times, the family spread to the Austrian Empire, the British Empire, and the United States. According to Wagenhöfer, the Bibra family is the most researched family of the low nobility in Franconia after the Guttenberg and Seckendorff families.

== Prominent members of the family ==
- Kilian von Bibra (* about 1425; † 1494), 1 December 1450 Gilianus de Bibrach de Alemania receives doctorate in church law (doctoratus in iure canonico) in Padua, Italy, Dean of the Cathedral Chapter of Würzburg, Generalvicar of Bishopric of Würzburg, statesman (German Wikipedia article)
- Wilhelm von Bibra (*1442 † 1490), Lorenz' half brother, Papal emissary, Knight of the Golden Spur
- Albrecht von Bibra (* † 1511), Dean of the Cathedral Chapter of Würzburg, Cathedral Chapter member of Bamberg (German Wikipedia article)
- Lorenz von Bibra, Prince-Bishop of Würzburg, Duke in Franconia (1459–1519)
- Conrad von Bibra, Prince-Bishop of Würzburg, Duke in Franconia (1490–1544)
- Christoph Erhard von Bibra (1656–1706) participant at Battle of Blenheim, 12.10.1704 kaiserlicher (imperial) Generalfeldwachtmeister, 2.5.1705 (Elector of Mainz) Generalfeldmarschalleutnant (Lieutenant General), Commander of the Plassenburg and Kulmbach (German Wikipedia article)
- Johann Ernst von Bibra (10.2.1662 – 19.8.1705) 12.4.1701 kaiserlicher (imperial) Feldmarschall-Leutnant, 11.5.1704 Reichsgeneralfeldmarschallleutnant, 20.5.1704 kaiserlicher (imperial) Feldzeugmeister (German Wikipedia article)
- Heinrich Carl von Bibra (aka Karl Siegmund) (1666 + 1734) Franconian Circles, Bamberg Generalfeldmarschalleutnant (Lieutenant General), father Prince-Bishop Heinrich of Fulda, builder of the Bibra Palais in Bamberg (German Wikipedia article)
- Heinrich von Bibra, (Karl Sigmund Frhr. von Bibra) Prince-Bishop, Prince-Abbot of Fulda (1711–1788) was Prince-Bishop from (1759–1788)
- Siegmund von Bibra (Philipp Anton Frhr. von Bibra; * 1750; † 1803), high official Bishopric and Abby of Fulda and editor of Journal von und für Deutschland (German Wikipedia article)
- Franz Ludwig von Bibra (1783–1823) was soldier, author, and early settler of Tasmania, Australia.
- Ernst von Bibra (1806–1878), German naturalist (natural history scientist) and author. Ernst was a botanist, zoologist, metallurgist, chemist, geographer, travel writer, novelist, duellist, art collector and trailblazer in ethnopsychopharmacology.
- Ernst Wilhelm Freiherr von Bibra (1910–1943) German officer during World War II and recipient of the Knight's Cross of the Iron Cross. Missing presumed dead since February 15, 1943 - Oktjabersky, Russia
- August von Bibra (1808–1894) general manager of the Adelsverein, or Verein zum Schutze Deutscher Einwanderer in Texas ("Society for the Protection of German Immigrants in Texas").
- Wilhelm Franz von Bibra (1824–1879) Generalfeldmarschalleutnant (Lieutenant General) Austro-Hungarian Army (German Wikipedia article)
- August Hans Karl Reinhard von Bibra (1845-1926) Oberst (colonel), (K. u. K.) and historian
- Sir Eric Ernest von Bibra (O.B.E., Kt.) (1895–1958) Order of the British Empire (1938) for services to local government and returned servicemen, Knight Bachelor (7 July 1953) Agent-General for Tasmania in Britain, former Alderman and Mayor of Launceston
- Sir Donald Dean von Bibra (C.M.G., O.B.E., K.B.) (1905–1982) Order of the British Empire (1970), Companion of the Order of St Michael and St George(1979), Knight Bachelor (1982): former chairman of the Australian Wool Industry Conference and Tasmanian grazier
- Eve von Bibra living actress and singer active in Australia
- Nikolaus von Bibra, 13th-century Erfurt monk, is unknown whether he is connected to the same von Bibra family. Listed under theology and satire, he wrote a comment on contemporary politics known as Occultus Erfordensis and a satirical work called Carmen Satiricum. (German Wikipedia article)

== Riemenschneider patronage ==
The tomb of Lorenz von Bibra by Tilman Riemenschneider (c. 1460 – 7 July 1531) in the Würzburg Dom (cathedral) is one of Riemenschneider's most famous works. Lorenz also commissioned Riemenscheider to do the tomb of his predecessor, Rudolf von Scherenberg. In Bibra the family commissioned Riemenschneider to do the Altar of the Apostles, Altar of the Church Fathers, Altar of the Annunciation, Carving of St. Kilian, a crucifix, and an epitaph of Hans von Bibra (Lorenz' father). Kilian von Bibra also commissioned a work by Riemenscheider other than at Bibra.

== Localities associated with family ==
Family seat (Stammsitz):

- Burg Bibra near Meiningen (c.1100–present) is reportedly the longest continuously owned castle by a family in Thuringia having been in the family since written records began including during the East German period. While the burg itself remained in the family, the forest, farmland and Lower Castle was sold at auction in 1936.

Second seat:

- Schloss Irmelshausen (1376–present) is a five sided water castle in Franconia, frequently featured in books and calendars.

Historical holdings still in family:

- Schloss Brennhausen (1681–present) is a unique and beautifully situated castle frequently featured in books and calendars. In 2002 transferred to the Stiftung Brennhausen (Foundation) by the family which continues to use.
- Dörfleshof farming estate (between Aubstadt and Ottelmannshausen)(1859–present)

Estates, castles, manor houses, and villages that previously came under Bibra control (Germany unless otherwise stated):

- Schloss Adelsdorf (1687–1993) widow continued to live there until 2017
- Althausen (Bad Königshofen im Grabfeld) (1331-1517+)
- Schloss Aschach (1391–1407)
- Aroldshausen (by Jüchsen) (c.1435-c.1990) property taken by East Germany, compensation adjudicated about 1990
- Aubstadt (c.1308-after 1859)
- Bahra (1404–1637?)
- Bauerbach (by 1359-1684)
- Unteres Schloss (Lower Castle) also known as Neues Schloss (New Castle) built at Bibra after the partial destruction of Burg Bibra in 1525 (1558-1936)
- Burg Bramberg (1393–1483) pledge holding (Pfandschaft)
- Breuberg (Welkershausen by Meiningen) (1779–?)
- Schloss Burgwallbach (1489–1681)
- Oberschloss Euerbach
- Untereuerheim & Obereuerheim with Schloss Euerburg (1480–1687)
- Schloss Gemünda (by Seßlach) (1510–1655)
- Geroda (1400–1607)
- Gleicherwiesen (c.1356 – 1850)
- Burg Hallenburg (before 1374–1391)
- Höchheim (1356-c1970)
- Schloss Kleinbardorf (1413–1687) (see also Jewish Cemetery (Kleinbardorf))
- Neubrunn (Thuringia) (1366-1496+)
- Schloss Oselce (Schloss Wosseletz) (Czech Republic) (1808–1856)
- Burg Osterburg and half Amt Themar (1380–1468) Pledge Holding
- Rentwertshausen (1372–1511)
- Schloss Roßrieth (by Mellrichstadt) (1438-before 1445)(1589–1680)
- Schloss Schnabelwaid (1696–1750)
- Schwarza (Thuringian Forest) (1355–1425) pledge holding (Pfandschaft)
- Schloss Schwebheim (1513-c1958)
- Schloss Senftenberg (Buttenheim) (1426–1484) pledge holding (Pfandschaft) Castle and administrative area (Amt) including Altendorf, Buckenhofen, Buttenheim, Eggolsheim, Friesen, Grub, Kalteneggolsfeld, Kauernhofen, Pautzfeld, Schirnaidel, Seigendorf, Seußling and Stackendorf
- Steinach an der Saale (1343 – ?) combination of fief and pledge
- Schloss Strauch (Großenhain) (1749–1755)
- Schloss Trappstadt (1853– c.1970)
- Burg Trimburg (1375–1412) pledge holding
- Walldorf (by Meinigen) (1779–1946) property taken by Russians or East Germans in 1946
- Schloss Weisendorf (c1750-1785)
- Schloss Wiesen, (Seßlach) 1818–1822
- Veste Wildberg and Amt (administrative district consisting of Eyershausen, Großbardorf, Großeibstadt, Großwenkheim, Kleinbardorf, Kleineibstadt, Saal an der Saale, Weichtungen, Wülfershausen a. d. Saale ) (1358 – before 1387) pledge holding, (? – 1687) fief without Amt (?) (1602–1681 part of lawsuit with bishop of Würzburg)
- Schloss Willershausen (half 1757–1850)
- Wölfershausen (Kr. Meinigen) (1311 - after 1500)
- Wolfmannshausen (Kr. Meinigen) (1372- after 1496)
- Wülfershausen (Lkr Schweinfurt) (1401-?)
- Wülfershausen a. d. Saale (1418-?) Separately from Amt Wildberg above

German cities with close association:

- Fulda
- Bamberg
- Würzburg

Memorials:

- Bibra Kreuz – A memorial to fallen WWI soldier Helmuth von Bibra from the Irmelshausen Senior Sub-line in Sachsen-Anhalt, Germany German Wikipedia Article

Monasteries closely associated with Bibra family:

- Rohr (just north of Meiningen) during the 14th century (last Bibra burial 1473)
- Henneberg Kloster Veßra in the 15th century (last Bibra burial 1488)

Australia

- Bibra Lake, a suburb of Perth, Australia is named after Benedict von Bibra who in the summer of 1843 bought land there which contains the lake Bibra Lake
- Bibra’s Landing in the west coast of Australia is named after Francis Louis von Bibra and/or brother Charles who operated in the area in the 1870s–90's (25.93333°S 114.2333°E)
- Beaufront, Ross, Tasmania (1916–present): a historical (1837) country home and large estate (42.06296°S 147.50961°E)

== Coats of arms of municipalities ==
The Bibra coat of arms is incorporated into several municipalities.

Gemeinde Adelsdorf

Gemeinde of Aubstadt

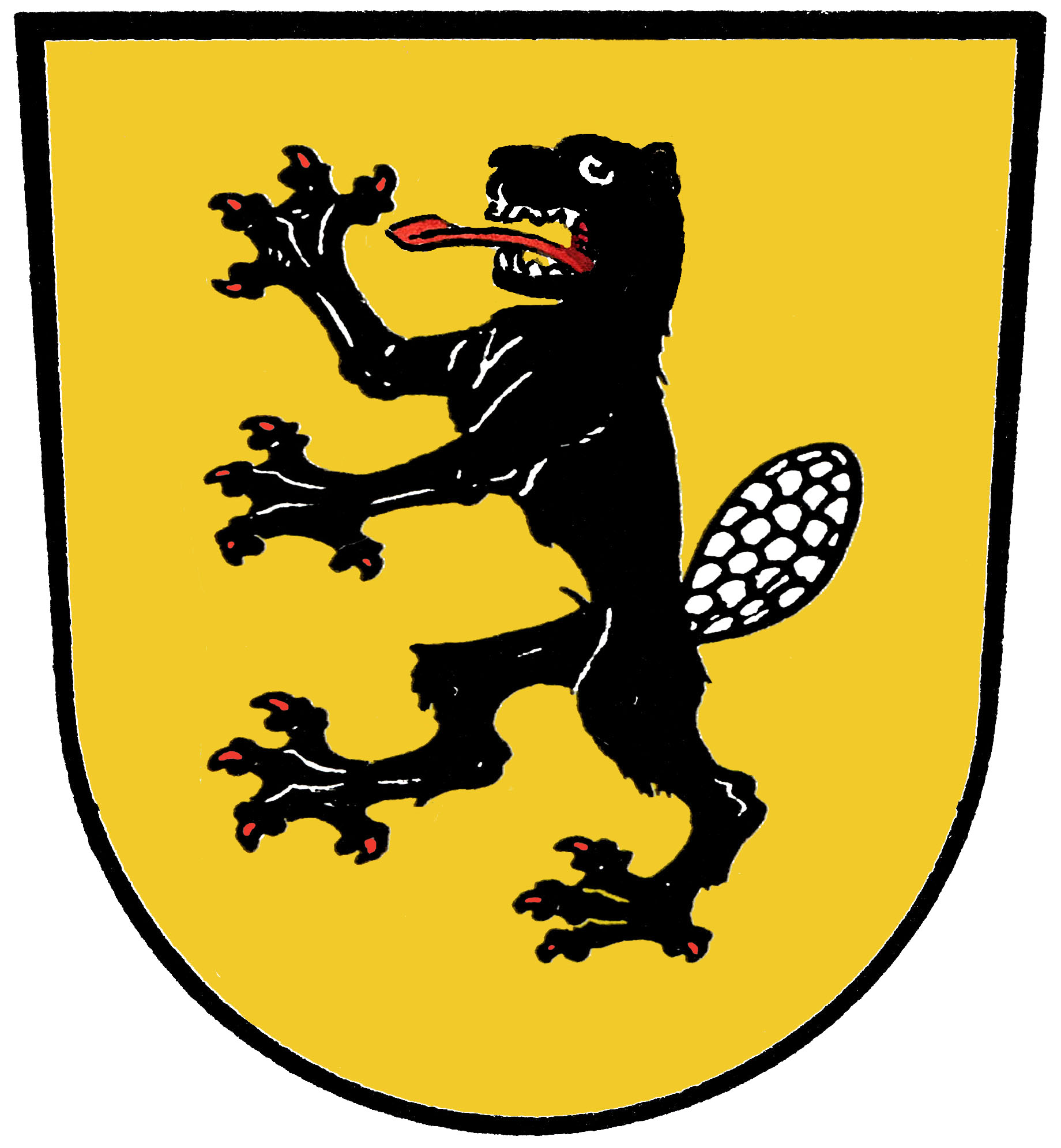
Former Gemeinde (now village) Bibra

Village of Gleicherwiesen

Gemeinde Höchheim

Village of Steinach an der Saale

== Organization of the family ==
For the last four centuries the family has divided itself between two Branches named after the two brothers whom all living Bibra descend: Valentine (1560–1595) and Bernhard (1562–1609). Within each branch, the family has divided further in Lines centered on castles and a manor house (Gleicherwiesen). The last two centuries, the Lines are as follows:

Valentine Branch

Adelsdorf Line (extinct in the male line since 1993)

Raised to Imperial Barons (Reichsfreiherr) 1698
Became Bavarian Barons 1815

Gleicherweisen Line

Raised to Imperial Barons (Reichsfreiherr) 1698
Became Bavarian Barons 1815

Schwebheim Line (extinct 1958)

Raised to Imperial Barons (Reichsfreiherr) 1698
Became Bavarian Barons 1817

Schnabelwaid, later Weisendorf Line (extinct 1856)

Raised to Imperial Barons (Reichsfreiherr) 1698
Became Bohemian (part of the Austrian Empire) Barons 1810

Bernhard Branch

Brennhausen Line

Raised to Imperial Barons (Reichsfreiherr) 1772
Became Bavarian Barons 1828

Bibra-Bibra Line

Raised to Imperial Barons (Reichsfreiherr) 1772
Became Bavarian Barons 1816

Irmelshausen Line (Older sub-line & Younger sub-line)

Raised to Imperial Barons (Reichsfreiherr) 1713
Became Bavarian Barons 1816

All branches of the family were raised to Freiherr (baron). In 1919, all nobility predicates were transformed into constituents of the family name in Germany.

== Outline of family ==
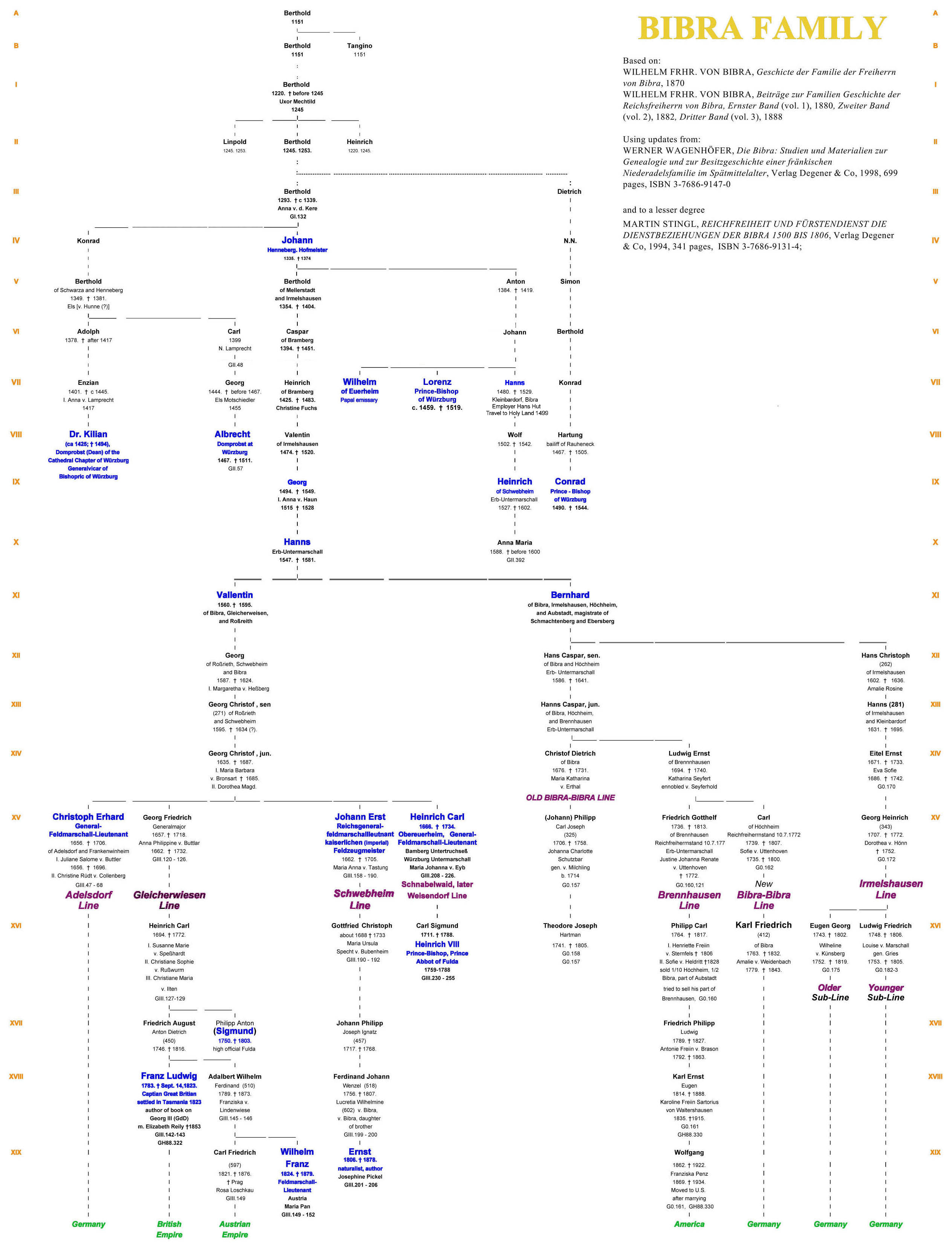

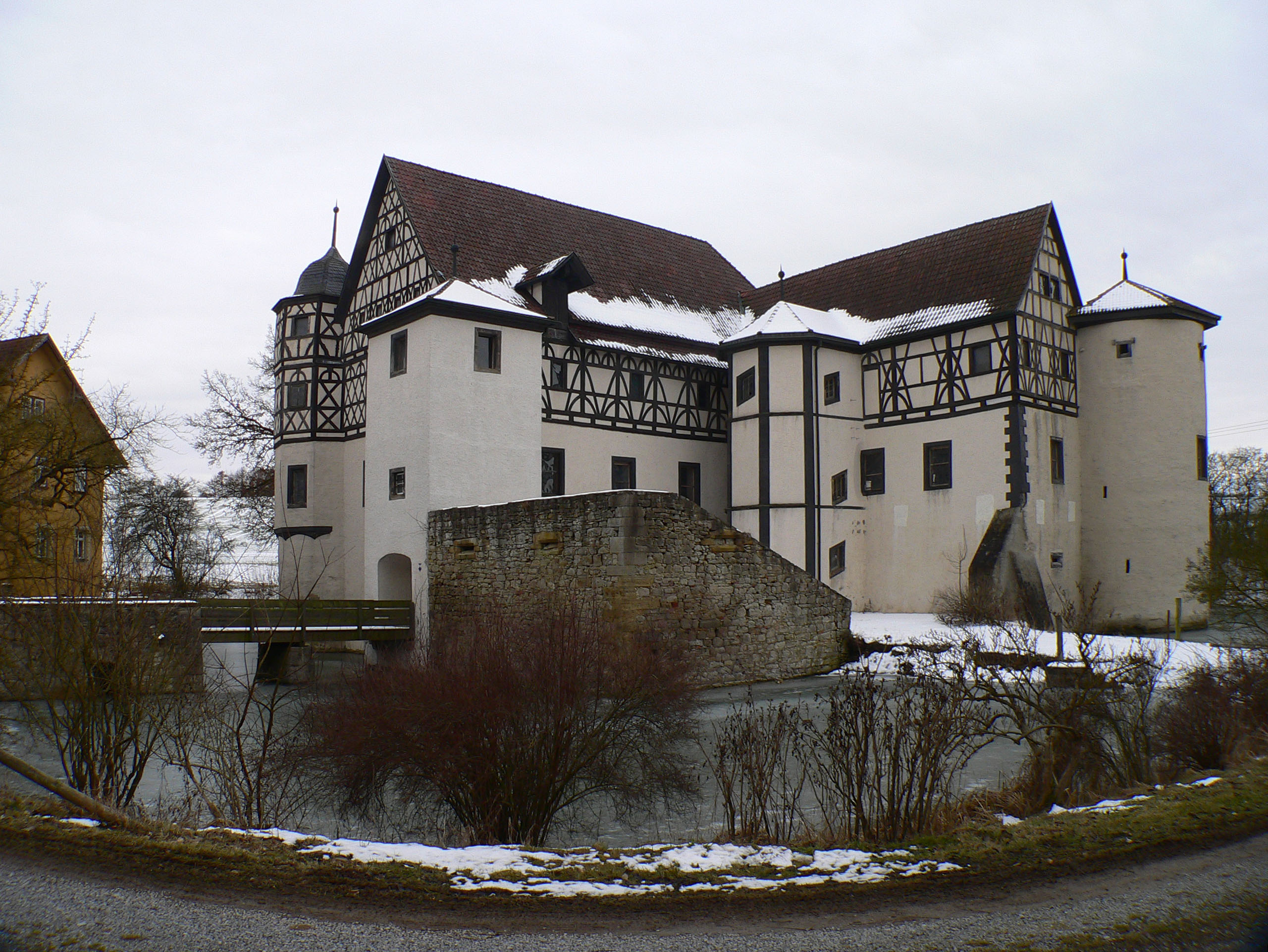
Schloss Roßrieth

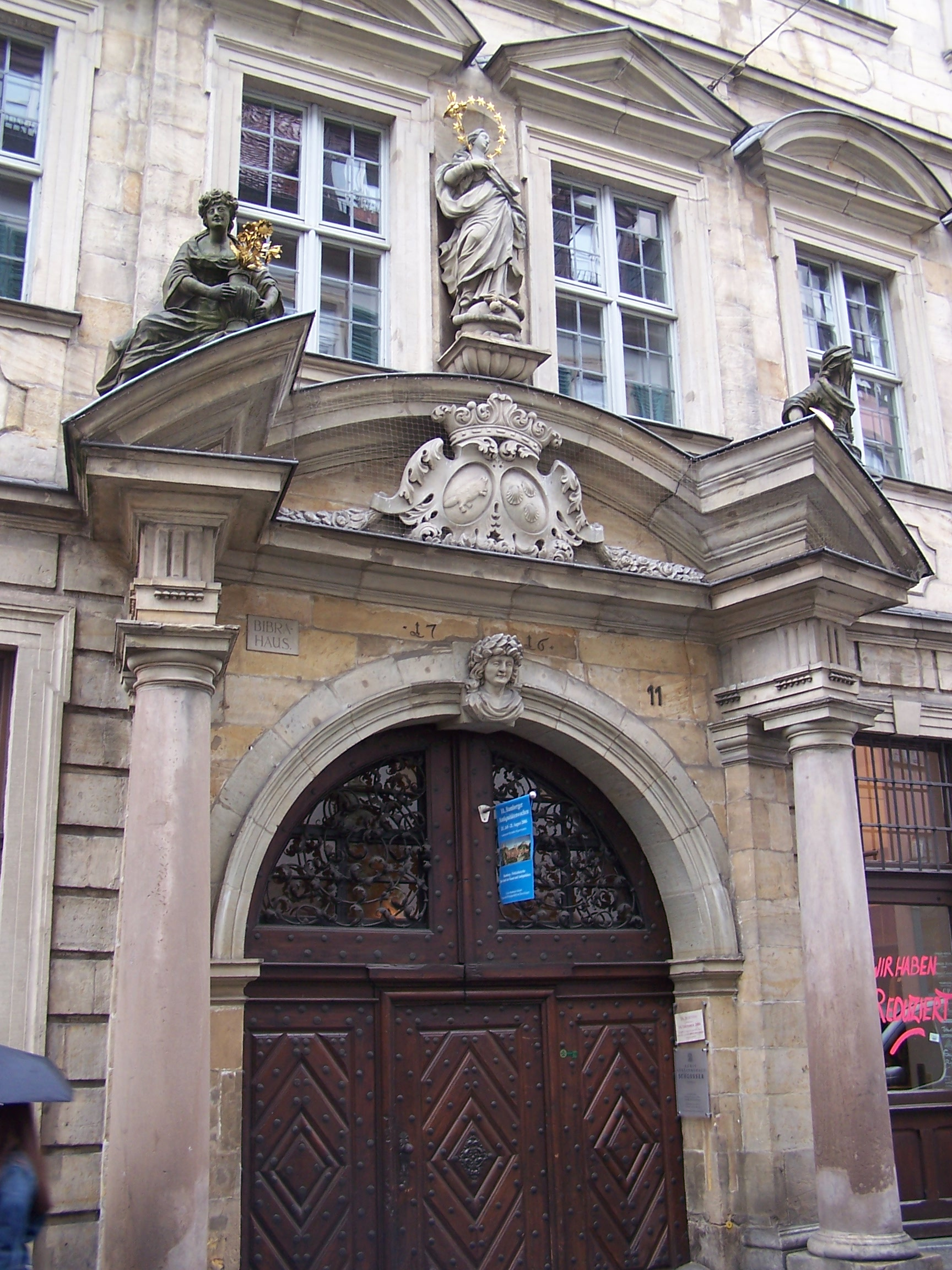
Bibra Palais (Bibra Haus), Bamberg

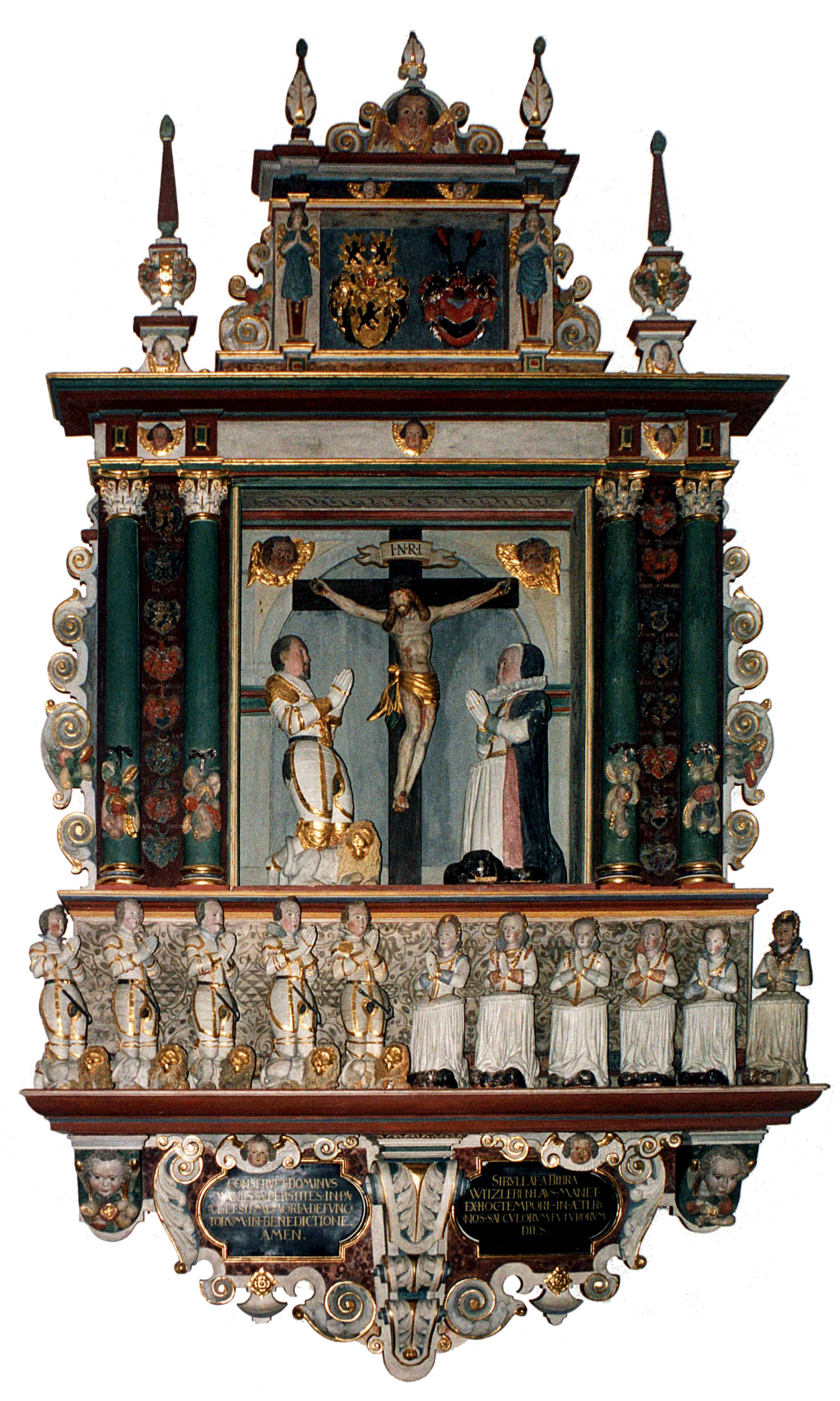
Epitaph of Bernhard and Sibylle von Bibra at Irmelshausen

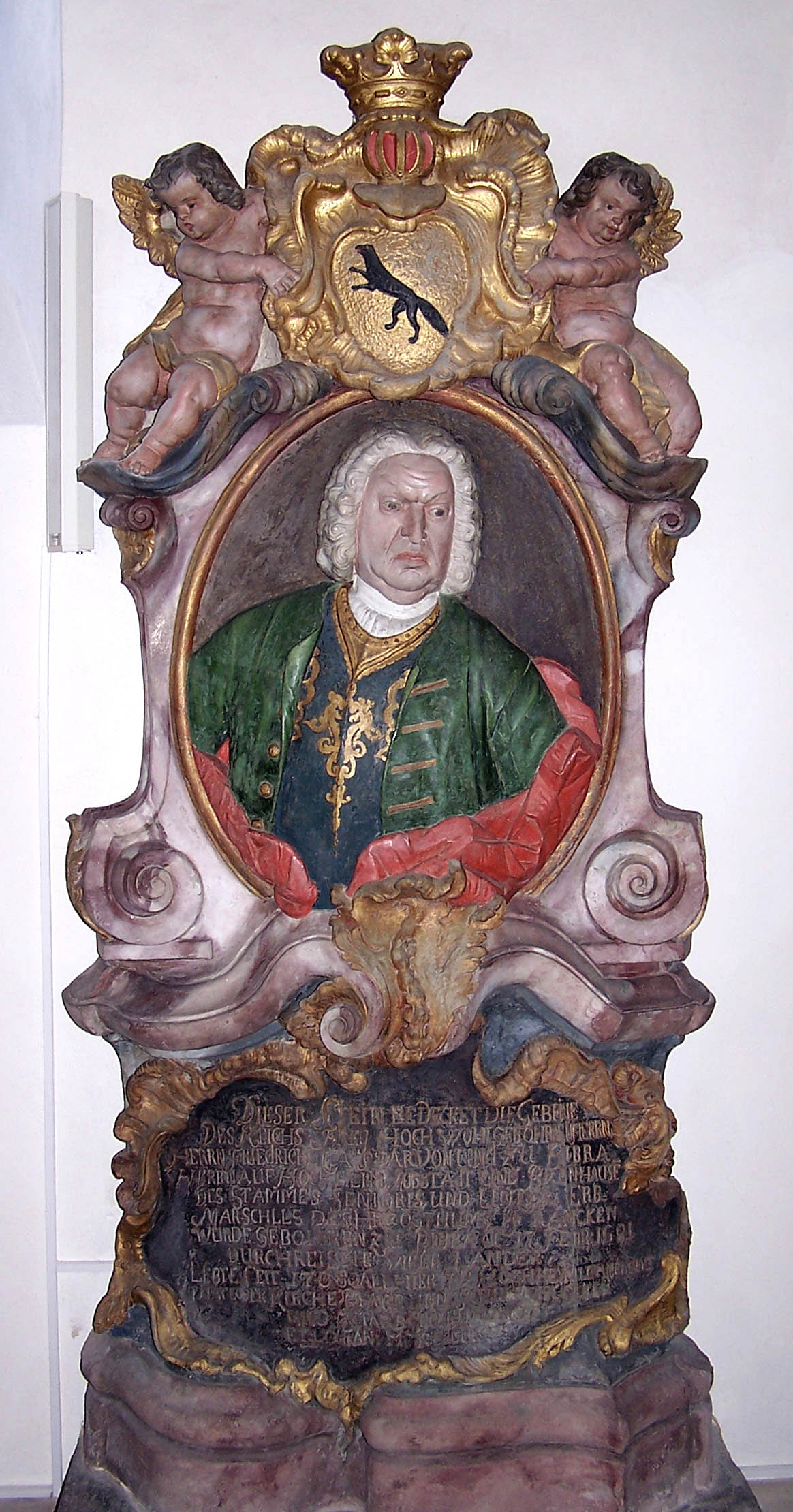
Grave of Friedrich Kaspar von Bibra (1681–1750) in Höchheim

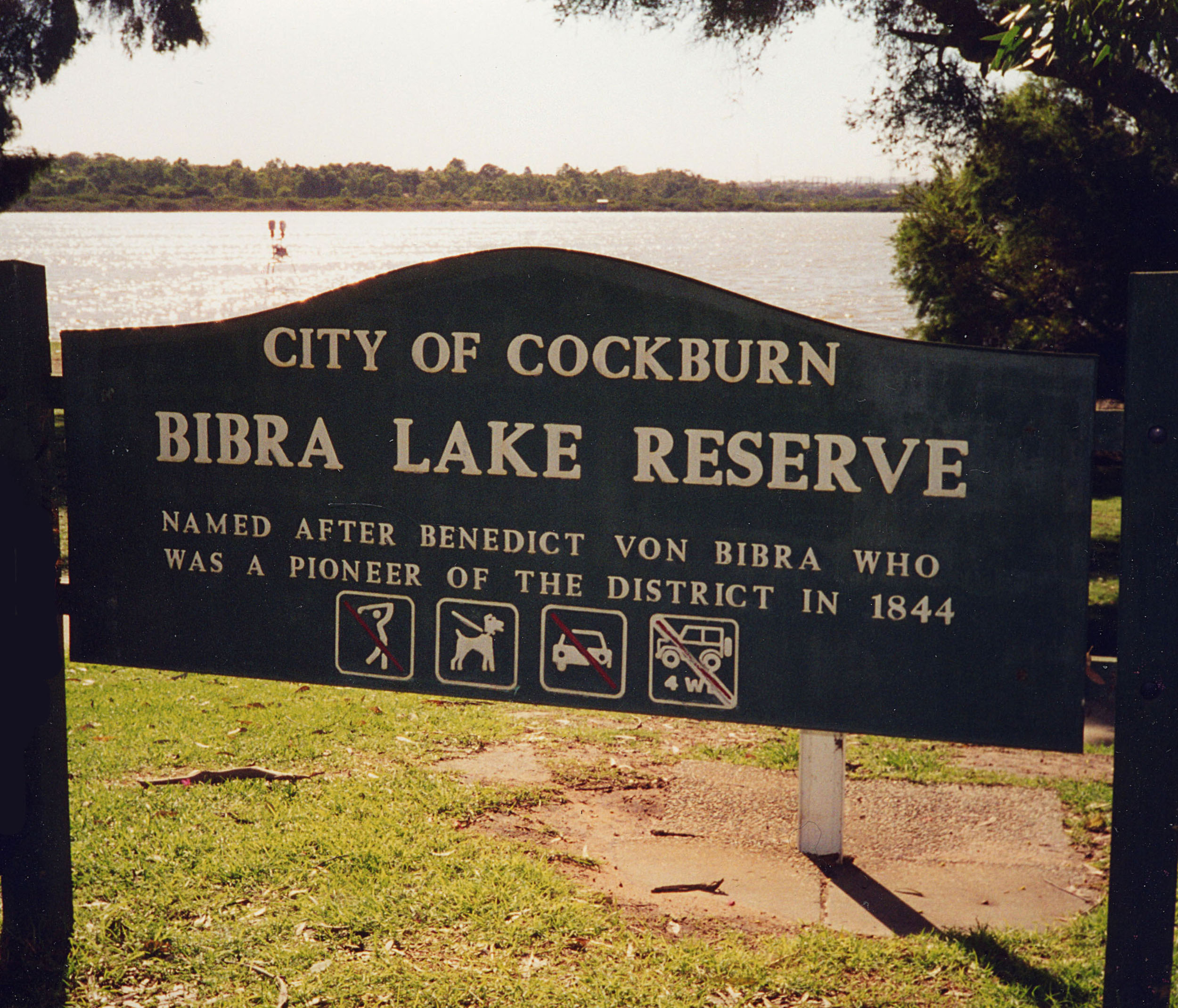
Bibra Lake located in the Perth Australia suburb, Bibra Lake

== Erbuntermarschallamt (hereditary under-marshal office) of Prince-Bishopric of Würzburg 1357 – 1803 ==
1357: The counts of Henneberg had the title to the office in 1357 transferred to the Bibra family, but then withdrawn and returned to it to the von der Kere family.

1405: In two contracts of 1405 and 1486, both families finally agreed on the alternating exercise of the office. When the Henneberg family renounced the Obermarschall of Würzburg in 1533 for political reasons, there were no more changes with the Untermarschallamt until the extinction of the Henneberg house in 1584.

1572: The sole right of succession claimed by the Bibra after the extinction of the von der Kere family in 1572 was contested by Prince Bishop Julius Echter of Mespelbrunn (ruled 1573–1617), and the share of the Kere family transferred to his own family. Until the extinction of the Mespelbrunn (1665), members of both families exercised an alternating office.

1665 -1803 (secularization): The Bibras stand unchallenged. Beginning in 1803, it became an "empty title" with no Prince-Bishopric.

The Erbntermarschallamt was held by the Familiensenior or Senior familiae (Family Senior) which is the eldest male member of the Bibra family when the family held the position. Friedrich Gotthelf (1736-1813, Brennhausen line) claimed office in 1783 (five years early) even though Prince Bishop Heinrich (1711-1788) was older but was unable to fulfill role.

=== Erbuntertruchsess of the Prince-Bishopric of Bamberg ===
Beginning in 1721, members of the Schabelwaid/Weisendorf line had the Erbuntertruchsess of the Prince-Bishopric of Bamberg. This officed ended in 1803 when then bishopric was secularized.

== Bibra family / Bibran-Modlau family relationship ==
Bibran-Modlau family (Bibran, Bibra und Modlau, Bibra-Modlau) was a Silesian noble family which was raised to Reichsfreiherr (Imperial barons) 1624.

The family and the three sons-in-law of the apparent last Silesian Bibran-Modlau used multiple variations of the name including:

"Bibra" instead of "Bibran"
von Bibran und Modlau
Block von Bibran und Modlau
Kölichen gen. Freiherren von Bibra u. Modlau
Schönberg von Bibra und Modlau.

One source (Origines familiae Bibranorum in Francia orientali utraque Silesia et Lusatia ...) reports that the family descends from a Sigmund von Bibra (Franconian Bibra family) who traveled to Silesia in the 11th century, however the different coat of arms casts doubt on the connection. The description with the published (c. 1860) print of Schloss Modlau describes the Bibran family as having split off from the Franconia Bibras five hundred years ago. By 1480 Modlau and Profen were already in possession of the family. At the end of the family, it was centered at Reisicht and Modlau, in present-day Poland. Prominent members of the family were: Friedrich Heinrich von Bibran-Modlau, Abraham von Bibran Kittlitztreben und Woitsdorf, and Sigismund Heinrich von Bibran-Modlau who was one of the largest land owner in Silesia.

David Heinrich von Bibran-Modlau was the apparent last male member of the family in Silesia. When he died in 1828, he had three daughters. His three sons-in-law (von Kölichen, von Block and von Schönberg) incorporated the Bibran-Modlau into their names. The son-in-law Ernst Heinrich von Kölichen, who had incorporated the Bibran-Modlau name and coat of arms died (1832) with a daughter, Agnes, but no sons. Ernst’s son-in-law, Ludwig von Senden again incorporated (c. 1836) the Bibran name into his own becoming "von Senden-Bibran" as in Gustav von Senden-Bibran.
