= Jewish cemetery, Kleinbardorf =

Cultural heritage monument in Bavaria

Judenhügel Kleinbardorf
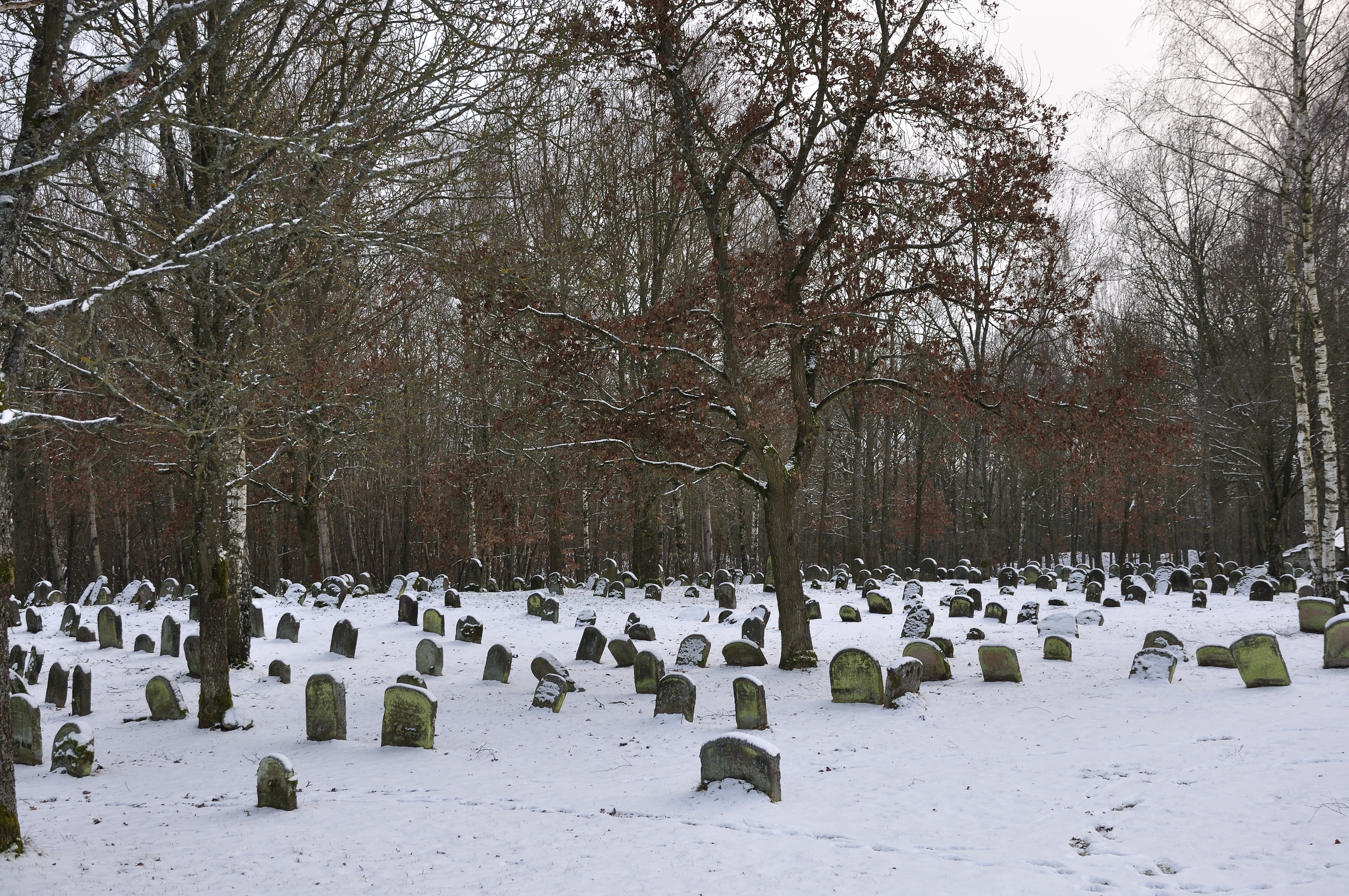
- Jewish cemetery Kleinbardorf
- Interactive map of Judenhügel Kleinbardorf

Details
- Established: 1574
- Location: Kleinbardorf, Bavaria
- Country: Germany
- Coordinates: 50°16′22″N 10°24′42″E
- Type: Jewish (closed)
- Owned by: German government
- Size: 21,050 square metres (5.20 acres)
- No. of graves: 20,000

The Jewish cemetery of Kleinbardorf began operations in 1574 on the so-called Steilen or Wartberg southeast of Kleinbardorf, in northern Bavaria. The area is now known only as Judenhügel (Jewish hills).

The cemetery is located within an early Middle Ages ring wall approximately 1.5 Kilometers long.

The grounds has a total area of 21,050 square meters. In 1987 there were approximately 4400 gravestones and in 1933 there were approximately 20,000 gravestones. The cemetery is the second largest Jewish cemetery in Bavaria, the largest being Munich.

== History ==
The family history of the Bibra family records 1574 as the beginning of the cemetery under George Christof von Bibra and the fees are spelled out.

In 1696/97 Jospe Neustatt paid for the construction of a Tahara House (mortuary) with a stone roof and a stone ritual purification table. In 1964 it was renovated by the citizens of Kleinbardorf.

In 1769, the Jewish community purchased the cemetery and expanded it and by a further land acquisition in 1843 it reached its present size.

The cemetery was desecrated in 1925, between 1933 and 1945, in 1957 and again in 1977. The cemetery was renovated. In 1988 the German Government awarded Mr. Hermann the 'Order of Merit' decoration for his maintenance of the cemetery. Besides serving Kleinbardorf, it also served 27 neighbouring Jewish communities as a burial ground, including those from Bastheim, Eichenhausen, Höchheim, Kleineibstadt, Königshofen, Poppenlauer, Rödelmaier, Trappstadt, Unsleben, Massbach and Oberlauringen. The burial register from 1759 to 1938 is still in existence today, as are chronicles of burials between 1800 and 1938.

== Local Jewish population locations and trends ==
Jewish Population in the Old County of Königshofenaccording to Naturpark Haßberge sign crediting Reinhold Albert
	1810	1813	1830	1839	1848	1871	1880	1890	1900	1910	1925	1933	1935	1937	1939	1940
Aub								1								
Aubstadt											4					
Obereßfeld											1					
Rothausen								4								
Saal an der Saale								1		1						
Höchheim	100	120	99	111	124	99	82	78	55	47	25	26	26			
Kleinbardorf	85	76	77	83	87	75	60	58	54	35	11	11	8			
Kleineibstadt	75	104	97	101	93	100	114	105	72	50	26	7	12			
Königshofen	22	24	21	25	38	64	68	81	89	101	108	94	81			
Sulzdorf a.d.L.	147	151	134	121	103	67	53	38	32	12						
Trappstadt	22	53	70	69	60	56	56	60	38	26	15	10	9			
Waltershausen	38	34	39	54	46	14	8	3								
Overall	467	562	537	564	551	475	441	429	340	272	190	148	136	112	76	44

=== Women’s graves ===
Right of the southwest entrance is a section for women who died in childbirth.

=== Memorial ===
In the cemetery there is a Memorial for Jewish fallen of the World War I.

== Gallery ==
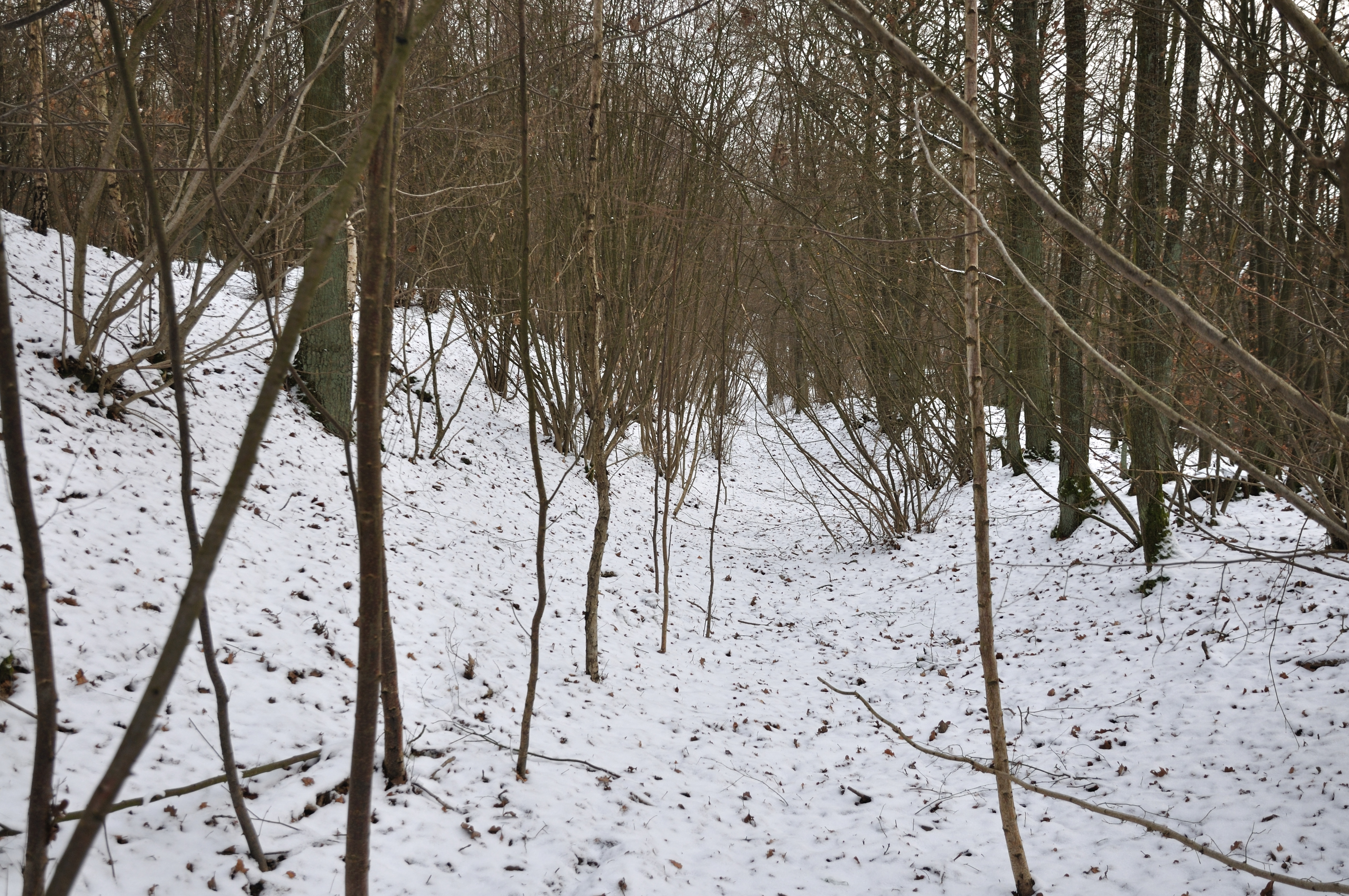
Ringwall on the perimeter of the cemetery

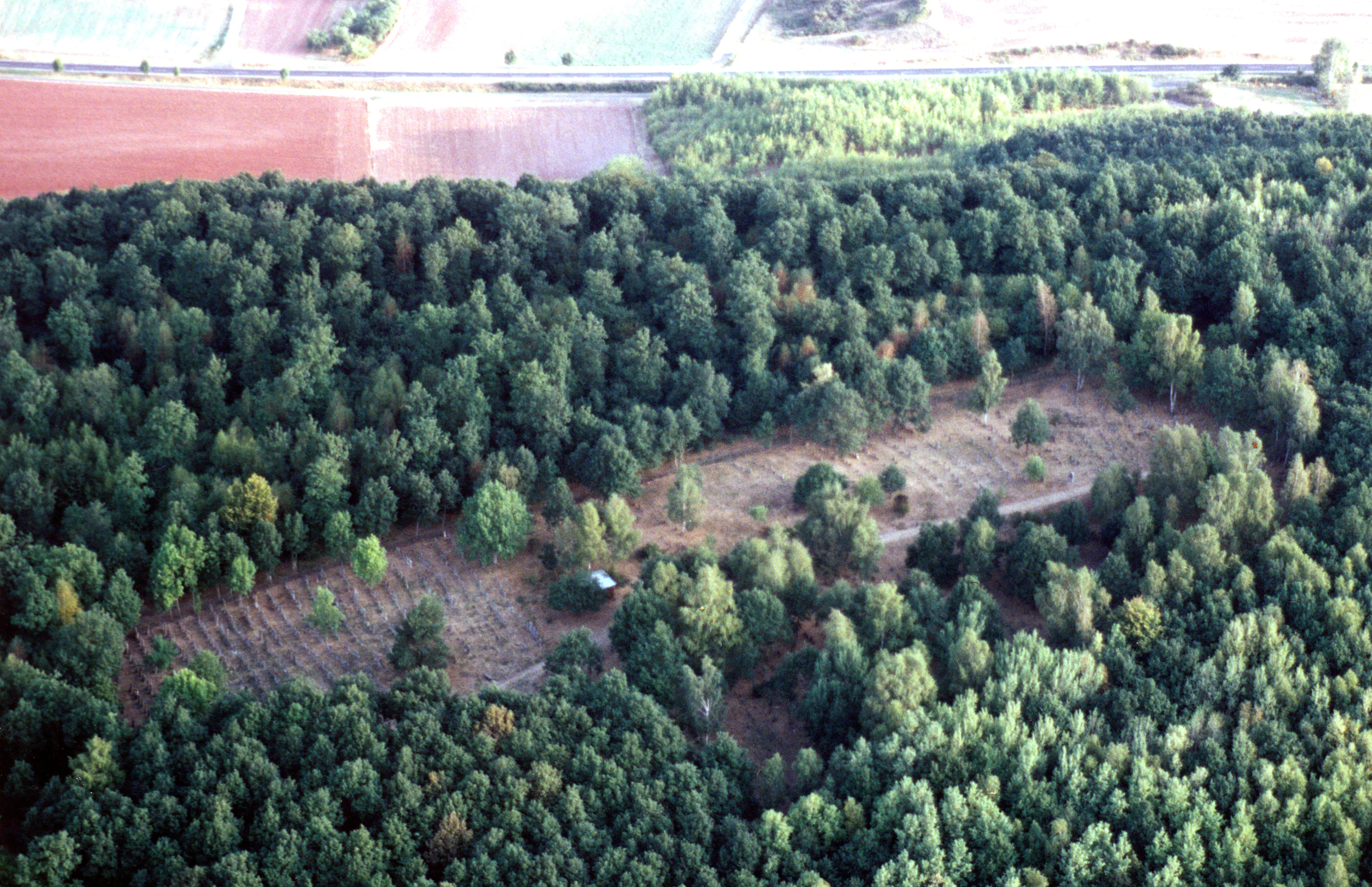
view from a hot air balloon

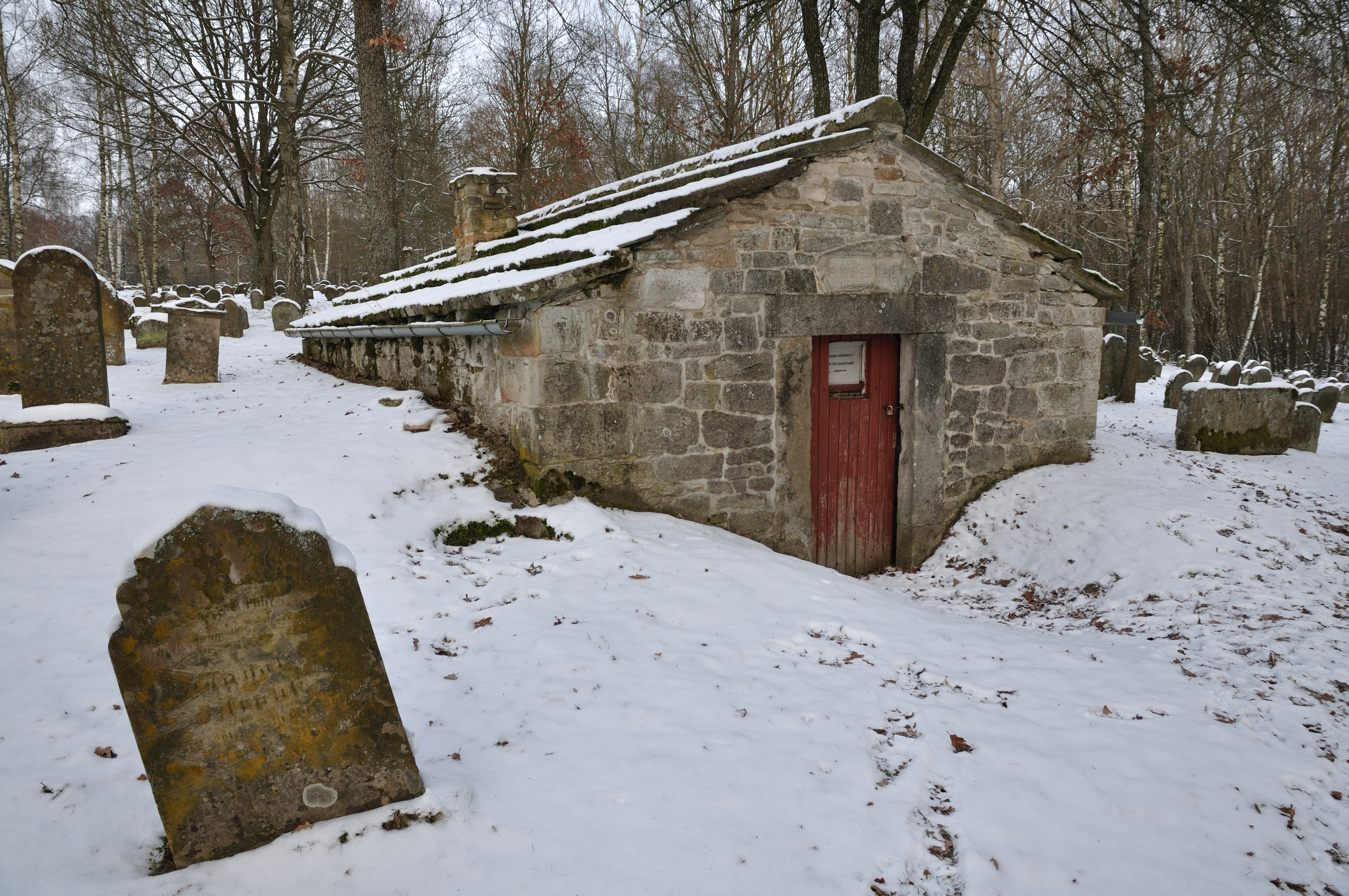
Mortuary or Tahara House

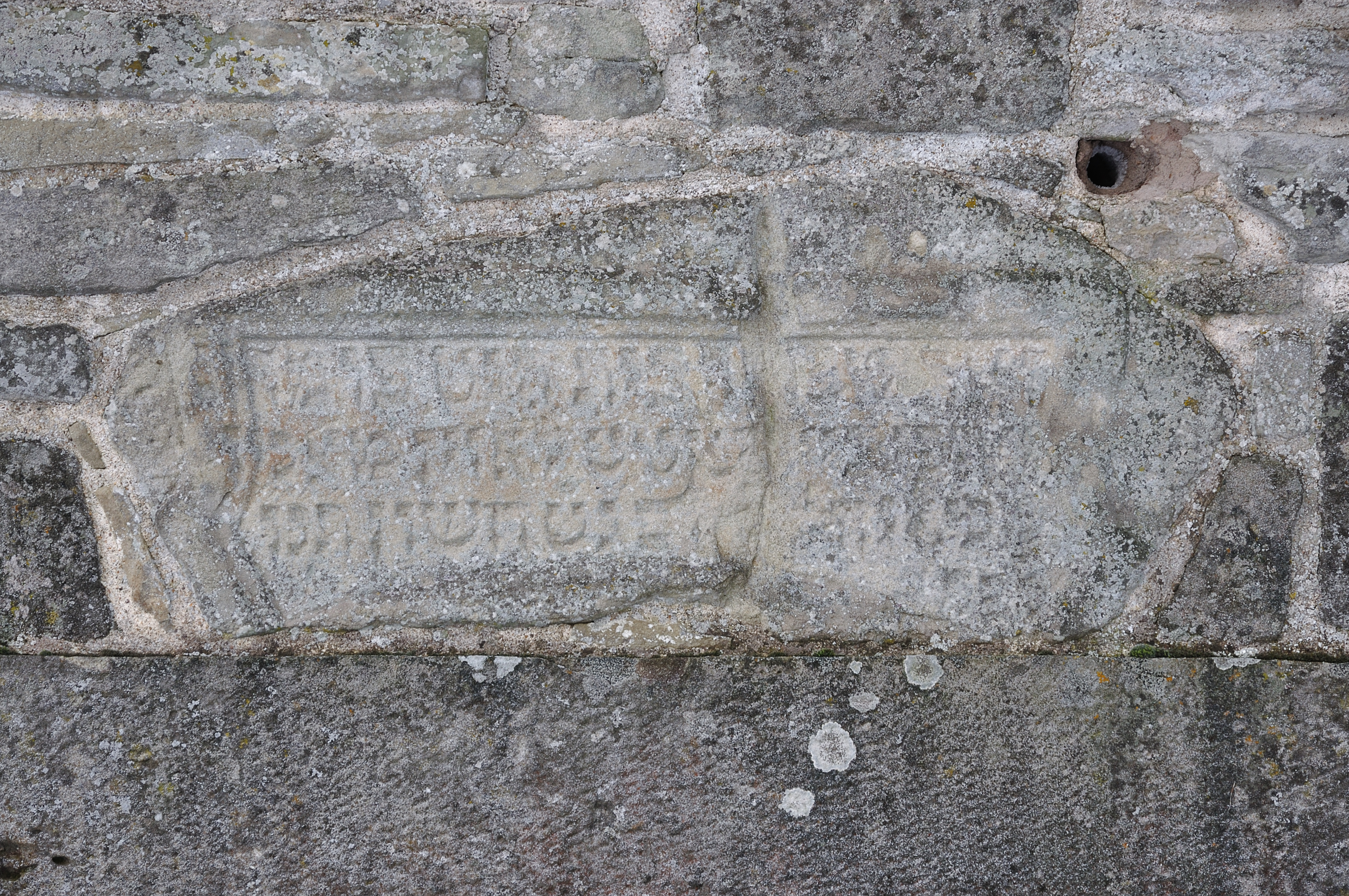
Inscription acknowledging the donation of the Tara House

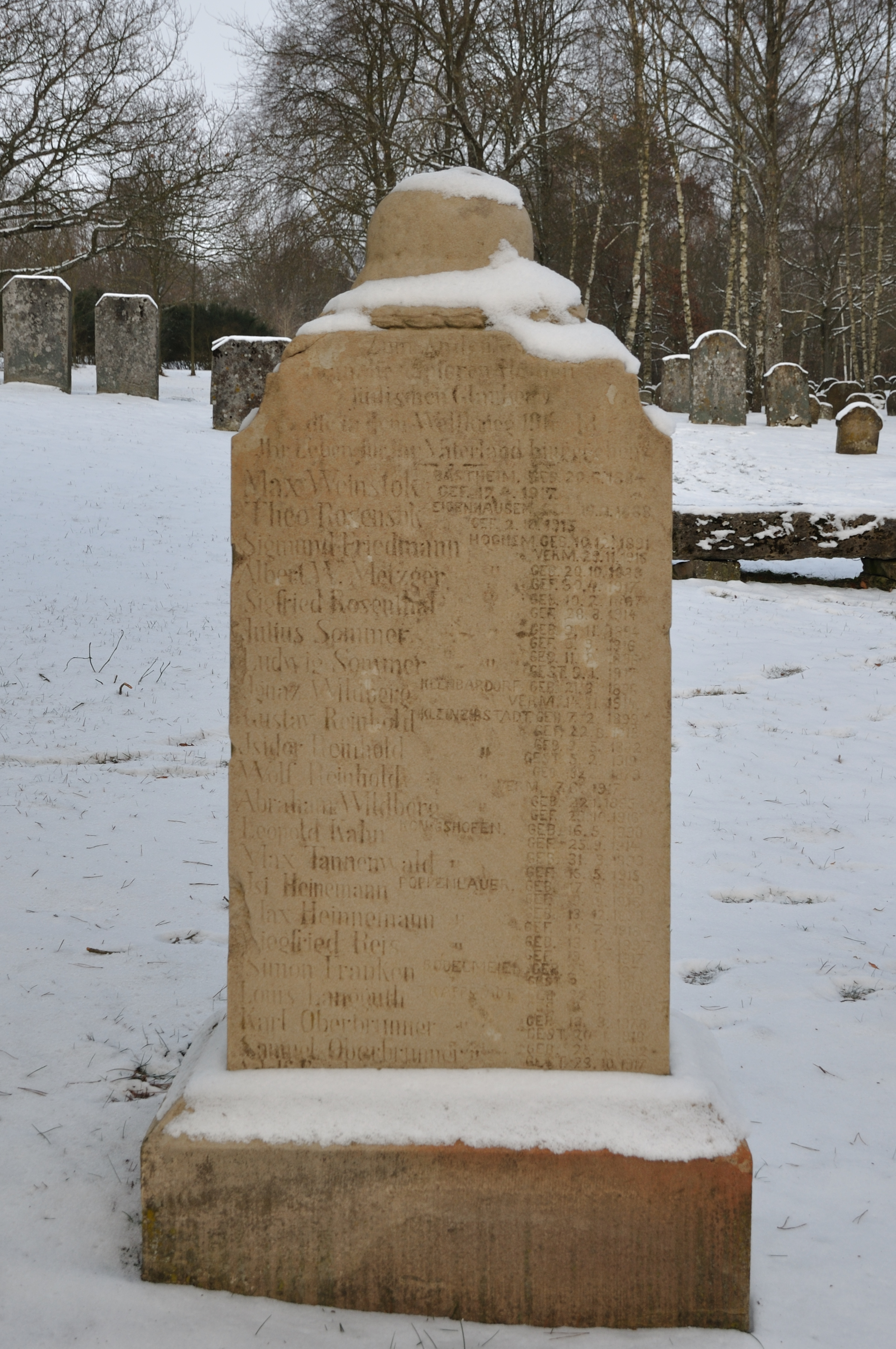
Memorial for Jewish dead

== Literature ==
- WILHELM FRHR. VON BIBRA, Beiträge zur Familien Geschichte der Reichsfreiherrn von Bibra, Zweiter Band (vol. 2), 1882; page 394 Footnote 2 Digitized copy Universitäts- und Landesbibliothek Düsseldorf
