= Saal an der Saale (Verwaltungsgemeinschaft) =

- Verwaltungsgemeinschaft
- Location of Saal an der Saale within Rhön-Grabfeld district
- Interactive map of Saal an der Saale
- Location within Germany Location within Bavaria
- Coordinates: 50°19′N 10°21′E
- Country: Germany
- State: Bavaria
- Admin. region: Lower Franconia
- District: Rhön-Grabfeld
- Seat: Saal an der Saale
- Subdivisions: 3 municipalities

Area
  - Total: 56.34 km^{2} (21.75 sq mi)

Population (2025-12-31)
  - Total: 4,098
  - Density: 72.74/km^{2} (188.4/sq mi)
- Time zone: UTC+01:00 (CET)
  - Summer (DST): UTC+02:00 (CEST)
- Website: www.vg-saal.de

Saal an der Saale is a Verwaltungsgemeinschaft (municipal association) in the district Rhön-Grabfeld in Bavaria, Germany. Its seat is in Saal an der Saale.

It consists of the following municipalities:

1. Großeibstadt
2. Saal an der Saale
3. Wülfershausen
