= Sulzfeld, Rhön-Grabfeld =

Sulzfeld
- Municipality
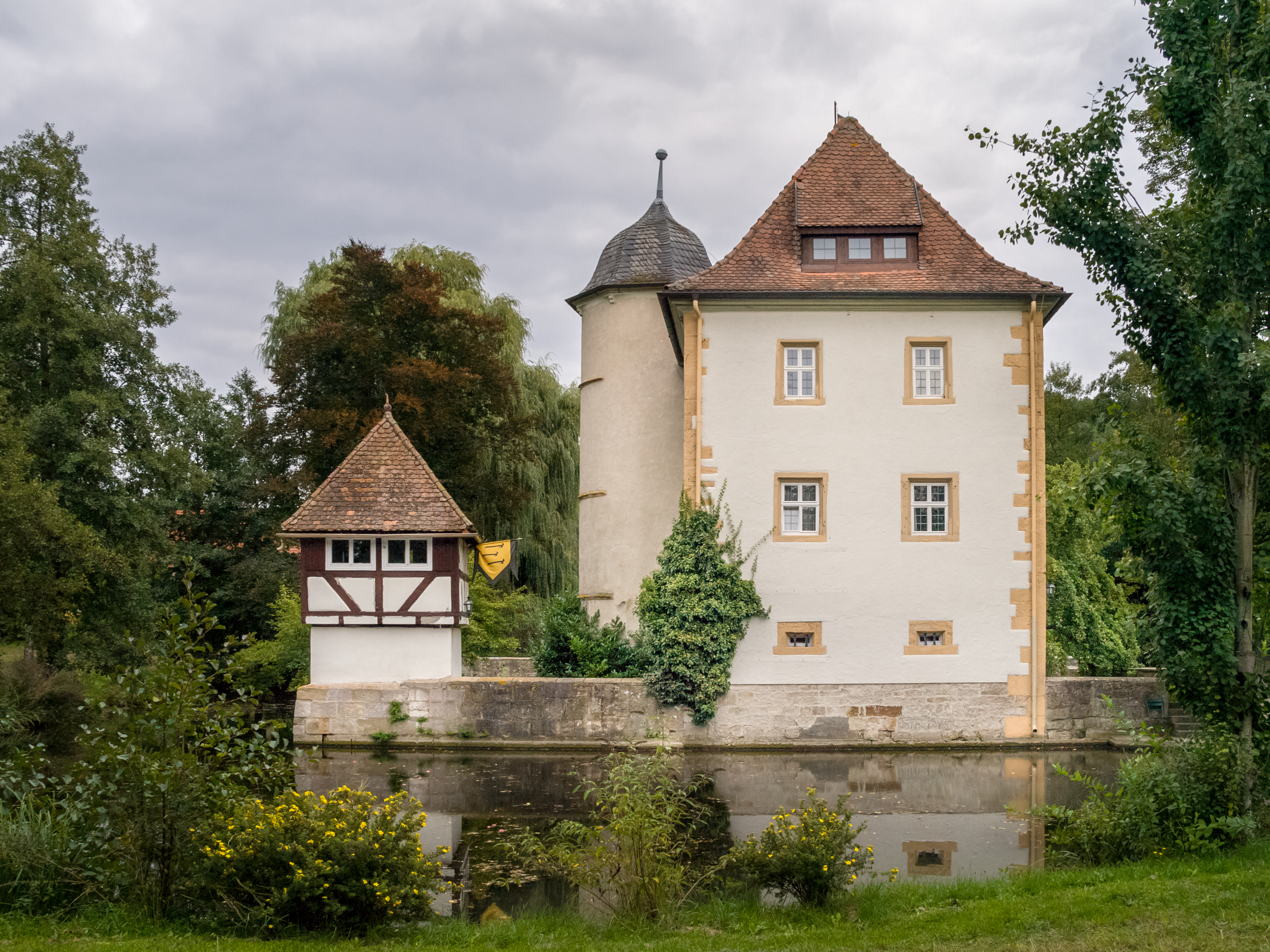
- Kleinbardorf Castle

- Coat of arms

- Location of Sulzfeld within Rhön-Grabfeld district
- Interactive map of Sulzfeld
- Location within Germany Location within Bavaria
- Coordinates: 50°16′N 10°24′E
- Country: Germany
- State: Bavaria
- Admin. region: Unterfranken
- District: Rhön-Grabfeld
- Municipal assoc.: Bad Königshofen im Grabfeld

Government
  - Mayor (2020–26): Jürgen Heusinger

Area
  - Total: 22.52 km^{2} (8.70 sq mi)
- Elevation: 302 m (991 ft)

Population (2025-12-31)
  - Total: 1,772
  - Density: 78.69/km^{2} (203.8/sq mi)
- Time zone: UTC+01:00 (CET)
  - Summer (DST): UTC+02:00 (CEST)
- Postal codes: 97633
- Dialling codes: 09761, 09724 (Leinach)
- Vehicle registration: NES
- Website: www.sulzfeldgrabfeld.de

Sulzfeld is a municipality in the district of Rhön-Grabfeld in Bavaria in Germany. It contains the following villages: Kleinbardorf, Leinach, Sulzfeld, Sulzfelder Forst. The large regional Jewish cemetery, Jewish Cemetery (Kleinbardorf) is also located in the municipality.

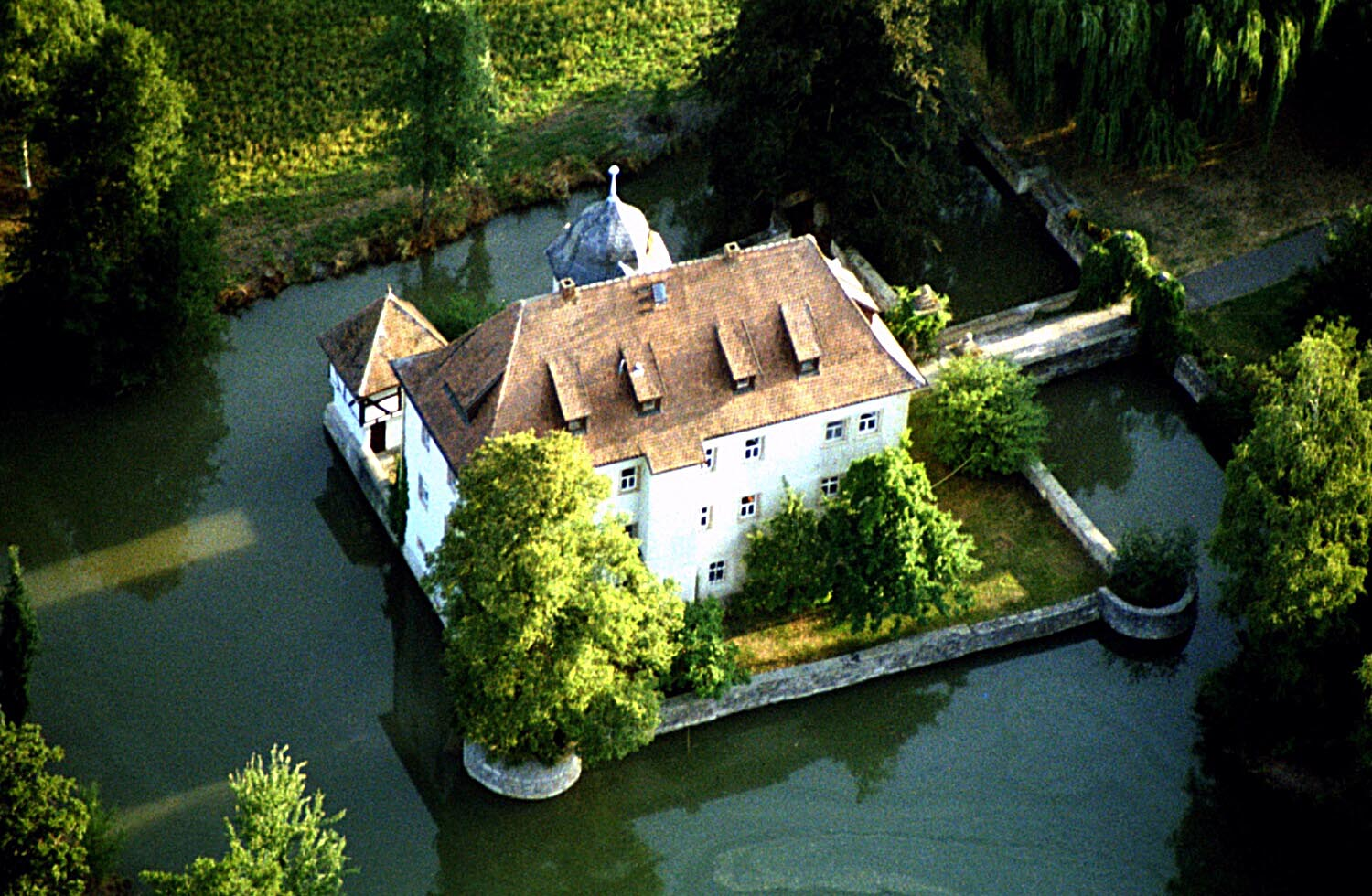
The small water castle Kleinbardorf from a balloon

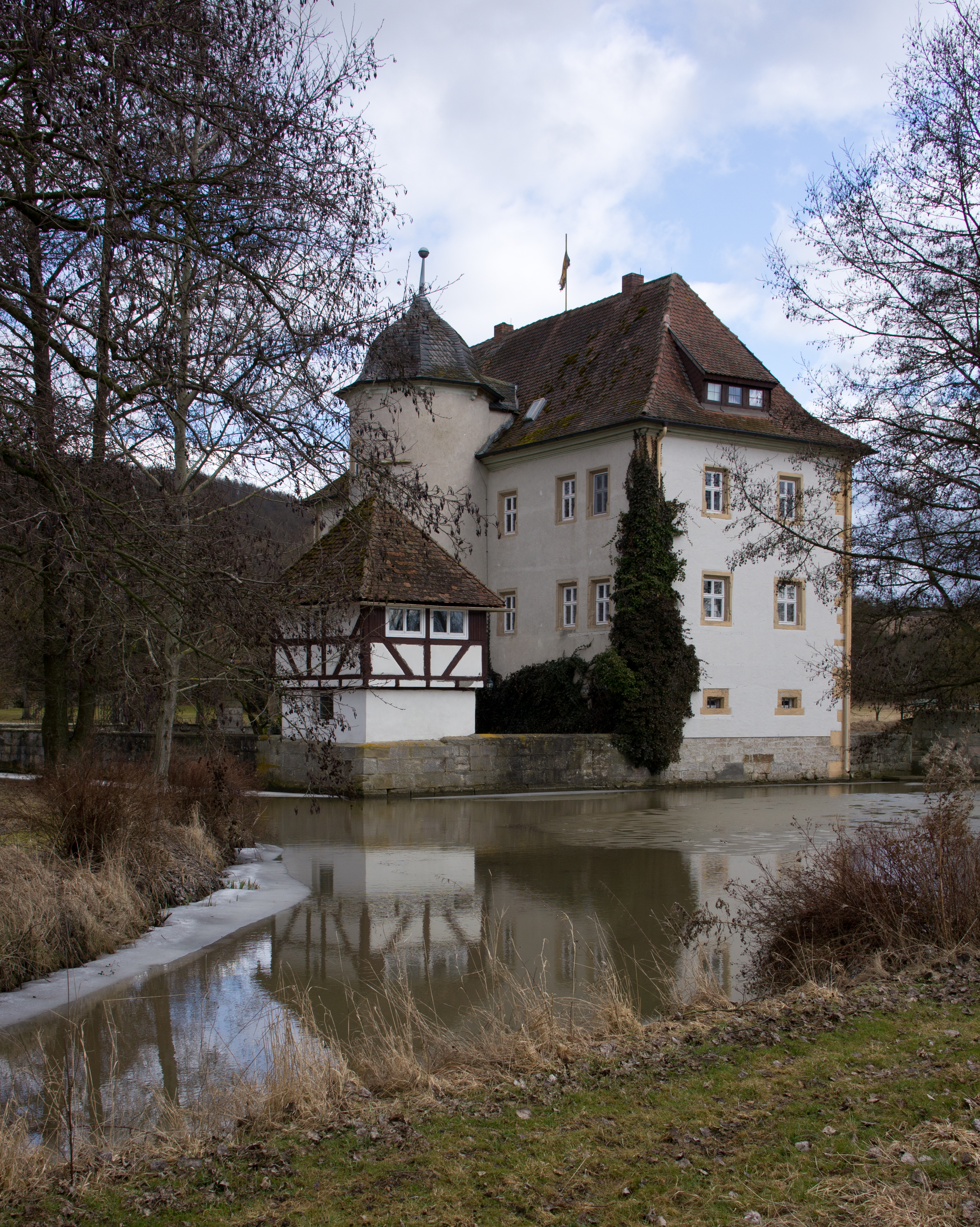
The small water castle Kleinbardorf
