= Wülfershausen =

Wülfershausen an der Saale
- Municipality
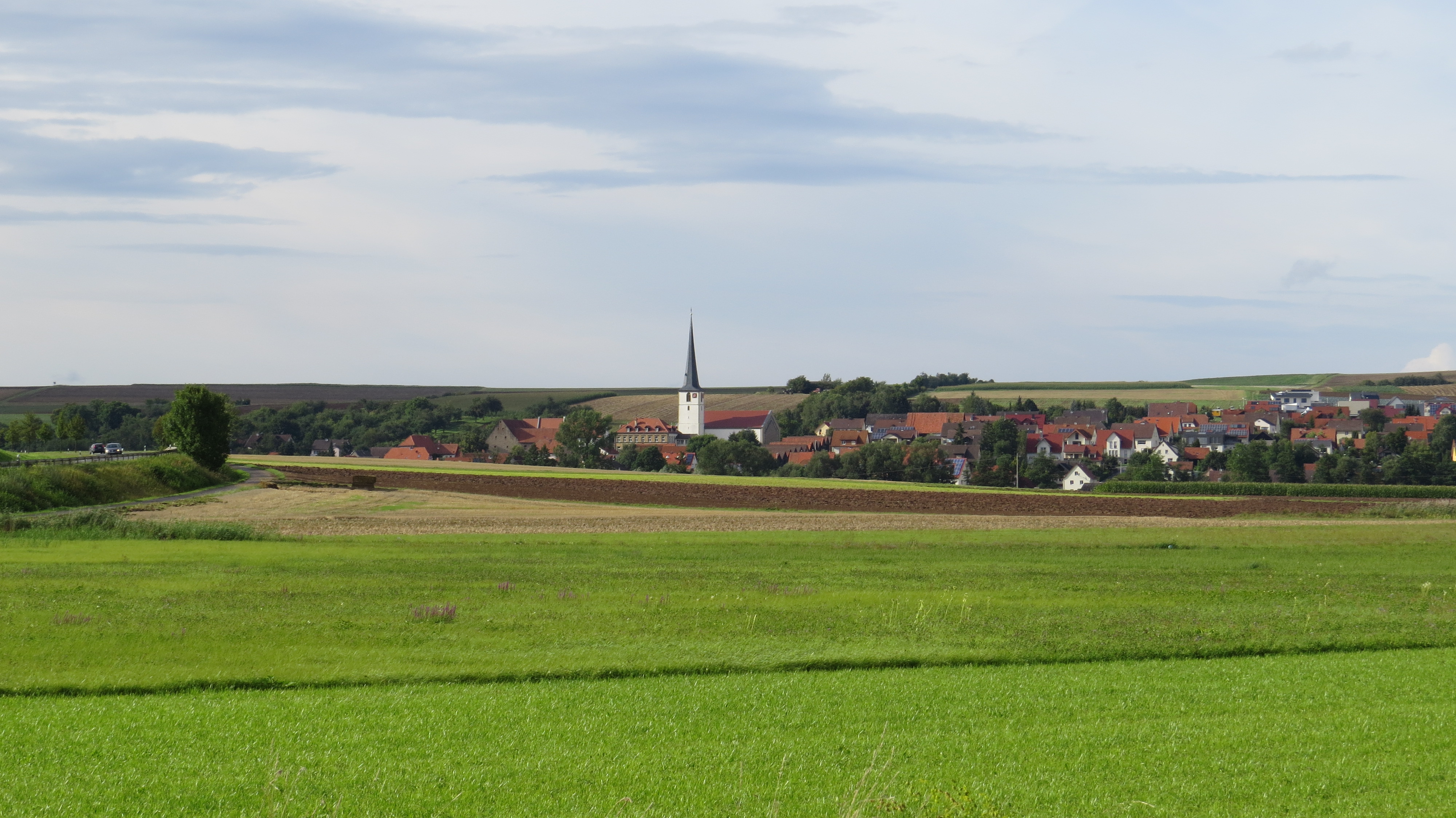
- Wülfershausen seen from the south

- Coat of arms

- Location of Wülfershausen an der Saale within Rhön-Grabfeld district
- Interactive map of Wülfershausen an der Saale
- Location within Germany Location within Bavaria
- Coordinates: 50°20′N 10°21′E
- Country: Germany
- State: Bavaria
- Admin. region: Unterfranken
- District: Rhön-Grabfeld
- Municipal assoc.: Saal an der Saale

Government
  - Mayor (2020–26): Wolfgang Seifert

Area
  - Total: 18.12 km^{2} (7.00 sq mi)
- Elevation: 266 m (873 ft)

Population (2025-12-31)
  - Total: 1,547
  - Density: 85.38/km^{2} (221.1/sq mi)
- Time zone: UTC+01:00 (CET)
  - Summer (DST): UTC+02:00 (CEST)
- Postal codes: 97618
- Dialling codes: 09762
- Vehicle registration: NES
- Website: www.wuelfershausen.de

Wülfershausen an der Saale (German pronunciation: [vʏlfɐsˈhaʊzn̩ ʔan deːɐ̯ ˈzaːlə], lit. 'Wülfershausen on the Saale') is a municipality in the district of Rhön-Grabfeld in Bavaria in Germany, located on the Franconian Saale. The municipality consists of these two villages: Wülfershausen and Eichenhausen. The township is a member of the administrative community called "Verwaltungsgemeinschaft" Saal an der Saale.
