= Großeibstadt =

- Municipality
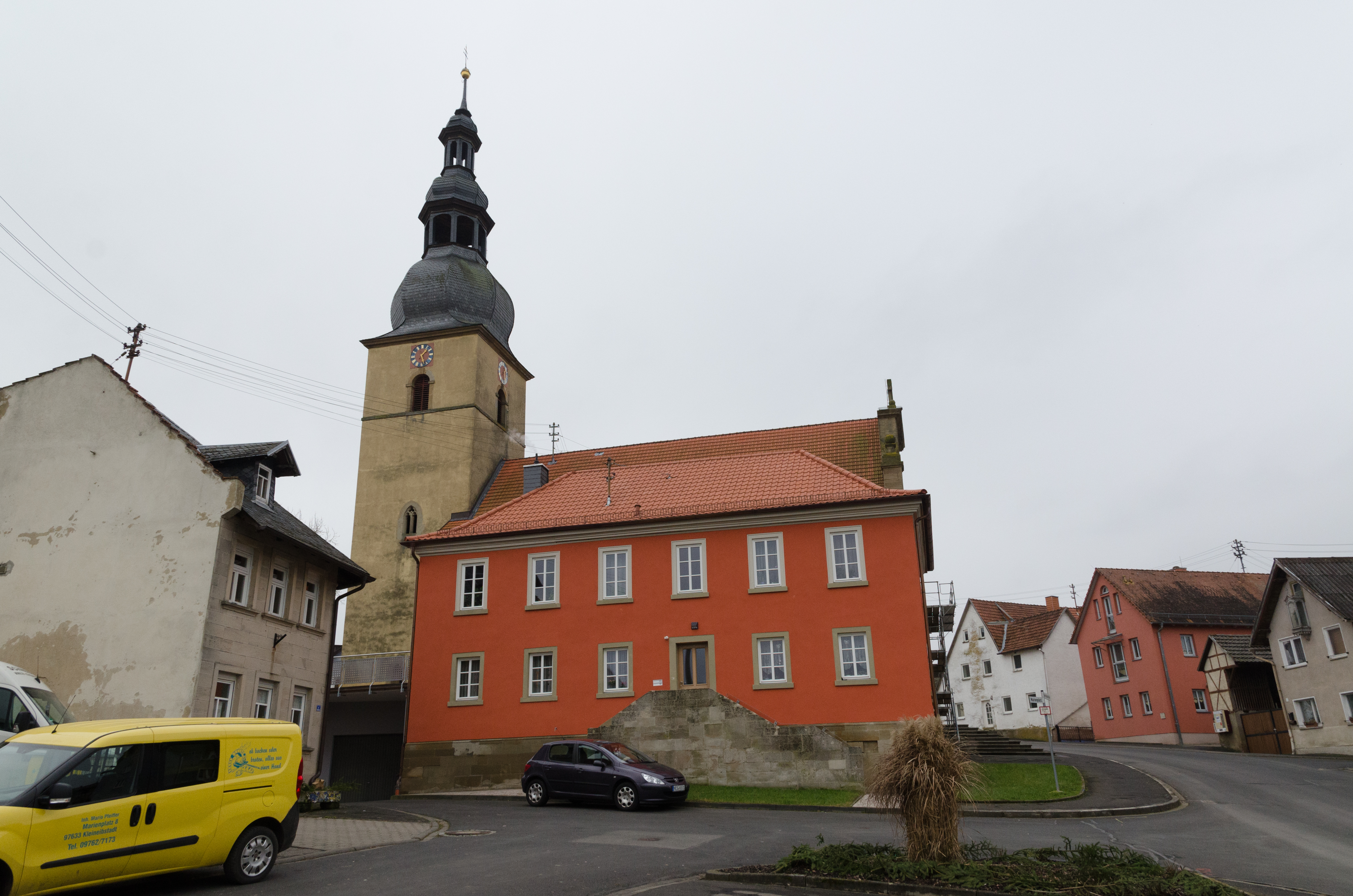
- Church of Saint Bartholomew in Kleineibstadt

- Coat of arms

- Location of Großeibstadt within Rhön-Grabfeld district
- Interactive map of Großeibstadt
- Location within Germany Location within Bavaria
- Coordinates: 50°18′N 10°25′E
- Country: Germany
- State: Bavaria
- Admin. region: Unterfranken
- District: Rhön-Grabfeld
- Municipal assoc.: Saal an der Saale

Government
  - Mayor (2020–26): Gerhard Jäger

Area
  - Total: 16.64 km^{2} (6.42 sq mi)
- Elevation: 286 m (938 ft)

Population (2025-12-31)
  - Total: 1,034
  - Density: 62.14/km^{2} (160.9/sq mi)
- Time zone: UTC+01:00 (CET)
  - Summer (DST): UTC+02:00 (CEST)
- Postal codes: 97633
- Dialling codes: 09761
- Vehicle registration: NES
- Website: www.rhoen-saale.net

Großeibstadt is a municipality in the district of Rhön-Grabfeld in Bavaria in Germany. The river Franconian Saale flows through Kleineibstadt.

The municipality consists of the following villages: Großeibstadt and Kleineibstadt. The township is a member of the administrative community called "Verwaltungsgemeinschaft" Saal an der Saale.
