= Saal an der Saale =

Saal a.d.Saale
- Municipality
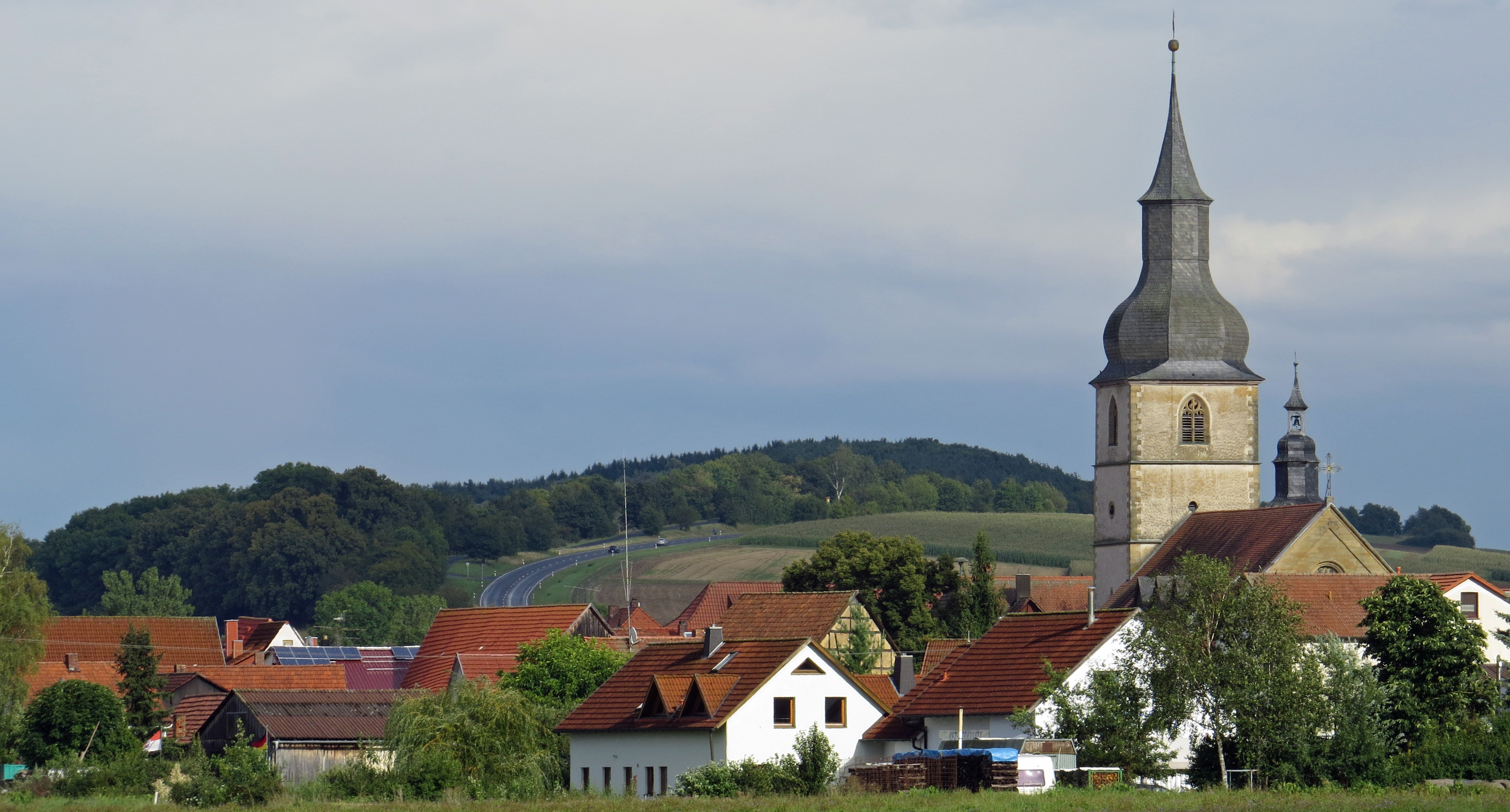
- Saal an der Saale as seen from the west

- Coat of arms

- Location of Saal a.d.Saale within Rhön-Grabfeld district
- Interactive map of Saal a.d.Saale
- Location within Germany Location within Bavaria
- Coordinates: 50°19′N 10°22′E
- Country: Germany
- State: Bavaria
- Admin. region: Unterfranken
- District: Rhön-Grabfeld
- Municipal assoc.: Saal an der Saale

Government
  - Mayor (2020–26): Cornelia Dahinten

Area
  - Total: 21.57 km^{2} (8.33 sq mi)
- Elevation: 254 m (833 ft)

Population (2025-12-31)
  - Total: 1,517
  - Density: 70.33/km^{2} (182.2/sq mi)
- Time zone: UTC+01:00 (CET)
  - Summer (DST): UTC+02:00 (CEST)
- Postal codes: 97633
- Dialling codes: 097nznzmzmz62
- Vehicle registration: NES
- Website: www.saal-saale.de

Saal an der Saale (German pronunciation: [ˈzaːl ʔan deːɐ̯ ˈzaːlə], lit. 'Saal on the Saale') is a municipality in the district of Rhön-Grabfeld in Bavaria in Germany. It is situated on the river Franconian Saale. The municipality consists the two townships Saal an der Saale and Waltershausen.

Ever since the 1978 "Gemeindegebietsreform" it has been the seat of the joint administration of these independent communities: Wülfershausen, Großeibstadt, and Saal an der Saale. The entire administrative area is home to roughly 4200 inhabitants as of 2008.

== History ==
=== Until the founding of the community ===
The Prince-Bishopric of Würzburg exercised territorial sovereignty over Saal from 1368 to 1803. From 1500 onwards, it was part of the Franconian Circle of the Holy Roman Empire. The town belonged to the Grand Duchy of Würzburg under Archduke Ferdinand of Tuscany before becoming part of Bavaria with the Treaties of Paris in 1814. The present-day municipality was established with the Municipal Edict of 1818 as part of administrative reforms.
