= Münnerstadt =

- Town
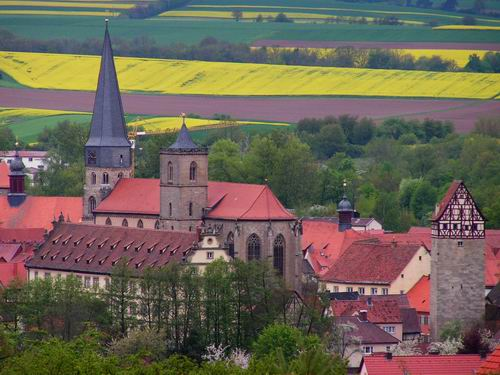
- Center of Münnerstadt

- Coat of arms

- Location of Münnerstadt within Bad Kissingen district
- Interactive map of Münnerstadt
- Location within Germany Location within Bavaria
- Coordinates: 50°15′N 10°10′E
- Country: Germany
- State: Bavaria
- Admin. region: Unterfranken
- District: Bad Kissingen

Government
  - Mayor (2020–26): Michael Kastl

Area
  - Total: 93.11 km^{2} (35.95 sq mi)
- Elevation: 236 m (774 ft)

Population (2025-12-31)
  - Total: 7,538
  - Density: 80.96/km^{2} (209.7/sq mi)
- Time zone: UTC+01:00 (CET)
  - Summer (DST): UTC+02:00 (CEST)
- Postal codes: 97702
- Dialling codes: 09733
- Vehicle registration: KG
- Website: www.muennerstadt.de

Münnerstadt (German pronunciation: [ˈmʏnɐʃtat]) is a town in the district of Bad Kissingen in Bavaria, Germany. It has a population of around 7,600.

== Geography ==
It borders on the towns of Burglauer, Bad Bocklet, Nüdlingen, Maßbach, Großbardorf, and Strahlungen. The municipal territory covers an area of 95 km^{2}.

The town is located in the southern portion of the Mittelgebirge Rhön. The Lauer river (a tributary of the Franconian Saale) flows directly through the town.

== History ==
The area around Münnerstadt has been inhabited at least since approximately 2100 BC. Early Celtic settlers farmed in the area of Grosswenkheim, Maria Bildhausen and Althausen (all villages within the municipal boundaries). Around the 1st century AD, Thuringian and soon after, Franconian settlers moved into the area and used the surrounding hills (Michelsberg) and forests for protection in times of danger. By the 5th century AD a village existed in the area where the base of Michelsberg meets the Lauer river.

=== Middle Ages ===
On 28 December 770, Egi and Sigihilt donated their complete estate including vineyards to the "Munirihestat" monastery of Fulda. This was the first certified mention of Münnerstadt. Between 770 and 876 there were 18 certificates that proved Münnerstadt was of great importance during the Carolingian period.

In 1156 Hermann von Stahleck sponsored the construction of the abbey in Maria Bildhausen. In the 12th century Count Henneberg began to establish his presence in Münnerstadt. Henneberg was also the name of the state of the Holy Roman Empire in which Münnerstadt was located. At this time Henneberg built a small castle on the Lauer river and the inhabitants of the old Münnerstadt left their unprotected dwellings and moved within the shadows of the new castle.

Early in the 13th century Münnerstadt began the fortification of the town with the construction of a wall (1251) and four gates around the entire town to protect them from invading forces. With the addition of the Market (1271), the town court, town council (1279) and town seal (1287), Münnerstadt began a period of prosperity. The grain measurement was the standard in 38 towns in Lower Franconia. In 1231 the Teutonic Knights took over the Ministry of Münnerstadt. In 1279 the Augustinian abbey in Münnerstadt was established.

As a result of the growth and prosperity brought upon Münnerstadt by Count von Henneberg, Emperor Louis IV gave the community its town rights. Münnerstadt became an important base against the Prince-Bishop of Würzburg, but inheritance and financial problems in the mid-14th century led to Würzburg taking over some assets in Münnerstadt. In the late 14th century the town inhabitants rose up to drive out both of the ruling princes but were crushed. In 1385 new laws were established that governed the way of life within the walls of the town.

In 1490, the town council sponsored the construction of an altar in the Pfarrkirche (parish church) by noted artist Tilman Riemenschneider. This was his first contract for a large altar.

In the early 16th century Martin Luther's predication created an uproar by the farmers and citizens who burned down the abbey of Maria Bildhausen, but the riot was quelled by the hard reprisal by the Prince-Bishop of Würzburg. The Augustinian monks had to leave town when the first Protestant priest took over the Ministry of Münnerstadt in 1552. In 1585 Prince-Bischop Julius Echter purchased a large part of the town that was not already owned by the Bishops of Würzburg. As a result, approximately 400 Protestants, mostly craftsmen, left the town. In 1631 the region suffered from the effects of the Thirty Years' War. Swedish invaders took the town. In 1641 a miracle is supposed to have taken place that protected Münnerstadt from more devastation. The Augustinians returned in 1652, rebuilding their abbey and in 1685 they took back control of the Ministry of Münnerstadt.

=== Annexation ===
During the Napoleonic Wars, Franconia, and with it Münnerstadt, was annexed by Bavaria in 1803. During mediatisation the abbey of Maria Bildhausen was disbanded, the buildings sold or destroyed. In 1804 Münnerstadt became the seat of a federal court. The Teutonic Order was required to leave the town and its possessions were claimed by the town council. The Congress of Vienna later officially awarded Franconia and Münnerstadt to the Kingdom of Bavaria. The town was the local government seat but continued to lose importance. By the early 1900s it was just a locality in the district of Bad Kissingen.

=== Modern times ===
During World War II, the Marienkapelle, houses and one of the town gates were destroyed by bombing and upon entry of the U.S. forces into the town. With the establishment of East Germany, businesses from Thuringia relocated to Münnerstadt. Some of them have attained international importance.

In 1990, traffic on the Bundesstrasse 19 was rerouted from the town center to the west side of town and the railway to Erfurt was opened after a 50 years' pause. In the winter of 2005 Autobahn 71 was opened for traffic. Its 600-meter-long (2,000 ft) bridge between Münnerstadt and Althausen had a major impact on the local landscape.

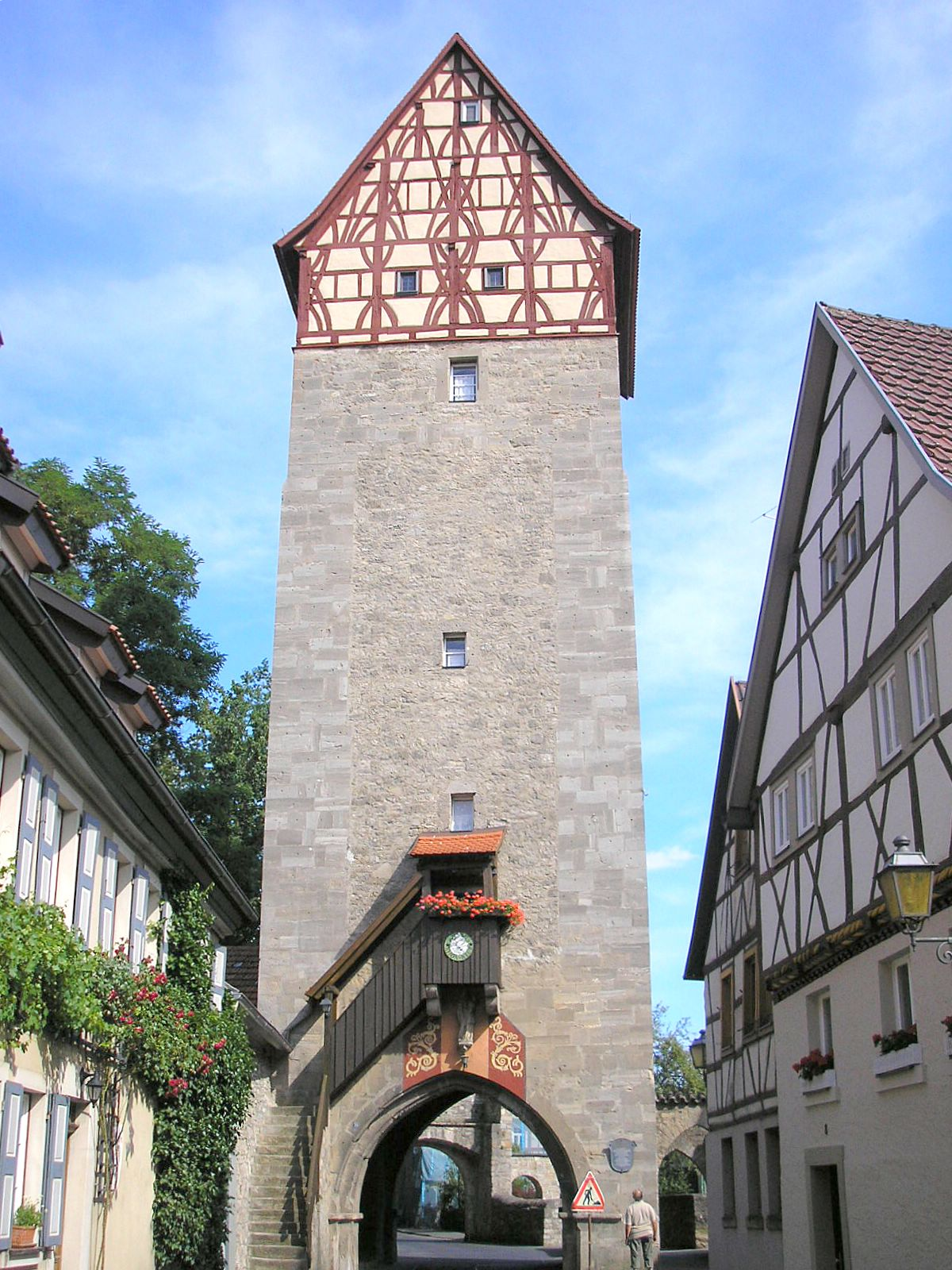
Jörgen gate (Jörgentor)

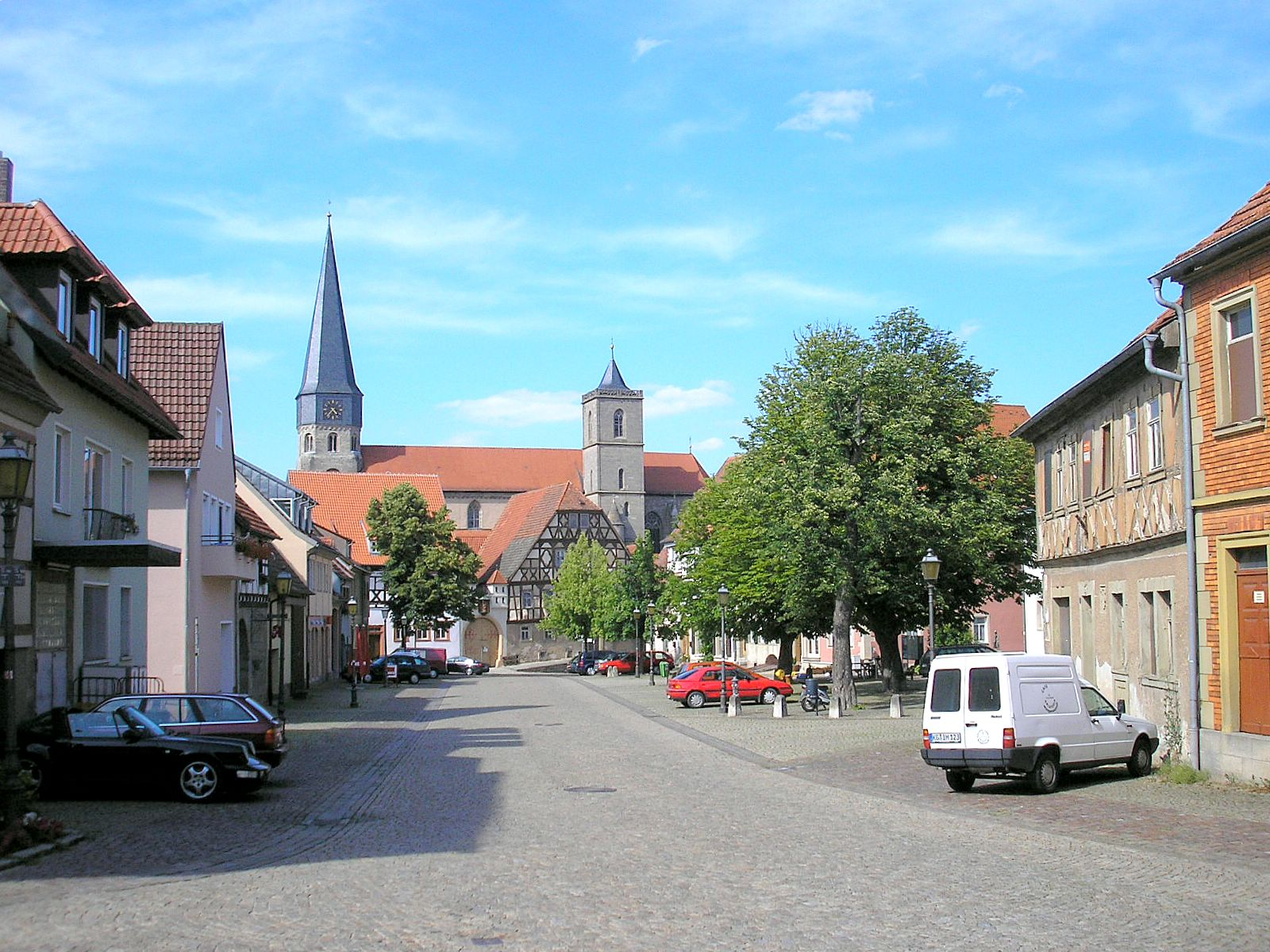
Church Maria Magdalena

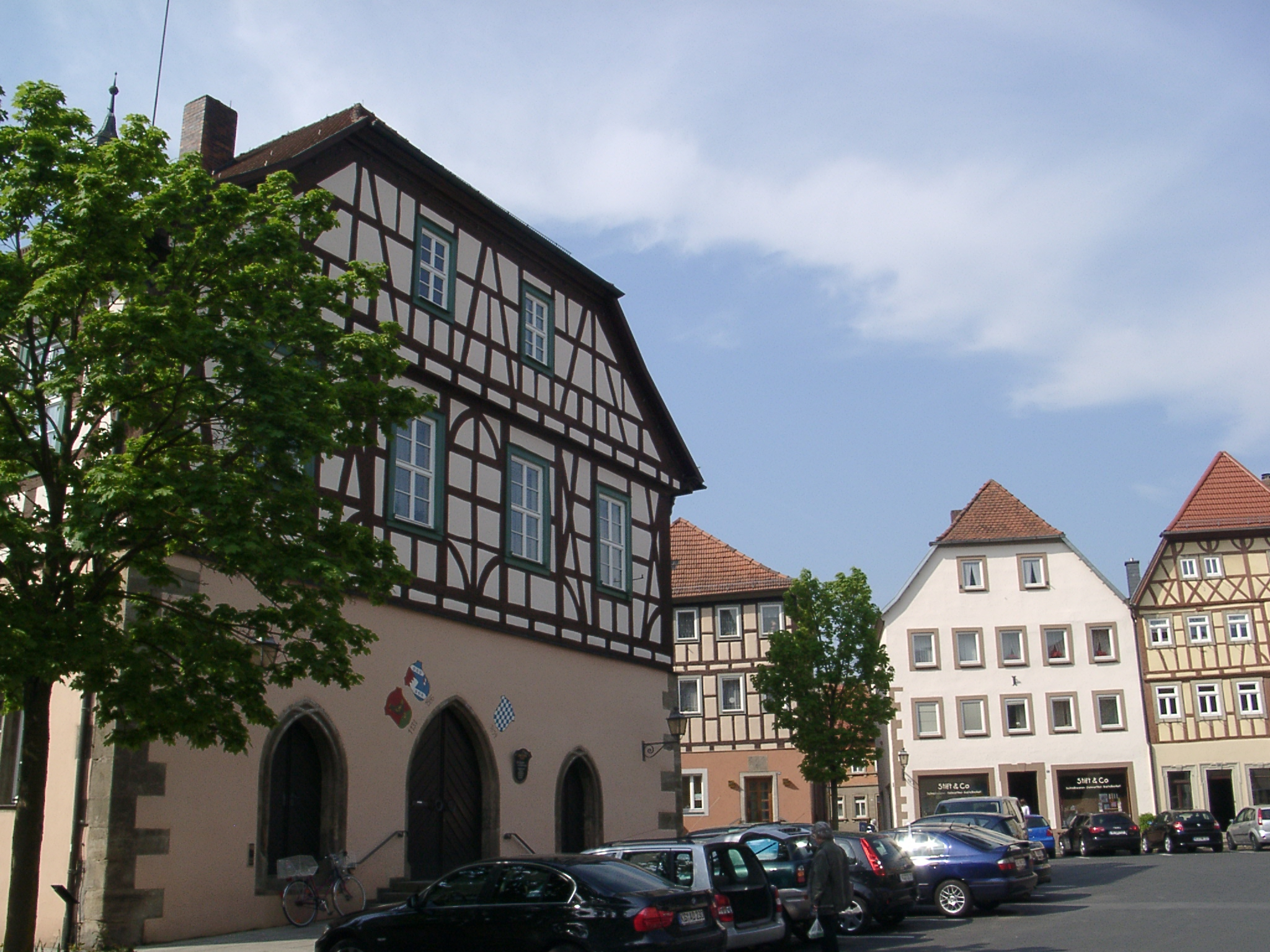
Münnerstadt town hall

== Governance ==
=== Mayor ===
Since May 2008 the mayor of Münnerstadt has been 2008 Helmut Blank (CSU). He was reelected in 2014 with 60.3% of the votes. In March 2020 Michael Kastl was elected mayor.

== Notable people ==
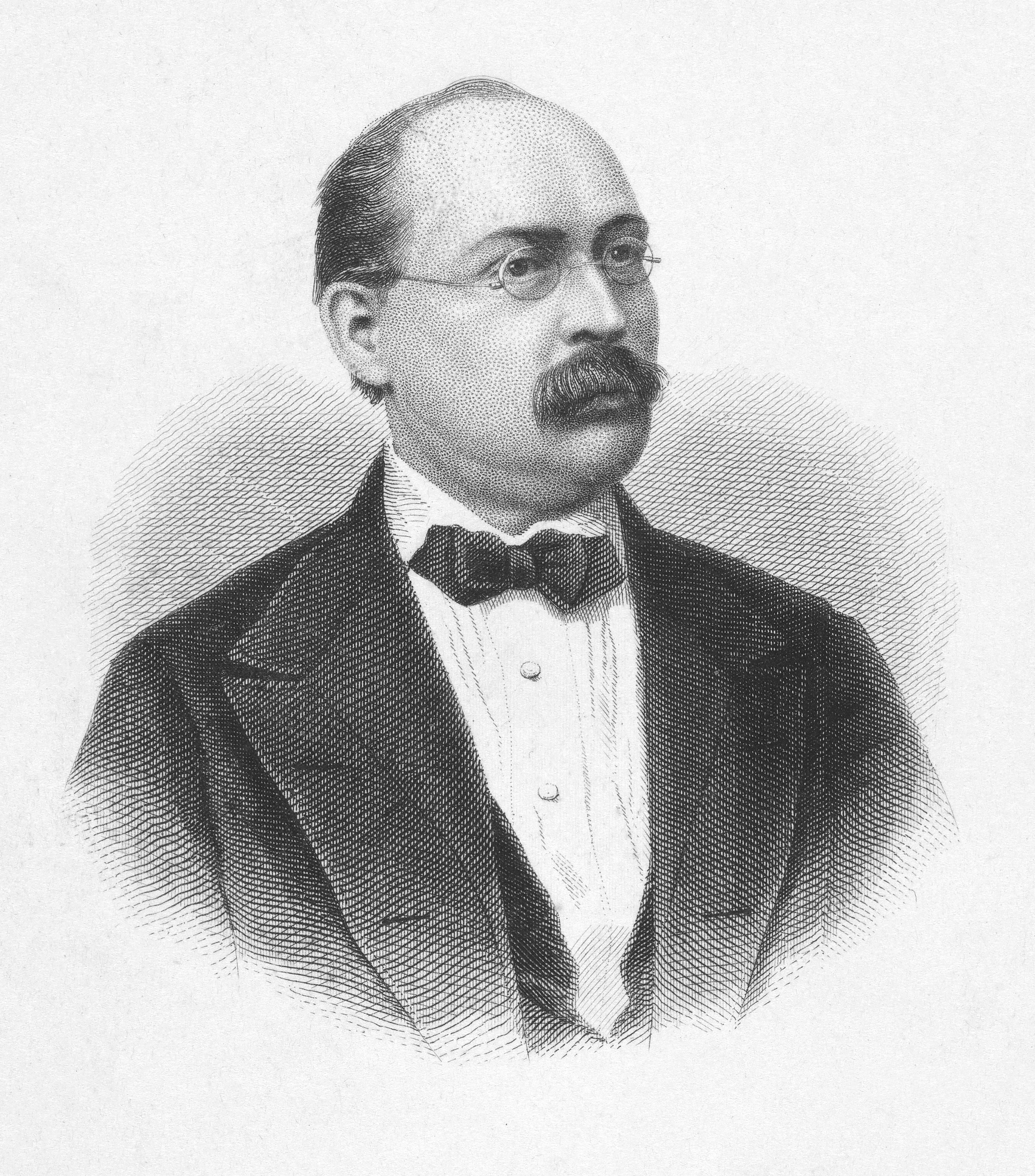
Johann von Lutz in 1871

- Georg Anton Schäffer (1779-1836), doctor and adventurer, visited Austria, Turkey, Russia, Hawaii and Brazil.
- Johann von Lutz (1826-1890), chairman of the Bavarian Council of Ministers from 1884 to 1890.
- Josef Schreiner (1922-2002), theologian in Würzburg and Münster
- Anton Schlembach (born 1932), theologian, Bishop of Speyer 1983- 2007
