= Ransbach (river) =

River in Germany

Location
- Country: Germany
- State: Bavaria

Physical characteristics
- Mouth
  - location: Lauer
  - coordinates: 50.2013°N 10.2526°E
- Length: 13.6 km (8.5 mi)

Basin features
- Progression: Lauer→ Franconian Saale→ Main→ Rhine→ North Sea

Ransbach (German pronunciation: [ˈʁansbax]) is a river of Bavaria, Germany. It is a right tributary of the Lauer near Poppenlauer.

== See also ==
- List of rivers of Bavaria
