= Geißler (Lauer) =

River in Germany

Location
- Country: Germany
- State: Bavaria

Physical characteristics
- Mouth
  - location: Lauer
  - coordinates: 50.1807°N 10.3464°E
- Length: 13.9 km (8.6 mi)

Basin features
- Progression: Lauer→ Franconian Saale→ Main→ Rhine→ North Sea

Geißler is a river of Lower Franconia, Bavaria, Germany. The Geißler is about 14 kilometres (8.7 mi) long. It is a left tributary of the Lauer near Stadtlauringen.

== See also ==
- List of rivers of Bavaria
