= Maß (Lauer) =

River in Germany

Location
- Country: Germany
- States: Bavaria

Physical characteristics
- Mouth
  - location: Lauer
  - coordinates: 50.1858°N 10.2789°E

Basin features
- Progression: Lauer→ Franconian Saale→ Main→ Rhine→ North Sea

Maß is a river of Bavaria, Germany. It is a left tributary of the Lauer in Maßbach.

== See also ==
- List of rivers of Bavaria
