= Milz =

Milz may refer to:

== Places ==
- Milz (river), of Bavaria and Thuringia, Germany
- Milz (Römhild), a village in Thuringia, Germany, part of the town Römhild

== People ==
- Jules Alexandre Milz (1861–1902), Belgian soldier who explored the northeast of the Congo Free State.
