= Adelsberg =

Adelsberg may refer to:

- Adelsberg, the German name for Postojna, a town in Inner Carniola, Slovenia
- Adelsberg (Gemünden am Main), a settlement in Main-Spessart, Bavaria, Germany
- Adelsberg (hill), a mountain of Saxony, Germany
