= Schondra (river) =

River in Germany

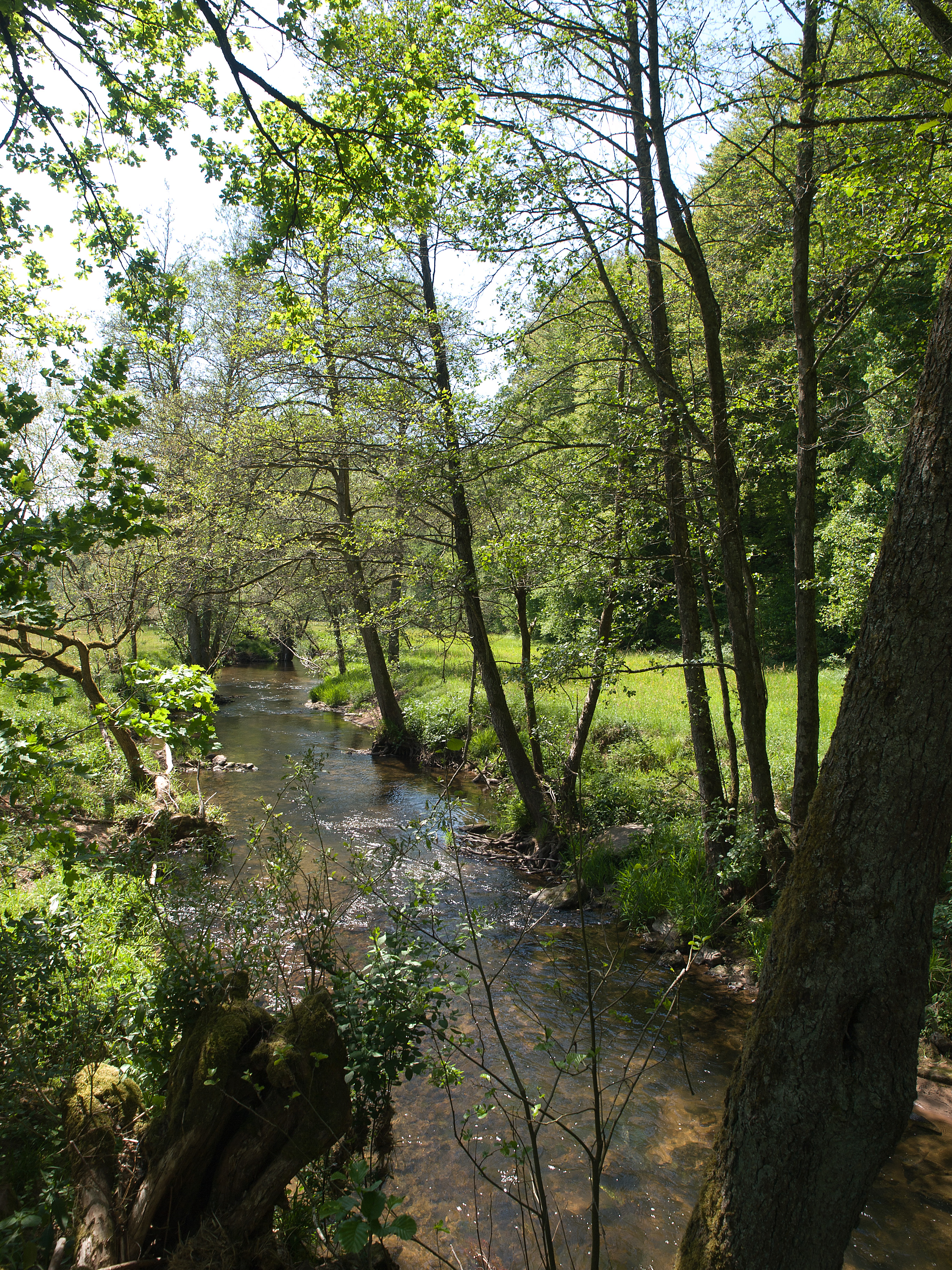

Location
- Country: Germany
- State: Bavaria

Physical characteristics
- Mouth
  - location: Franconian Saale
  - coordinates: 50.1189°N 9.7392°E
- Length: 31.3 km (19.4 mi)
- Basin size: 164 km^{2} (63 sq mi)

Basin features
- Progression: Franconian Saale→ Main→ Rhine→ North Sea

Schondra is a river of Bavaria, Germany. It is a right tributary of the Franconian Saale, which it joins in Gräfendorf.

== See also ==
- List of rivers of Bavaria
