= Rödelmaier =

- Municipality
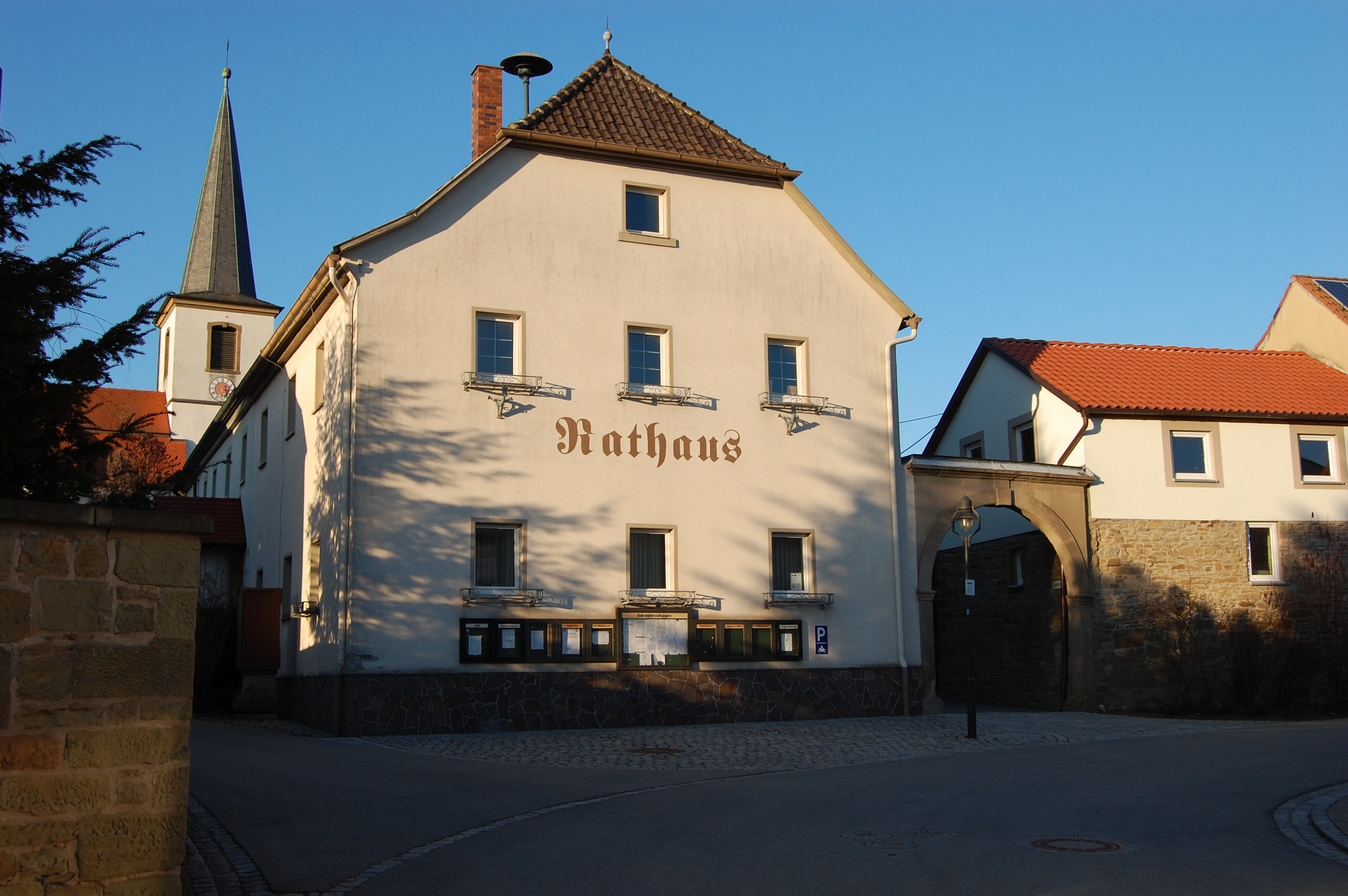
- Town hall

- Coat of arms

- Location of Rödelmaier within Rhön-Grabfeld district
- Interactive map of Rödelmaier
- Location within Germany Location within Bavaria
- Coordinates: 50°19′N 10°17′E
- Country: Germany
- State: Bavaria
- Admin. region: Unterfranken
- District: Rhön-Grabfeld
- Municipal assoc.: Bad Neustadt an der Saale

Government
  - Mayor (2020–26): Michael Pöhnlein

Area
  - Total: 6.28 km^{2} (2.42 sq mi)
- Elevation: 344 m (1,129 ft)

Population (2025-12-31)
  - Total: 948
  - Density: 151/km^{2} (391/sq mi)
- Time zone: UTC+01:00 (CET)
  - Summer (DST): UTC+02:00 (CEST)
- Postal codes: 97618
- Dialling codes: 09771
- Vehicle registration: NES
- Website: www.roedelmaier.de

Rödelmaier is a municipality in the district of Rhön-Grabfeld in Bavaria in Germany.
