= Burglauer =

- Municipality
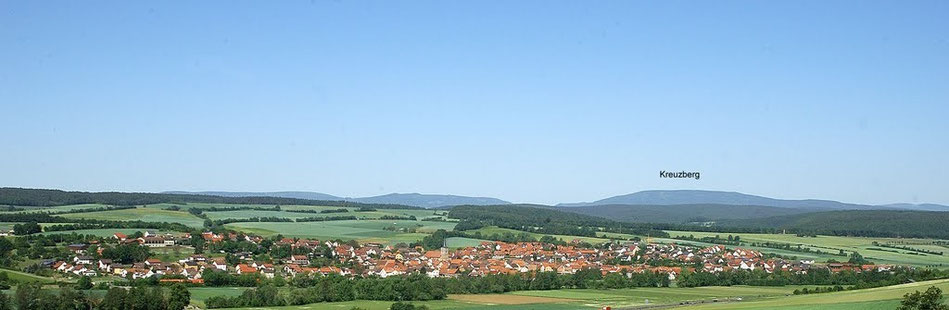
- Panorama view of Burglauer

- Coat of arms

- Location of Burglauer within Rhön-Grabfeld district
- Interactive map of Burglauer
- Location within Germany Location within Bavaria
- Coordinates: 50°16′N 10°11′E
- Country: Germany
- State: Bavaria
- Admin. region: Lower Franconia
- District: Rhön-Grabfeld
- Municipal assoc.: Bad Neustadt an der Saale

Government
  - Mayor (2020–26): Marco Heinickel (CSU)

Area
  - Total: 13.95 km^{2} (5.39 sq mi)
- Elevation: 240 m (790 ft)

Population (2025-12-31)
  - Total: 1,710
  - Density: 123/km^{2} (317/sq mi)
- Time zone: UTC+01:00 (CET)
  - Summer (DST): UTC+02:00 (CEST)
- Postal codes: 97724
- Dialling codes: 09733
- Vehicle registration: NES
- Website: www.burglauer.de

Burglauer is a municipality in the district of Rhön-Grabfeld in Bavaria, Germany. It lies on the river Lauer.

Its history as a municipality dates back to 1818. As of 2016-12-31, it had a population of 1,664.
