= Thulba =

River in Germany

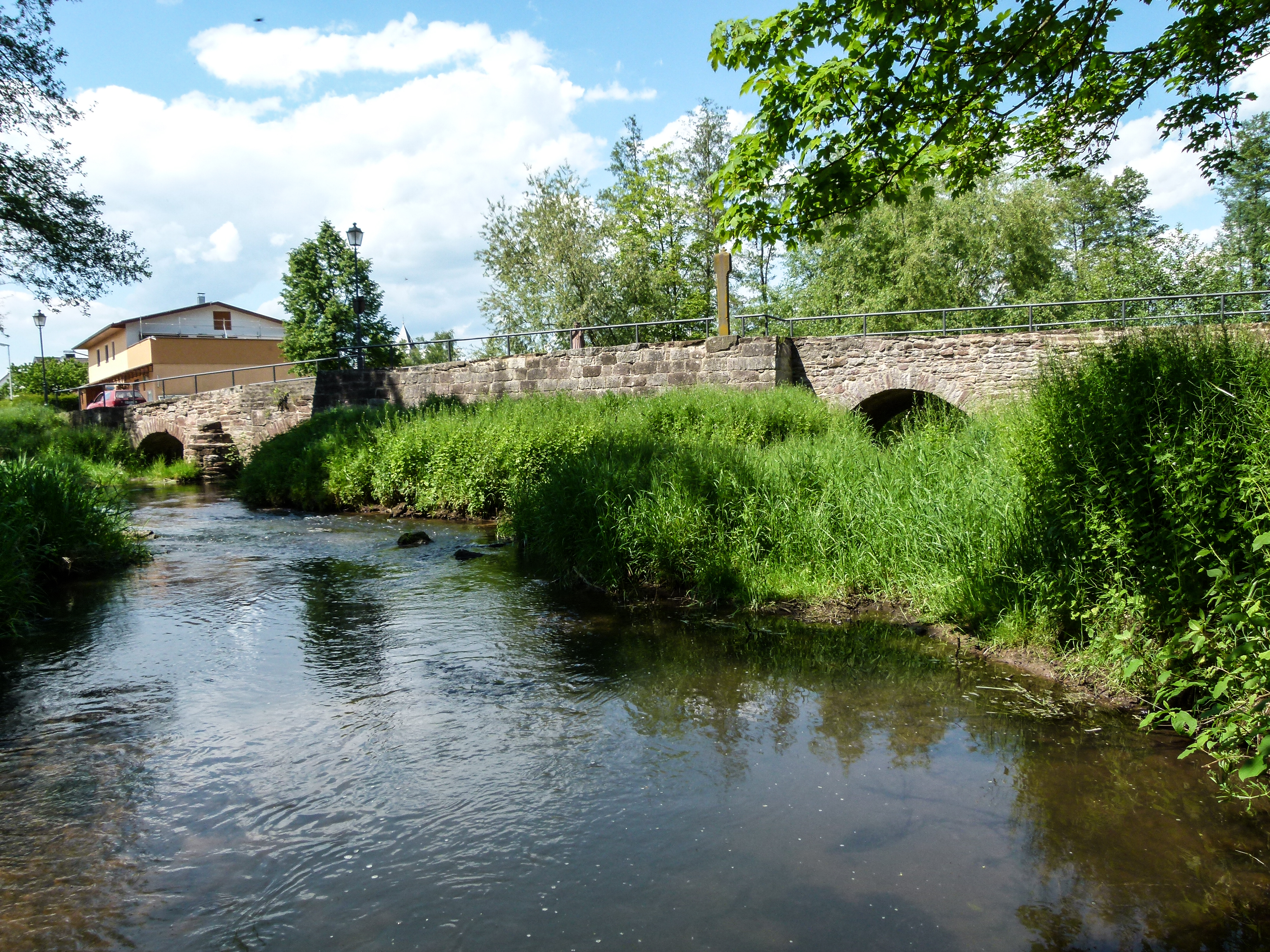
- Bridge over the Thulba in Thulba (Oberthulba)

Location
- Country: Germany
- State: Bavaria

Physical characteristics
- Mouth
  - location: Franconian Saale
  - coordinates: 50.1156°N 9.8754°E
- Length: 32.1 km (19.9 mi)
- Basin size: 140 km^{2} (54 sq mi)

Basin features
- Progression: Franconian Saale→ Main→ Rhine→ North Sea

Thulba is a river of Bavaria, Germany. It flows into the Franconian Saale near Hammelburg.

== See also ==
- List of rivers of Bavaria
