= Bad Neustadt an der Saale (Verwaltungsgemeinschaft) =

- Verwaltungsgemeinschaft
- Location of Bad Neustadt an der Saale within Rhön-Grabfeld district
- Interactive map of Bad Neustadt an der Saale
- Location within Germany Location within Bavaria
- Coordinates: 50°20′N 10°13′E
- Country: Germany
- State: Bavaria
- Admin. region: Lower Franconia
- District: Rhön-Grabfeld
- Seat: Bad Neustadt an der Saale
- Subdivisions: 7 municipalities

Area
  - Total: 84.10 km^{2} (32.47 sq mi)

Population (2025-12-31)
  - Total: 12,303
  - Density: 146.3/km^{2} (378.9/sq mi)
- Time zone: UTC+01:00 (CET)
  - Summer (DST): UTC+02:00 (CEST)
- Website: www.bad-neustadt-vgem.de

Bad Neustadt an der Saale is a Verwaltungsgemeinschaft (municipal association) in the district Rhön-Grabfeld in Bavaria, Germany. Its seat is in Bad Neustadt an der Saale, itself not part of the Verwaltungsgemeinschaft.

It consists of the following municipalities:

1. Burglauer
2. Hohenroth
3. Niederlauer
4. Rödelmaier
5. Salz
6. Schönau an der Brend
7. Strahlungen
