= Niederlauer =

- Municipality
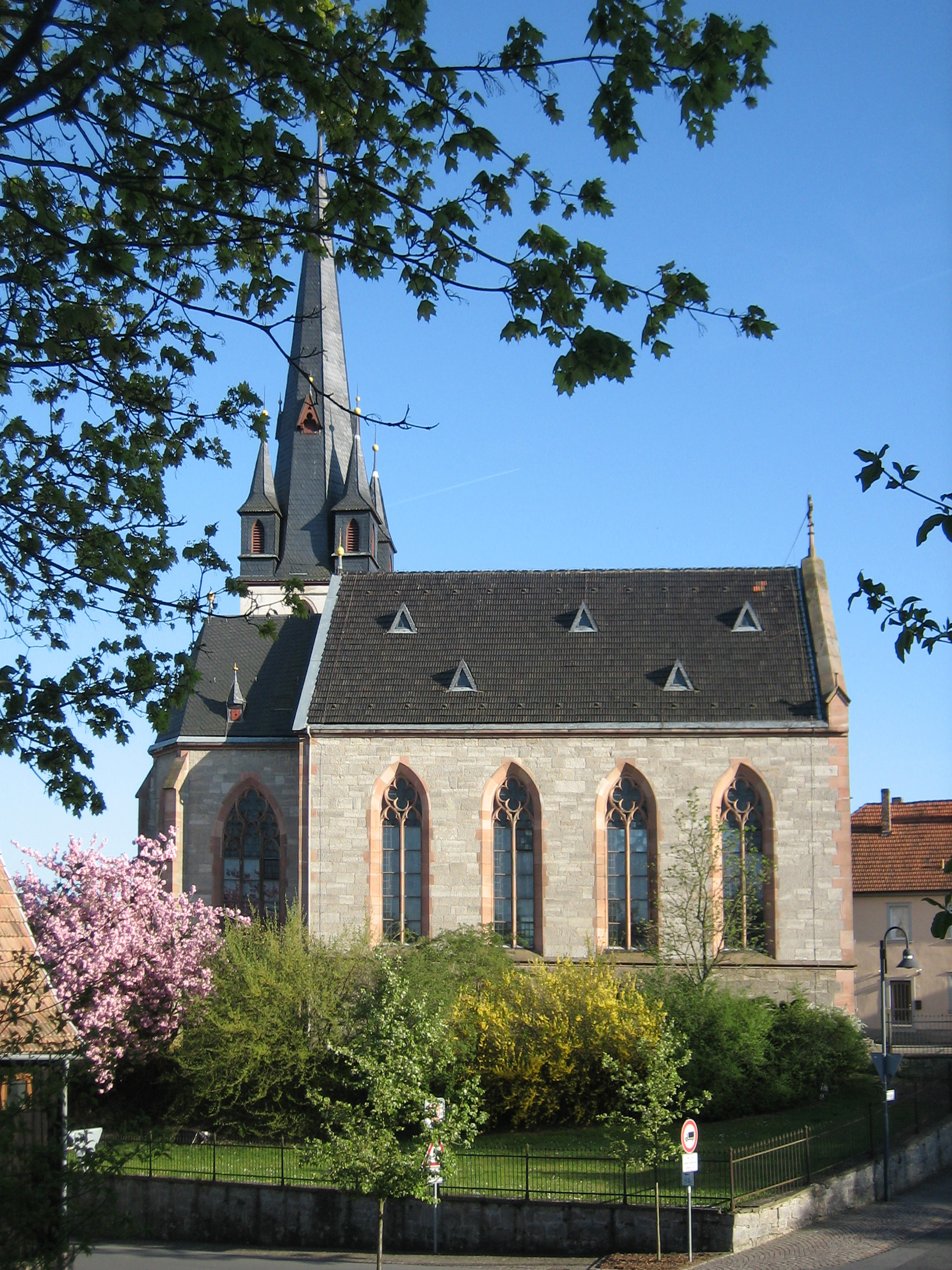
- Church of Saint Catherine

- Coat of arms

- Location of Niederlauer within Rhön-Grabfeld district
- Interactive map of Niederlauer
- Location within Germany Location within Bavaria
- Coordinates: 50°17′45.9917″N 10°10′44.3608″E
- Country: Germany
- State: Bavaria
- Admin. region: Unterfranken
- District: Rhön-Grabfeld
- Municipal assoc.: Bad Neustadt an der Saale

Government
  - Mayor (2020–26): Holger Schmitt (FW)

Area
  - Total: 9.07 km^{2} (3.50 sq mi)
- Elevation: 242 m (794 ft)

Population (2025-12-31)
  - Total: 1,652
  - Density: 182/km^{2} (472/sq mi)
- Time zone: UTC+01:00 (CET)
  - Summer (DST): UTC+02:00 (CEST)
- Postal codes: 97618
- Dialling codes: 09771
- Vehicle registration: NES
- Website: www.niederlauer.de

Niederlauer is a municipality in the district of Rhön-Grabfeld in Bavaria in Germany. The rivers Franconian Saale and Lauer flow through the village.
