= Gräfendorf =

- Municipality
- Coat of arms

- Location of Gräfendorf within Main-Spessart district
- Interactive map of Gräfendorf
- Location within Germany Location within Bavaria
- Coordinates: 50°7′N 9°45′E
- Country: Germany
- State: Bavaria
- Admin. region: Unterfranken
- District: Main-Spessart
- Municipal assoc.: Gemünden am Main

Government
  - Mayor (2020–26): Johannes Wagenpfahl

Area
  - Total: 45.30 km^{2} (17.49 sq mi)
- Elevation: 167–231 m (548–758 ft)

Population (2025-12-31)
  - Total: 1,283
  - Density: 28.32/km^{2} (73.35/sq mi)
- Time zone: UTC+01:00 (CET)
  - Summer (DST): UTC+02:00 (CEST)
- Postal codes: 97782
- Dialling codes: 09357
- Vehicle registration: MSP
- Website: www.graefendorf.de

Gräfendorf is a municipality in the Main-Spessart district in the Regierungsbezirk of Lower Franconia (Unterfranken) in Bavaria, Germany and a member of the Verwaltungsgemeinschaft (Administrative Community) of Gemünden am Main.

== Geography ==
=== Location ===
Gräfendorf lies in the Würzburg Region near Gemünden am Main.

=== Constituent communities ===
The community has the following Gemarkungen (traditional rural cadastral areas) and Ortsteile: Gräfendorf, Michelau an der Saale, Schonderfeld, Weickersgrüben, Wolfsmünster.

== History ==
In Gräfendorf the Barons of Thüngen and the Juliusspital in Würzburg – a hospital foundation that still exists today – shared the lordship. The latter's rights passed under the Reichsdeputationshauptschluss in 1803 to Bavaria, and in 1805 to the Grand Duchy of Aschaffenburg. The former's rights were traded by Aschaffenburg in 1808, after mediatization, to the Grand Duchy. In 1813, the community became definitively Bavarian. In the course of administrative reform in Bavaria, the current community came into being with the Gemeindeedikt (“Municipal Edict”) of 1818.

=== Population development ===
Within town limits, 1,729 inhabitants were counted in 1970, 1,452 in 1987, 1,554 in 2000 and in 2006 1,601.

== Politics ==
The mayor is Johannes Wagenpfahl, elected in March 2020.

Municipal taxes in 1999 amounted to €576,000 (converted), of which net business taxes amounted to €71,000.

=== Coat of arms ===
The community's arms might be described thus: Per fess in chief azure a bend argent surmounted by three annulets of the first in bend, in base per fess gules and Or a cogwheel spoked of four and toothed of twelve counterchanged.

== Economy and infrastructure ==
According to official statistics, there were 139 workers on the social welfare contribution rolls working in producing businesses in 1998. In trade and transport this was 37, and 470 such workers worked from home. Nobody was employed in processing businesses. Two businesses were in construction, and furthermore, in 1999, there were 58 agricultural operations with a working area of 925 ha, of which 596 ha was cropland and 323 ha was meadowland.

=== Transport ===
Gräfendorf, as well as outlying Wolfsmünster, Michelau and Weickersgrüben, lies on the Fränkische Saaletalbahn (railway) and is served hourly (with the odd gap) by the Erfurter Bahn, a railway service owned and operated by the City of Erfurt, using modern Unterfranken-Shuttle trainsets. Between Gräfendorf and Schonderfeld a stone pillar of the never-finished Reichsautobahn is used as a climbing wall.

=== Education ===
In 1999 the following institutions existed in Gräfendorf:

- Kindergartens: 75 places with 68 children
- Primary schools: 1 with 5 teacher and 139 pupils
