= Strahlungen =

- Municipality
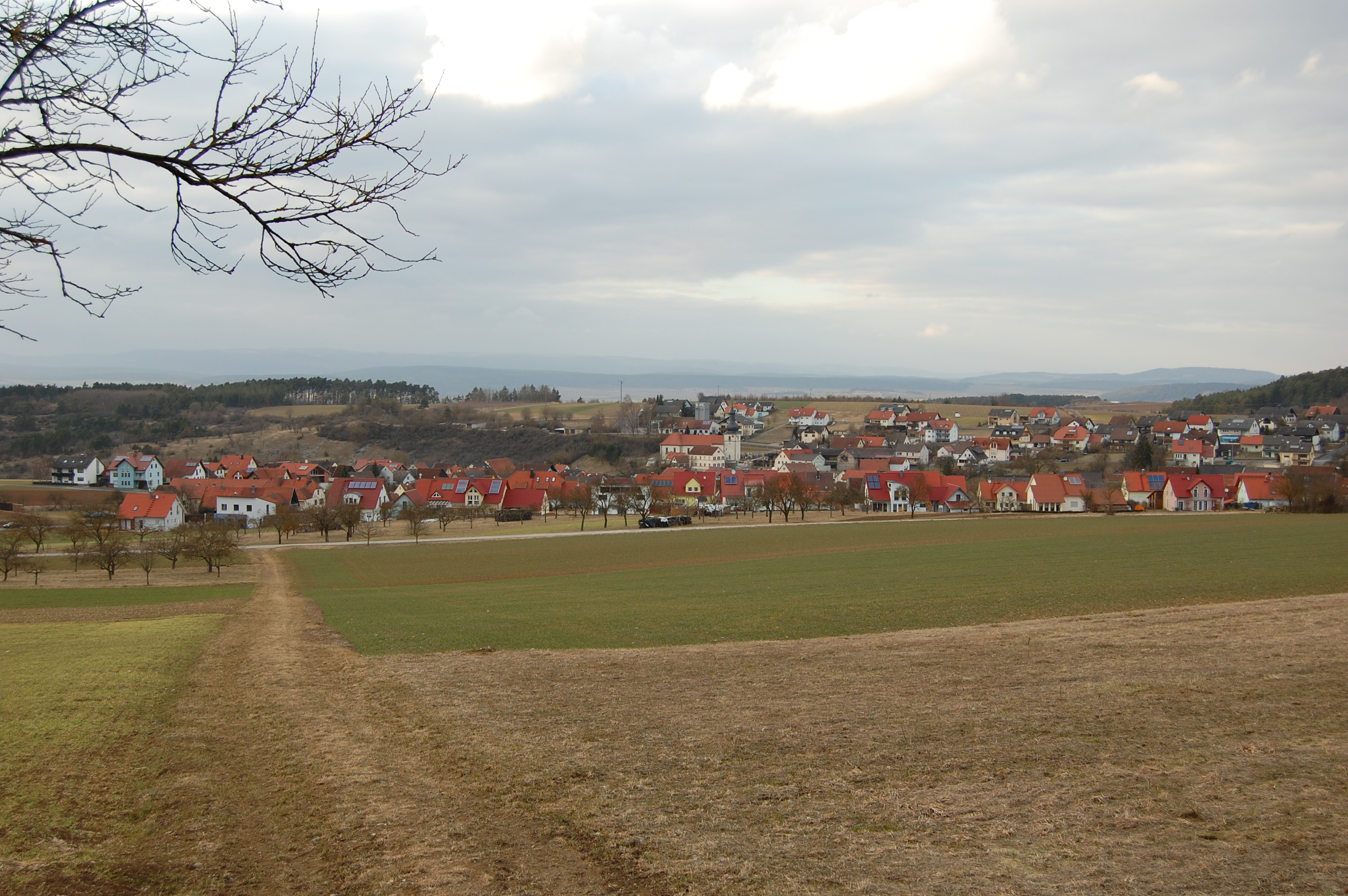
- General view of the village

- Coat of arms

- Location of Strahlungen within Rhön-Grabfeld district
- Interactive map of Strahlungen
- Location within Germany Location within Bavaria
- Coordinates: 50°17′N 10°14′E
- Country: Germany
- State: Bavaria
- Admin. region: Unterfranken
- District: Rhön-Grabfeld
- Municipal assoc.: Bad Neustadt an der Saale

Government
  - Mayor (2020–26): Johannes Hümpfner (CSU)

Area
  - Total: 13.43 km^{2} (5.19 sq mi)
- Elevation: 308 m (1,010 ft)

Population (2025-12-31)
  - Total: 961
  - Density: 71.6/km^{2} (185/sq mi)
- Time zone: UTC+01:00 (CET)
  - Summer (DST): UTC+02:00 (CEST)
- Postal codes: 97618
- Dialling codes: 09733
- Vehicle registration: NES
- Website: www.strahlungen.de

Strahlungen is a municipality in the district of Rhön-Grabfeld in Bavaria in Germany.
