= Scherenburg Castle =

- Scherenburg
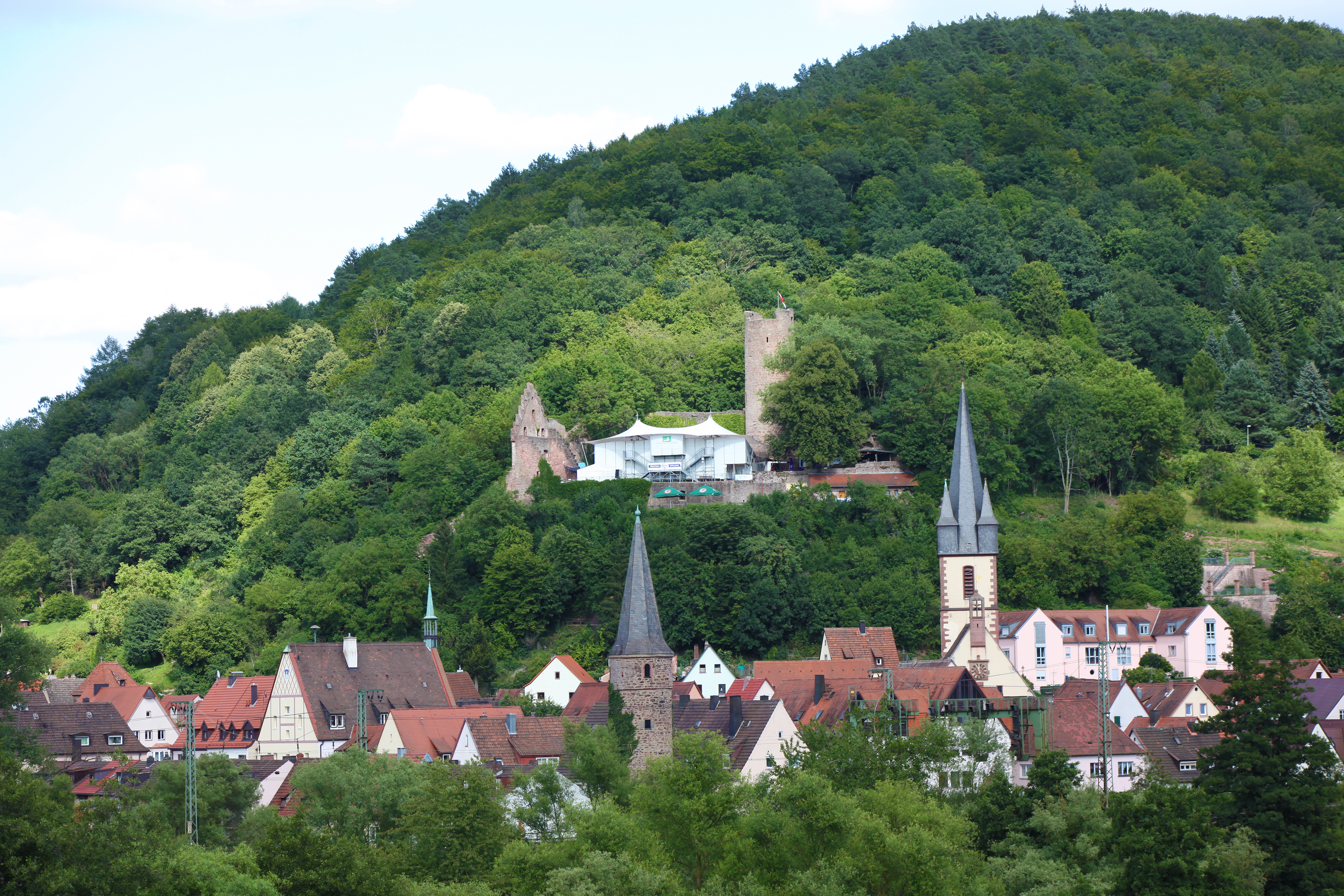
- The ruins of Scherenburg Castle

- Location within Germany
- Alternative names: Schloss Scherenburg

General information
- Type: Hill castle
- Location: Gemünden am Main, Germany
- Coordinates: 50.0567°N 9.6916°E
- Elevation: 200 m (660 ft)
- Completed: before 1243
- Owner: Municipality of Gemünden

Scherenburg Castle (German: Burgruine Scherenburg or Schloss Scherenberg) is a ruined hill castle (hillside castle) at an elevation of 200 m above sea level (NN) which stands on a hillside above the town of Gemünden am Main in the province of Lower Franconia in the German state of Bavaria.

== History ==
The castle was probably built before 1243 by the Counts of Rieneck, to whom the land belonged, as a toll castle to ensure collection of tolls at the river crossing of the River Main and the borders with the state of Würzburg. As a result, there were conflicts with the Bishop of Würzburg, Hermann I of Lobdeburg, who built Slorburg Castle in the immediate vicinity in order to demonstrate his power. In 1243, the dispute was settled by a treaty.

In 1469, the castle finally went to Würzburg and was given the name of its Prince-Elector, Rudolph II of Scherenberg. Until 1598 it was used as the Amtskeller and was inhabited until the 18th century. A wedding took place at the castle chapel in 1732.

In the second half of the 18th century the castle began to fall into ruins. In 1825 it went into private ownership and in 1965 became the property of the town of Gemünden.

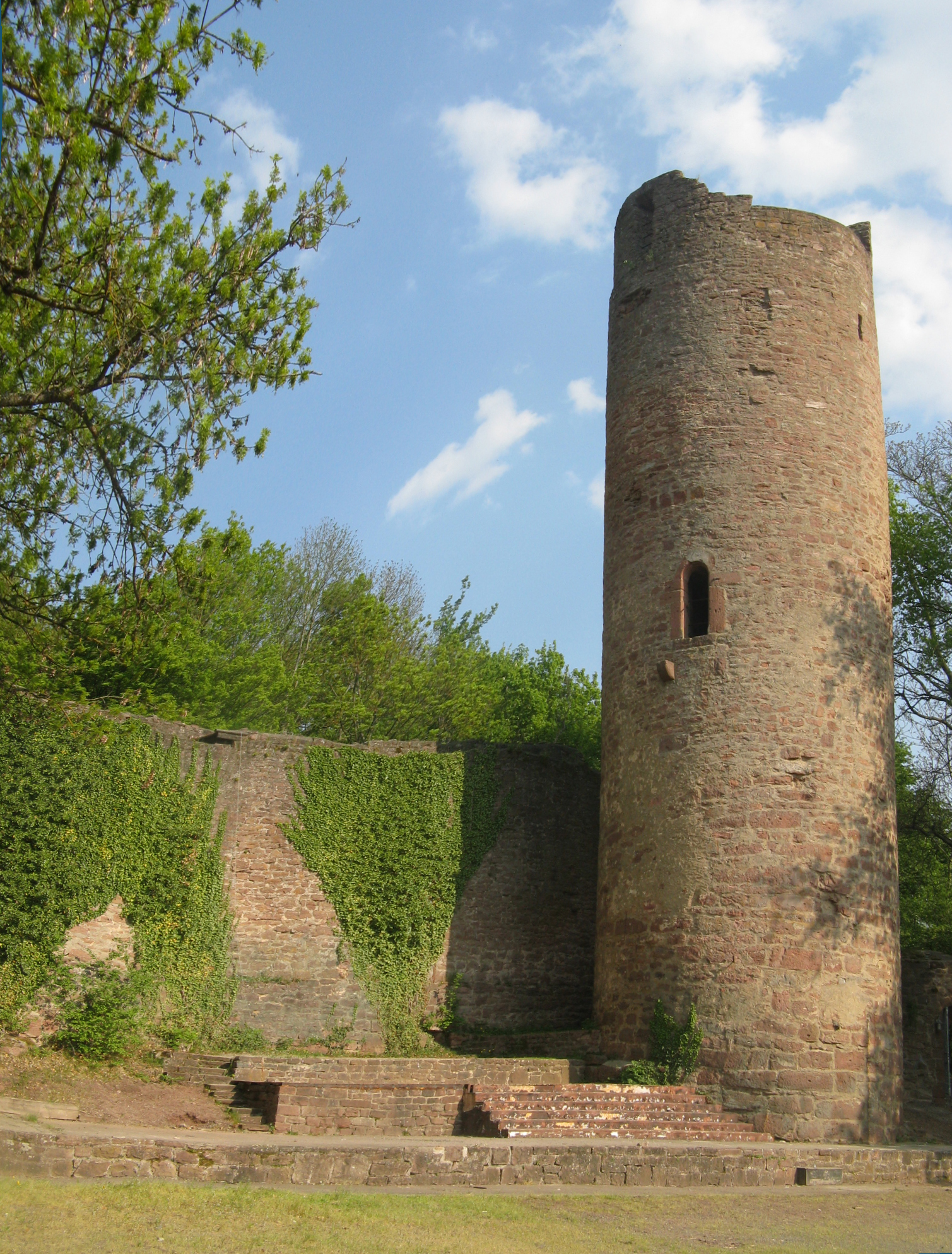
The bergfried of the ruins of Scherenburg

== Description ==
Of the former castle, all that has survived is the castle gate in the southeast, part of the shield wall (once joined to the town walls in a continuous curtain wall), the round bergfried (occupied by bats and therefore no longer climbable), a gable walls of the palas, which had cellars, and a small zwinger (now a terrace with views over the Main and Saale valleys and the Spessart hills).

Since the 1990s, the Scherenburg Festival (an open-air theatre festival) has taken place every summer in the courtyard of the ruins.

== Literature ==
- Walter Schilling: Die Burgen, Schlösser und Herrensitze Unterfrankens, 1st edition. Echter Verlag, Würzburg, 2012, ISBN 978-3-429-03516-7, pp. 330–331.
- Ursula Pfistermeister: Wehrhaftes Franken. Vol. 2: Burgen, Kirchenburgen, Stadtmauern um Würzburg. Verlag Hans Carl, Nuremberg, 2001, ISBN 3-418-00386-9, pp. 41–42.
