= Adelsberg (Gemünden am Main) =

- Ortsteil of Gemünden am Main
- Coat of arms
- Interactive map of Adelsberg
- Location within Germany Location within Bavaria
- Coordinates: 50°2′6″N 9°44′21″E
- Country: Germany
- State: Bavaria
- Admin. region: Unterfranken
- District: Main-Spessart
- Town: Gemünden am Main

Population (2012-12-31)
  - Total: 1,007
- Time zone: UTC+01:00 (CET)
  - Summer (DST): UTC+02:00 (CEST)
- Postal codes: 97737
- Dialling codes: 09351
- Vehicle registration: MSP

Adelsberg is an outlying centre (Stadtteil) of Gemünden am Main in the Main-Spessart district, in Bavaria, Germany. It lies roughly 40 km northwest of Würzburg.
