= Milz (river) =

River in Germany

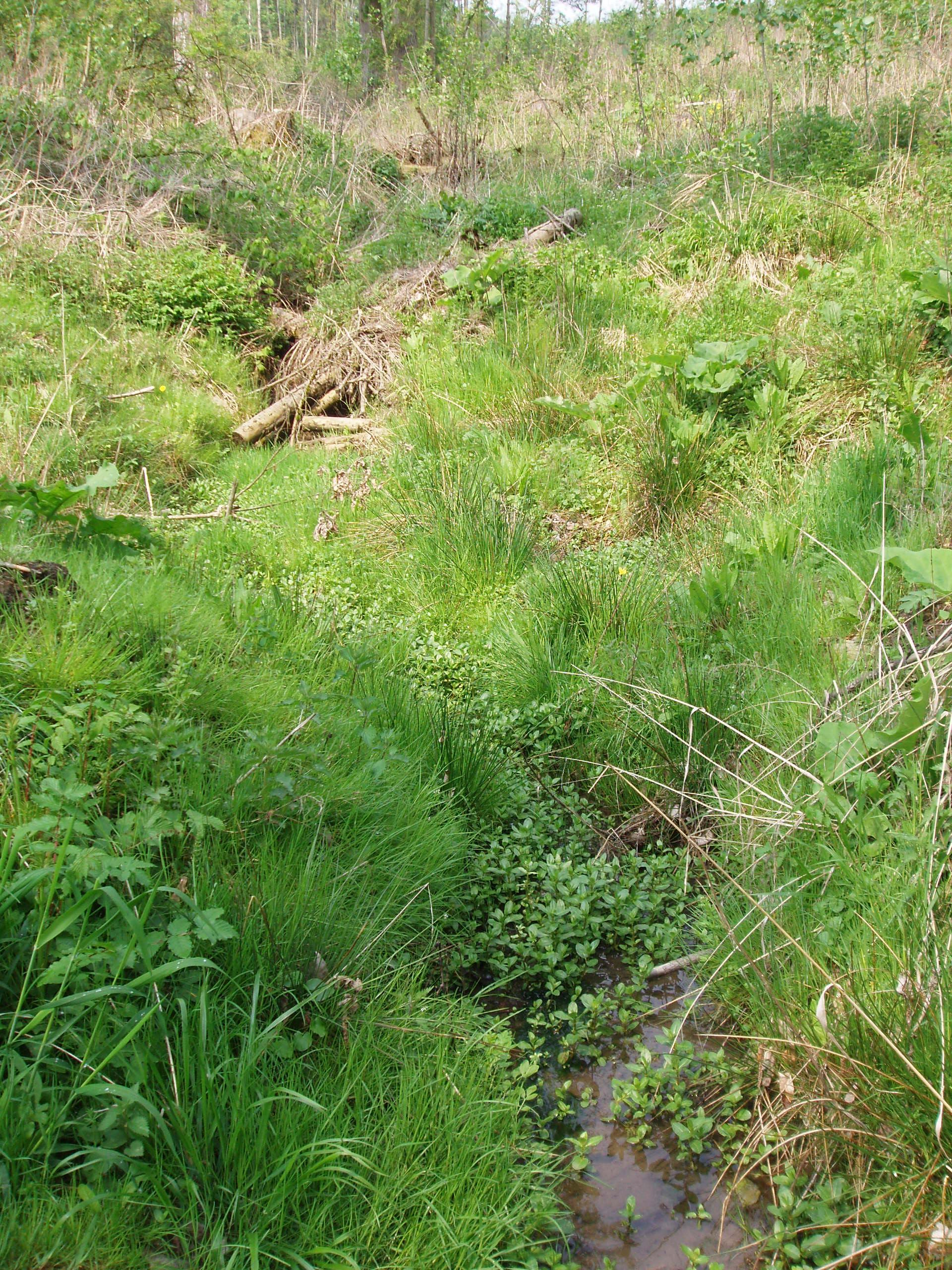
- The source of the Milz

Location
- Country: Germany
- States: Bavaria and Thuringia

Physical characteristics
- Mouth
  - location: Franconian Saale
  - coordinates: 50.3164°N 10.3628°E
- Length: 36.4 km (22.6 mi)
- Basin size: 186 km^{2} (72 sq mi)

Basin features
- Progression: Franconian Saale→ Main→ Rhine→ North Sea

Milz (German pronunciation: [mɪlts]) is a river of Bavaria and of Thuringia, Germany. It flows into the Franconian Saale in Saal an der Saale.

== See also ==
- List of rivers of Bavaria
- List of rivers of Thuringia
