= Gemünden am Main =

- Town
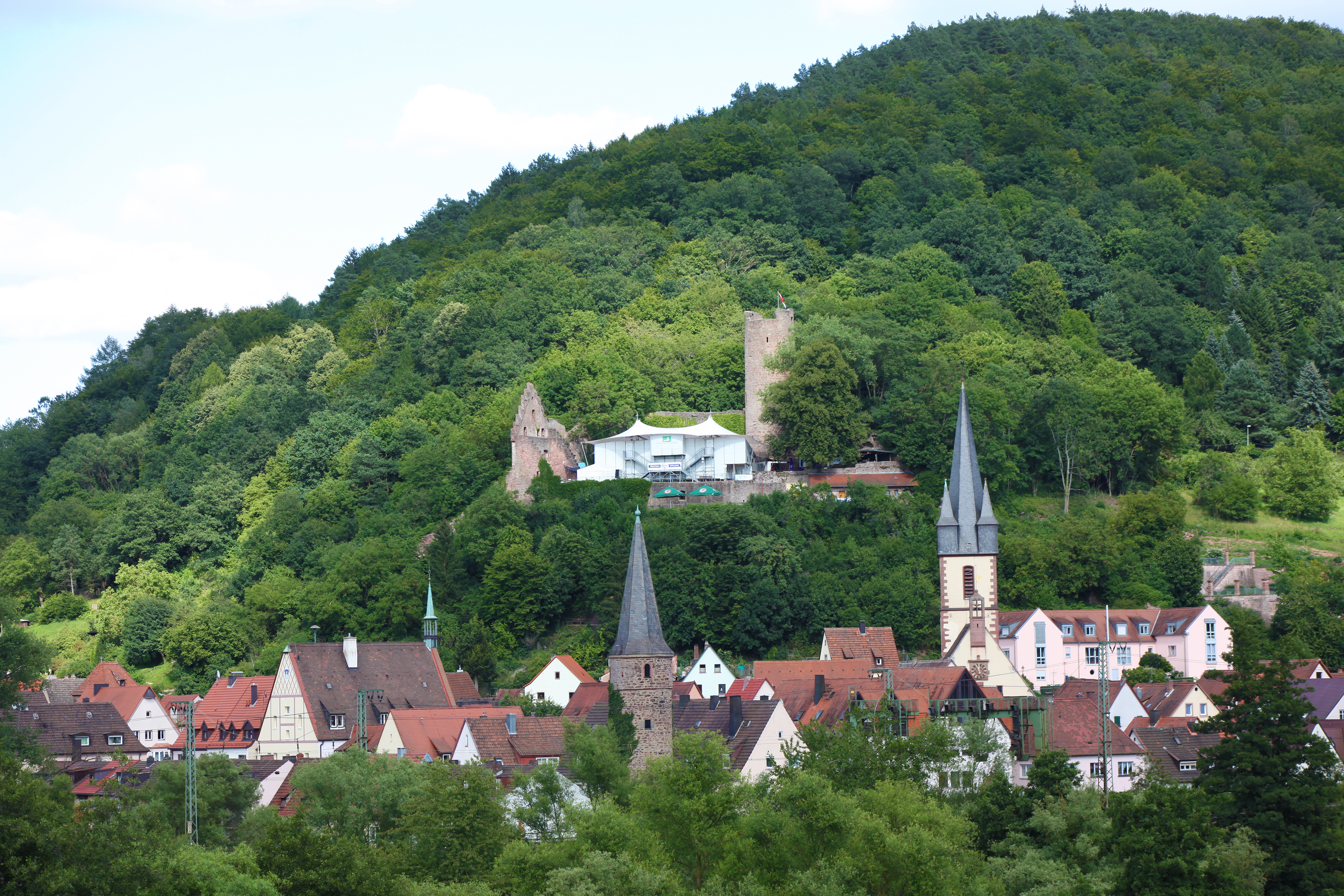
- Scherenburg above Gemünden

- Coat of arms

- Location of Gemünden am Main within Main-Spessart district
- Interactive map of Gemünden am Main
- Location within Germany Location within Bavaria
- Coordinates: 50°2′59″N 9°42′20″E
- Country: Germany
- State: Bavaria
- Admin. region: Unterfranken
- District: Main-Spessart

Government
  - Mayor (2020–26): Jürgen Lippert

Area
  - Total: 75.06 km^{2} (28.98 sq mi)
- Elevation: 160 m (520 ft)

Population (2025-12-31)
  - Total: 10,021
  - Density: 133.5/km^{2} (345.8/sq mi)
- Time zone: UTC+01:00 (CET)
  - Summer (DST): UTC+02:00 (CEST)
- Postal codes: 97737
- Dialling codes: 09351
- Vehicle registration: MSP
- Website: www.stadt-gemuenden.de

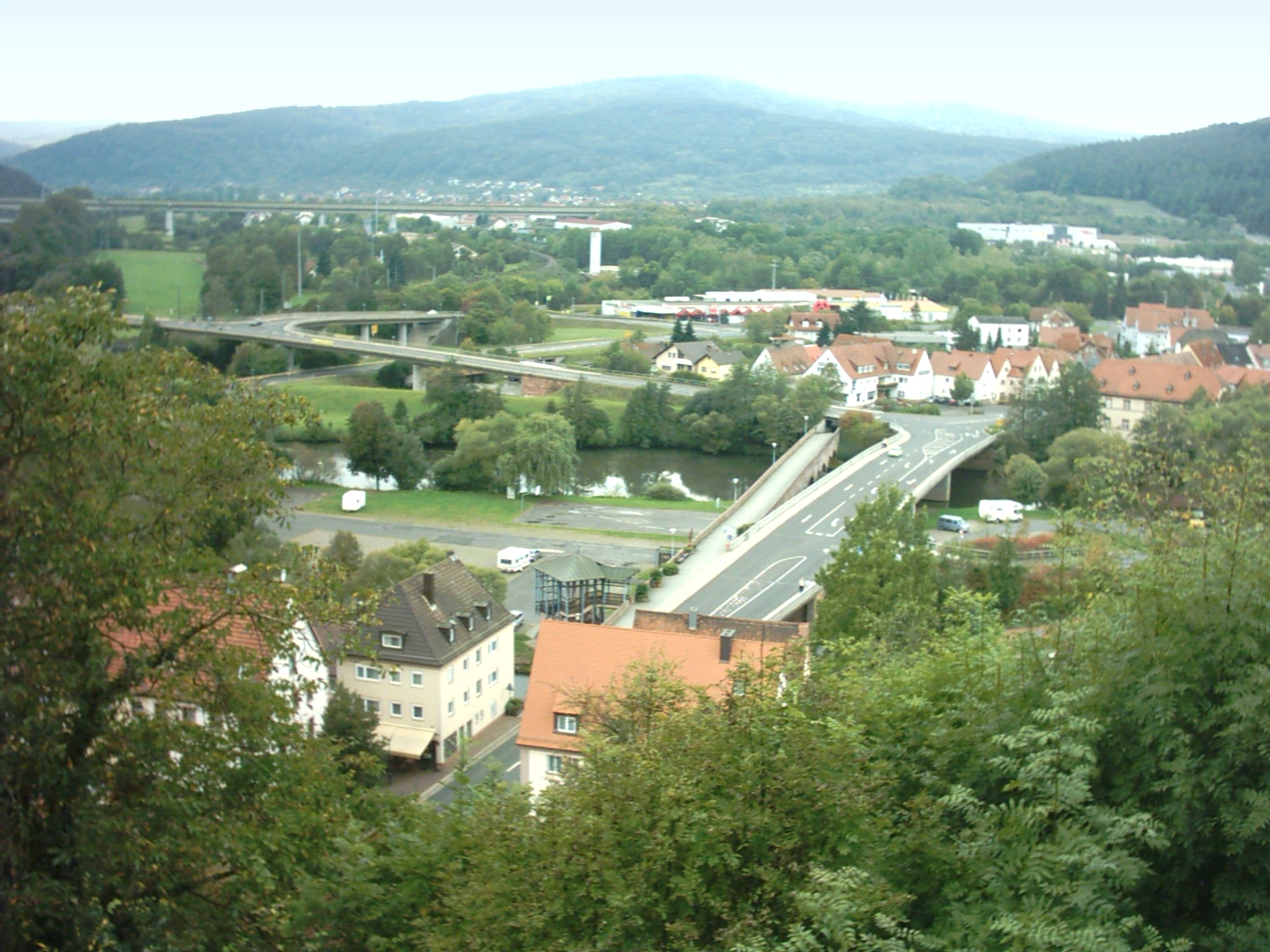
Old and new bridges in Gemünden

Gemünden am Main (German pronunciation: [ɡəˈmʏndn̩ ʔam ˈmaɪn]; officially Gemünden a.Main) is a town in the Main-Spessart district in the Regierungsbezirk of Lower Franconia (Unterfranken) in Bavaria, Germany and lies roughly 40 km down the Main from Würzburg. Gemünden has around 10,000 inhabitants.

== Geography ==
=== Location ===
Gemünden is located in the Main-Spessart district in the Regierungsbezirk of Lower Franconia (Unterfranken) in Bavaria, on the Main, around 40 km downriver from Würzburg. Within the town, the River Sinn flows into the Franconian Saale, which itself then discharges into the Main. The Main river changes its direction at Gemünden, from northwest to west, marking the transition from the Maindreieck ("Main Triangle") to the Mainviereck ("Main quadrangle") near Lohr am Main.

Gemünden lies on the Birkenhainer Strasse, an ancient trade road from Lower Franconia to today's Frankfurt Rhine Main Region.

=== Subdivisions ===
Gemünden's Stadtteile are Adelsberg, Aschenroth, Harrbach, Hofstetten, Hohenroth, Kleinwernfeld, Langenprozelten, Neutzenbrunn, Reichenbuch, Schaippach, Schönau, Seifriedsburg, Wernfeld and Massenbuch.

== History ==
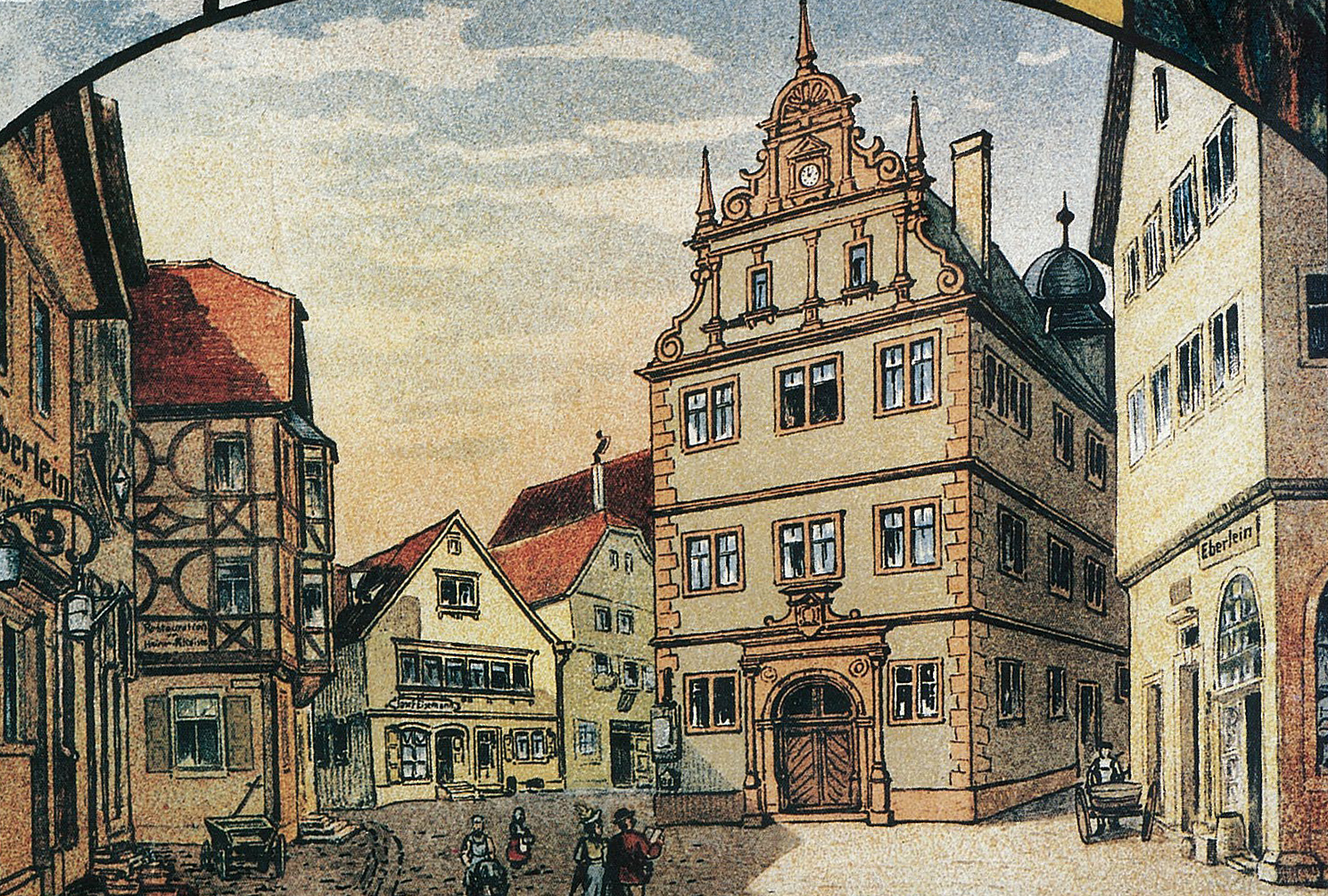
Old town hall

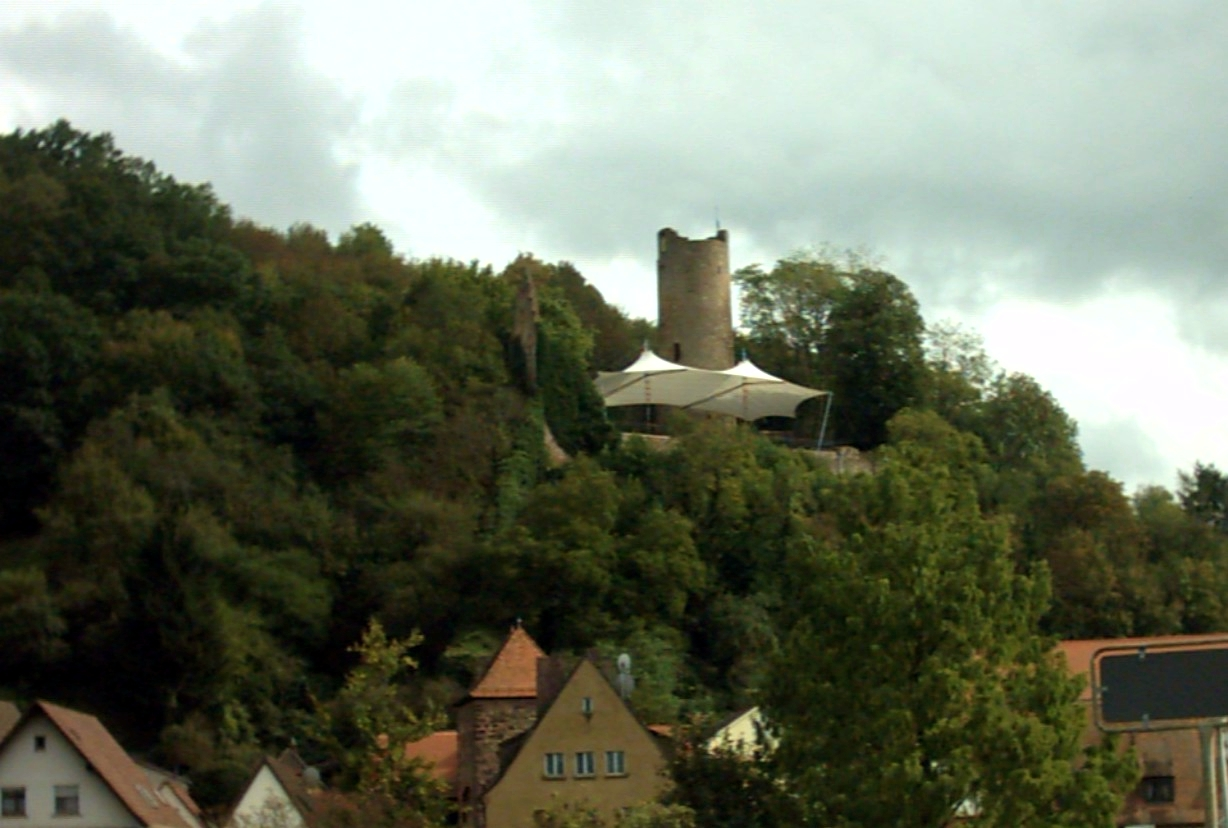
Scherenburg Castle ruins

The local Schönau monastery (Kloster Schönau) was founded in 1189 by Philipp von Thüngen. A Conventual Franciscan monastery since 1699, the monks' main job was to take care of the monastery and pilgrimage church.

The town, which likely had grown out of an early fishing village at the confluence of the three rivers, had its first documentary mention in 1243 in an agreement between Prince-Bishop of Würzburg Hermann I of Lobdeburg and Countess Adelheid of Rieneck. According to the agreement, two thirds of the castle and half of the settlement were subject to the Hochstift (or secular authority) of the Prince-Bishops of Würzburg. This followed attempts by the Counts of Rieneck to expand their territory to the south. At that point, Gemünden had already been awarded the status of town by the Rieneck counts.

The castle above the town, the Scherenburg, had been built by the Rienecks to control the shipping on the Main and the eastern terminus of the Birkenhainer Strasse, an important trade route in the Middle Ages.

The first reference to Gemünden as an oppidum (town) was in a document from 1319. In 1377, Würzburg took control of the whole town but in 1405 the Hochstift Würzburg sold the town to the Counts of Rieneck, reserving a right to buy it back. In 1466, Rudolf von Scherenberg made use of this and returned the town to Würzburg. Under Scherenberg's rule, Gemünden experienced a period of prosperity. The castle was named after him. Besides fishing, winegrowing also was an important source of income.

During the German Peasants' War and the Thirty Years' War the town was spared from significant damage. The town hall was built between 1585 and 1596. The castle became disused and started to fall into ruin in the 18th century.

The Prince-Bishopric of Würzburg was eventually annexed by Bavaria in 1802. Gemünden became a Bavarian district seat (Kreisstadt); a railway link followed in 1854, Ludwig's Western Railway, nowadays the Main–Spessart railway. Gemünden became a railway hub. In 1872 came the opening of the Flieden–Gemünden line, in 1879 the Gemünden–Schweinfurt line and in 1884 the Gemünden – Hammelburg line.

During the time of the National Socialist régime, the Jewish community's synagogue was destroyed on Kristallnacht (9 November 1938) by SA men. During the Second World War, many Soviet prisoners of war had to perform forced labour in operations that were important to the war effort.

Owing to the town's strategically important location as a railway hub, two thirds of it was destroyed by Allied bombing raids and fighting towards the end of the Second World War. In the final days of the war, in April 1945, the railway junction (see also Gemünden station) was the subject of fierce fighting which lasted for six days.

Post-war, the railway was rebuilt and Gemünden once again became an important junction. In 1964, Deutsche Bundesbahn employed 1,200 people in Gemünden.

On 1 July 1972, the Gemünden am Main district (Landkreis Gemünden am Main) was abolished. With the amalgamation of nine municipalities with 14 Ortsteile between 1971 and 1978, the municipal territory increased sevenfold.

== Arts and culture ==
=== Museums ===
Film-Photo-Ton (“Film-Photo-Sound”) Museum in the Huttenschloss in Gemünden

=== Regular events ===
There are the Scherenburgfestspiele (festival) in July and August in the inner courtyard at the Scherenburg ruins. This is run by Festspielverein der Stadt Gemünden e.V..

Heimatfest is a local festival held every year on the fairgrounds on the opposite side of the Franconian Saale from the town's pedestrian precinct. It is always held during the summer months (usually either in June or July). It is very much a scaled-down version of the Oktoberfest (held at the end of September every year in Munich) with a beer tent, rides, and games. It is always one week in length (from Saturday to the following Sunday) concluding in a fireworks display from the Scherenburg castle ruins.

Gemünden was well known as the venue for the heavy metal festival "Up From The Ground". However, the festival was last held in 2007, and owing to a number of factors, including fears for safety and poor service access at the venue, the promoters have no plans to continue the festival in Gemünden.

== Attractions ==
Over Gemünden's town centre rise the ruins of Scherenburg, a castle also known as Schloss Scherenberg, which once belonged to the Counts of Rieneck. Farther up the hill are found the ruins of the Slorburg, another castle.

The Elias Hügel Column from 1740 was built based on the design of the mostly destroyed original in Kaisersteinbruch. The master mason was Friedrich Opferkuh and the sculptor was Ferenc Gyurcsek. It also stands as a token of good collaboration between the Gemünden am Main Historical Society and the Kaisersteinbruch Museum and Cultural Club.

A plaque recalls the old synagogue that was heavily damaged on Kristallnacht (9 November 1938) and torn down in 1945. A memorial to those Soviet prisoners who lost their lives during forced labour, can be found in the direction of Rieneck. There is also a war cemetery, inaugurated in 1957.

At the far south of the municipal territory is the Ruine Schönrain, the ruins of a former priory and castle. Beneath the ruins, the Schönraintunnel railway tunnel enters the hill.

== Sports ==
- WWC White Water Company Gemünden am Main e.V.: canoe sport club with focus on whitewater canoeing and recreational sport
- FV Gemünden/Seifriedsburg: football club

== Governance ==
=== Town twinning ===
- Duiven, Gelderland, Netherlands
- Nals, South Tyrol, Italy
- (Germany) Zella-Mehlis, Thuringia

=== Coat of arms ===
The town's arms might be described thus: Azure a castle argent with wall embattled flanked by towers, rising behind the wall a greater tower, itself with two flanking turrets braced underneath against the tower, in the wall a gate Or, the leaves open showing a portcullis raised of the same, the opening sable, all tower and turret roofs and tops of merlons gules, all roofs conical, and on top of each a roundle of the third.

== Infrastructure ==
=== Transport ===
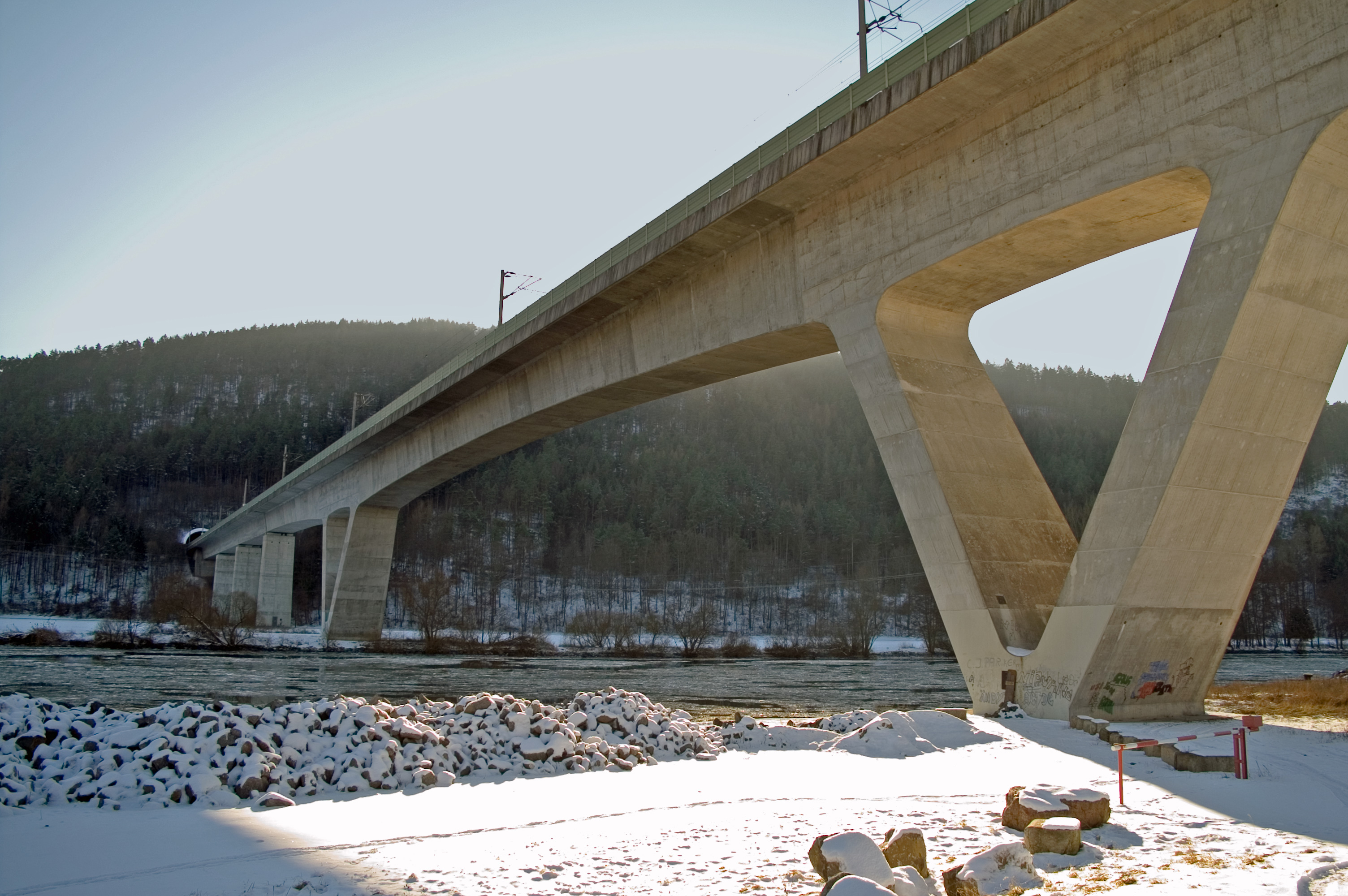
Main valley bridge on the newly built line

Gemünden station is an important railway junction. The North-South railway from Fulda to Würzburg forms a junction here with the east–west line from Aschaffenburg to Würzburg. West of town, the newly built Hanover–Würzburg high-speed railway crosses the Main on the Gemünden Main Valley Bridge. Furthermore, the Franconian Saale Valley Railway (Fränkische Saaletalbahn) branches off at Gemünden, running to the spa town of Bad Kissingen. Gemünden is an important goods handling hub, and also running here are the Deutsche Bahn's Regionalbahn trains linking Gemünden with Würzburg and Aschaffenburg.

Gemünden lies on Bundesstraße 26.

== Notable people ==
- Johann Gallus Hügel (b. 2 December 1664; d. 14 September 1719), master stonemason
- Elias Hügel (b. 17 June 1681; d. 22 August 1755), Imperial Baroque court master stonemason and churchbuilder
- Euchar Albrecht Schmid (b. 29 August 1884; d. 15 July 1951 in Bad Liebenstein), German jurist, writer and publisher, cofounder and managing director of the Karl-May-Verlag (publishing house).
- Olga Knoblach-Wolff (b. 9 June 1923; d. 11 July 2008), painter
- Anneliese Lussert (b. 1929, d. 2006), writer
- Hans Michelbach (b. 1949), CSU politician
- Andreas Kümmert (b. 1986), German singer, selected Eurovision participant, but turned down the offer.
