= Franconian Saale =

River in Germany

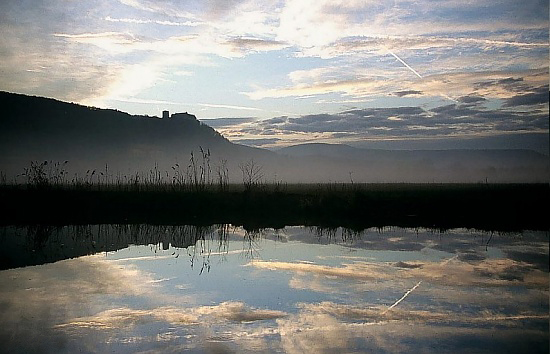
- The Franconian Saale near Hammelburg

Location
- Country: Germany
- State: Bavaria
- District: Lower Franconia
- Reference no.: DE: 244

Physical characteristics
- Source
  - location: in the Grabfeld region near Bad Königshofen
  - coordinates: 50°17′57″N 10°35′40″E
  - elevation: 313 m above sea level (NN)
- Mouth
  - location: near Gemünden into the Main
  - coordinates: 50°03′21″N 9°41′06″E
  - elevation: 211 m (692 ft)
- Length: 140.0 km (87.0 mi)
- Basin size: 2,764.82 km^{2} (1,067.50 sq mi)
- Discharge
  - location: Wolfsmünster Gauge
  - average: 16.6 m^{3}/s (590 cu ft/s)
  - minimum: Average low: 4.14 m^{3}/s (146 cu ft/s)
  - maximum: Average high: 137 m^{3}/s (4,800 cu ft/s)

Basin features
- Progression: Main→ Rhine→ North Sea
- Landmarks: Large towns: Bad Kissingen; Small towns: Bad Königshofen, Bad Neustadt, Hammelburg, Gemünden
- Tributaries
  - left: Barget, Lauer
  - right: Krummengraben, Milz, Streu, Brend, Kellersbach, Aschach, Thulba, Schondra, Sinn
- Bridges: Saale Valley Bridge at Hollstadt

The Franconian Saale (German: Fränkische Saale, pronounced [ˈfʁɛŋkɪʃə ˈzaːlə]) is a 140 km long river in Bavaria, Germany. It is a right-bank tributary of the Main, in Lower Franconia. It should not be confused with the larger Saxon Saale (German: Sächsische Saale), which is a tributary of the Elbe River.

The Franconian Saale flows through Bad Königshofen, Bad Neustadt, Bad Kissingen, Hammelburg and flows into the Main River in Gemünden am Main.

== Course ==
=== Headwaters ===
The Franconian Saale begins in the region of Grabfeld east and southeast of Bad Königshofen at the confluence of two headstreams:

- The Saalbrunnen, its northern headstream, rises at the so-called "Source of the Franconian Saale" (Fränkische Saale Quelle), 1.7 km east of Alsleben (a district of Trappstadt) on the road to Gompertshausen below the 390-metre-high (1,280 ft) Kapellenberg at a height of 313 metres above sea level (NN). The first enclosed wellspring was made of sandstone in the 1940s, it was redesigned in 1973, but its present appearance dates to 1985. Since 1987, it has had a bronze plaque by the artist, Erich Husemann, affixed to it, explaining the significance of the Franconian Saale.
- The Salzloch, the southern headstream of the Franconian Saale, rises a few miles to the south near the mill of Heckenmühle at the "Source of the Saale" (Saale Quelle), which is found near Obereßfeld (part of the municipality of Sulzdorf an der Lederhecke). It is also known as the Saalegraben und Dagigbach and its confluence with the northern stream is near Bad Königshofen-Untereßfeld.

The names of the two headstream sources indicate that they both claim to be the source of the Franconian Saale itself.

=== Course and mouth ===
From the confluence of its headwaters, south-east of Bad Königshofen, the Franconian Saale flows in a broadly southwesterly direction along the southeastern edge of the Rhön Mountains in central Germany. It passes through Bad Neustadt, Bad Bocklet, Bad Kissingen, Hammelburg and Gräfendorf to Gemünden, where it joins the River Main from the northeast.

== Catchment area ==
The water catchment area of the Franconian Saale is 2,765 km^{2}. Its kilometrage is measured from its confluence with the Main (0.00 km on the Saale, 211.0 km on the Main) to its more distant source at Alsleben (135.0 km).

== Name ==
The Franconian Saale is mentioned for the first time in the year 777 under the names Salu and Sala in a register from the town of Fulda. These terms both have the general meaning of "flowing waters" and had already been documented by the Greek geographer, Strabo (ca. 63 b.c.–a.d. 23).

== Ecology ==
The Franconian Saale has been altered by man for centuries in order to farm the Saale valley more intensively. The river was straightened by cutting across its meanders. The width of the river has also been standardized for long sections. Riparian forests were cleared and its banks reinforced, water mills and small hydropower stations and weirs were built and former flood zones were built on.

All this has seriously affected the ecological function of the river. Embankments and dams change its flow rate and consistency (Durchgängigkeit), destroying the unity of the river and meadow and encouraging devastating flooding. For several years the water authority in Schweinfurt has instigated projects to try, at least in part, to return the Franconian Saale to its former ecological role by removing bank reinforcements, circumnavigating weirs and regenerating riparian woodland.

== Fauna ==
The Franconian Saale is a habitat for the European eel, Chub, Ide, Grayling, Brown trout, Stone Loach, Barbel Bitterling, Bream, Minnow, Perch, gudgeon, Dace, Pike, Ruffe, Bullhead, Nase, Roach, Rudd, Burbot and Carp, as well as the occasional Signal crayfish.

== Flooding ==
Towns and villages close to the Saale that are particularly affected by regular flooding are Bad Kissingen, Westheim, Diebach, Gräfendorf, Wolfsmünster and Gemünden, as the highwater marks on historic buildings show. Bad Kissingen rarely escapes several flooding each year. However, flood protection measures involving the construction of weirs and defensive barriers have been implemented in its historic town centre.

== Gauging stations ==
Gauging stations are located in Bad Kissingen (the Prinzregentenbau Gauge) and Wolfsmünster (Saale Bridge Gauge). The measurements are published by the Schweinfurt Water Authority (Wasserwirtschaftsamt Schweinfurt).

== Tributaries ==
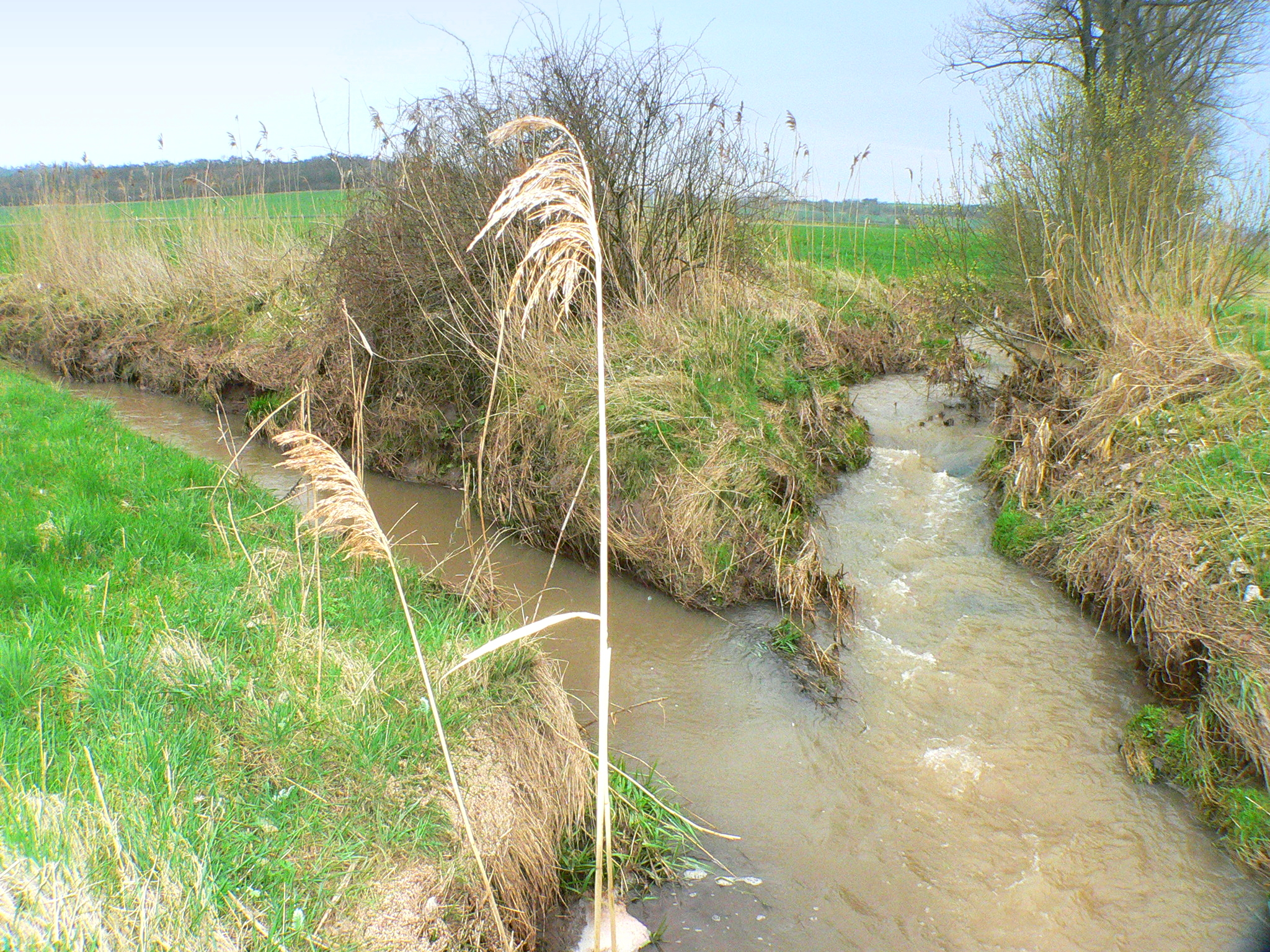
Confluence of the two headstreams near Untereßfeld

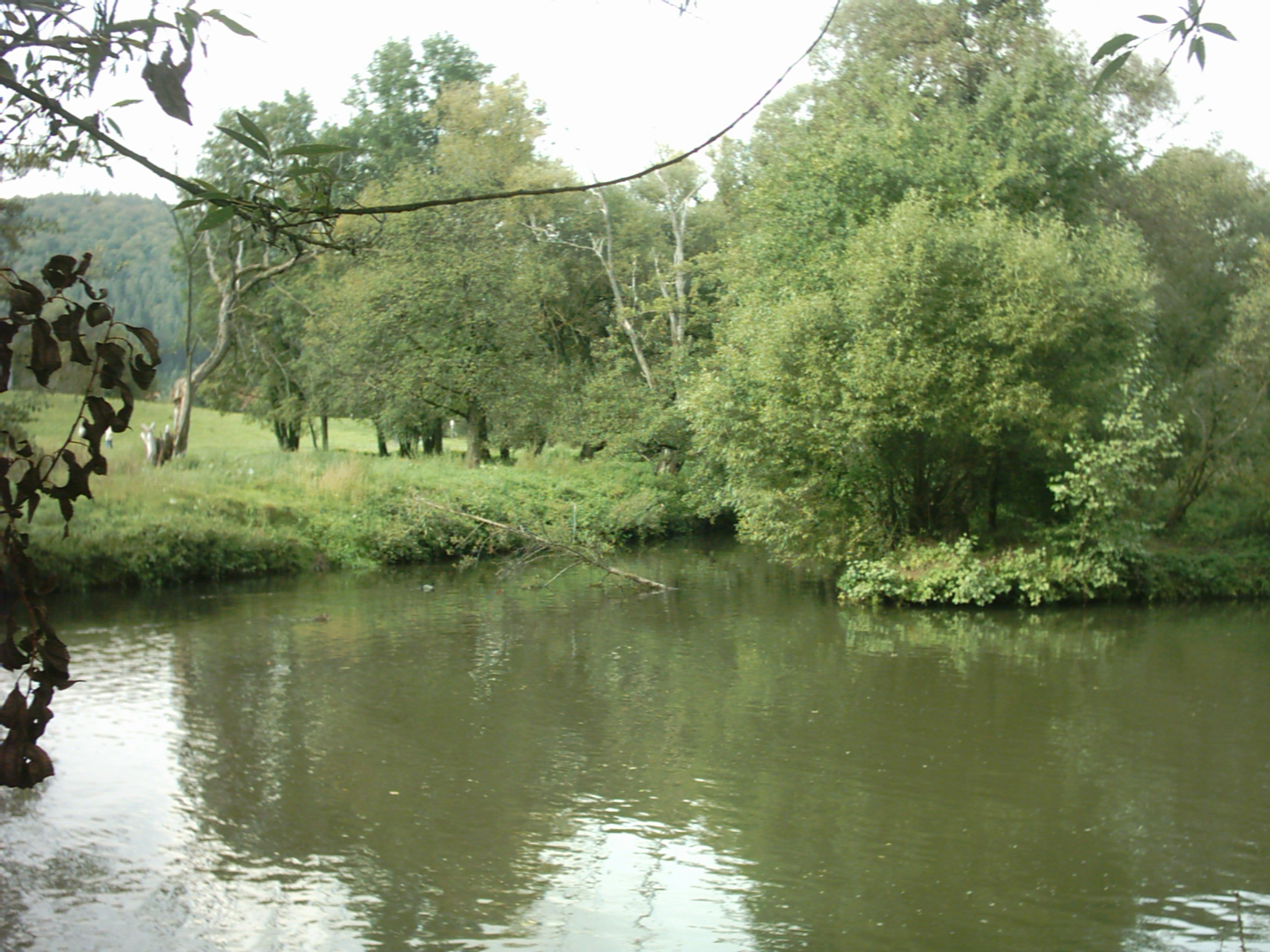
Mouth of the Sinn on the Franconian Saale

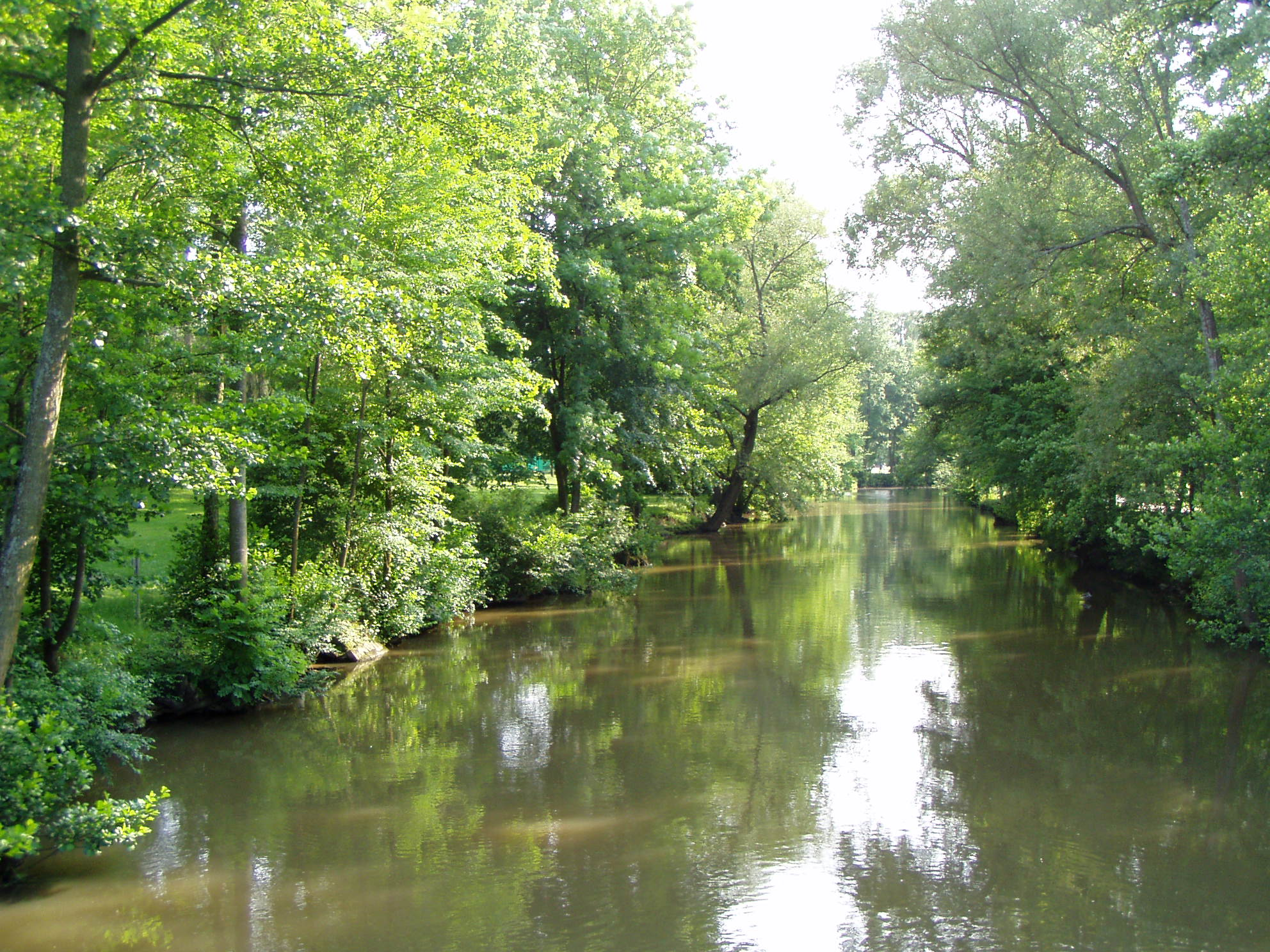
The Franconian Saale in Bad Kissingen (spa park)

After the confluence of the two headstreams the following tributaries flow into the Franconian Saale:

- The Krummengraben near Bad Königshofen (from the right)
- The Barget near Kleineibstadt (from the left)
- The Milz near Saal an der Saale (from the right)
- The Streu near Heustreu (from the right)
- The Brend in Bad Neustadt (from the right)
- The Lauer near Niederlauer (from the left)
- der Kellersbach between Steinach and Roth an der Saale (from the right)
- The Aschach near Aschach (from the right)
- The Thulba near Hammelburg (from the right)
- The Schondra in Gräfendorf (from the right)
- The Sinn in Gemünden (from the right)

A comprehensive list including the smaller tributaries is in the List of tributaries of the Franconian Saale (German).

== Municipalities on the Franconian Saale ==
The Franconian Saale flow through or past the following municipalities:

- Aura an der Saale
- Bad Bocklet
- Bad Kissingen
- Bad Königshofen
- Bad Neustadt an der Saale
- Elfershausen
- Euerdorf
- Gräfendorf
- Gemünden am Main
- Großeibstadt
- Hammelburg
- Hollstadt
- Kleineibstadt
- Niederlauer
- Saal an der Saale
- Trimberg
- Wülfershausen an der Saale

== Castles in the Saale valley ==
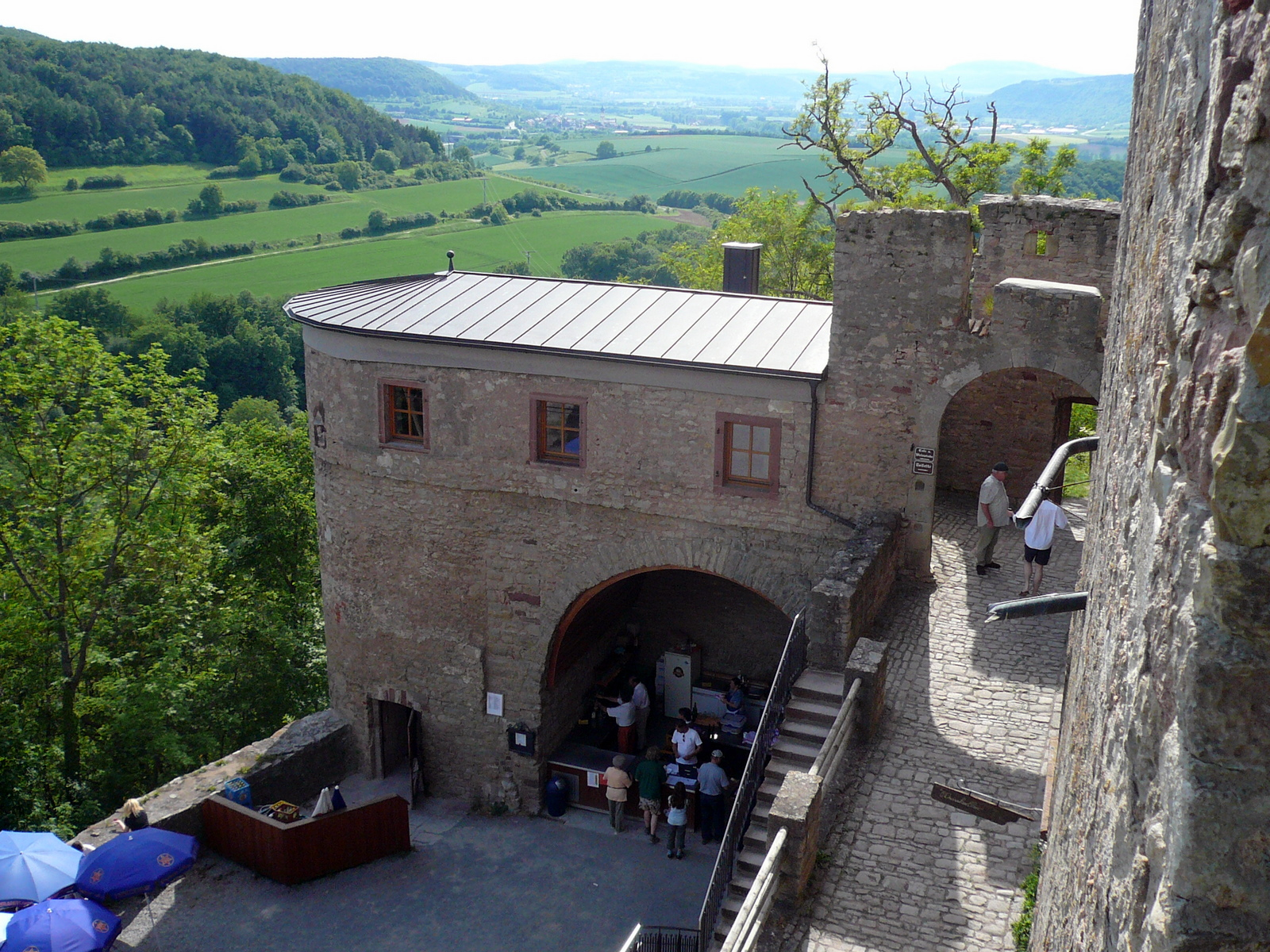
View over the Trimburg into the Saale valley

There are several picturesque castles in the Saale valley:

- The Salzburg near Bad Neustadt
- The ruins of Steineck Castle near Roth an der Saale
- AschachCastle in Aschach
- Ruins of Botenlauben Castle near Bad Kissingen
- Eiringsburg near Bad Kissingen
- The ruins of Aura Castle above Aura an der Saale
- The Trimburg above Trimberg
- The Red Castle in Hammelburg
- Saaleck Castle above Hammelburg
- ArnsteinCastle near Morlesau
- KiliansteinCastle auf dem Sodenberg
- Thüngensch Castle in Wolfsmünster
- The Scherenburg in Gemünden

== Bridges over the Saale ==
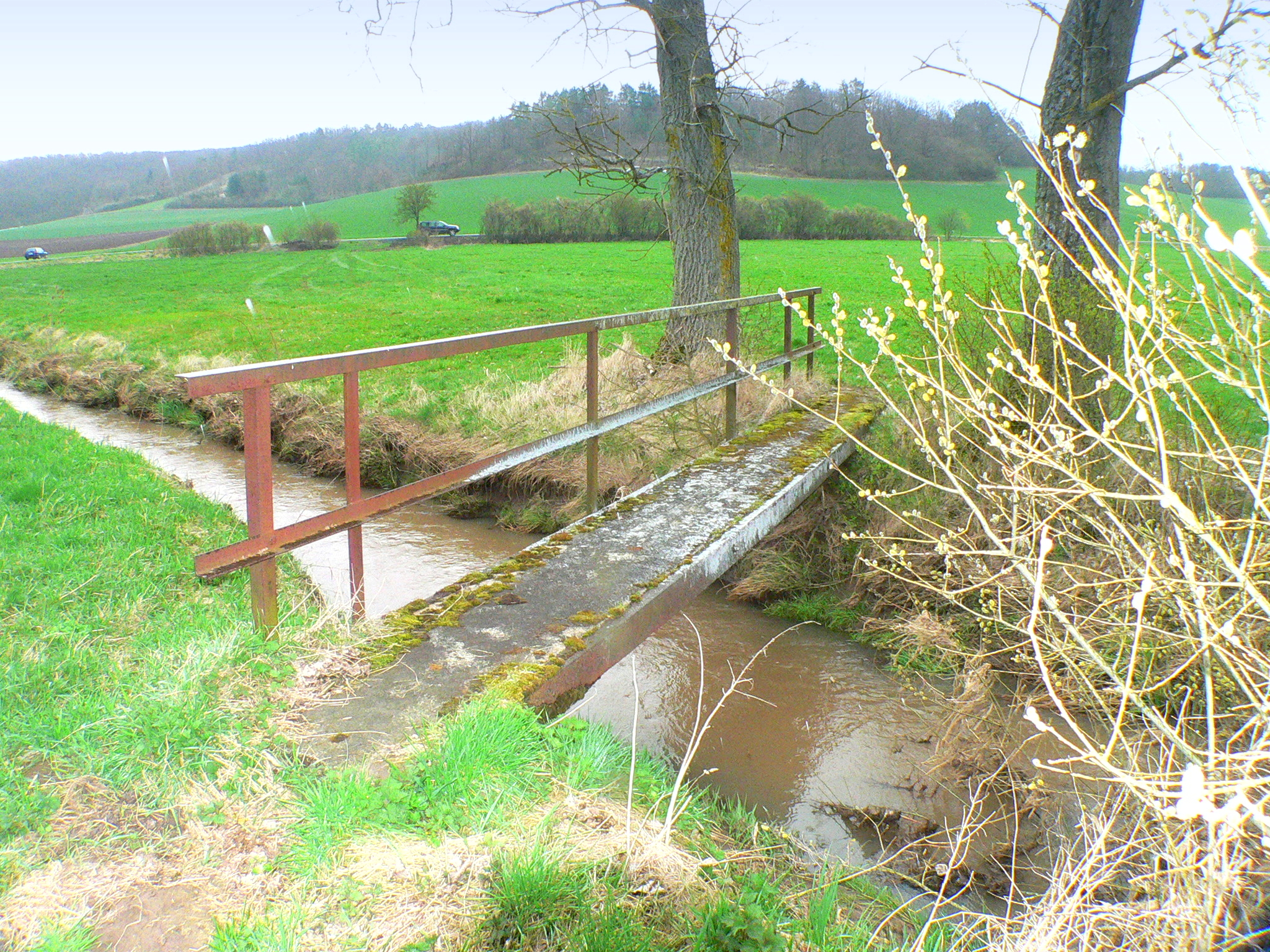
Footbridge over the upper Saale near Untereßfeld

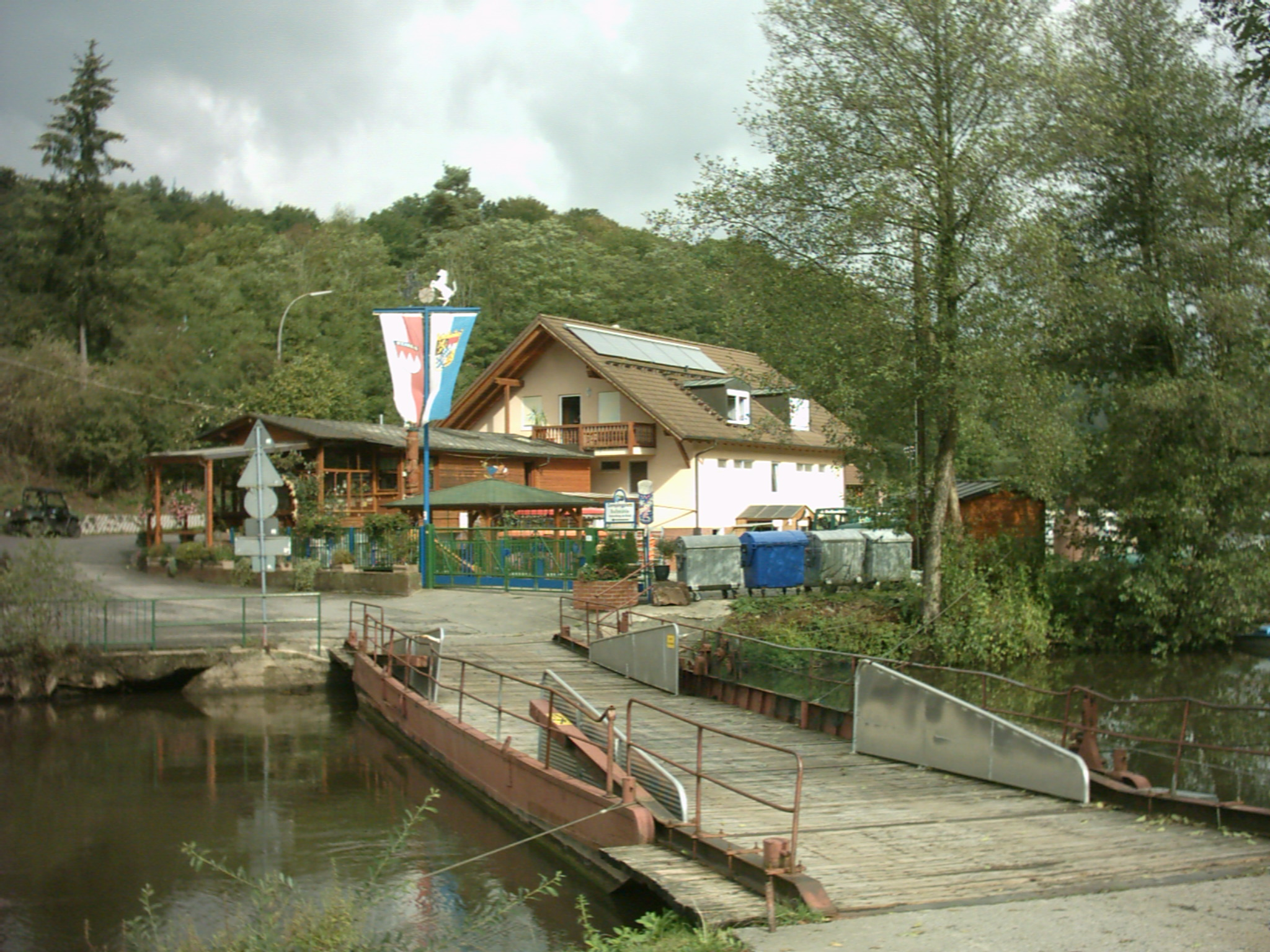
Pontoon bridge over the Franconian Saale (Roßmühle)

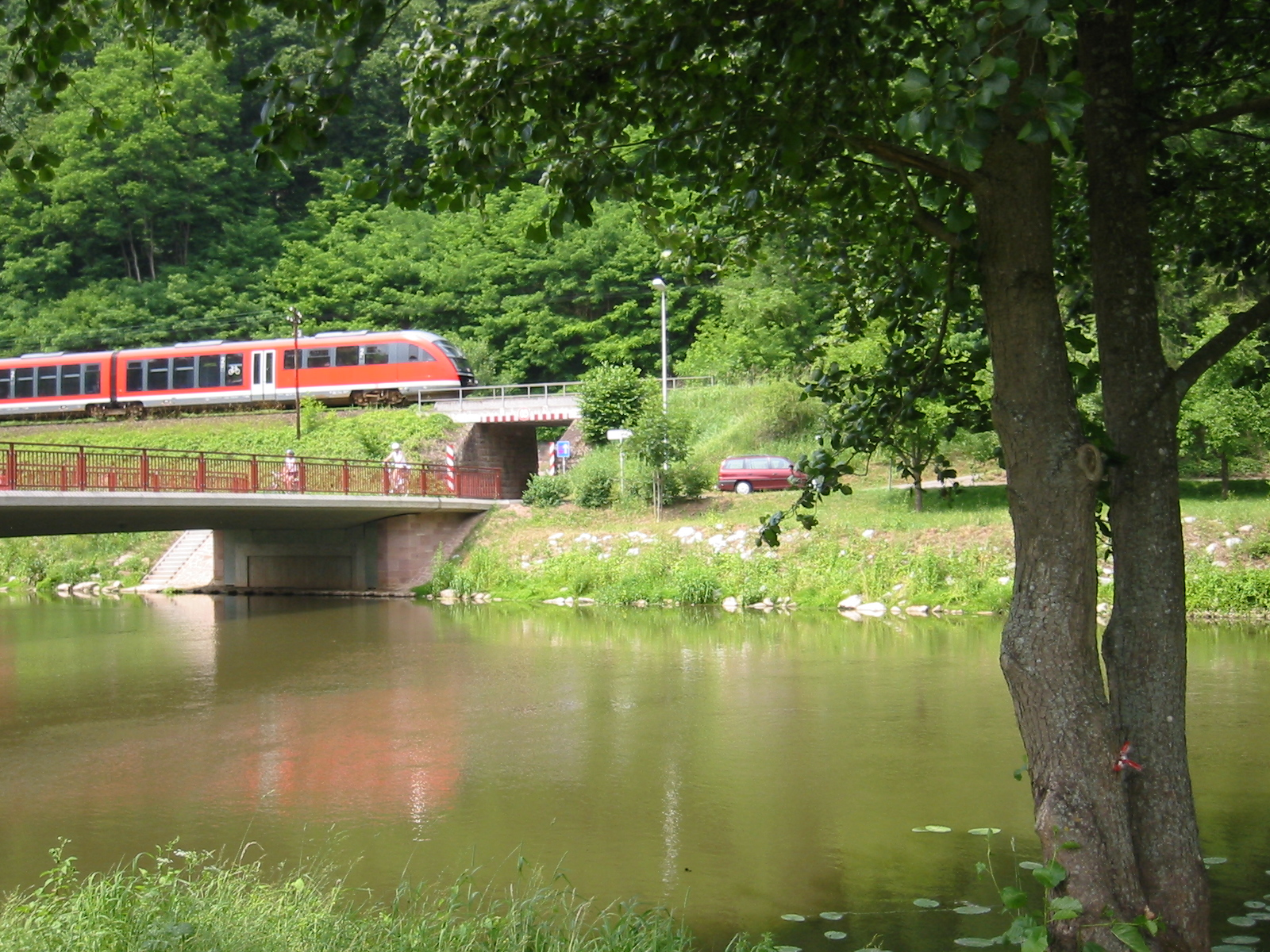
Saale bridge near Michelau

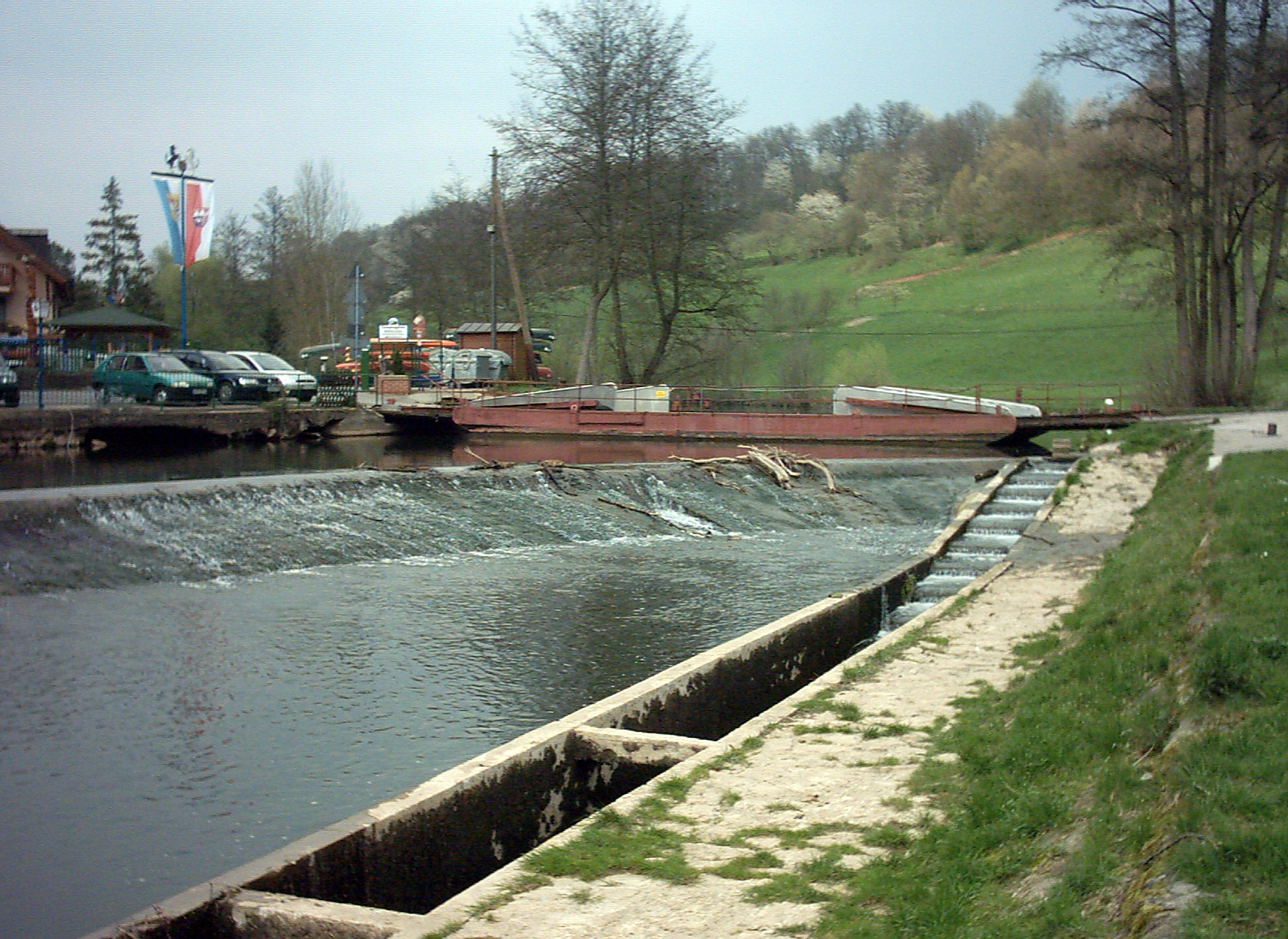
Weir and fish ladder by the Roßmühle mill

Important crossings include:

- B 279 road bridge in Bad Königshofen
- A 71 motorway bridge at km post 108.3 near Hollstadt
- B 279 road bridge at km post 108.0 near Hollstadt
- Schweinfurt – Schmalkalden main line railway bridge at km post 99.8
- B 19 road bridge at km post 96.5 near Bad Neustadt
- Bad Kissingen road bridge at km post 60.4
- Two road bridges at km post 51.5 near Euerdorf
- Road bridge at km post 48.0 in Aura linking Groß- and Klein-Aura
- Saale Valley Railway bridge at km post 44.2 near Trimberg
- Road bridge at km post 41.5 at the edge of Elfershausen
- A 7 Kassel-Würzburg motorway bridge at km post 41.0
- B 287 road bridge at km post 32.8 in Hammelburg-Fuchsstadt
- Hammelburg ring road bridge at km post 29.8
- Road bridge at km post 26.4 in Hammelburg
- Road bridge at km post 20.0 in Morlesau
- Roßmühle pontoon bridge at km post 17.1 near Weikersgrüben
- Road bridge at km post 15.0 in Michelau
- Road bridge at km post 9.8 near Schonderfeld
- Historic road bridge at km post 7.9 in Wolfsmünster
- Footbridge at km post 4.0 near Schönau Abbey
- Two road bridges at km post 0.6 in Gemünden
- Main-Spessart Railway (Würzburg-Frankfurt am Main) bridge at km post 0.1 in Gemünden

== Weirs ==
There are numerous weirs on the Franconian Saale, originally built in order to drive water mills, but today some are used to generate electricity. All weirs are equipped with fish ladders:

- Weir at km post 58.5 near Bad Kissingen
- Weir at km post 50.5 Karwinkelsmühle
- Two weirs at km post 48.0 near Aura
- Weir at km post 43.8 near Trimberg
- Saalemühle mill weir at km post 41.9 near Elfershausen
- Weir at km post 38.5 near Langendorf
- Weir at km post 37.7 near Westheim
- Fuchsstätter Mühlen mill weir at km post 36.8
- Hammelburg Herrenmühle mill weir at km post 29.1
- Weir at the old power station for Altstadt Abbey (Hammelburg) at km post 28.1
- Saaleck Castle weir at km post 27.6
- Rödermühle mill weir km post 24.1
- Weir at km post 22.5 Neumühle power station
- at km post 17.0 Weir Roßmühle power station
- Weir at km post 7.7 Wolfsmünster
- Schönau Abbey weir at km post 4.0
- Weir at km post 1.5 Gemünden (ruined)

== Boating ==
In spite of the many weirs the Franconian Saale is popular with canoeists as a slowly flowing river route. The river may be canoed from Bad Neustadt to Gemünden with a few restrictions. Boats may have up to four seats, be no longer than 6.00 metres and no wider than 1.10 metres. Rafting and the coupling of boats is not permitted.

== The Saale Valley Railway ==
The railway line from Bad Kissingen to Gemünden via Hammelburg and Gräfendorf known as the Saale Valley Railway runs along the lower course of the Franconian Saale. Until 1997 the Grabfeld Railway ran along its upper reaches linking Bad Neustadt and Bad Königshofen.

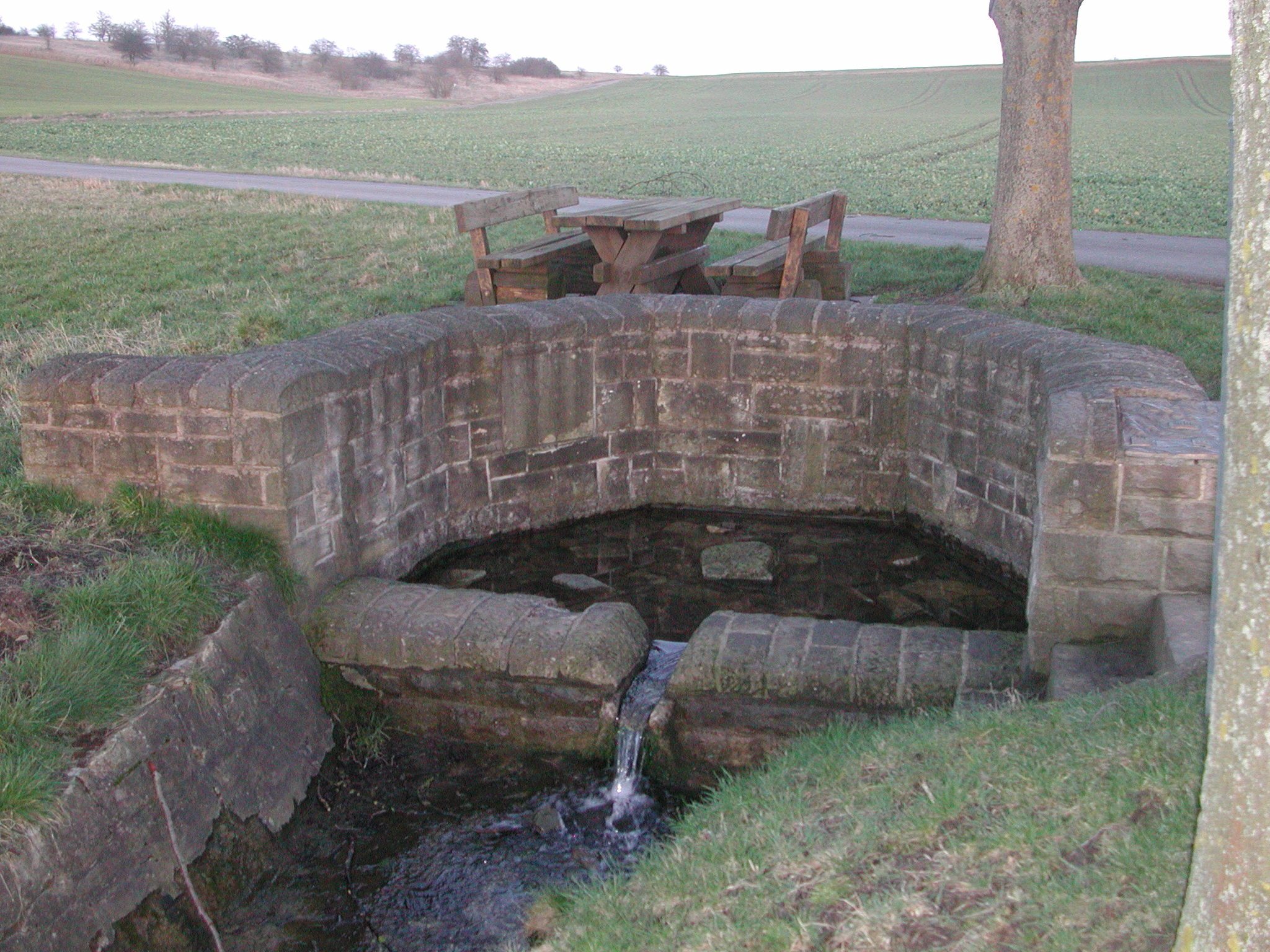
Fränkische Saalequelle near Alsleben

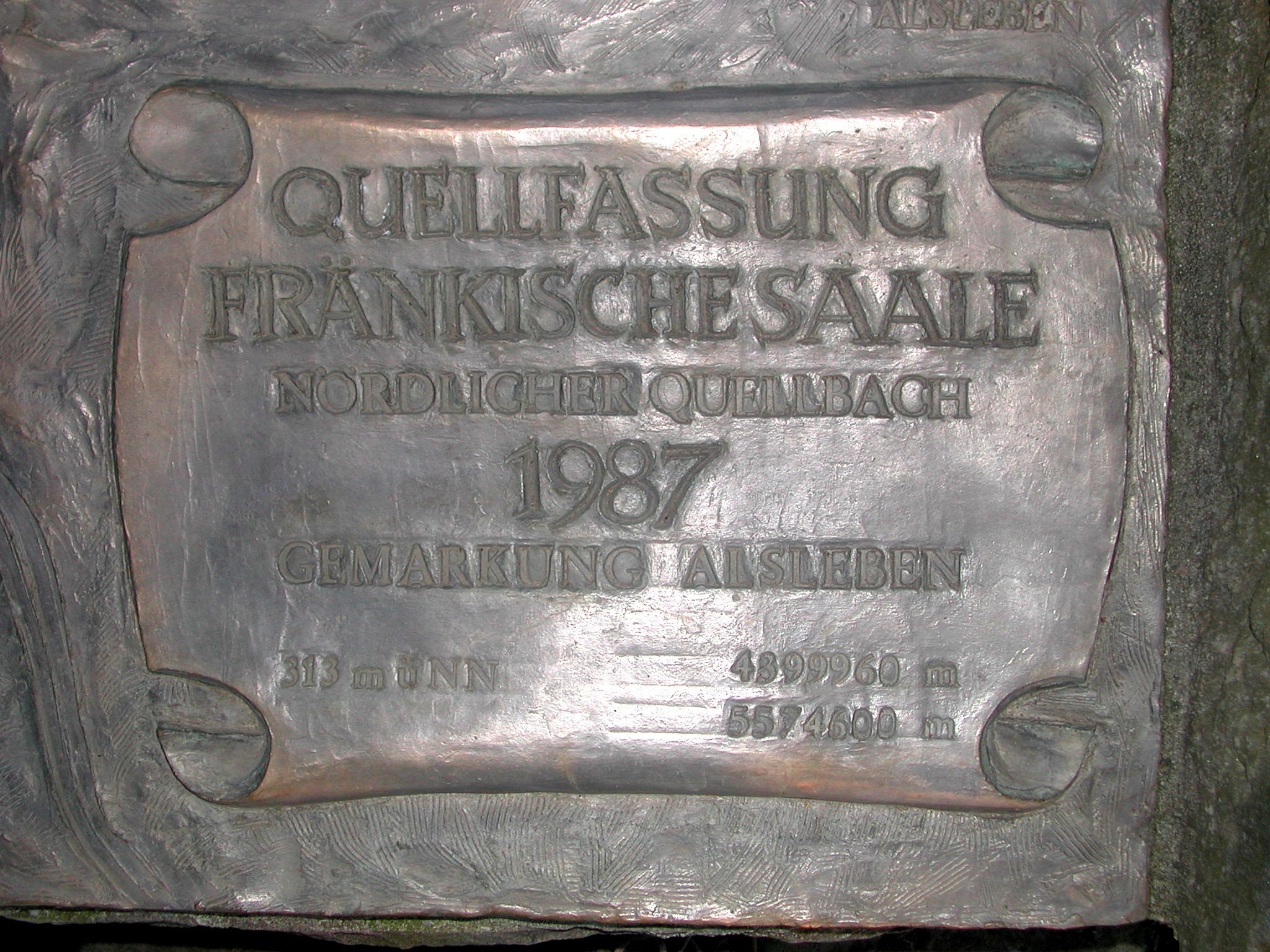
Bronze plaque at the Fränkische Saalequelle

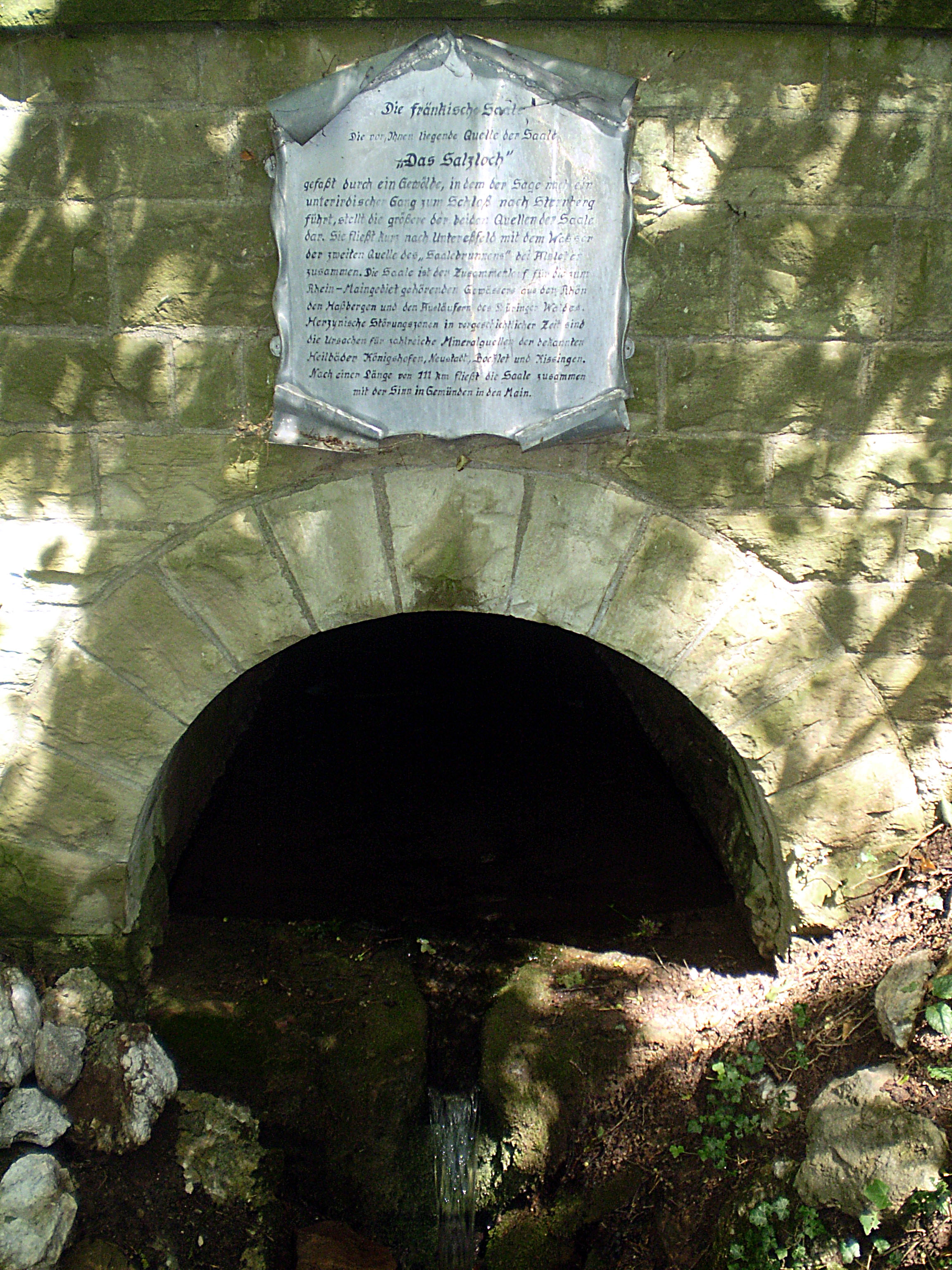
Saalequelle near Obereßfeld

== See also ==
- List of rivers of Bavaria
