= Lauer (river) =

River in Bavaria, Germany

- The Lauer in Poppenlauer

Location
- Country: Germany
- State: Bavaria

Physical characteristics
- Mouth
  - location: Franconian Saale
  - coordinates: 50.3002°N 10.1828°E
- Length: 33.2 km (20.6 mi)
- Basin size: 298 km^{2} (115 sq mi)

Basin features
- Progression: Franconian Saale→ Main→ Rhine→ North Sea

Lauer (German pronunciation: [ˈlaʊɐ]) is a river of Bavaria, Germany. It flows into the Franconian Saale in Niederlauer.

== See also ==
- List of rivers of Bavaria
