= Unsleben =

- Municipality
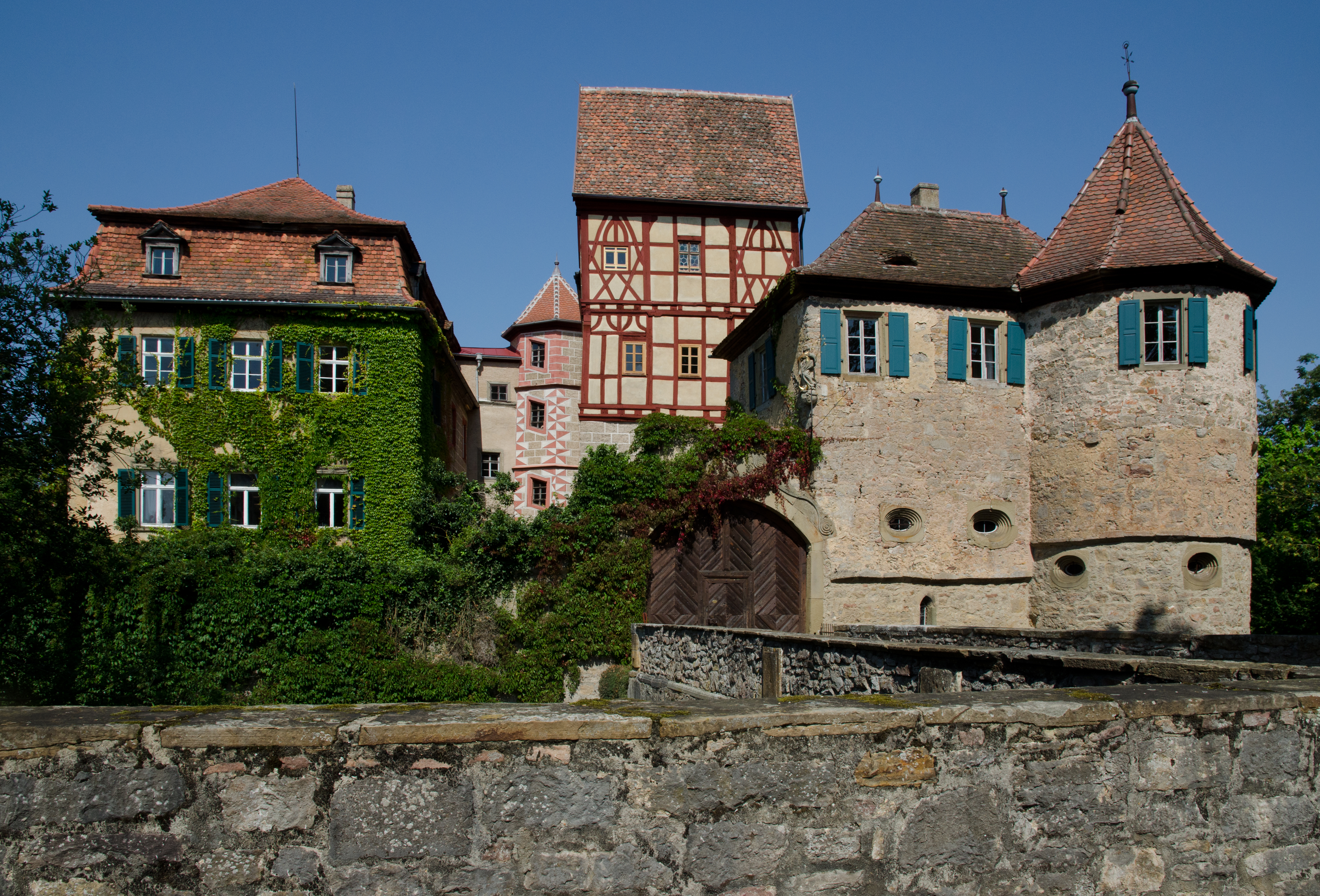
- Water Castle

- Coat of arms

- Location of Unsleben within Rhön-Grabfeld district
- Interactive map of Unsleben
- Location within Germany Location within Bavaria
- Coordinates: 50°23′N 10°16′E
- Country: Germany
- State: Bavaria
- Admin. region: Unterfranken
- District: Rhön-Grabfeld
- Municipal assoc.: Heustreu

Government
  - Mayor (2020–26): Michael Gottwald

Area
  - Total: 8.93 km^{2} (3.45 sq mi)
- Elevation: 248 m (814 ft)

Population (2025-12-31)
  - Total: 965
  - Density: 108/km^{2} (280/sq mi)
- Time zone: UTC+01:00 (CET)
  - Summer (DST): UTC+02:00 (CEST)
- Postal codes: 97618
- Dialling codes: 09773
- Vehicle registration: NES
- Website: www.unsleben.de

Unsleben is a municipality in the district of Rhön-Grabfeld in Bavaria in Germany.

== Geography ==
Unsleben is located in the Main-Rhön area. Near its south-east fringes, the brook Els flows into the stream Streu.

== History ==
Unsleben was mentioned in the documents first in 1162 as a habitation of a local noble family. The Bishopric of Würzburg shared its authority with the noblemen von Habermann until it was secularised in the year 1803 for the benefit of Bavaria. In 1805 the area was exchanged with Tyrol and was conclusively incorporated into Bavaria in the year 1814 together with the tenurial of the von Habermanns. The administrative reform in Bavaria led in 1818 to the contemporary municipality of Unsleben.

Among the tens of thousands of Central European German-speakers who came to America in the 1840s and 50s were 15 Jews from Unsleben who founded the Jewish community in Cleveland, Ohio.

During the time of Nazi Germany, the local Jewish families were prosecuted, forced to emigrate or murdered. Their synagogue, located near the Schlossgasse/Kemenate, was defiled during the November Pogroms of 1938. The building, nowadays "house of the countrywoman", has a commemorative plaque to remind its original purpose.

=== Development of population ===
- 1970: 1,016 residents
- 1987: 871 residents
- 2000: 950 residents
- 2011: 1,036 residents

== Politics ==
Mayor is Michael Gottwald (Bürgerforum). The municipal tax receipts were €459,000 (converted) in 1999, thereof the amount of €94,000 was local business tax.

== Business and infrastructure ==
As of 30 June 2010, according to the official statistics, 315 persons were employed in Unsleben, of which 139 in manufacturing, 111 in trade, transportation and hospitality industry, and 37 in public and private service providers. The largest operation at the site is the Nordbayerische Holzindustrie GmbH. 12 farms used an agricultural area of 628 hectares, of which 549 were arable land.

=== Education ===
- Kindergarten for 50 children and a kindergarten for children with special needs in Herbert-Meder-Schule
- Special school Herbert-Meder-Schule. The building of the local primary school was not in use since 14 March 2011, from September 13, 2012 it is used as an after-school care club run by Lebenshilfe Rhön-Grabfeld. Elementary school students of Unsleben go to Hollstadt or Wollbach.

== Buildings ==
An object of interest is the moated castle of Unsleben. Some rooms are used as holiday homes.

== Coat of arms ==
The Wasserschloss (water castle) Unsleben and the checker board of the family Truchseß von Unsleben coat of arms are represented. The Truchseß von Unsleben family shares the same coat of arms as the Truchseß von Wetzhausen family although they by written agreement consider themselves two distinct families.
