= Stockheim, Lower Franconia =

Stockheim
- Municipality
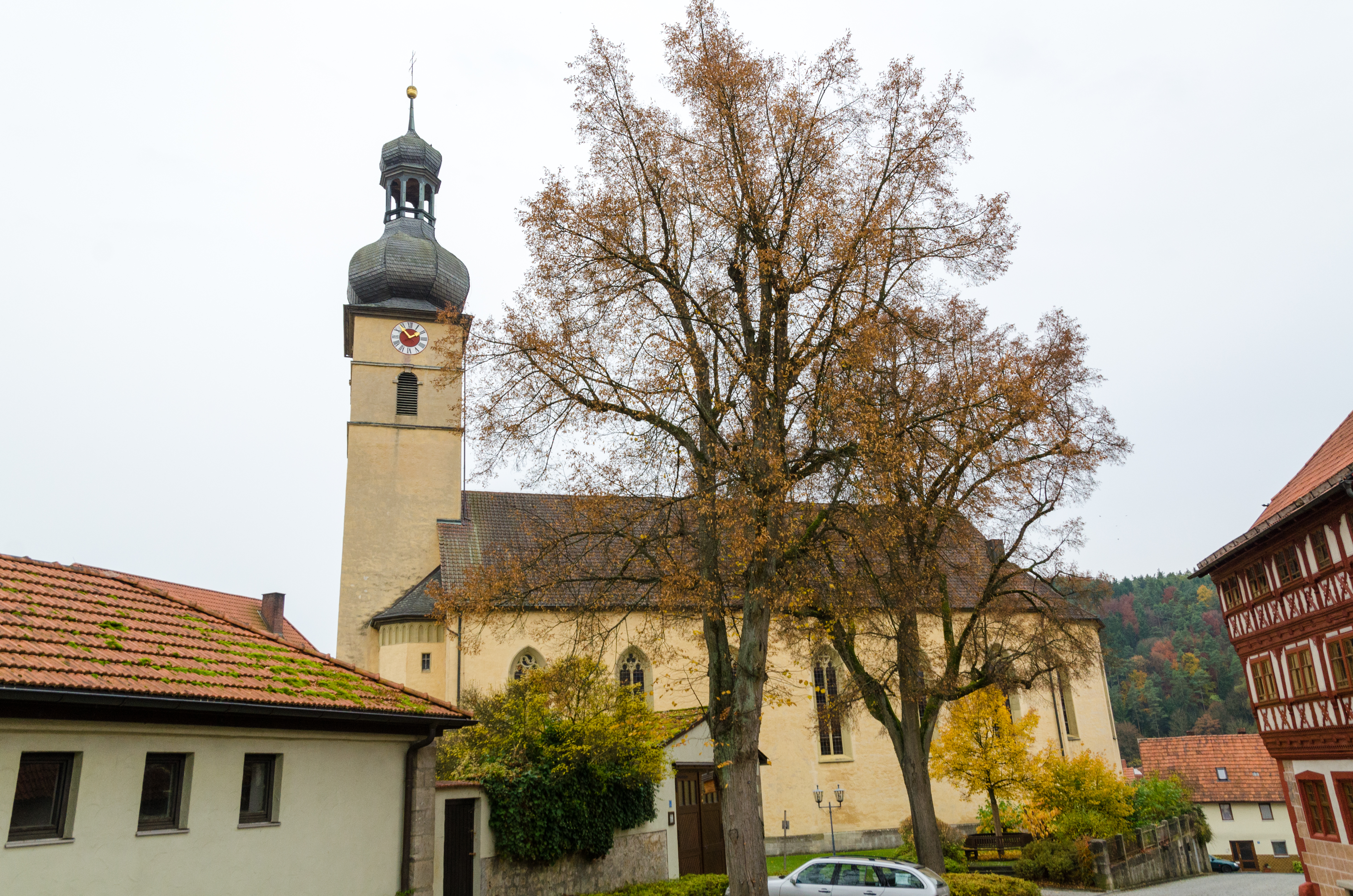
- Church of Saint Vitus

- Coat of arms

- Location of Stockheim within Rhön-Grabfeld district
- Interactive map of Stockheim
- Location within Germany Location within Bavaria
- Coordinates: 50°27′N 10°17′E
- Country: Germany
- State: Bavaria
- Admin. region: Unterfranken
- District: Rhön-Grabfeld
- Municipal assoc.: Mellrichstadt

Government
  - Mayor (2020–26): Martin Link

Area
  - Total: 19.86 km^{2} (7.67 sq mi)
- Elevation: 284 m (932 ft)

Population (2025-12-31)
  - Total: 1,029
  - Density: 51.81/km^{2} (134.2/sq mi)
- Time zone: UTC+01:00 (CET)
  - Summer (DST): UTC+02:00 (CEST)
- Postal codes: 97640
- Dialling codes: 09776
- Vehicle registration: NES
- Website: www.gemeinde-stockheim.de

Stockheim (German pronunciation: [ˈʃtɔkhaɪm]) is a municipality in the district of Rhön-Grabfeld in Bavaria in Germany. It is located in the Streu valley between Ostheim and Mellrichstadt.
