= Els (Streu) =

River in Germany

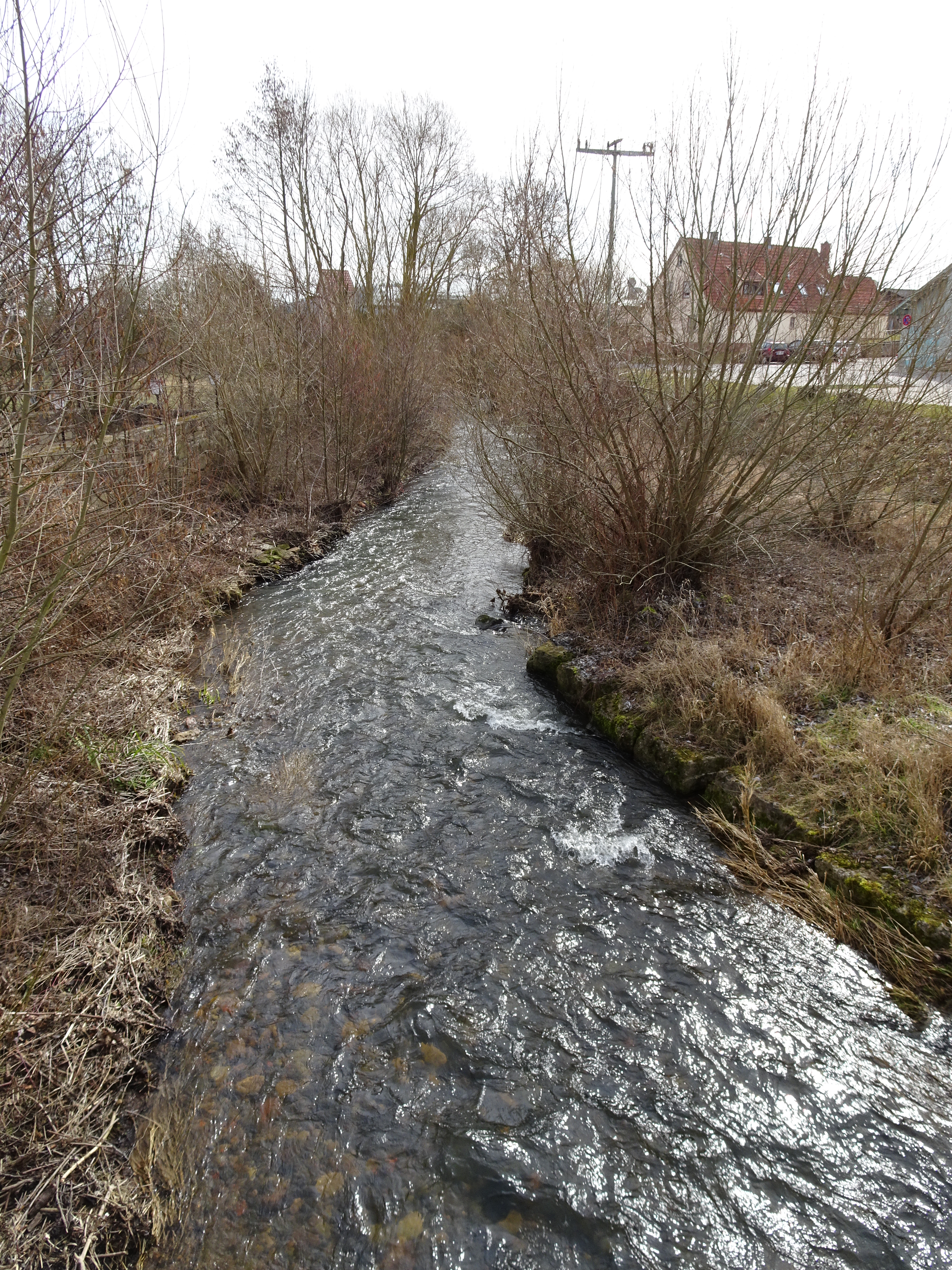
- The Els at Bastheim

Location
- Country: Germany
- State: Bavaria

Physical characteristics
- Mouth
  - location: Streu
  - coordinates: 50.3731°N 10.2610°E
- Length: 24.0 km (14.9 mi)

Basin features
- Progression: Streu→ Franconian Saale→ Main→ Rhine→ North Sea

Els, also called Elsbach, is a river in the Rhön Mountains, Lower Franconia, Bavaria, Germany. It is a tributary of the Streu in Unsleben.

== See also ==
- List of rivers of Bavaria
