= Paul Singer (politician) =

German Marxist politician

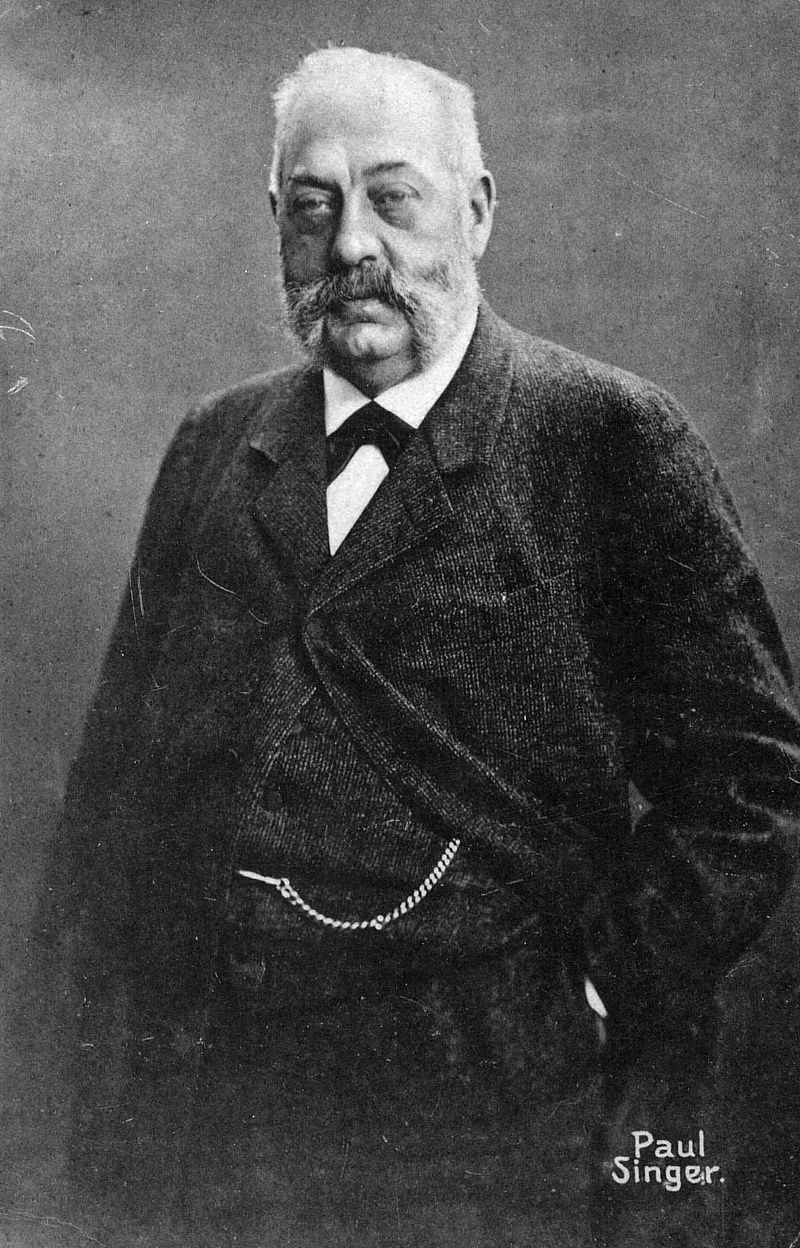
Singer c. 1905

Paul Singer (16 January 1844, Berlin – 31 January 1911) was a leading Marxist in and representative of the Social Democratic Party of Germany in the late 19th and early 20th centuries. Co-Chairmen of the SPD (which he joined in 1878) along with fellow Marxist August Bebel from 1890 until his death in 1911. His grave now forms part of the Memorial to the Socialists (German: Gedenkstätte der Sozialisten) in the Friedrichsfelde Central Cemetery, Berlin.

== Literature ==
- Heinrich Gemkow: Paul Singer – ein bedeutender Führer der deutschen Arbeiterbewegung. Dietz, Berlin 1957.
- Ursula Reuter: Paul Singer (1844–1911). Eine politische Biographie, Düsseldorf: Droste 2004
- Wilhelm Heinz Schröder: Sozialdemokratische Parlamentarier in den deutschen Reichs- und Landtagen 1867–1933. Biographien, Chronik und Wahldokumentation. Ein Handbuch. Düsseldorf, 1995. ISBN 3-7700-5192-0 S.706
