= Irmelshausen =

- Village of Höchheim
- Interactive map of Irmelshausen
- Location within Germany Location within Bavaria
- Coordinates: 50°21.75′N 10°28.15′E
- Country: Germany
- State: Bavaria
- Admin. region: Unterfranken
- District: Rhön-Grabfeld
- Municipality: Höchheim
- Elevation: 302 m (991 ft)
- Time zone: UTC+01:00 (CET)
  - Summer (DST): UTC+02:00 (CEST)
- Postal codes: 97633
- Dialling codes: 09764
- Vehicle registration: NES

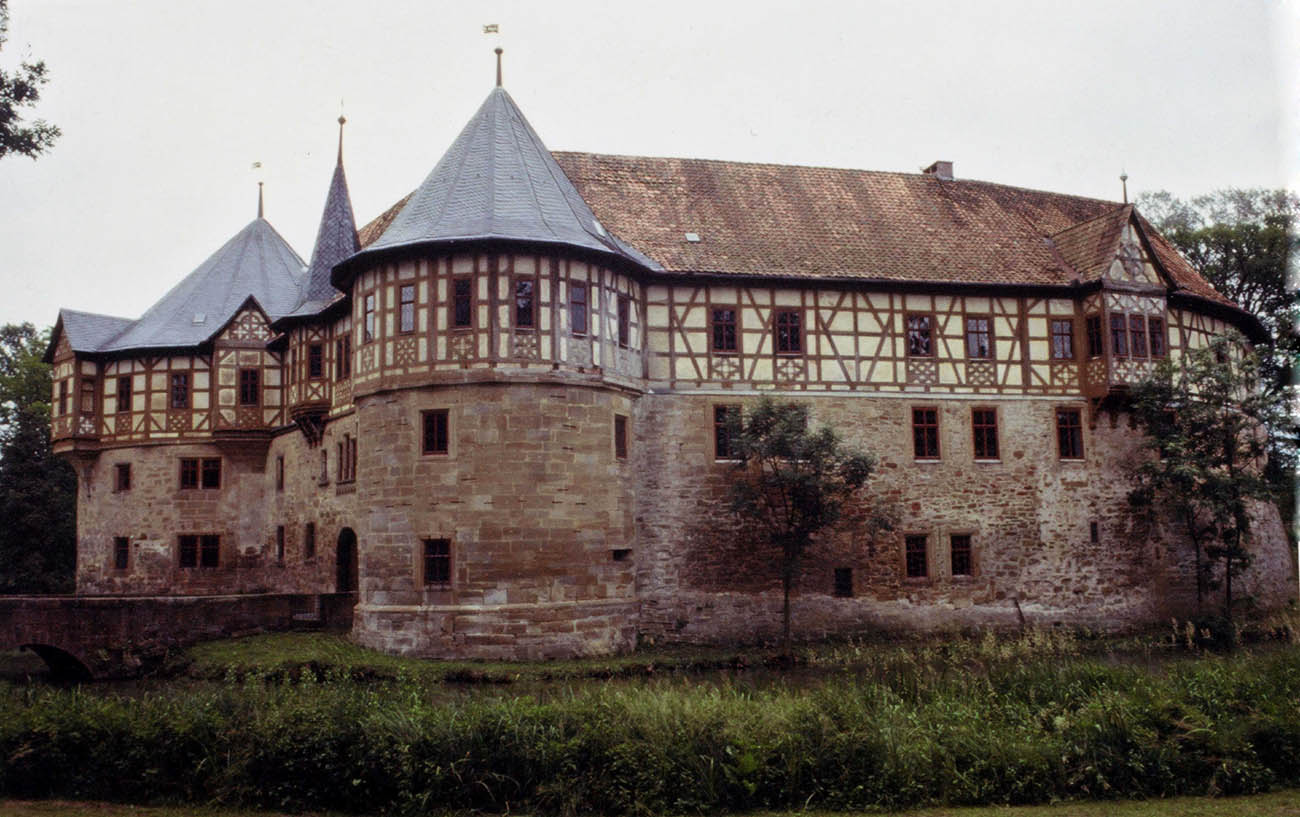
Irmelshausen from the west

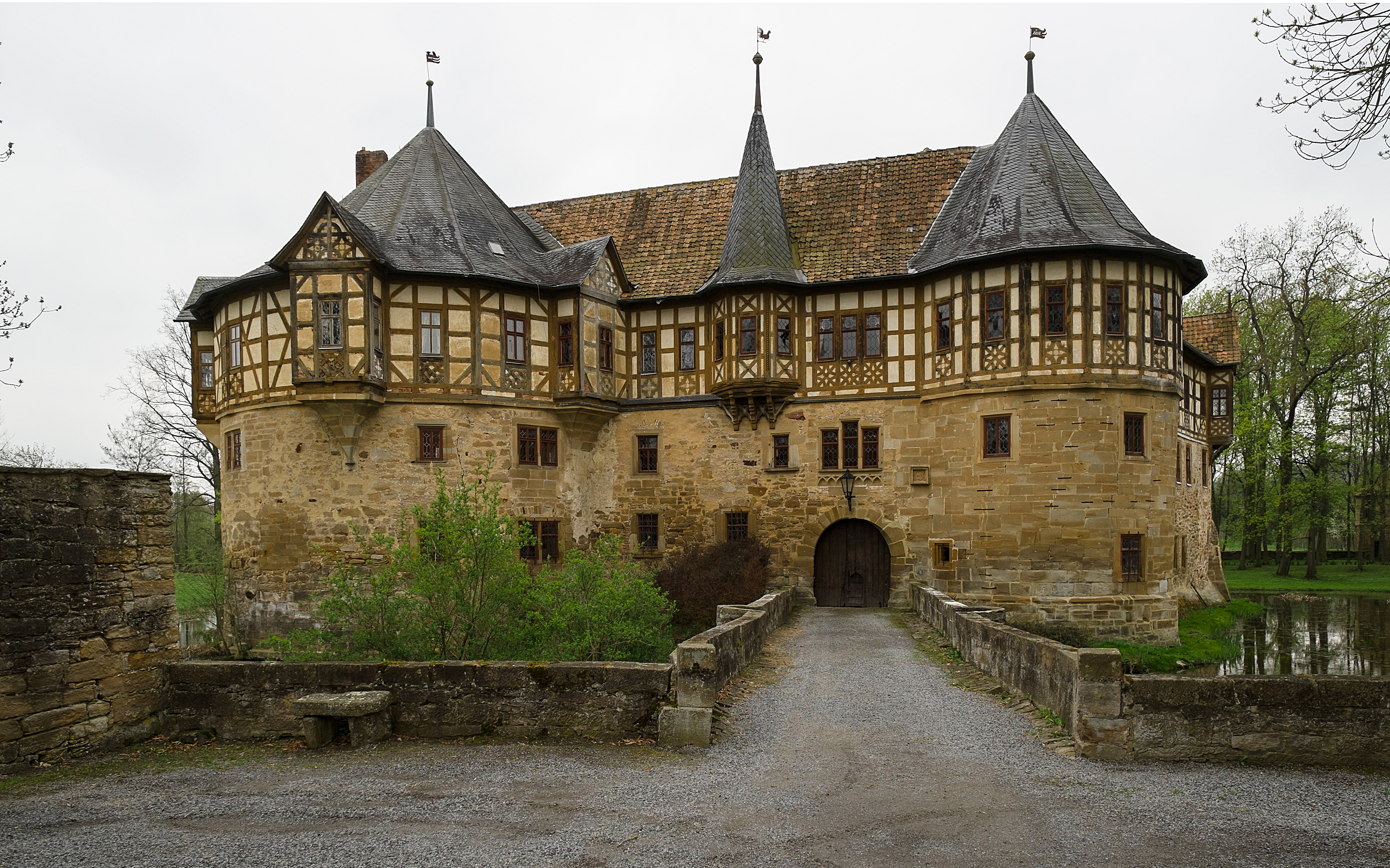
Irmelshausen from bridge

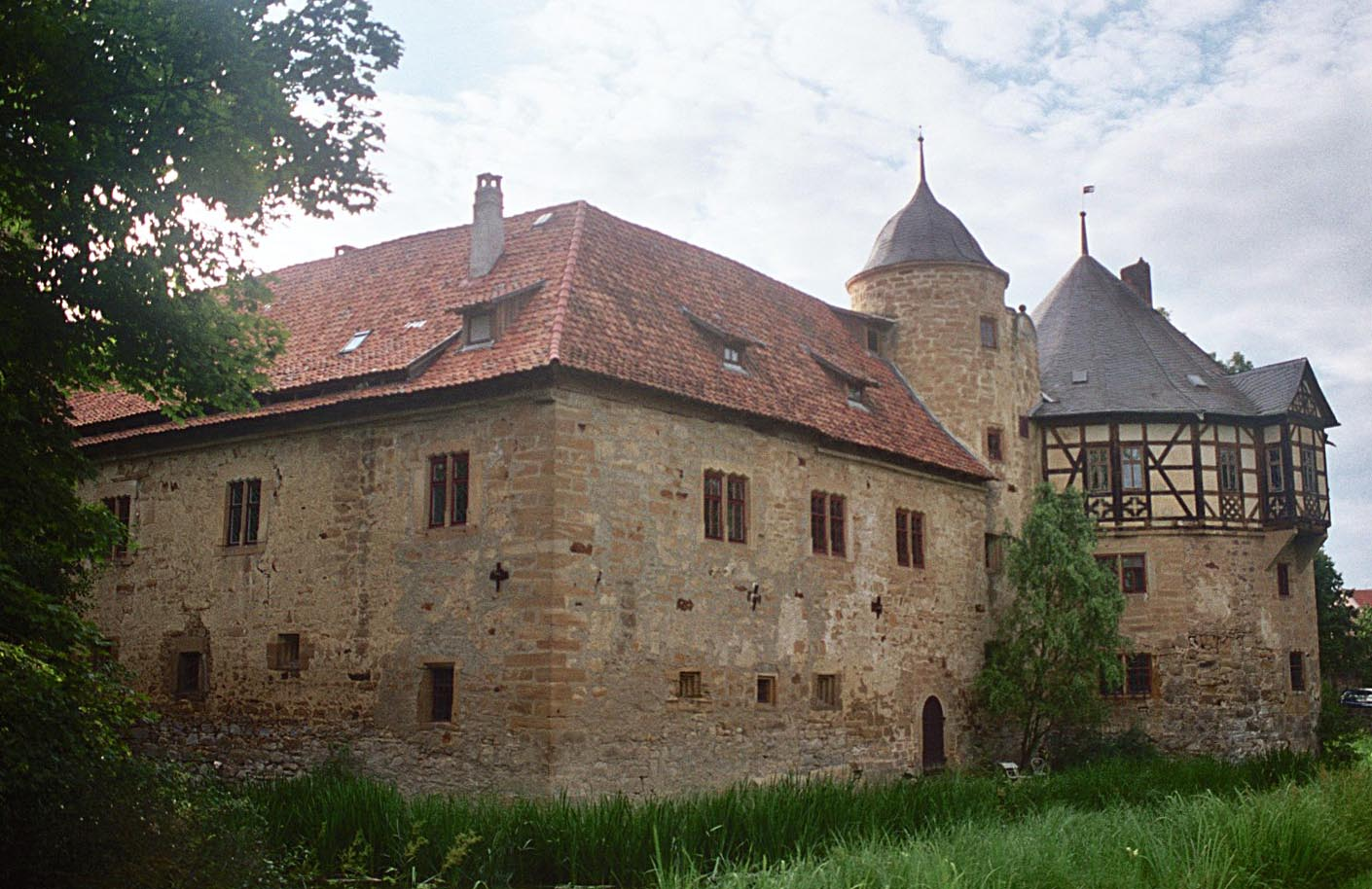
Irmelshausen from the north-east

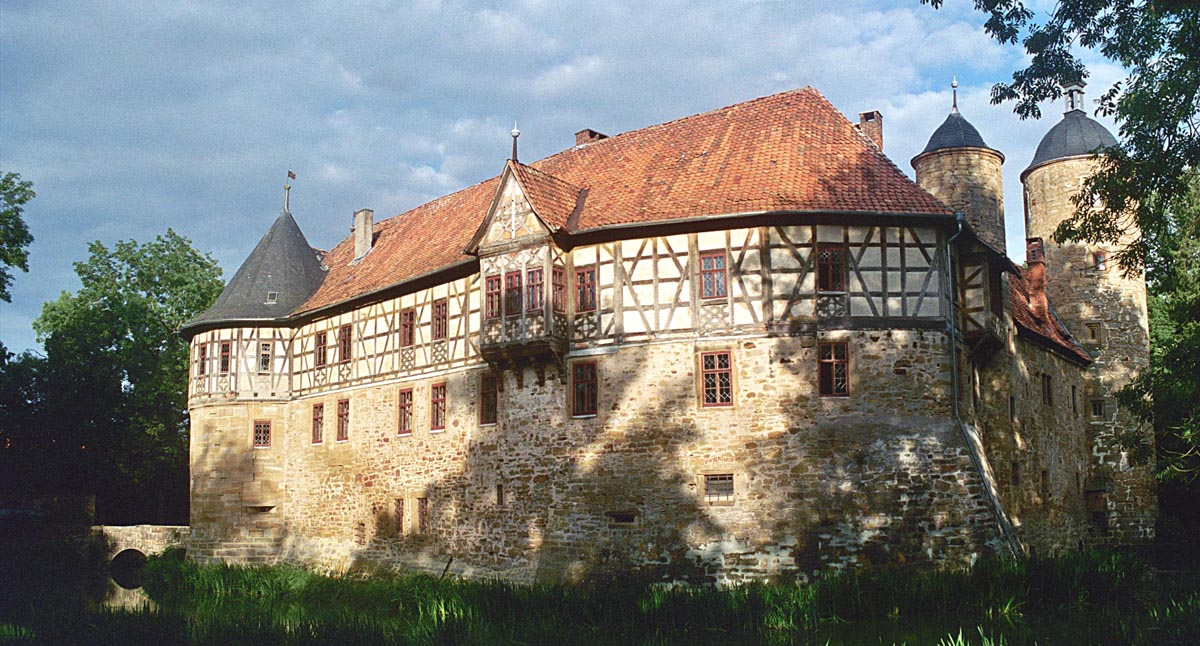
Irmelshausen from the south-west

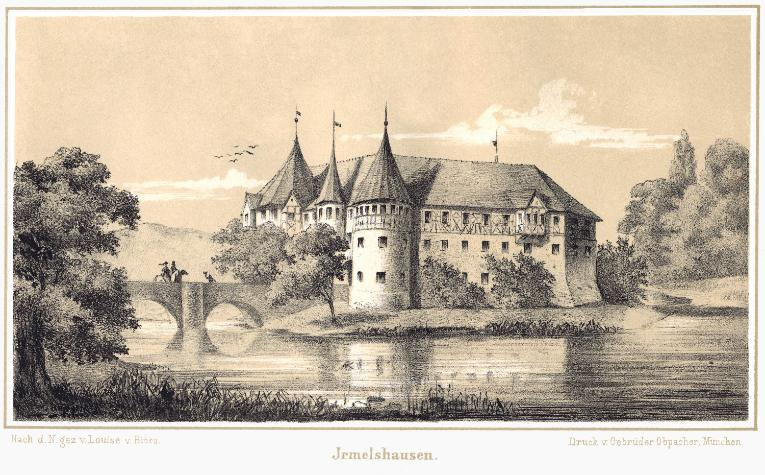
Irmelshausen Print

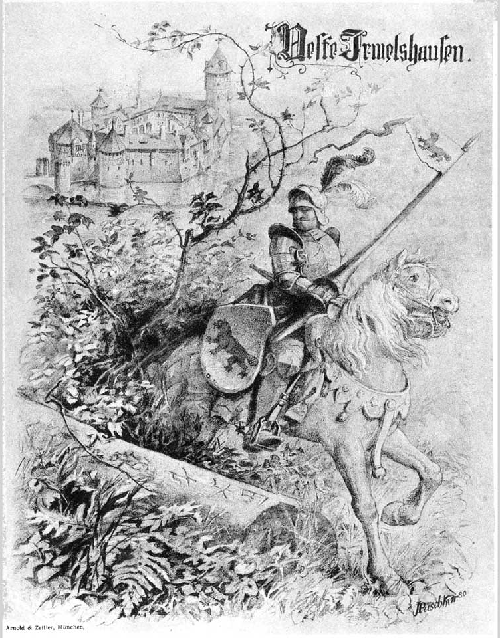

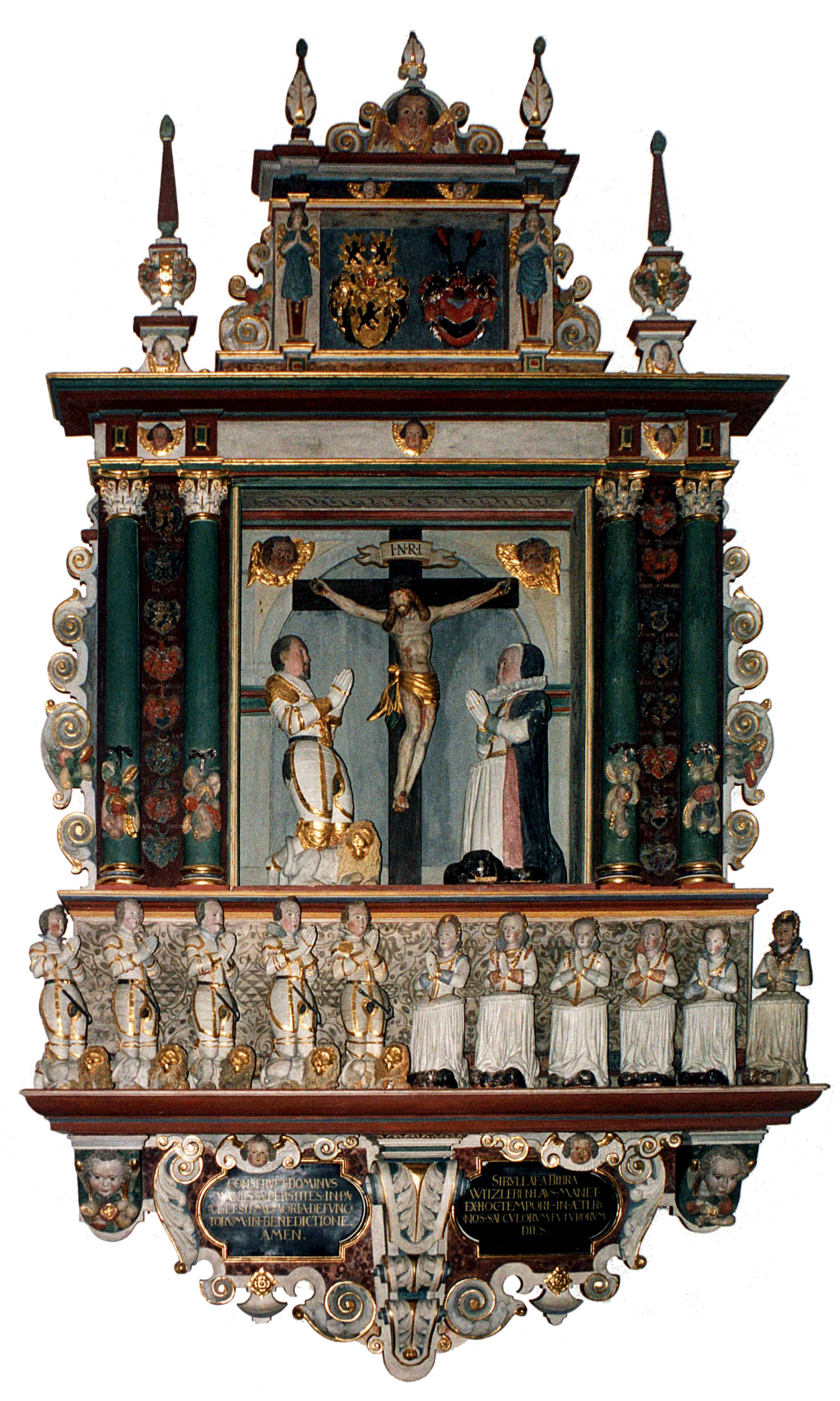
Epitaph of Bernhard and Sibylle von Bibra at Irmelshausen church

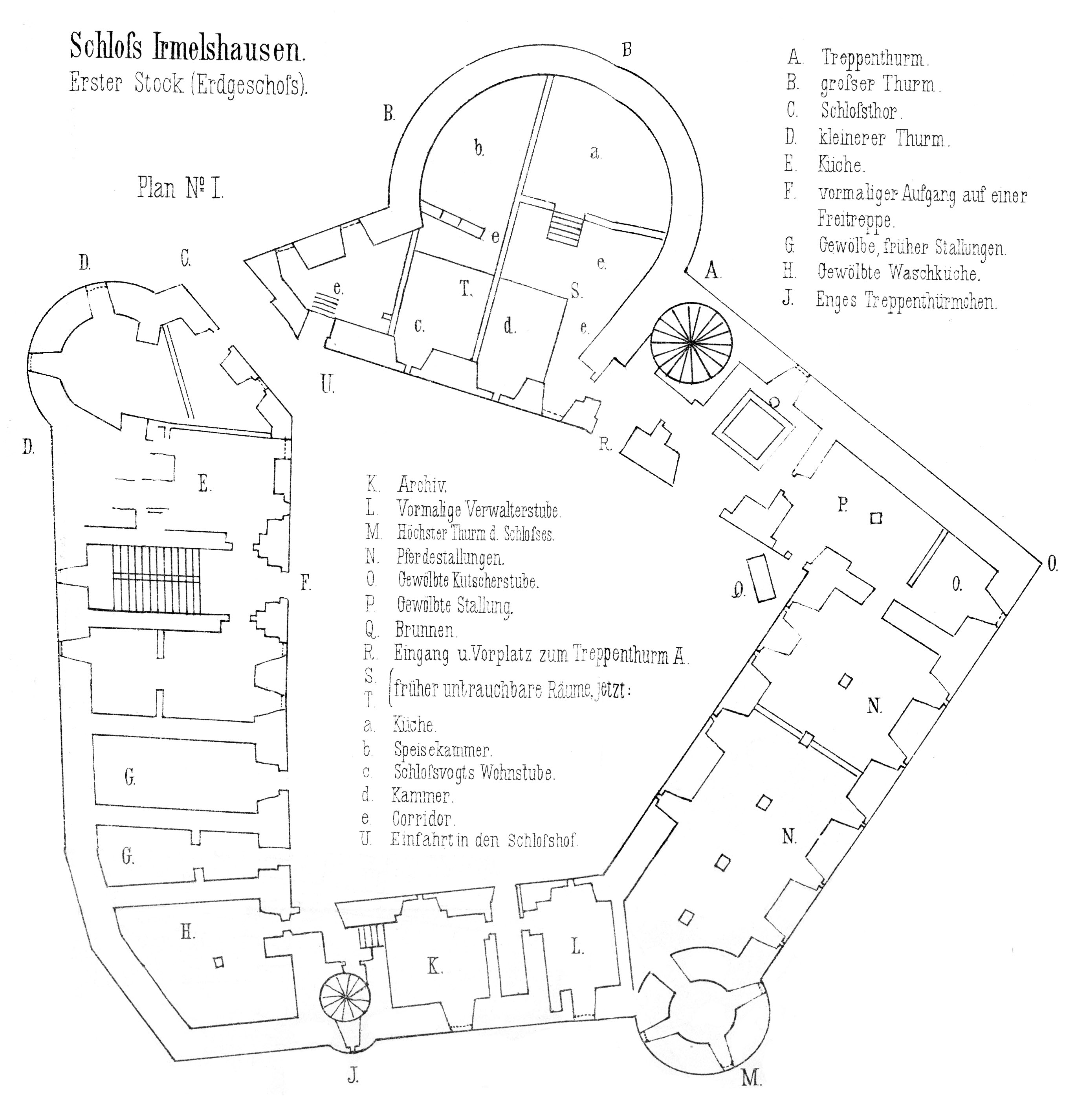
Ground plan

Irmelshausen is a village in the municipality of Höchheim in the district of Rhön-Grabfeld in Bavaria in Germany.

== Castle ==
Irmelshausen is best known for its castle and related church. Irmelshausen, on the old border between East and West Germany, is one of the most appealing castles in this region of Germany (Franconia). Irmelshausen is first mentioned in the year 800 when Emhild, the Abbess of Milz and a relative of Charlemagne, gave the village to the Counts of Henneberg. In 1354, upon the marriage of Countess Elisabeth with the Count Eberhard of Württemberg, the village was sold to the Bishopric of Würzburg. Twenty-two years later the bishopric transferred it to Berthold von Bibra. Since that time, it has been greatly enlarged and has been one of the main seats of the Bibra family. Parts of the castle were previously taller but during a remodeling in 1854 the half-timbered sections were lowered to the present height.

Until recently it was the site of the Bibra family archives which were fortunately moved to Irmelshausen from Bibra prior to the German Peasants' War in 1524-25. The second seat of the von Bibra family, through diplomacy it escaped attack and destruction in both the Peasants' War of 1525 and the Thirty Years' War of 1618-48 when almost all the surrounding castles were taken and sacked.

It is said that the first enemy soldier to enter the castle during World War II did so on April 8, 1945. The American Col. Vennard Wilson was served tea, noted the contents of the castle and ordered it off limits to troops.

The castle consists of building (3 parts), the two farms and the forest is owned by the Bibra family (older and younger lines) and the adopted daughter of the Bibra family who is by birth a Guttenberg and by marriage a Stauffenberg.

Besides the five-sided castle, the late Gothic church with its numerous Bibra gravestones from the 16th and 17th centuries is worth visiting.

== Bibliography ==
- Bibra, Wilhelm Frhr. von, 1880: Beiträge zur Familien Geschichte der Reichsfreiherrn von Bibra, Erster Band (vol. 1)
- Bibra, Wilhelm Frhr. von, 1882: Beiträge zur Familien Geschichte der Reichsfreiherrn von Bibra, Zweiter Band (vol. 2)
- Bibra, Wilhelm Frhr. von, 1888: Beiträge zur Familien Geschichte der Reichsfreiherrn von Bibra, Dritter Band (vol. 3)
- Karlinger, Hans, 1915: Die Kunstdenkmäler von Bayern, III, 13. Bezirksamt Königshofen. Munich; reprinted Munich 1983 ISBN 3-486-50467-3
- Sayn-Wittgenstein, Franz, 1974: Schlosser in Franken: Residenzen Und Landsitze Im Frankischen ISBN 3-406-03575-2 ISBN 978-3-406-03575-3
