= Streu =

Streu may refer to:

- Streu (Kahl), a river of Bavaria, Germany, tributary of the Kahl
- Streu (Franconian Saale), a river of Bavaria and Thuringia, Germany, tributary of the Franconian Saale
- Streu, a subdivision of Bergen auf Rügen in Mecklenburg-Vorpommern, Germany
