= Heustreu =

- Municipality
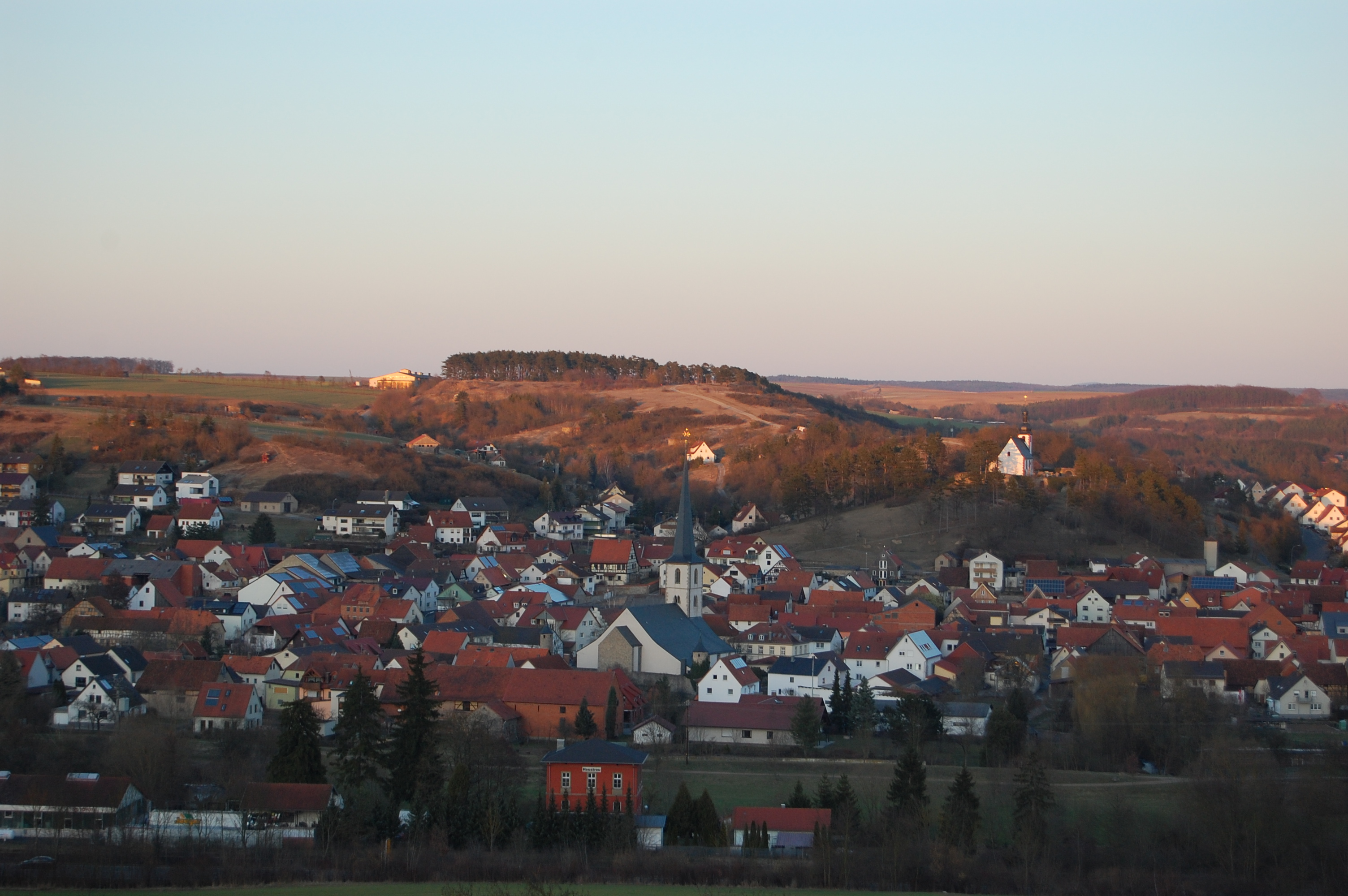
- General view of the village

- Coat of arms

- Location of Heustreu within Rhön-Grabfeld district
- Interactive map of Heustreu
- Location within Germany Location within Bavaria
- Coordinates: 50°21′N 10°15′E
- Country: Germany
- State: Bavaria
- Admin. region: Unterfranken
- District: Rhön-Grabfeld
- Municipal assoc.: Heustreu

Government
  - Mayor (2020–26): Ansgar Zimmer

Area
  - Total: 10.56 km^{2} (4.08 sq mi)
- Elevation: 232 m (761 ft)

Population (2025-12-31)
  - Total: 1,263
  - Density: 119.6/km^{2} (309.8/sq mi)
- Time zone: UTC+01:00 (CET)
  - Summer (DST): UTC+02:00 (CEST)
- Postal codes: 97618
- Dialling codes: 09773
- Vehicle registration: NES
- Website: www.heustreu.de

Heustreu is a municipality in the district of Rhön-Grabfeld in Lower Franconia in Germany. It lies on the river Streu.

Heustreu is situated in the Main-Rhön region in the very north of Lower Franconia. The Rhön mountains are a low mountain range in the very north of Bavaria, Hesse and Thuringia. The most successful football club in Heustreu is the TSV 1894 Heustreu e.V., which plays in the Kreisklasse of the Rhön-Grabfeld district.

== History ==
Heustreu was first mentioned in 1057 when a Polish princess gave the village as a present to the diocese of Würzburg. The document in which this donation was certified is seen as the founding date of the village, although there might have been settlements on the soil at earlier times. The strategic importance of the village, which is situated on the confluence of the river "Streu" and "Saale", has been important since ancient times. Heustreu is located on the old salt street and the nearby mountain "Altenberg" (Old Mountain) is a vantage point because the valley of "Streu" and "Saale" can be overlooked from there.

== TSV 1894 Heustreu e.V. ==
The local football (soccer) team of Heustreu is the TSV 1894. The team promoted in 2007 to the Kreisklasse Rhön-Grabfeld 3, in which the team is now playing and still hoping not to relegate again. Coach of the team is Ali Louzri, who has already coached the team for the last 3 years. President of the club is Klaus Eisenmann.

== Economy, agriculture and forestry ==
According to official statistics of 1998, 258 people are employed in manufacturing. The total workforce of the village is 1031. Most of them work in the nearby city of Bad Neustadt, in which Siemens, Preh and the Rhön Klinikum AG are the biggest employers. There are eight construction businesses and 76 agricultural businesses.
