= Paulus Melissus =

German writer in Latin, translator and composer (1539-1602)

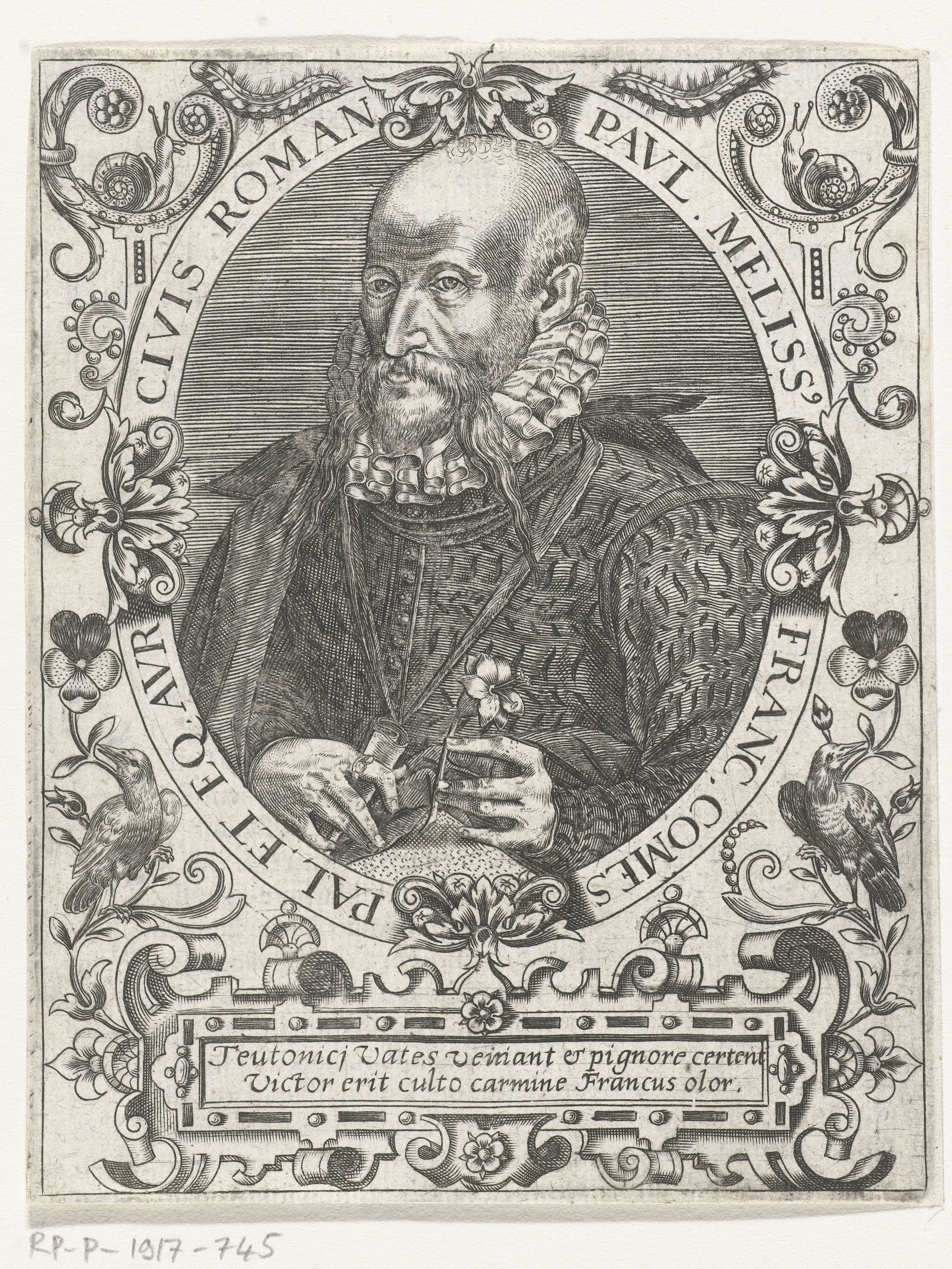
Paulus Melissus.

Paulus Melissus (also: Paul Melissus, Paul Schede, or Paulus Schedius Melissus; 20 December 1539 – 3 February 1602) was a humanist Neo-Latin writer, translator and composer.

== Life ==
Melissus was born in Mellrichstadt. He studied and attended school in Zwickau from 1557 to 1559, and studied philology in Erfurt and Jena. From 1560 to 1564 he lived in Vienna, where in 1561 he became poet laureate. He stayed in Prague, Wittenberg and Leipzig, and was called to the court of the bishop of Würzburg and went on a campaign to Hungary with him.

He was an ambassador in the service of Emperor Maximilian II and Rudolf II, and traveled to France, Switzerland, Italy, and England and was ultimately director of the Electoral library (the Bibliotheca Palatina) in Heidelberg, where he died.

Melissus translated works of Clément Marot and Théodore de Bèze for the Huguenot church services in rhyme using the Psalms in German. He was the first to use the sonnet and the terza rima in German lyric. In his lifetime he was recognized as an author fully versed in Latin love poetry.

== Works ==
- Cantiones, poems (1566)
- Psalmen Davids (1572)
- Schediasmata, poems (1574)
- Schediasmatum reliquiae, poems (1575)
- Epigrammata (1580)
- Odae Palatinae (1588)
- Meletemata, poems (1595)

== Literature ==
- Erich Schmidt (1885). "Melissus, Paul Schede". Allgemeine Deutsche Biographie (in German). Vol. 21. Leipzig: Duncker & Humblot. pp. 293–297.
- Jörg-Ulrich Fechner, Hans Dehnhard (1994). "Melissus, Paulus". Neue Deutsche Biographie (in German). Vol. 17. Berlin: Duncker & Humblot. pp. 15–16.
- Fritz Roth, Restlose Auswertungen von Leichenpredigten für genealogische und kulturhistorische Zwecke. Bd. 5 R 4941
- Wolfgang Klose: Das Wittenberger Gelehrtenstammbuch: das Stammbuch von Abraham Ulrich (1549-1577) und David Ulrich (1580-1623), Halle: Mitteldt. Verl., 1999, ISBN 3-932776-76-3
