= Aubstadt =

- Municipality
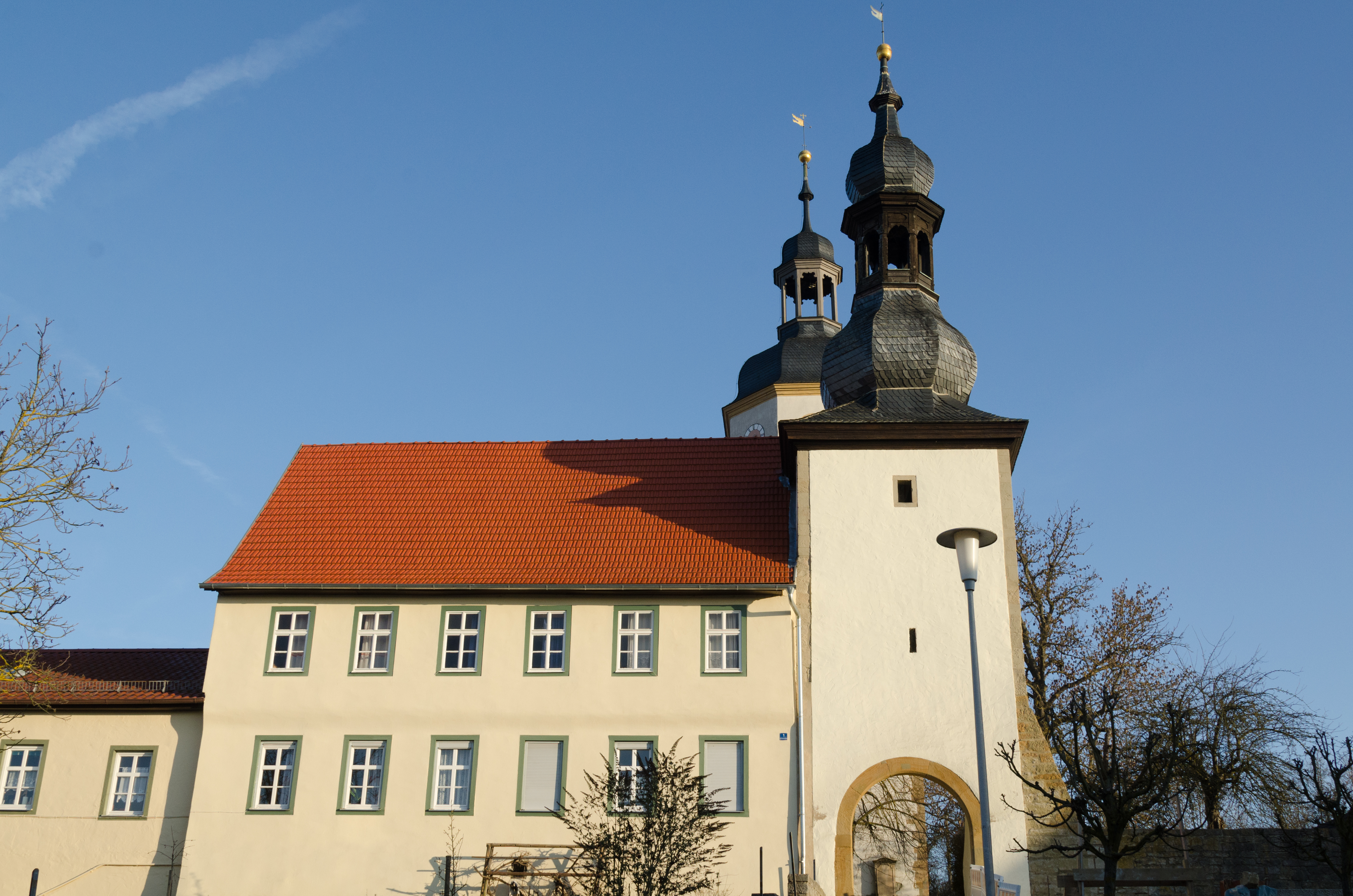
- Kirchenrangen

- Coat of arms

- Location of Aubstadt within Rhön-Grabfeld district
- Interactive map of Aubstadt
- Location within Germany Location within Bavaria
- Coordinates: 50°20′N 10°26′E
- Country: Germany
- State: Bavaria
- Admin. region: Unterfranken
- District: Rhön-Grabfeld
- Municipal assoc.: Bad Königshofen im Grabfeld

Government
  - Mayor (2020–26): Burkhard Wachenbrönner

Area
  - Total: 11.93 km^{2} (4.61 sq mi)
- Elevation: 326 m (1,070 ft)

Population (2025-12-31)
  - Total: 736
  - Density: 61.7/km^{2} (160/sq mi)
- Time zone: UTC+01:00 (CET)
  - Summer (DST): UTC+02:00 (CEST)
- Postal codes: 97633
- Dialling codes: 09761
- Vehicle registration: NES
- Website: www.aubstadt.de

Aubstadt is a municipality in the district of Rhön-Grabfeld in Bavaria in Germany.

== Sport ==
The town's association football club TSV Aubstadt, formed in 1921, experienced its greatest success in 2019 when it won promotion to tier-four Regionalliga Bayern for the first time.
