= Oberstreu =

- Municipality
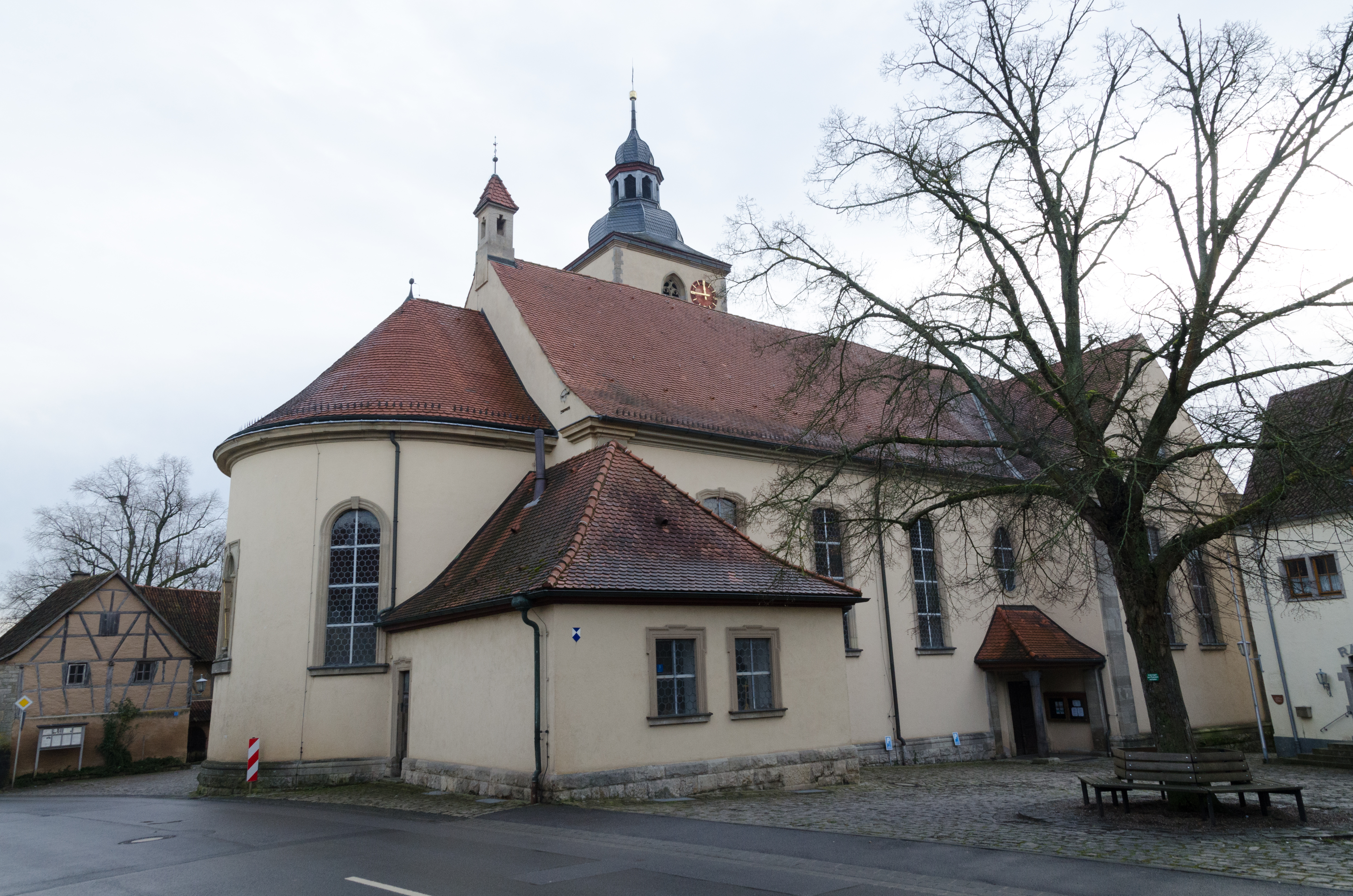
- Church of Saint Andrew

- Coat of arms

- Location of Oberstreu within Rhön-Grabfeld district
- Interactive map of Oberstreu
- Location within Germany Location within Bavaria
- Coordinates: 50°24′N 10°17′E
- Country: Germany
- State: Bavaria
- Admin. region: Unterfranken
- District: Rhön-Grabfeld
- Municipal assoc.: Mellrichstadt

Government
  - Mayor (2020–26): Stefan Kießner

Area
  - Total: 22.60 km^{2} (8.73 sq mi)
- Elevation: 256 m (840 ft)

Population (2025-12-31)
  - Total: 1,464
  - Density: 64.78/km^{2} (167.8/sq mi)
- Time zone: UTC+01:00 (CET)
  - Summer (DST): UTC+02:00 (CEST)
- Postal codes: 97640
- Dialling codes: 09776
- Vehicle registration: NES
- Website: www.oberstreu.de

Oberstreu is a municipality in the district of Rhön-Grabfeld in Bavaria in Germany.

== Mayor ==
In March 2020 Stefan Kießner was elected mayor.
