= Historical Social Research =

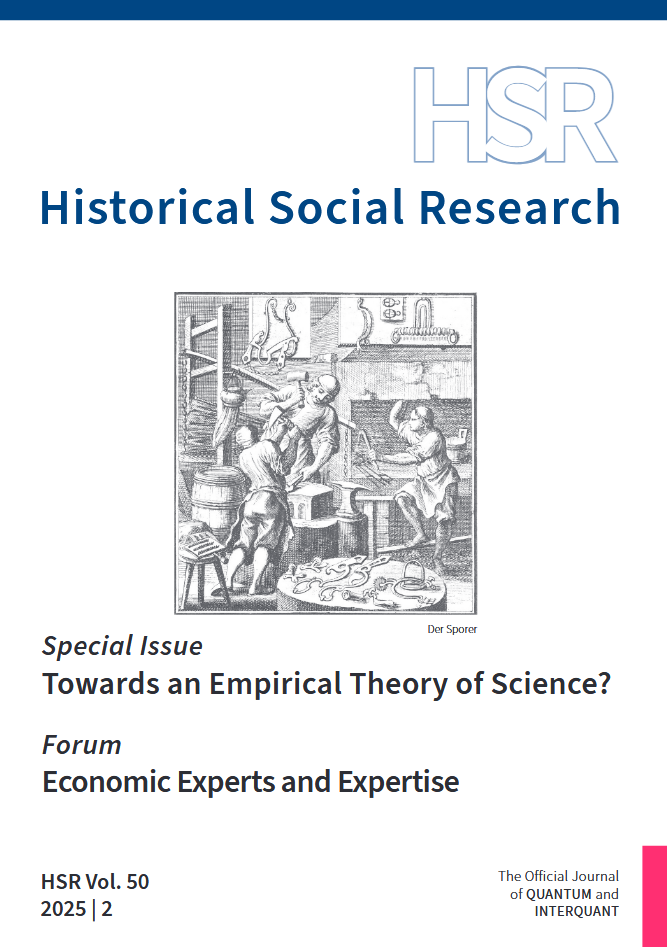
- Discipline: Social history, humanities, social science
- Language: English, German
- Edited by: Wilhelm Heinz Schröder, Heinrich Best

Publication details
- Former name: QUANTUM Information
- History: 1976-present
- Publisher: Leibniz Institute for Social Sciences
- Frequency: Quarterly
- Open access: Delayed, after 6 months
- Impact factor: 0.806 (2021)

Standard abbreviations
- ISO 4: Hist. Soc. Res.

Indexing
- ISSN: 0172-6404
- LCCN: 83644046
- JSTOR: 01726404
- OCLC no.: 224464663

Links
- Journal homepage; Online access; Online archive

Historical Social Research is a quarterly peer-reviewed academic journal covering political science, social science, cultural studies, and history. It is the official journal of the QUANTUM association and is published by GESIS – Leibniz Institute for the Social Sciences. The journal was established in 1976 as QUANTUM Information and was renamed Historical Social Research/Historische Sozialforschung in 1979, with the inclusion of both English and German titles representing the original bilingual nature of the journal. Due to the internationalization of the journal over the past few decades, its title was shortened in 2021 to the current one. The editors-in-chief are Wilhelm Heinz Schröder and Heinrich Best.

== Abstracting and indexing ==
The journal is abstracted and indexed in:

- EBSCO databases
- International Bibliography of Periodical Literature
- International Bibliography of the Social Sciences
- Scopus
- Social Sciences Citation Index
- Sociological Abstracts

According to the Journal Citation Reports, the journal has a 2021 impact factor of 0.806.
