= Bad Königshofen im Grabfeld (Verwaltungsgemeinschaft) =

- Verwaltungsgemeinschaft
- Location of Bad Königshofen im Grabfeld within Rhön-Grabfeld district
- Interactive map of Bad Königshofen im Grabfeld
- Location within Germany Location within Bavaria
- Coordinates: 50°18′N 10°28′E
- Country: Germany
- State: Bavaria
- Admin. region: Lower Franconia
- District: Rhön-Grabfeld
- Seat: Bad Königshofen
- Subdivisions: 7 municipalities

Area
  - Total: 159.09 km^{2} (61.42 sq mi)

Population (2025-12-31)
  - Total: 7,082
  - Density: 44.52/km^{2} (115.3/sq mi)
- Time zone: UTC+01:00 (CET)
  - Summer (DST): UTC+02:00 (CEST)
- Website: www.bad-koenigshofen-vgem.de

Bad Königshofen im Grabfeld is a Verwaltungsgemeinschaft (municipal association) in the district Rhön-Grabfeld in Bavaria, Germany. Its seat is in Bad Königshofen, itself not part of the Verwaltungsgemeinschaft.

It consists of the following municipalities:

1. Aubstadt
2. Großbardorf
3. Herbstadt
4. Höchheim
5. Sulzdorf an der Lederhecke
6. Sulzfeld
7. Trappstadt
