= Heustreu (Verwaltungsgemeinschaft) =

- Verwaltungsgemeinschaft
- Location of Heustreu within Rhön-Grabfeld district
- Interactive map of Heustreu
- Location within Germany Location within Bavaria
- Coordinates: 50°21′N 10°15′E
- Country: Germany
- State: Bavaria
- Admin. region: Lower Franconia
- District: Rhön-Grabfeld
- Seat: Heustreu
- Subdivisions: 4 municipalities

Area
  - Total: 51.36 km^{2} (19.83 sq mi)

Population (2025-12-31)
  - Total: 5,142
  - Density: 100.1/km^{2} (259.3/sq mi)
- Time zone: UTC+01:00 (CET)
  - Summer (DST): UTC+02:00 (CEST)
- Website: www.heustreu-vgem.de

Heustreu is a Verwaltungsgemeinschaft (municipal association) in the district Rhön-Grabfeld in Bavaria, Germany. Its seat is in Heustreu.

It consists of the following municipalities:

1. Heustreu
2. Hollstadt
3. Unsleben
4. Wollbach
