= Herbstadt =

- Municipality
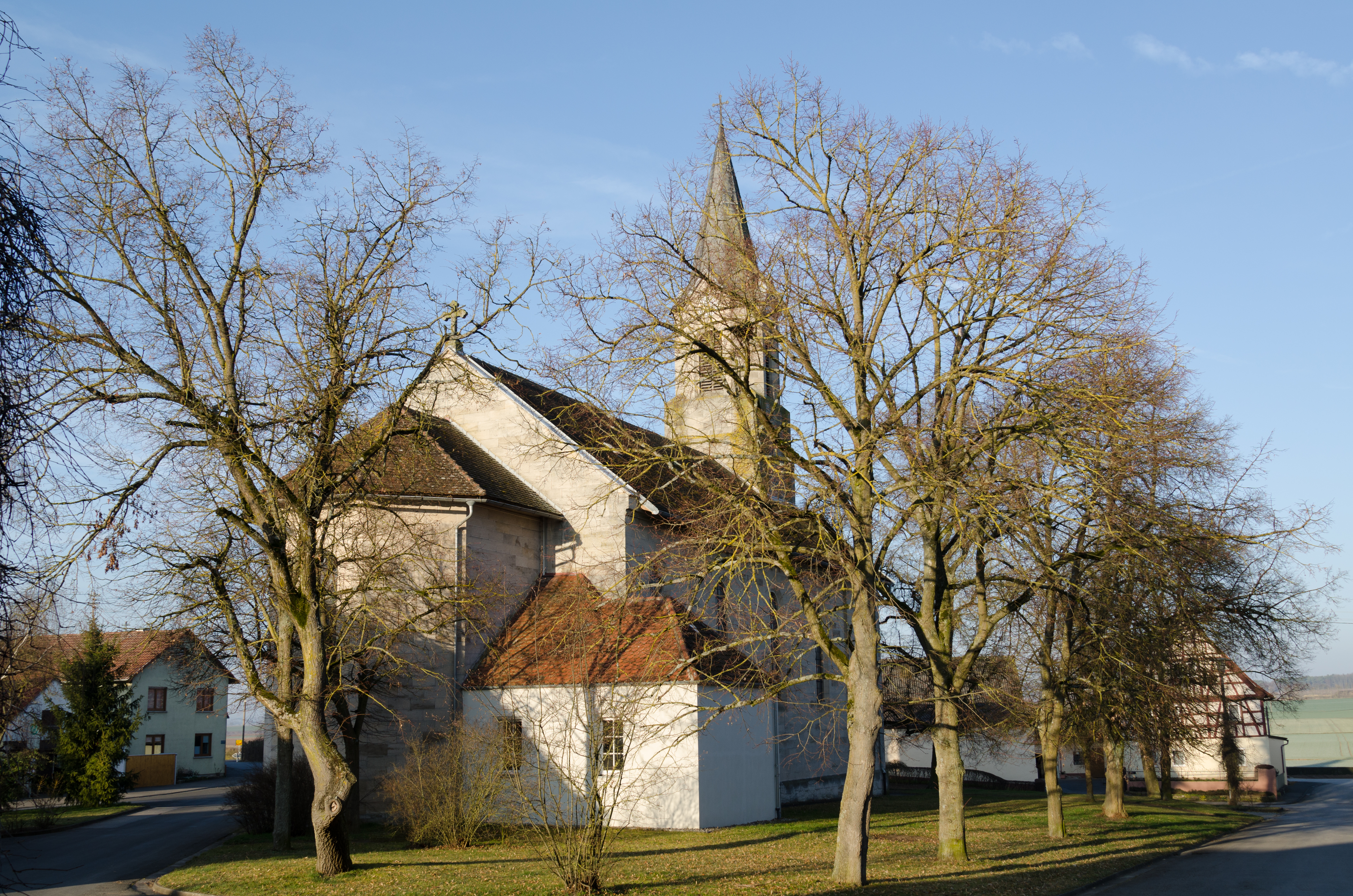
- Church of Saint Lawrence in Ottelmannshausen

- Coat of arms

- Location of Herbstadt within Rhön-Grabfeld district
- Interactive map of Herbstadt
- Location within Germany Location within Bavaria
- Coordinates: 50°20′N 10°30′E
- Country: Germany
- State: Bavaria
- Admin. region: Unterfranken
- District: Rhön-Grabfeld
- Municipal assoc.: Bad Königshofen im Grabfeld

Government
  - Mayor (2020–26): Georg Rath (CSU)

Area
  - Total: 20.69 km^{2} (7.99 sq mi)
- Elevation: 308 m (1,010 ft)

Population (2025-12-31)
  - Total: 611
  - Density: 29.5/km^{2} (76.5/sq mi)
- Time zone: UTC+01:00 (CET)
  - Summer (DST): UTC+02:00 (CEST)
- Postal codes: 97633
- Dialling codes: 09761
- Vehicle registration: NES
- Website: www.herbstadt.de

Herbstadt is a municipality in the district of Rhön-Grabfeld in Bavaria in Germany. It includes the following villages: Breitensee, Herbstadt, Ottelmannshausen and a hamlet: Dörfleshof.
