= Höchheim =

- Municipality
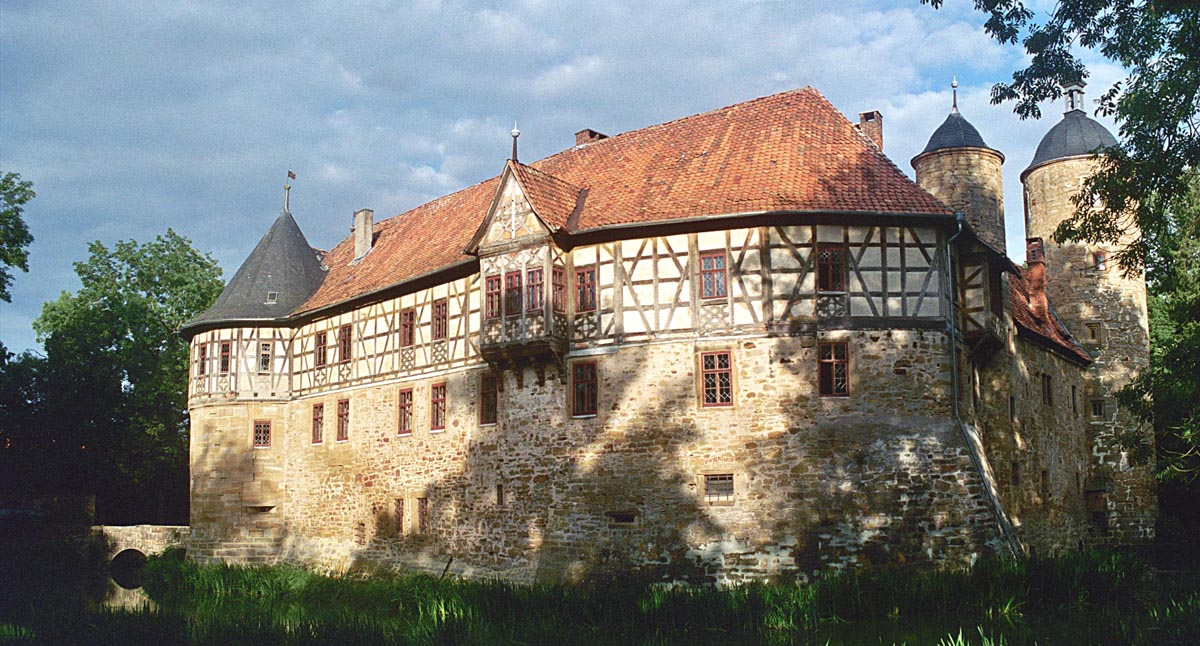
- Irmelshausen Castle

- Coat of arms

- Location of Höchheim within Rhön-Grabfeld district
- Interactive map of Höchheim
- Location within Germany Location within Bavaria
- Coordinates: 50°22′N 10°27′E
- Country: Germany
- State: Bavaria
- Admin. region: Unterfranken
- District: Rhön-Grabfeld
- Municipal assoc.: Bad Königshofen im Grabfeld

Government
  - Mayor (2020–26): Michael Hey

Area
  - Total: 25.25 km^{2} (9.75 sq mi)
- Elevation: 296 m (971 ft)

Population (2025-12-31)
  - Total: 1,023
  - Density: 40.51/km^{2} (104.9/sq mi)
- Time zone: UTC+01:00 (CET)
  - Summer (DST): UTC+02:00 (CEST)
- Postal codes: 97633
- Dialling codes: 09764
- Vehicle registration: NES
- Website: hoechheim.rhoen-saale.net

Höchheim (German pronunciation: [ˈhøːçˌhaɪm]) is a municipality in the district of Rhön-Grabfeld in Bavaria in Germany. Höchheim consists of the following villages: Gollmuthhausen, Höchheim, Irmelshausen, Rothausen.

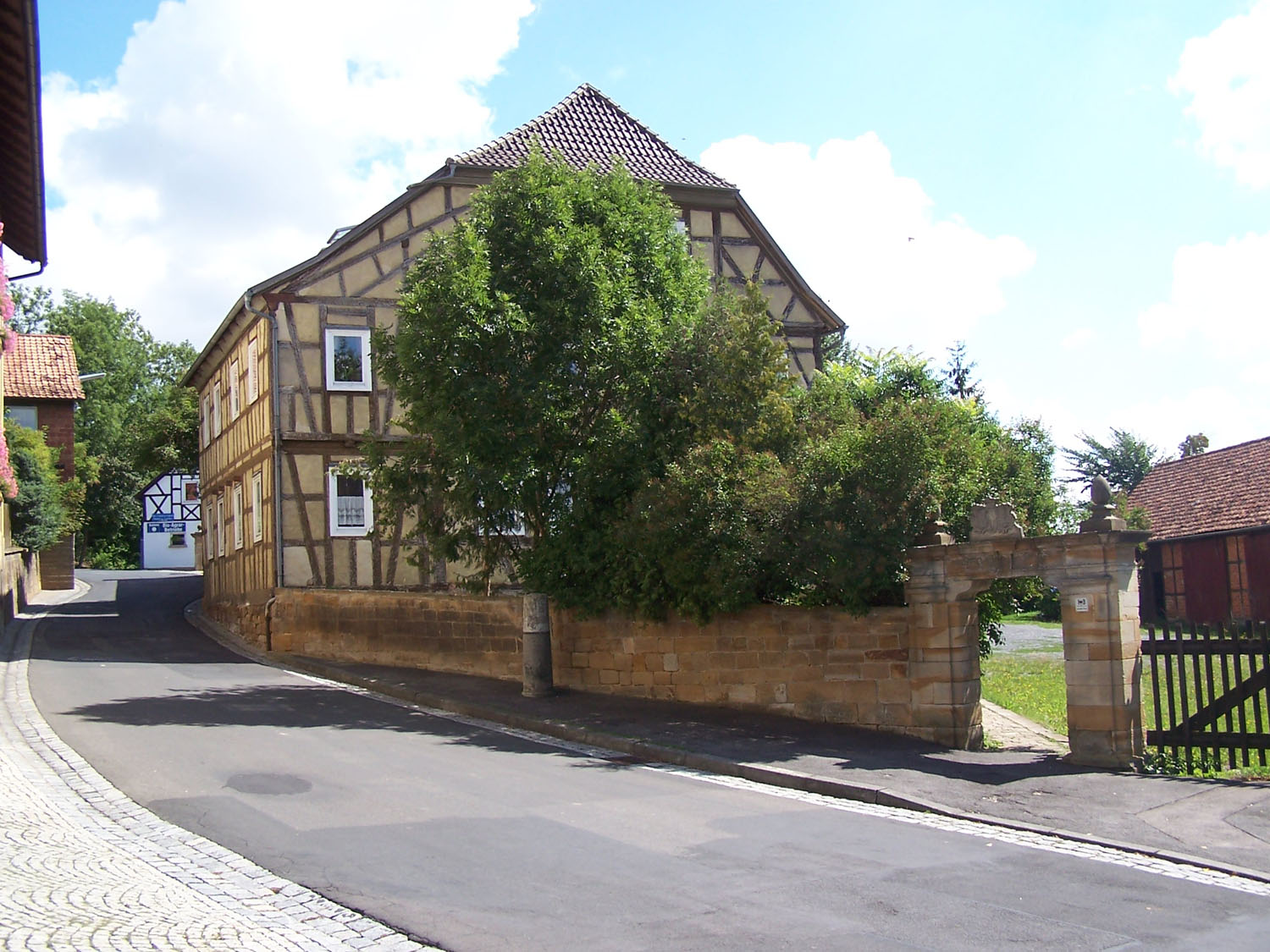
Former Bibra. Manor House

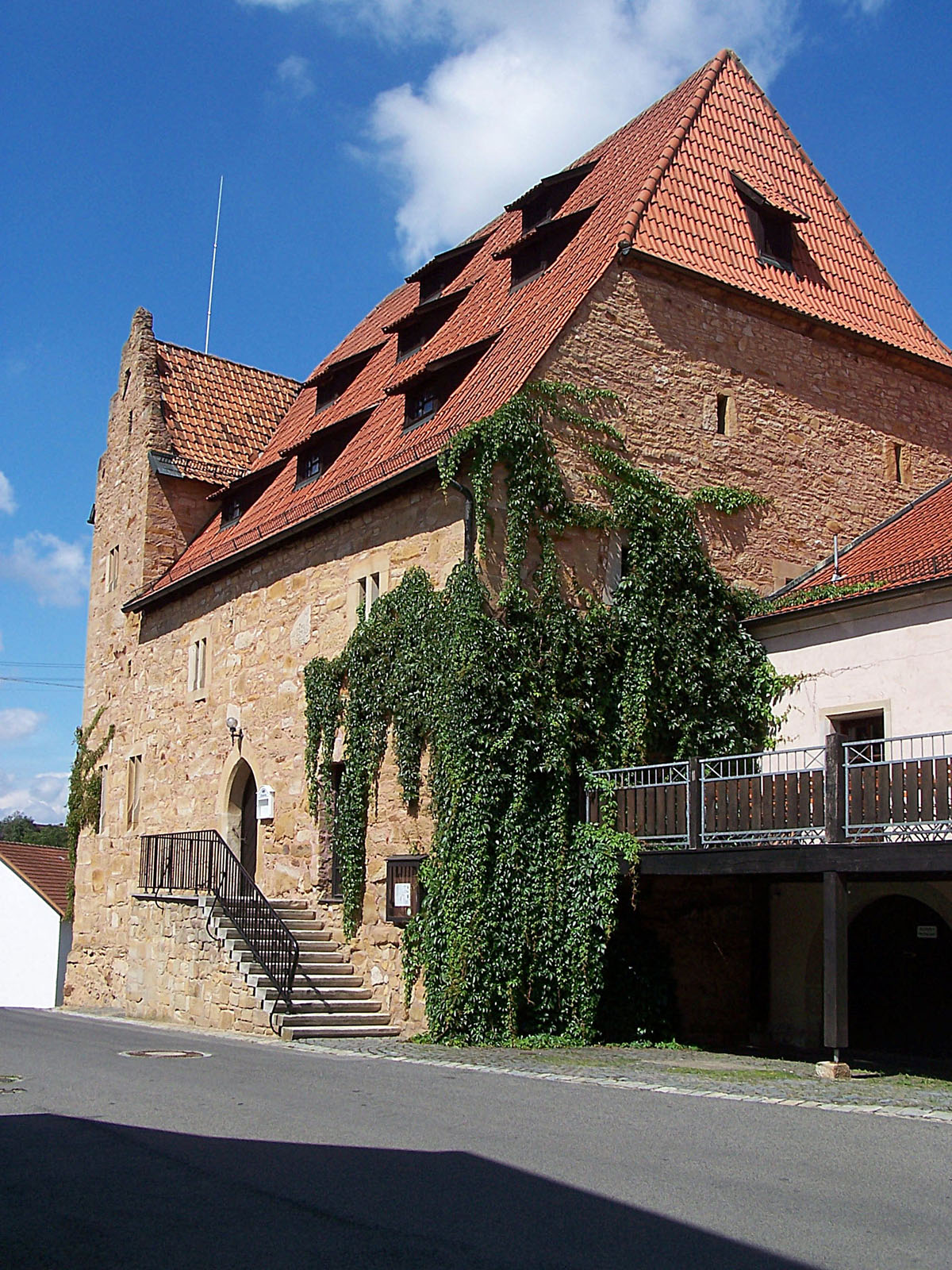
Bibra Customs House

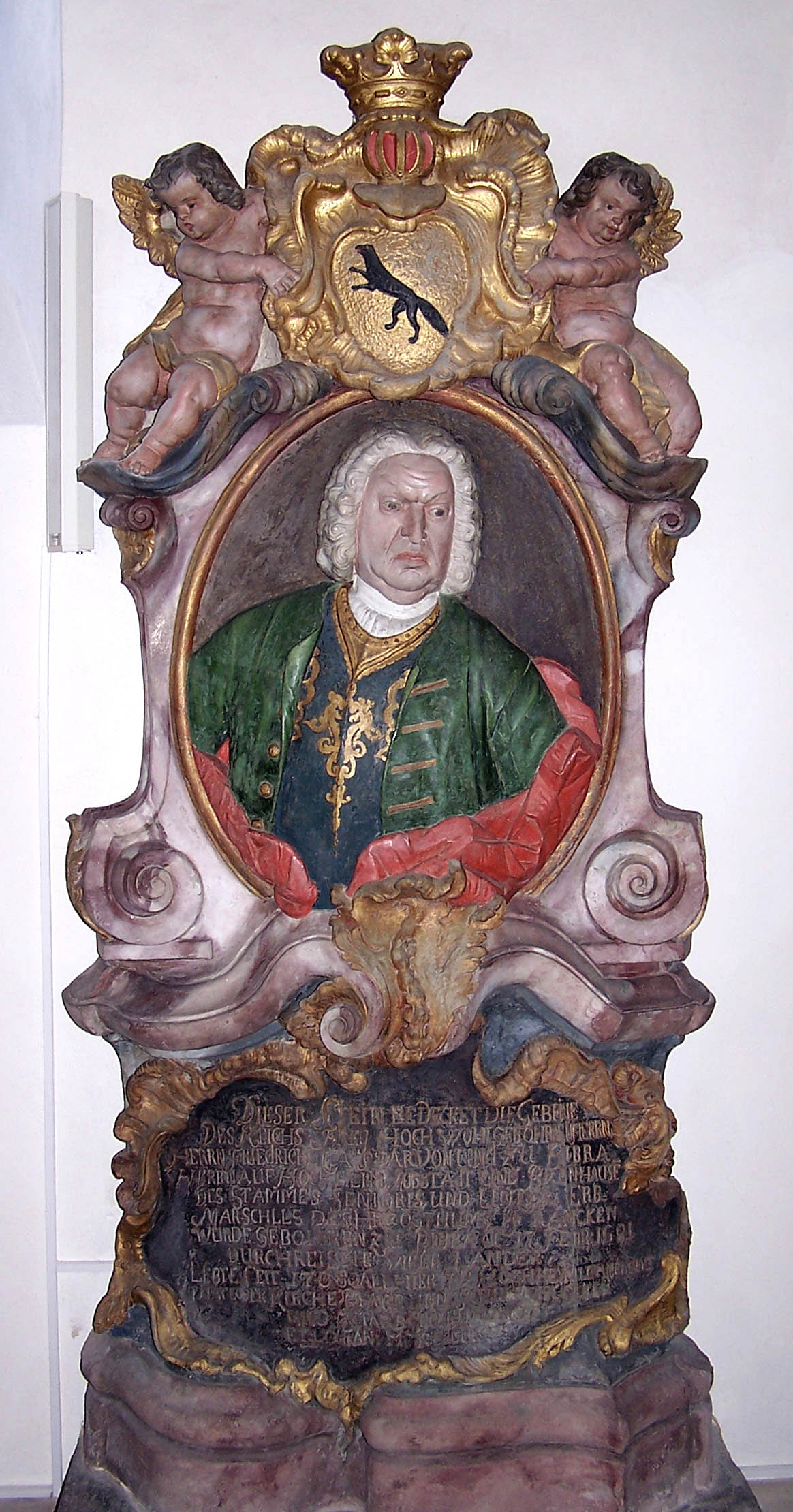
Friedrich Kaspar von Bibra (1681–1750)
