= Mellrichstadt (Verwaltungsgemeinschaft) =

- Verwaltungsgemeinschaft
- Location of Mellrichstadt within Rhön-Grabfeld district
- Interactive map of Mellrichstadt
- Location within Germany Location within Bavaria
- Coordinates: 50°26′N 10°18′E
- Country: Germany
- State: Bavaria
- Admin. region: Lower Franconia
- District: Rhön-Grabfeld
- Seat: Mellrichstadt
- Subdivisions: 5 municipalities

Area
  - Total: 162.85 km^{2} (62.88 sq mi)

Population (2025-12-31)
  - Total: 10,751
  - Density: 66.018/km^{2} (170.99/sq mi)
- Time zone: UTC+01:00 (CET)
  - Summer (DST): UTC+02:00 (CEST)
- Website: www.vg-mellrichstadt.de

Mellrichstadt is a Verwaltungsgemeinschaft (municipal association) in the district Rhön-Grabfeld in Bavaria, Germany. Its seat is in Mellrichstadt.

It consists of the following municipalities:

1. Bastheim
2. Hendungen
3. Mellrichstadt
4. Oberstreu
5. Stockheim
