= Großbardorf =

- Municipality
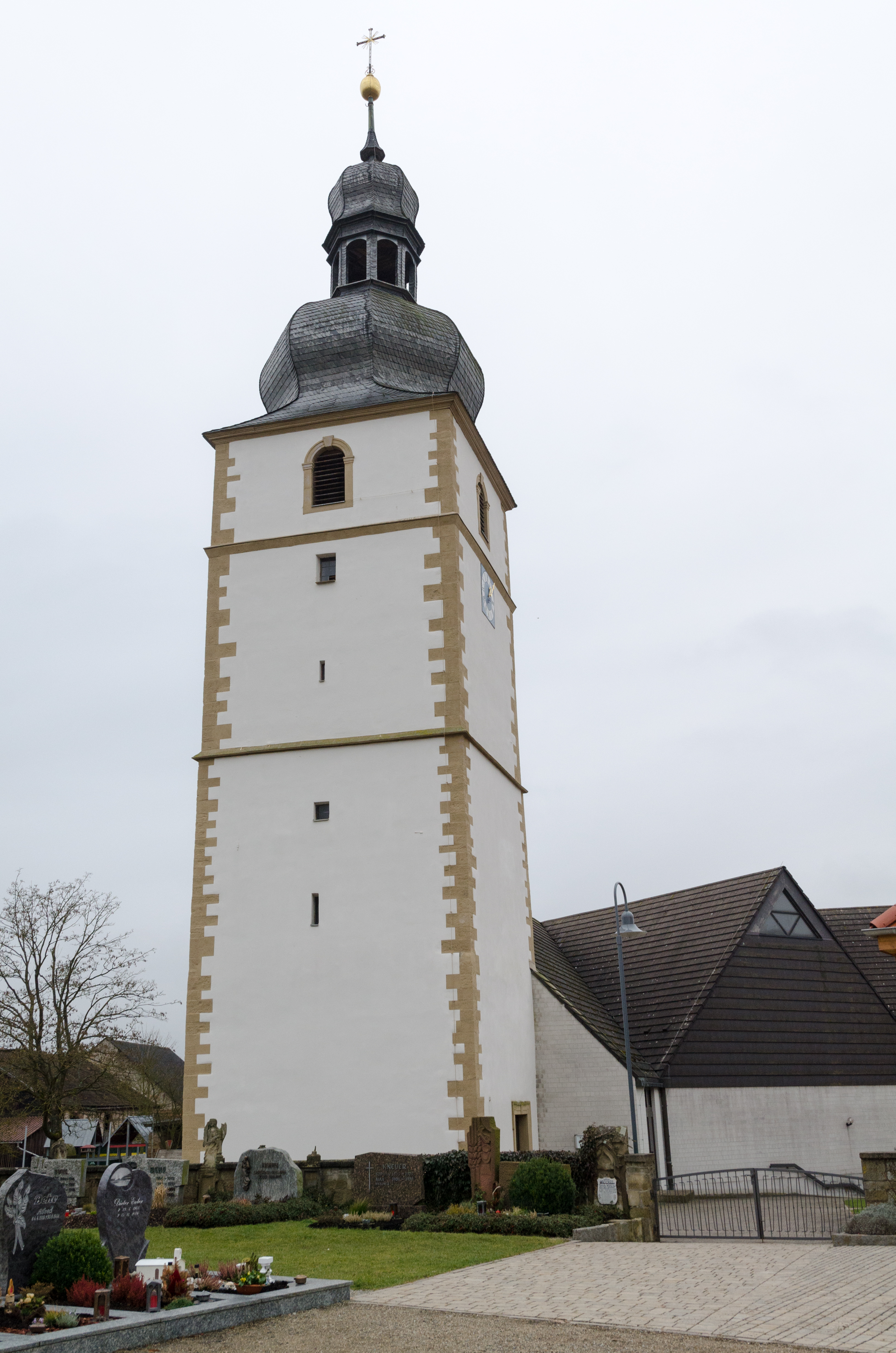
- Church of Saint Margaret

- Coat of arms

- Location of Großbardorf within Rhön-Grabfeld district
- Interactive map of Großbardorf
- Location within Germany Location within Bavaria
- Coordinates: 50°16′N 10°22′E
- Country: Germany
- State: Bavaria
- Admin. region: Unterfranken
- District: Rhön-Grabfeld
- Municipal assoc.: Bad Königshofen im Grabfeld

Government
  - Mayor (2020–26): Josef Demar (CSU)

Area
  - Total: 16.54 km^{2} (6.39 sq mi)
- Elevation: 296 m (971 ft)

Population (2025-12-31)
  - Total: 931
  - Density: 56.3/km^{2} (146/sq mi)
- Time zone: UTC+01:00 (CET)
  - Summer (DST): UTC+02:00 (CEST)
- Postal codes: 97633
- Dialling codes: 09766
- Vehicle registration: NES
- Website: www.grossbardorf.de

Großbardorf is a municipality in the district of Rhön-Grabfeld in Bavaria in Germany.
