= Hendungen =

- Municipality
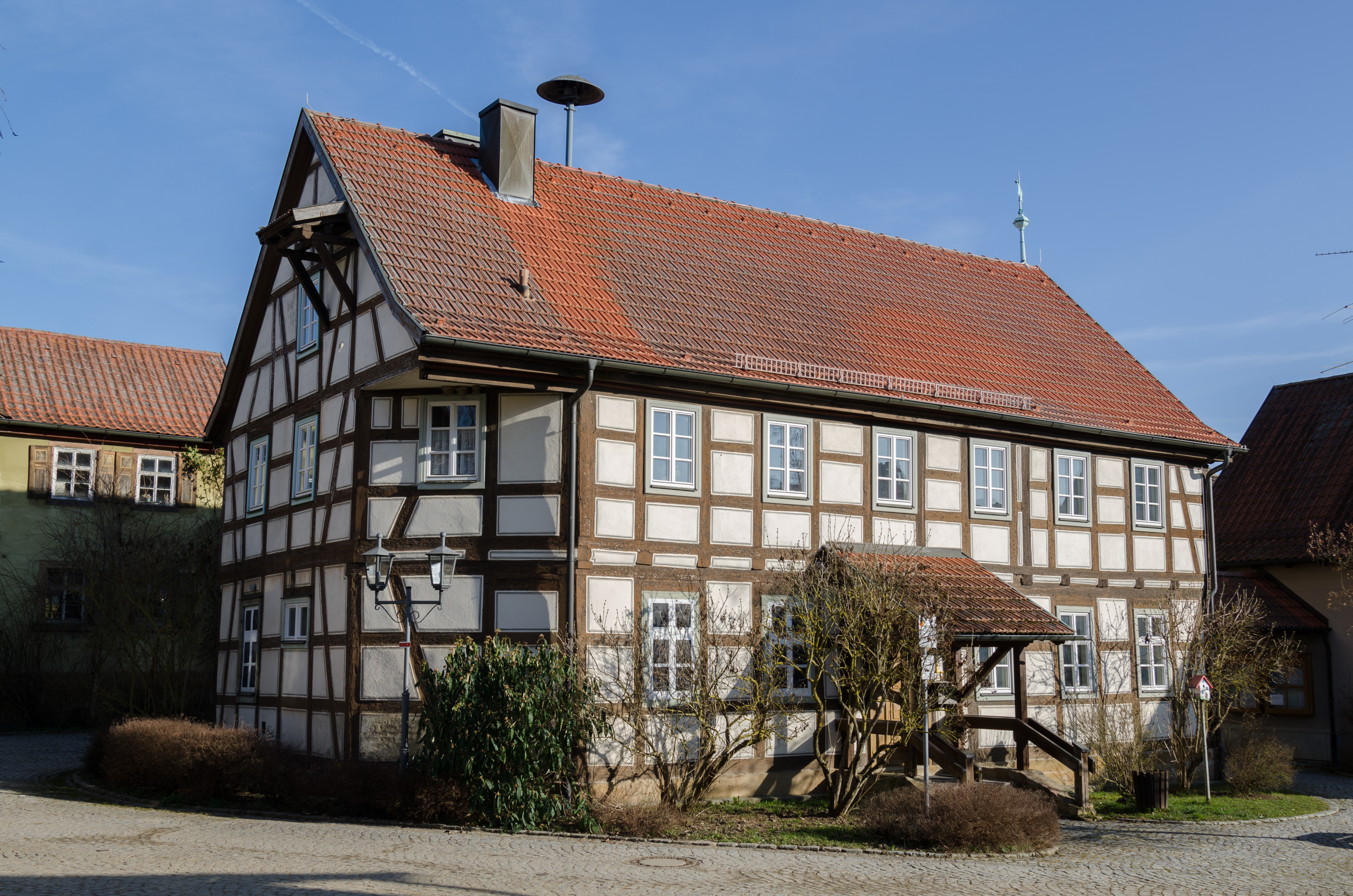
- Fachwerkhaus in the village

- Coat of arms

- Location of Hendungen within Rhön-Grabfeld district
- Interactive map of Hendungen
- Location within Germany Location within Bavaria
- Coordinates: 50°24′N 10°21′E
- Country: Germany
- State: Bavaria
- Admin. region: Unterfranken
- District: Rhön-Grabfeld
- Municipal assoc.: Mellrichstadt

Government
  - Mayor (2020–26): Florian Liening-Ewert

Area
  - Total: 22.85 km^{2} (8.82 sq mi)
- Elevation: 308 m (1,010 ft)

Population (2025-12-31)
  - Total: 824
  - Density: 36.1/km^{2} (93.4/sq mi)
- Time zone: UTC+01:00 (CET)
  - Summer (DST): UTC+02:00 (CEST)
- Postal codes: 97640
- Dialling codes: 09776
- Vehicle registration: NES
- Website: www.hendungen.de

Hendungen is a municipality in the district of Rhön-Grabfeld in Bavaria in Germany.
