= Wechterswinkel Abbey =

Monastery in Bavaria, Germany

Coordinates: 50°23′15″N 10°13′15″E

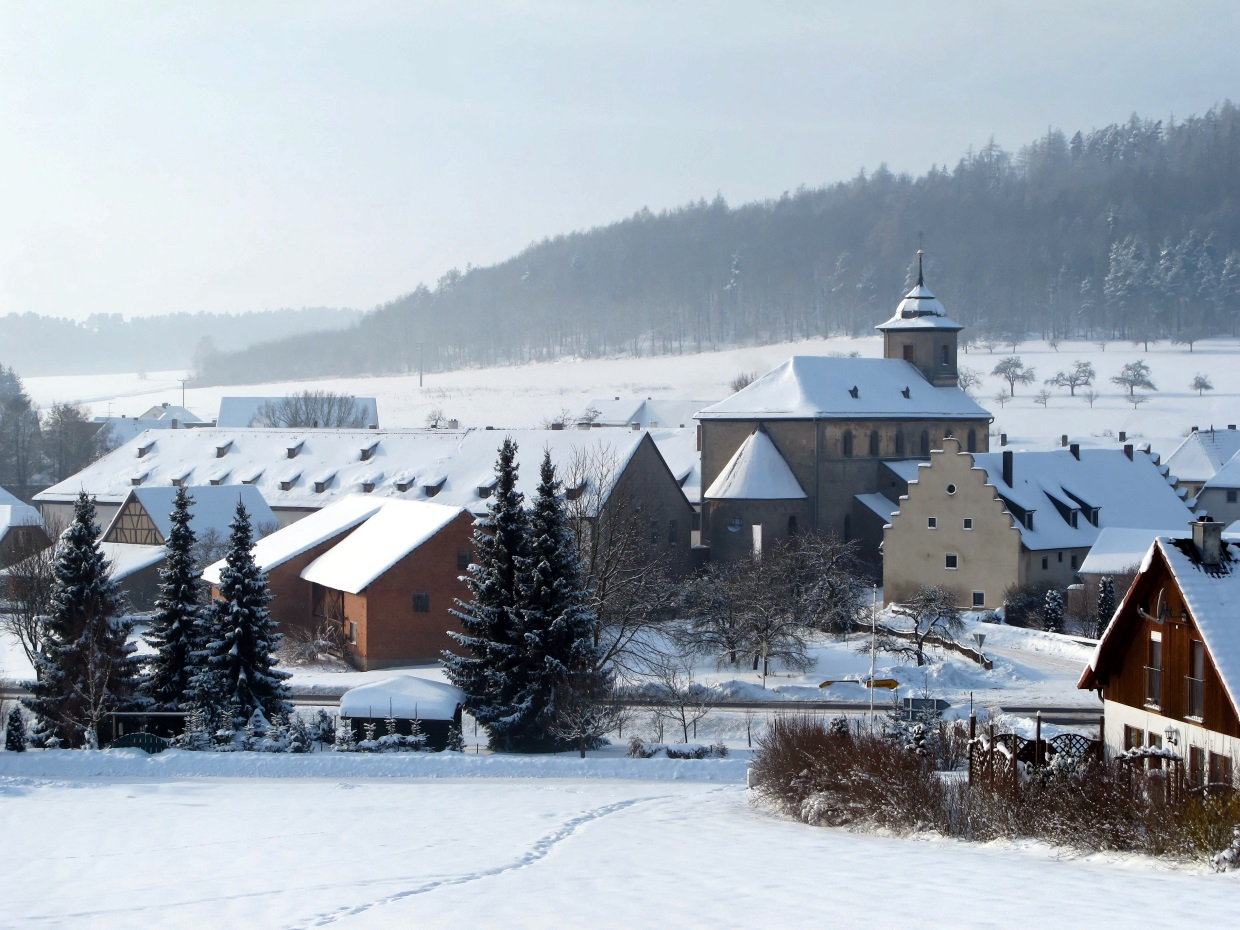
Wechterswinkel Abbey

Wechterswinkel Abbey (German: Kloster Wechterswinkel) was a Cistercian nunnery in the small village of Wechterswinkel, a part of Bastheim in the mountainous region of the Rhön in Bavaria, Germany, in the Bishopric of Würzburg.

== History ==
The abbey, dedicated to the Holy Trinity and Saint Margaret, was founded in 1134 or 1135 by Bishop Embricho of Würzburg, and King Conrad III of Germany. It was so severely damaged in the wars of the early 16th century that it was unable to continue, and was dissolved in 1592 by Julius Echter von Mespelbrunn, the then bishop of Würzburg. The assets realised were invested to endow parish benefices and schools.

== Buildings ==
The church, a Romanesque basilica heavily altered in the early 19th century, has survived as the village parish church, now dedicated to Saints Cosmas and Damian.

Some of the monastic buildings also survive, put to secular uses, but have been comprehensively altered and retain no medieval character.
