= Rhön-Grabfeld =

Coordinates: 50°20′N 10°15′E

- District
- Flag Coat of arms
- Country: Germany
- State: Bavaria
- Adm. region: Lower Franconia
- Capital: Bad Neustadt

Government
  - District admin.: Thomas Habermann (CSU)

Area
  - Total: 1,022 km^{2} (395 sq mi)

Population (31 December 2025)
  - Total: 78,902
  - Density: 77.20/km^{2} (200.0/sq mi)
- Time zone: UTC+01:00 (CET)
  - Summer (DST): UTC+02:00 (CEST)
- Vehicle registration: NES, MET
- Website: www.rhoen-grabfeld.de

Rhön-Grabfeld is a Landkreis (district) in Bavaria, Germany. It is bounded by (from the southeast and clockwise) the districts of Hassberge, Schweinfurt and Bad Kissingen, and the states of Hesse (district Fulda) and Thuringia (districts Schmalkalden-Meiningen and Hildburghausen).

== History ==
In medieval times the region was a part of the Bishopric of Würzburg. When the clerical states of Germany were dissolved in 1803, it fell to Bavaria. The district of Rhön-Grabfeld was established in 1972, when the former districts of Bad Neustadt, Königshofen and Mellrichstadt were merged.

== Geography ==
The district consists of two distinct areas: The eastern parts of the Rhön mountains and the Bavarian portion of Grabfeld.

Grabfeld is a fertile region south of the Rhön mountains. Literally it means "digfield". According to local legend a queen once lost her beloved ring in the Grabfeld. She ordered her servants to dig up the whole area. When the ring was found, she was relieved and ordered a royal estate to be built where it was found. Later this estate became the city of Königshofen.

The source of the Fränkische Saale is located in the district. The river runs through the district from north to south.

== Coat of arms ==
The coat of arms displays:

- a crown representing the Grabfeld legend
- a wavy line representing the Saale River
- three summit crosses representing the mountains of the Rhön

== Towns and municipalities ==
Clickable map of towns and municipalities in the district

Towns
1. Bad Königshofen
2. Bad Neustadt
3. Bischofsheim in der Rhön
Märkte
1. Oberelsbach
Municipalities
16. Sandberg

Verwaltungsgemeinschaften
| 1. Bad Königshofen im Grabfeld; 1. Aubstadt; 2. Großbardorf; 3. Herbstadt; 4. Höchheim; 5. Sulzdorf an der Lederhecke; 6. Sulzfeld; 7. Trappstadt^{3} | 2. Bad Neustadt an der Saale; 1. Burglauer; 2. Hohenroth; 3. Niederlauer; 4. Rödelmaier; 5. Salz; 6. Schönau an der Brend; 7. Strahlungen | 3. Fladungen; 1. Fladungen^{1,2}; 2. Hausen; 3. Nordheim vor der Rhön; 4. Heustreu; 1. Heustreu^{1}; 2. Hollstadt; 3. Unsleben; 4. Wollbach | 5. Mellrichstadt; 1. Bastheim; 2. Hendungen; 3. Mellrichstadt^{1,2}; 4. Oberstreu; 5. Stockheim; 6. Ostheim vor der Rhön; 1. Ostheim^{1,2}; 2. Sondheim vor der Rhön; 3. Willmars | 7. Saal an der Saale; 1. Großeibstadt; 2. Saal an der Saale^{1,3}; 3. Wülfershausen |
^{1}seat of the Verwaltungsgemeinschaft; ^{2}town; ^{3}Markt
