= Wilhelm Heinz Schröder =

German historian

Wilhelm Heinz Schröder (born 24 May 1946) is a German historian working at Cologne University. The focus of his research and teaching is on contemporary history. He has led, coordinated and contributed to several major on-line biography projects covering German parliamentarians.

== Life ==
Wilhelm Heinz Schröder was born in Mellrichstadt, a small town in north-west Bavaria (Lower Franconia) and, for much of his life, close to the western side of the Inner German border separating East and West Germany. On his father's side he came from a line of successful farmers who had been driven out of West Prussia by the ethnic cleansing of 1944/45. His mother's family had been based in the Franconia-Thuringia region and been closely involved, since 1870, with the growing labour movement. When he was ten the family moved to Cologne.

He studied History and Germanistics at Cologne University where he received his first degree in 1971 and his doctorate (in history, supervised by Theodor Schieder) in 1976. His doctoral dissertation was later published under the title "Comrades, we should not overdo the patience. From the early history of Social Democracy 1862-1878" (""Genossen, wir dürfen uns nicht von der Geduld hinreißen lassen. Aus der Urgeschichte der Sozialdemokratie 1862-1878"). His Habilitation and Umhabilitation (higher academic qualifications) followed respectively in 1986 (Technische Universität Berlin) and 1993 (Cologne). Between 1976 and 1987 he held a succession of research and project leadership posts at Bielefeld, Bremen, Cologne and Berlin. He was appointed to his professorship at the University of Cologne in 1996, and in 2011 this appointment, which is concerned, in particular, with social historical research, became "indefinite". There have been, in parallel, various shorter teaching contracts at other high-profile German and Austrian universities.

In 1987 Schröder became department head at the Centre for Historical Research in the Social Sciences Archive with the GESIS – Leibniz Institute for the Social Sciences. Since 1986 he has served as leading producer of the Historical Social Research journal. Between 1980 and 2010 he also headed up the inter-regional Graduate Summer School for the associated "ZHSF Method Seminars".

He sits on a number of academic committees. He is president of the international working group and a spokesman for the Centre for Contemporary History at Potsdam. One of Schröder's most important projects involved researching Social Democrat parliamentarians between 1867 and 1933. In connection with this he developed the concept of "collective biography" as a research tool.

His focus on summary biographies of parliamentarians became an obvious theme with his Habilitation work which was originally published in truncated form in 1986 under the title "Biographical Handbook of Social Democratic Reichstag members and candidates ..." ("Biographisches Handbuch der Sozialdemokratische Reichstagsabgeordnete und Reichstagskandidaten 1898-1918. ..."). Schröder has subsequently brought together biographical databanks from various biographical projects that he has headed up into a single online "Parliamentary Portal" identified by the acronym "BIOPARL". It includes:

- Social Democratic members of the German Reichstag and of regional parliaments ("Landtagen") (1867-1933 (BIOSOP)
- Social Democratic candidates for Reichstag membership including Reichstag members (1898-1918) (BIOKAND)
- Members of the German Reichstag (1867-1918) (BIORAB part 2: German empire)
- Members of the German Reichstag (1919-1933) (BIORAB part 3: Weimar republic)
- Members of the West German and German Bundestag (1949-2006) (BUMAST)
- Members of the East German Volkskammer (1990) (VOLKPARL)

Wilhelm Heinz Schröder lives in Frechen, a suburb of Cologne on the western side of the city. He is involved in the community and in local politics, having for many years served on the local council.
