= Hollstadt =

- Municipality
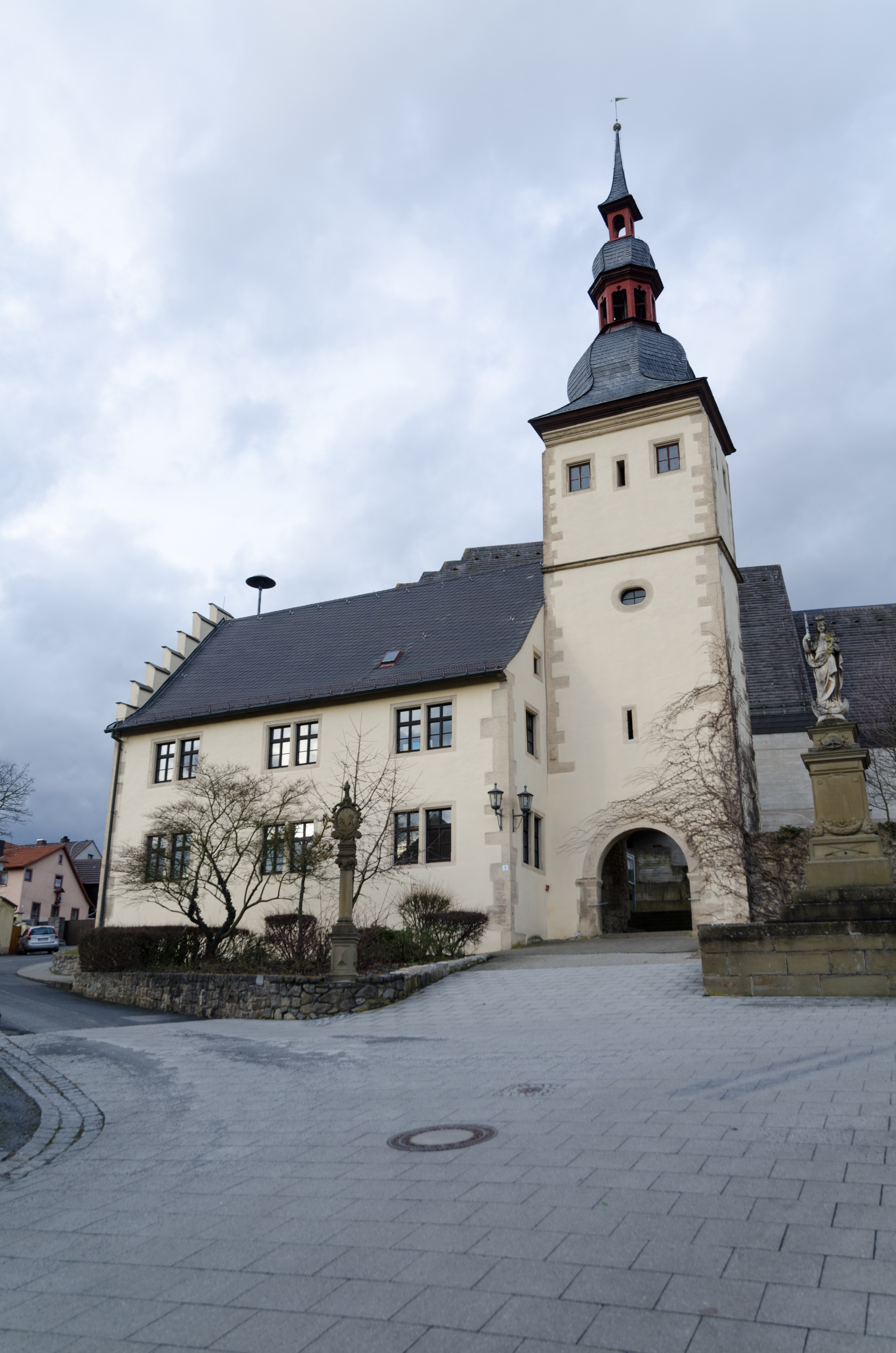
- Church yard in Hollstadt

- Coat of arms

- Location of Hollstadt within Rhön-Grabfeld district
- Interactive map of Hollstadt
- Location within Germany Location within Bavaria
- Coordinates: 50°21′N 10°18′E
- Country: Germany
- State: Bavaria
- Admin. region: Unterfranken
- District: Rhön-Grabfeld
- Municipal assoc.: Heustreu
- Subdivisions: 2 Ortsteile

Government
  - Mayor (2020–26): Georg Menninger (CSU)

Area
  - Total: 24.31 km^{2} (9.39 sq mi)
- Elevation: 252 m (827 ft)

Population (2025-12-31)
  - Total: 1,510
  - Density: 62.1/km^{2} (161/sq mi)
- Time zone: UTC+01:00 (CET)
  - Summer (DST): UTC+02:00 (CEST)
- Postal codes: 97618
- Dialling codes: 09773
- Vehicle registration: NES
- Website: www.hollstadt.de

Hollstadt is a municipality in the district of Rhön-Grabfeld in Bavaria in Germany.
