= Bastheim =

- Municipality
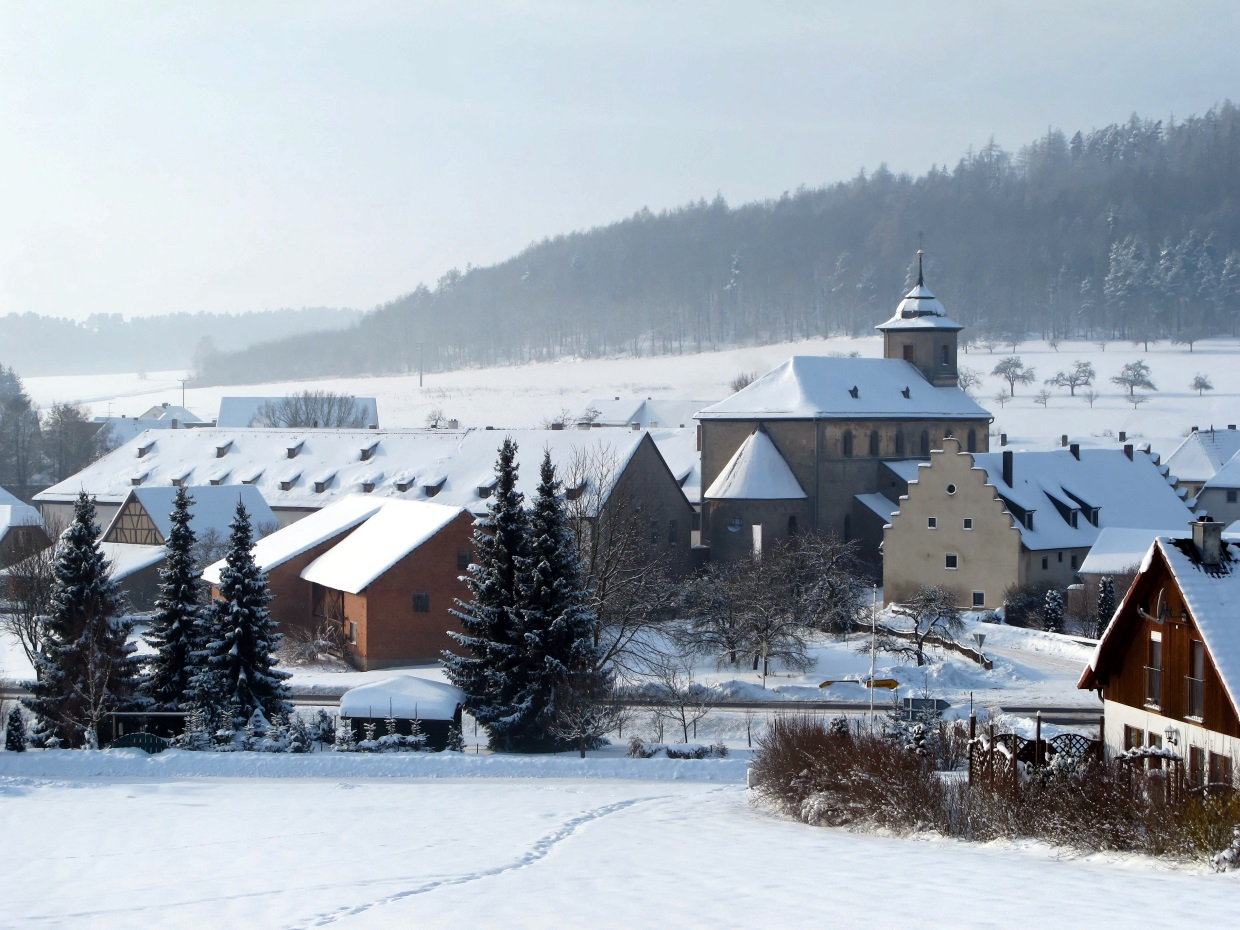
- Wechterswinkel Abbey

- Coat of arms

- Location of Bastheim within Rhön-Grabfeld district
- Interactive map of Bastheim
- Location within Germany Location within Bavaria
- Coordinates: 50°24′N 10°12′E
- Country: Germany
- State: Bavaria
- Admin. region: Unterfranken
- District: Rhön-Grabfeld
- Municipal assoc.: Mellrichstadt

Government
  - Mayor (2020–26): Tobias Seufert

Area
  - Total: 41.75 km^{2} (16.12 sq mi)
- Elevation: 284 m (932 ft)

Population (2025-12-31)
  - Total: 1,976
  - Density: 47.33/km^{2} (122.6/sq mi)
- Time zone: UTC+01:00 (CET)
  - Summer (DST): UTC+02:00 (CEST)
- Postal codes: 97654
- Dialling codes: 09773 - 09775
- Vehicle registration: NES
- Website: www.bastheim.de

Bastheim is a municipality in the district of Rhön-Grabfeld in Bavaria in Germany. Wechterswinkel Abbey stands in the village of Wechterswinkel, part of Bastheim.
