= Wollbach, Lower Franconia =

Wollbach
- Municipality
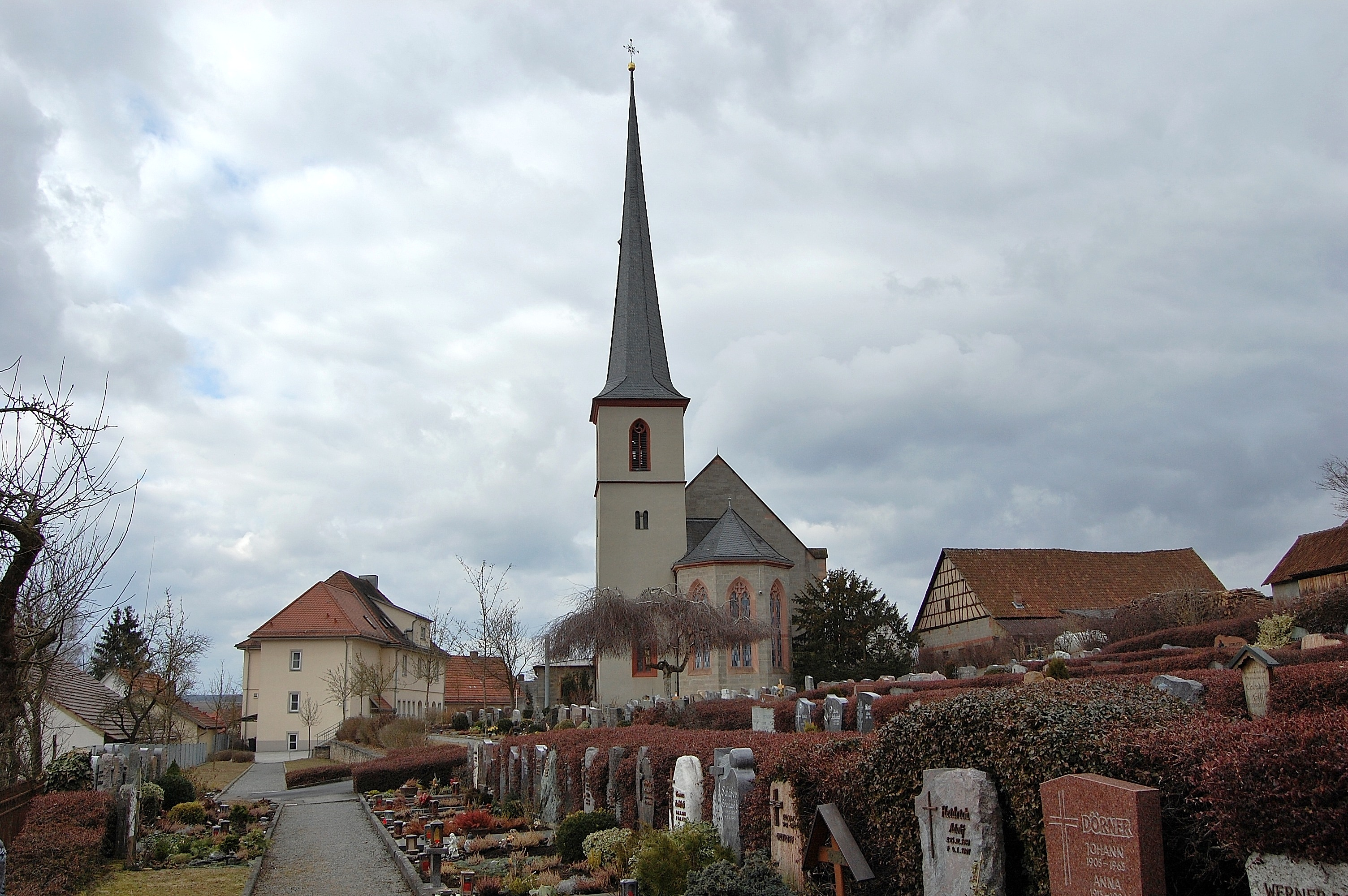
- Church of Saint Boniface

- Coat of arms

- Location of Wollbach within Rhön-Grabfeld district
- Interactive map of Wollbach
- Location within Germany Location within Bavaria
- Coordinates: 50°21′57″N 10°13′25″E
- Country: Germany
- State: Bavaria
- Admin. region: Lower Franconia
- District: Rhön-Grabfeld
- Municipal assoc.: Heustreu

Government
  - Mayor (2020–26): Thomas Bruckmüller (CSU)

Area
  - Total: 7.58 km^{2} (2.93 sq mi)
- Elevation: 266 m (873 ft)

Population (2025-12-31)
  - Total: 1,404
  - Density: 185/km^{2} (480/sq mi)
- Time zone: UTC+01:00 (CET)
  - Summer (DST): UTC+02:00 (CEST)
- Postal codes: 97618
- Dialling codes: 09773
- Vehicle registration: NES
- Website: www.wollbach.de

Wollbach is a municipality in the district of Rhön-Grabfeld in Bavaria in Germany.
