= Mellrichstadt =

- Town
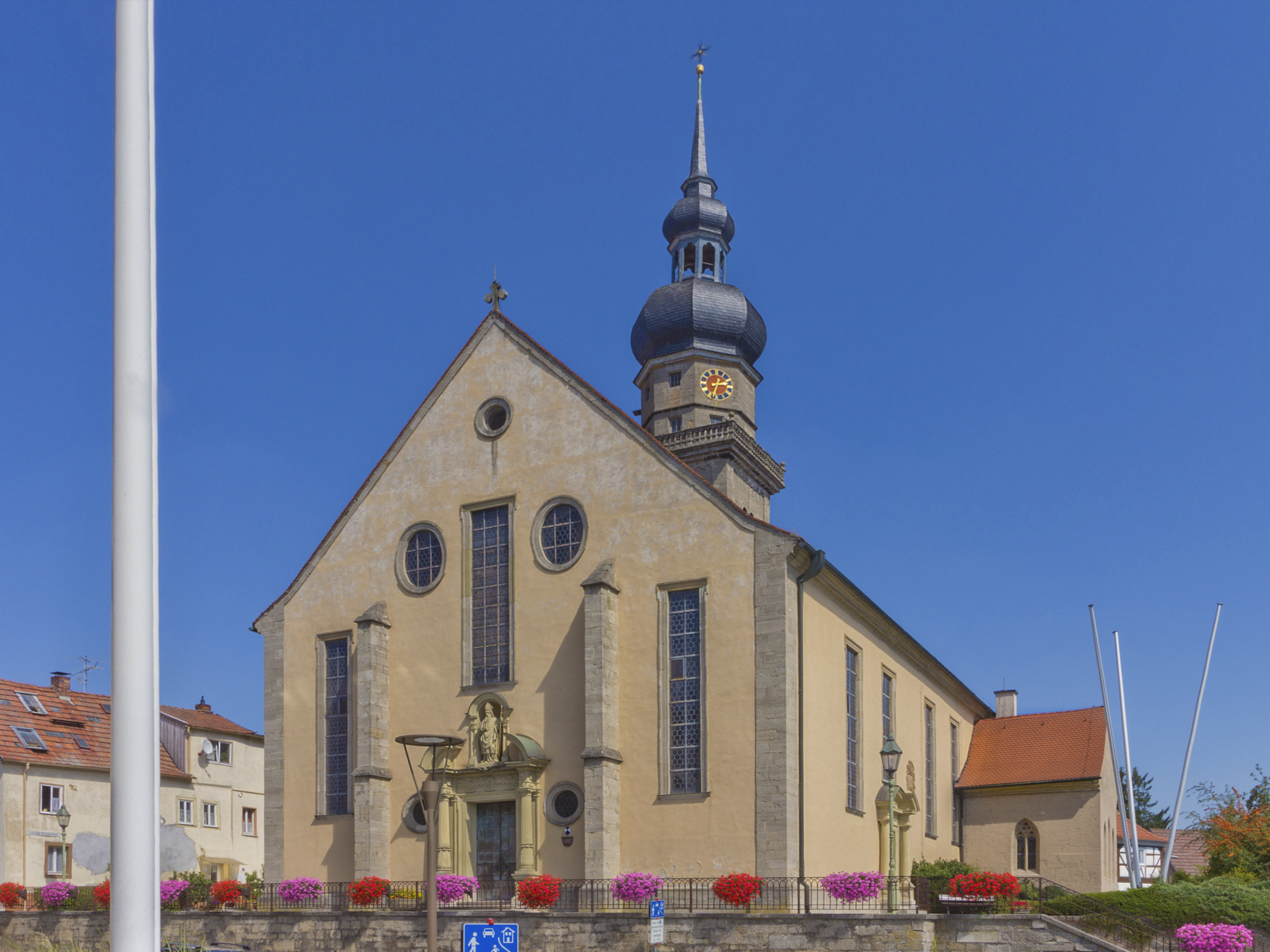
- Church of Saint Kilian

- Coat of arms

- Location of Mellrichstadt within Rhön-Grabfeld district
- Interactive map of Mellrichstadt
- Location within Germany Location within Bavaria
- Coordinates: 50°25′N 10°19′E
- Country: Germany
- State: Bavaria
- Admin. region: Unterfranken
- District: Rhön-Grabfeld
- Municipal assoc.: Mellrichstadt

Government
  - Mayor (2020–26): Michael Kraus

Area
  - Total: 55.99 km^{2} (21.62 sq mi)
- Elevation: 270 m (890 ft)

Population (2025-12-31)
  - Total: 5,458
  - Density: 97.48/km^{2} (252.5/sq mi)
- Time zone: UTC+01:00 (CET)
  - Summer (DST): UTC+02:00 (CEST)
- Postal codes: 97638
- Dialling codes: 09776
- Vehicle registration: NES, KÖN, MET
- Website: www.mellrichstadt.de

Mellrichstadt (German pronunciation: [ˈmɛlʁɪçˌʃtat]) is a town in the district Rhön-Grabfeld, in Bavaria, Germany. It is situated 17 km southwest of Meiningen, and 13 km northeast of Bad Neustadt. It includes the following villages: Bahra, Eußenhausen, Frickenhausen, Mühlfeld, Sondheim im Grabfeld und Roßrieth.

== History ==
Mellrichstadt has a history dating back to the Middle Ages. The town was first documented in 751 AD in a deed of gift from a Frankish nobleman, confirming its status as one of the oldest settlements in the region of Franconia. It received its town rights around 1230, establishing its significance as a trading center.

On September 30, 1938, the town's synagogue was destroyed, purportedly due to a mob of Sudeten Germans breaking into the synagogue. No members of the congregation were recorded as being harmed, as they were given warning beforehand by an unknown source.

During the Cold War, Mellrichstadt was located close to the Inner German border. A mechanized battalion and an anti-tank company of the Bundeswehr's 35th Panzergrenadier Brigade were stationed there, with the military installations serving as a key strategic point for border defense during the decades of German division.

== People ==
- Lorenz von Bibra (1459 – 6 February 1519), Prince-Bishop of the Bishopric of Würzburg
- Paulus Melissus (20 December 1539 – 3 February 1602), humanist Neo-Latin writer, translator and composer
- Karl Gotthelf von Hund (1722–1776), Founder and sponsor of Rite of Strict Observance in Germany (buried in the church St. Kilian)
- Franziska Streitel (24 November 1844 – 6 March 1911), German religious sister in the Roman Catholic Church
- Wilhelm Heinz Schröder (born 24 May 1946), is a German historian
- Tobias Rausch (born 1993), politician

== Literature ==
- Michael Müller: Der Bezirk Mellrichstadt, Gau, Cent, Amt und Gemeinde beschrieben. Würzburg 1879.
- Congressional Record (81 congress, first session), speech of Fred Marshall, Washington 7 july 1949 (about refugees from East Germany)
- Features in John Douglas-Gray's thriller 'The Novak Legacy' ISBN 978-0-7552-1321-4
