= Streu (Franconian Saale) =

River in Germany

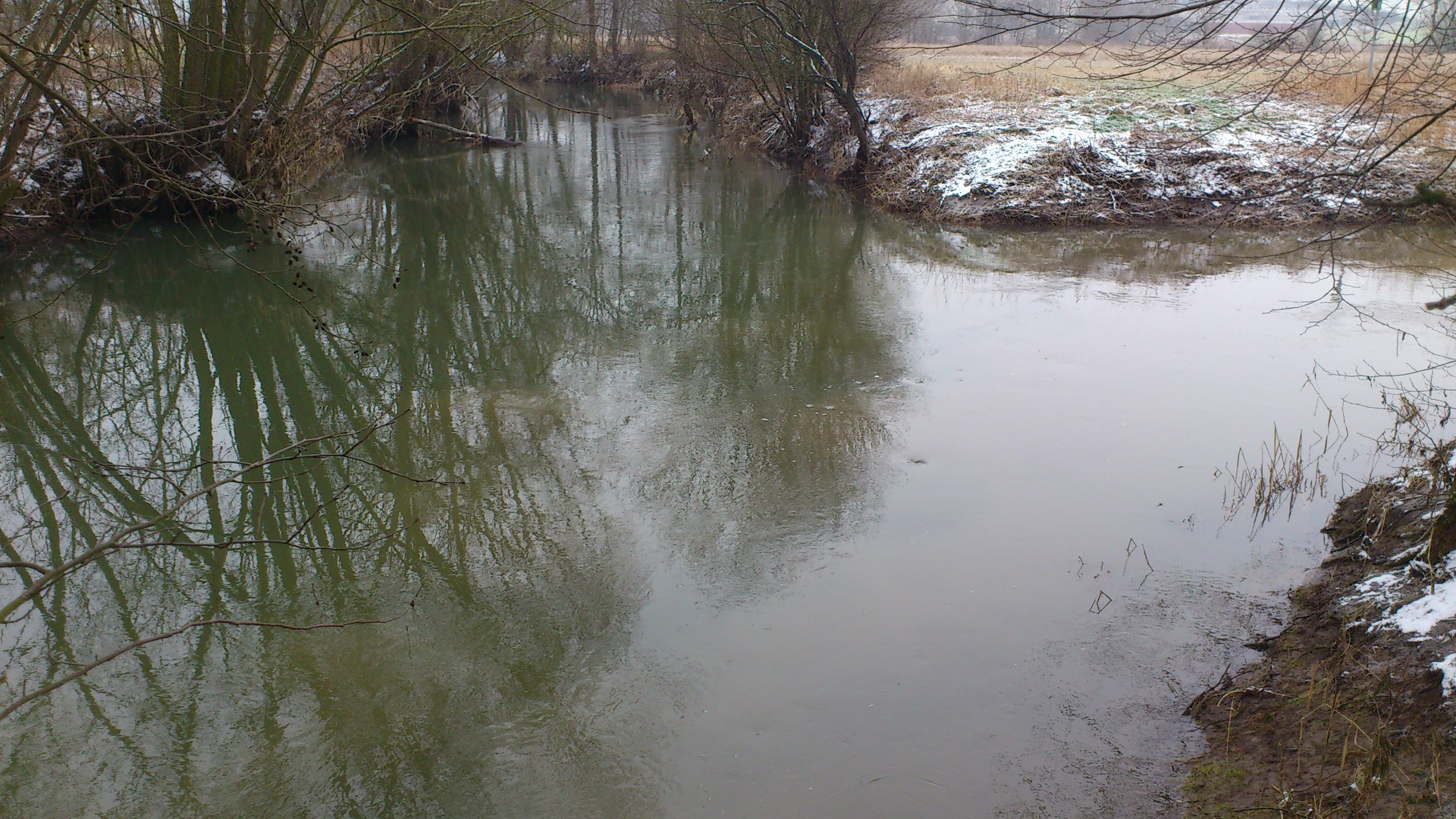
- The Streu (from the background) flows into the Franconian Saale (from right to the foreground)

Location
- Country: Germany
- States: Thuringia and Bavaria

Physical characteristics
- Source
  - location: Rhön Mountains, north of Fladungen
  - elevation: approx. 740 m (2,430 ft)
- Mouth
  - location: in the Franconian Saale near Bad Neustadt
  - coordinates: 50.3438°N 10.2563°E
  - elevation: 230 m (750 ft)
- Length: 41.9 km (26.0 mi)
- Basin size: 448 km^{2} (173 sq mi)

Basin features
- Progression: Franconian Saale→ Main→ Rhine→ North Sea

The Streu is a river of Thuringia and Bavaria, Germany.

The Streu arises in Thuringian part of the Rhön Mountains, below the Ellenbogen mountain, northwest of Melpers. It flows southeast for about 29 km (18 mi) through Ostheim to Mellrichstadt, then flows southwest for another 13 km (8.1 mi) to join the Franconian Saale at Heustreu near Bad Neustadt. From Fladungen to Mellrichstadt the Streu proceed through a valley, 2–4 km (1.2–2.5 mi) wide, between low hills. This region is known locally as the Streutal.

The Streu is too small and shallow for navigation but its lower reaches below Mellrichstadt are suitable for light boating and kayaking. The Streu occasionally floods, especially in spring when the snow melts on the Rhön Mountains. These floods are not generally destructive in the Streutal, but can contribute to more serious flooding downstream on the Franconian Saale.

== See also ==
- List of rivers of Thuringia
- List of rivers of Bavaria
