= Ostheim (disambiguation) =

Ostheim is a town in Northern Bavaria, Germany. Ostheim may also refer to:

== Localities ==
=== Current ===
- Ostheim (Cologne), Germany
- Ostheim, Haut-Rhin, France
- Ostheim Fortress Church

=== Former ===
- Großostheim, Germany
- Boikivske (also known as Telmanove), Ukraine

== People ==
- Herbert Schmidt Ostheim
- Emil Marschalk von Ostheim
