= Sondheim (disambiguation) =

Stephen Sondheim (1930–2021) was an American stage musical and film composer and lyricist.

Sondheim may also refer to:

- Sondheim (surname)
- Stephen Sondheim Theatre, a Broadway theatre in New York City named for the composer since 2010
- Sondheim Theatre, a theatre in the West End of London named for the composer since 2019
- Sondheim vor der Rhön, Bavaria, Germany
