= Newman, California =

City in California, United States

City of Newman
- City
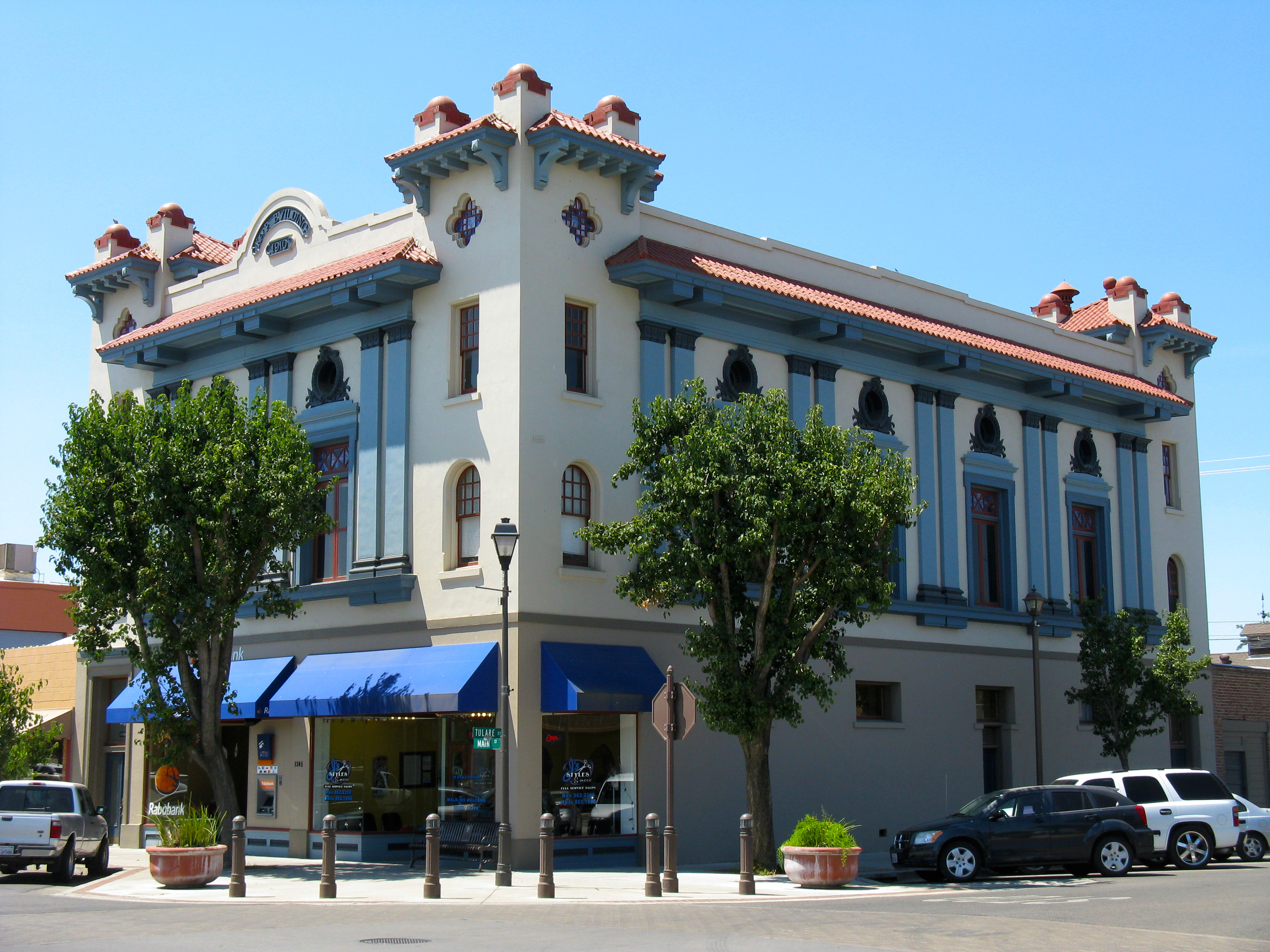
- Knights of Pythias Building
- Interactive map of City of Newman
- Location in the United States
- Coordinates: 37°18′54″N 121°1′21″W
- Country: United States
- State: California
- County: Stanislaus
- Incorporated: June 10, 1908

Area
  - Total: 2.06 sq mi (5.34 km^{2})
  - Land: 2.06 sq mi (5.34 km^{2})
  - Water: 0 sq mi (0.00 km^{2}) 0%
- Elevation: 89 ft (27 m)

Population (2020)
  - Total: 12,351
  - Density: 5,712.4/sq mi (2,205.56/km^{2})
- Time zone: UTC-8 (Pacific (PST))
  - Summer (DST): UTC-7 (PDT)
- ZIP code: 95360
- Area code: 209
- FIPS code: 06-51140
- GNIS feature ID: 0277563
- Website: www.cityofnewman.com

Newman is a city in Stanislaus County, California, United States, located in the San Joaquin Valley region of the greater Central Valley. The city has a population of 12,446 residents at the 2020 census, up from 10,224 at the 2010 census. Founded in 1888 by Simon Newman, the city is a largely agricultural community, known for its annual Fall Festival that takes place every year on Labor day weekend.

== History ==
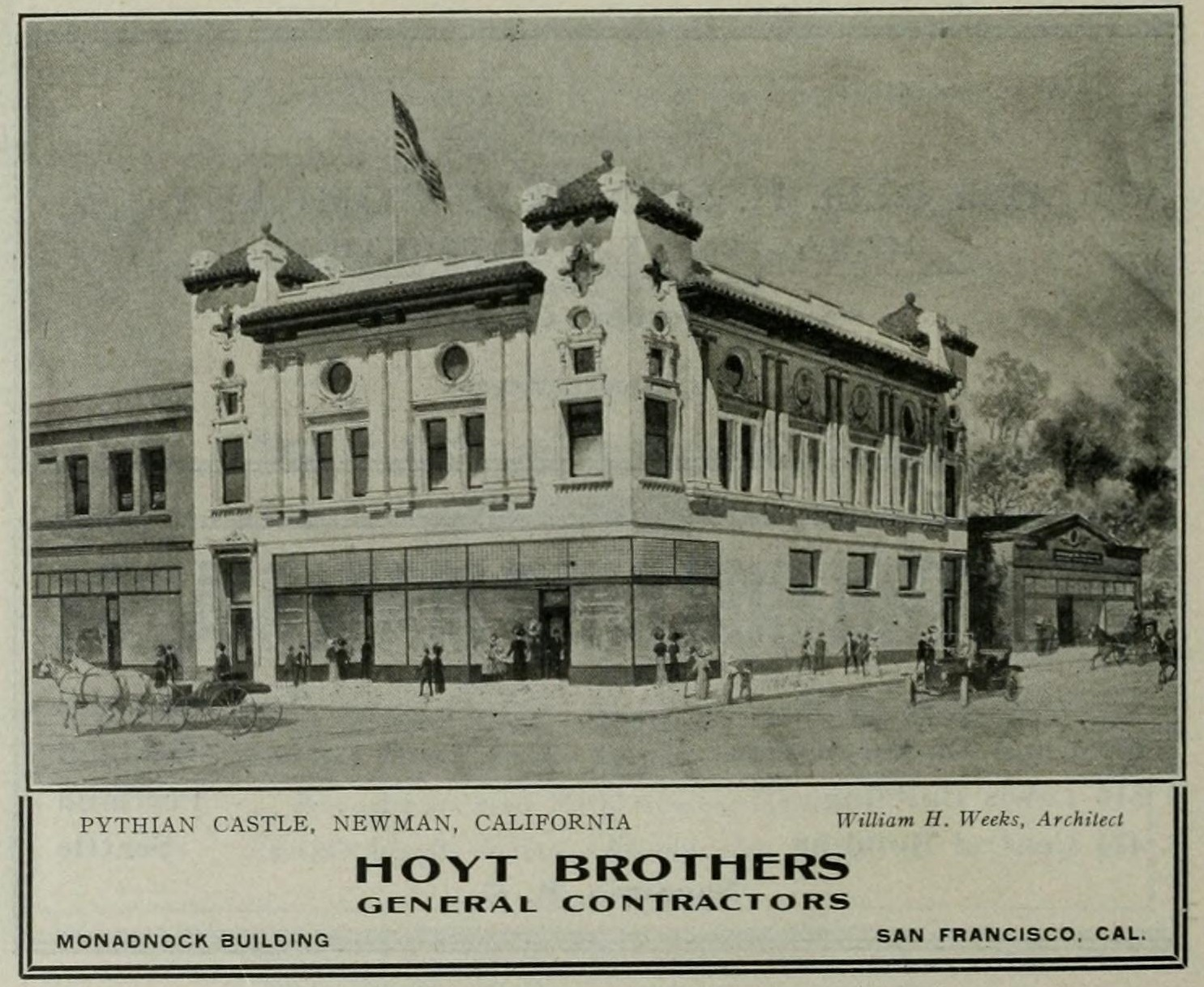
Knights of Pythias Building in 1911.

Simon Newman was born as Simon Neumann in Willmars, Bavaria, German Confederation in 1846. In 1862, the young Jew decided to emigrate to California, where his sister Fanny Wangenheim had already lived. Initially speaking only German and Hebrew, he then learned English and translated his family name to Newman. After becoming a successful businessman, he founded the town of Newman in 1888.

== Geography ==
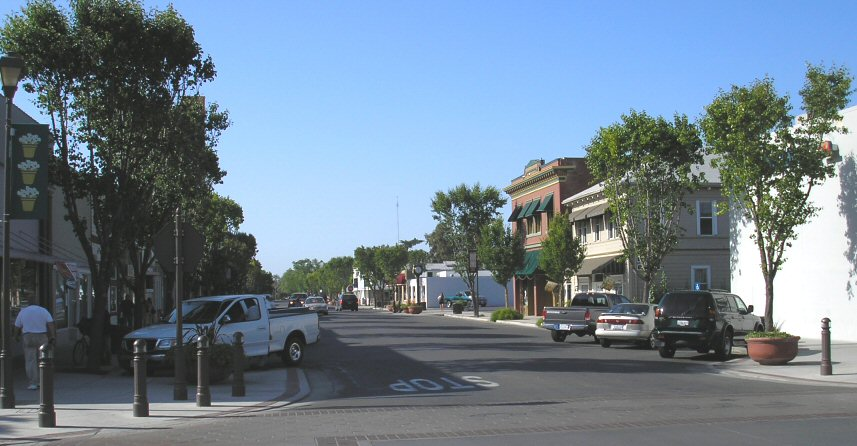
View of Main Street.

Newman is located at 37°18′54″N 121°1′21″W (37.315038, −121.022476) According to the United States Census Bureau, the city has a total area of 2.1 square miles (5.4 km^{2}), all land. Newman currently has a population of over 10,000. Newman is located on California State Route 33 between the towns of Gustine and Crows Landing. Interstate 5 is located a few miles to the west of the city.

=== Climate ===
Newman has a semi-arid climate (Köppen: BSh) with Mediterranean influences, characterized by hot, dry and humid summers and cool winters.

Climate data for Newman, California, 1991–2020 normals, extremes 1902–present
Month	Jan	Feb	Mar	Apr	May	Jun	Jul	Aug	Sep	Oct	Nov	Dec	Year
Record high °F (°C)	79 (26)	85 (29)	96 (36)	101 (38)	111 (44)	113 (45)	116 (47)	114 (46)	112 (44)	105 (41)	95 (35)	82 (28)	116 (47)
Mean maximum °F (°C)	68.4 (20.2)	74.1 (23.4)	83.2 (28.4)	92.5 (33.6)	100.3 (37.9)	106.4 (41.3)	107.1 (41.7)	105.7 (40.9)	102.9 (39.4)	96.0 (35.6)	81.0 (27.2)	68.8 (20.4)	108.5 (42.5)
Mean daily maximum °F (°C)	60.1 (15.6)	66.6 (19.2)	73.0 (22.8)	79.7 (26.5)	88.0 (31.1)	95.7 (35.4)	100.0 (37.8)	98.2 (36.8)	94.9 (34.9)	85.1 (29.5)	70.7 (21.5)	60.4 (15.8)	81.0 (27.2)
Daily mean °F (°C)	49.2 (9.6)	53.7 (12.1)	58.3 (14.6)	63.0 (17.2)	70.1 (21.2)	76.6 (24.8)	80.8 (27.1)	79.3 (26.3)	76.1 (24.5)	67.5 (19.7)	56.5 (13.6)	49.1 (9.5)	65.0 (18.3)
Mean daily minimum °F (°C)	38.2 (3.4)	40.8 (4.9)	43.6 (6.4)	46.3 (7.9)	52.1 (11.2)	57.5 (14.2)	61.6 (16.4)	60.4 (15.8)	57.3 (14.1)	50.0 (10.0)	42.4 (5.8)	37.8 (3.2)	49.0 (9.4)
Mean minimum °F (°C)	27.2 (−2.7)	30.8 (−0.7)	33.6 (0.9)	35.2 (1.8)	40.8 (4.9)	47.5 (8.6)	52.6 (11.4)	52.5 (11.4)	47.4 (8.6)	39.5 (4.2)	31.6 (−0.2)	26.9 (−2.8)	24.7 (−4.1)
Record low °F (°C)	15 (−9)	19 (−7)	20 (−7)	15 (−9)	30 (−1)	37 (3)	41 (5)	34 (1)	35 (2)	27 (−3)	17 (−8)	15 (−9)	15 (−9)
Average precipitation inches (mm)	2.66 (68)	2.23 (57)	1.76 (45)	0.71 (18)	0.45 (11)	0.07 (1.8)	trace	trace	0.04 (1.0)	0.59 (15)	1.06 (27)	2.14 (54)	11.71 (297)
Average precipitation days (≥ 0.01 in)	11.4	9.8	7.8	4.4	2.4	0.6	0.1	0.1	0.6	2.8	5.6	9.0	54.6
Source: NOAA

== Demographics ==
Historical population
Census	Pop.	Note	%±
1890	621		—
1910	892		—
1920	1,251		40.2%
1930	1,269		1.4%
1940	1,214		−4.3%
1950	1,815		49.5%
1960	2,148		18.3%
1970	2,505		16.6%
1980	2,785		11.2%
1990	4,151		49.0%
2000	7,093		70.9%
2010	10,224		44.1%
2020	12,351		20.8%
U.S. Decennial Census

=== 2020 census ===
As of the 2020 census, Newman had a population of 12,351 and a population density of 5,986.9 inhabitants per square mile (2,311.6/km^{2}). The median age was 32.4 years. The age distribution was 30.5% under the age of 18, 9.6% aged 18 to 24, 27.0% aged 25 to 44, 21.7% aged 45 to 64, and 11.3% who were 65 years of age or older. For every 100 females there were 97.5 males, and for every 100 females age 18 and over there were 94.3 males age 18 and over.

The census reported that 99.6% of the population lived in households and 0.4% were institutionalized. 99.9% of residents lived in urban areas, while 0.1% lived in rural areas.

There were 3,642 households, of which 50.7% had children under the age of 18 living in them. Of all households, 57.3% were married-couple households, 7.2% were cohabiting couple households, 21.6% had a female householder with no spouse or partner present, and 13.9% had a male householder with no spouse or partner present. About 15.5% of households were one person, and 7.6% had someone living alone who was 65 years of age or older. The average household size was 3.38. There were 2,921 families (80.2% of all households).

There were 3,739 housing units at an average density of 1,812.4 units per square mile (699.8 units/km^{2}). Of all housing units, 3,642 (97.4%) were occupied and 2.6% were vacant. Of the occupied units, 66.0% were owner-occupied and 34.0% were occupied by renters. The homeowner vacancy rate was 0.8% and the rental vacancy rate was 2.3%.

Racial composition as of the 2020 census
Race	Number	Percent
White	4,405	35.7%
Black or African American	370	3.0%
American Indian and Alaska Native	260	2.1%
Asian	263	2.1%
Native Hawaiian and Other Pacific Islander	57	0.5%
Some other race	4,523	36.6%
Two or more races	2,473	20.0%
Hispanic or Latino (of any race)	8,407	68.1%

=== 2023 ACS estimates ===
In 2023, the US Census Bureau estimated that 23.1% of the population were foreign-born. Of all people aged 5 or older, 42.7% spoke only English at home, 51.9% spoke Spanish, 4.2% spoke other Indo-European languages, 1.2% spoke Asian or Pacific Islander languages, and 0.0% spoke other languages. Of those aged 25 or older, 75.7% were high school graduates and 8.5% had a bachelor's degree.

The median household income in 2023 was $75,344, and the per capita income was $28,662. About 14.4% of families and 13.3% of the population were below the poverty line.

=== 2010 census ===
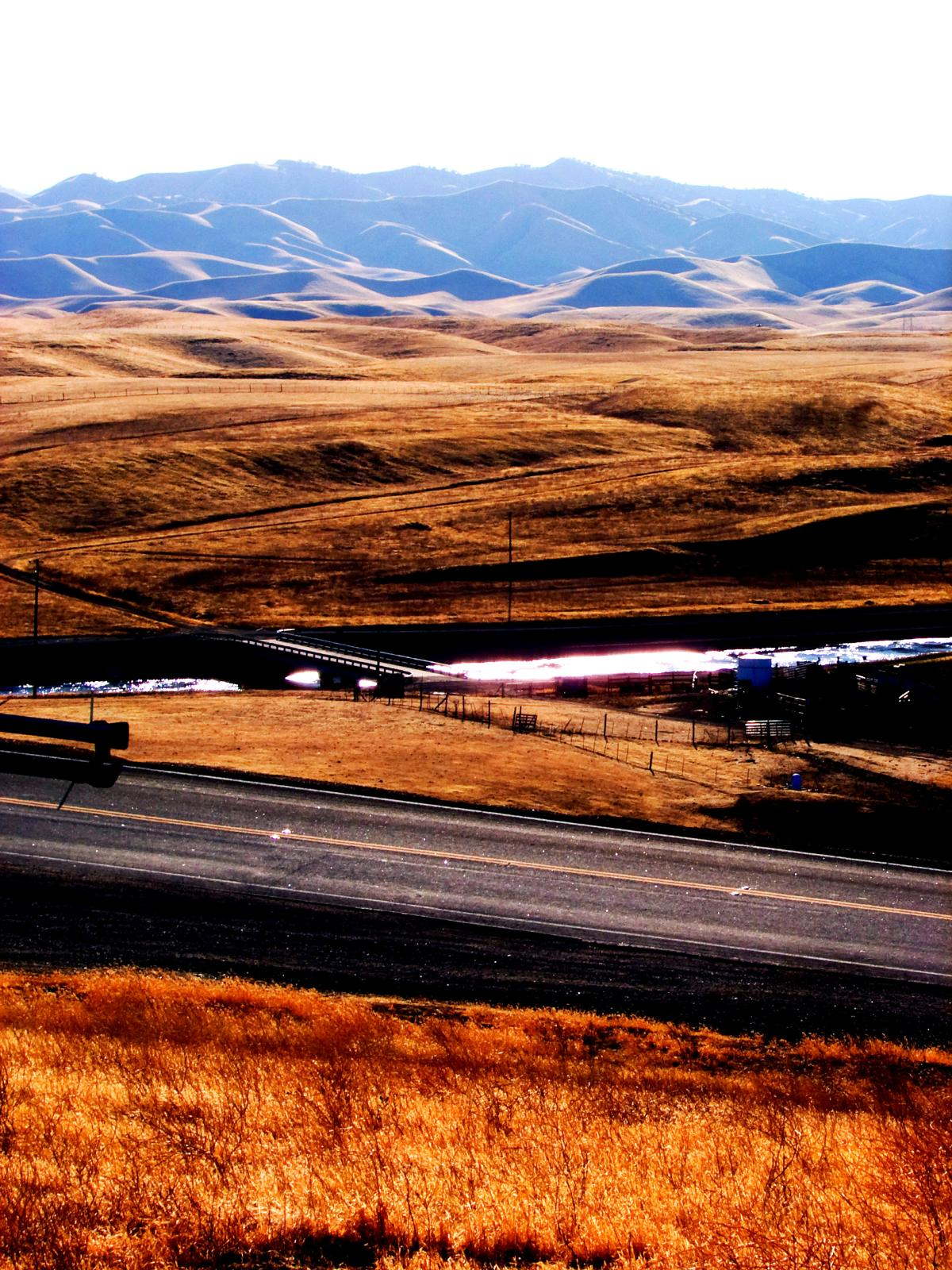
The landscape in Newman.

At the 2010 census Newman had a population of 10,224. The population density was 4,864.2 inhabitants per square mile (1,878.1/km^{2}). The racial makeup of Newman was 6,812 (66.6%) White, 234 (2.3%) African American, 106 (1.0%) Native American, 191 (1.9%) Asian, 40 (0.4%) Pacific Islander, 2,287 (22.4%) from other races, and 554 (5.4%) from two or more races. Hispanic or Latino of any race were 6,299 persons (61.6%).

The census reported that 10,158 people (99.4% of the population) lived in households, no one lived in non-institutionalized group quarters and 66 (0.6%) were institutionalized.

There were 3,006 households, 1,581 (52.6%) had children under the age of 18 living in them, 1,818 (60.5%) were opposite-sex married couples living together, 400 (13.3%) had a female householder with no husband present, 214 (7.1%) had a male householder with no wife present. There were 232 (7.7%) unmarried opposite-sex partnerships, and 16 (0.5%) same-sex married couples or partnerships. 466 households (15.5%) were one person and 174 (5.8%) had someone living alone who was 65 or older. The average household size was 3.38. There were 2,432 families (80.9% of households); the average family size was 3.75.

The age distribution was 3,317 people (32.4%) under the age of 18, 1,015 people (9.9%) aged 18 to 24, 2,773 people (27.1%) aged 25 to 44, 2,250 people (22.0%) aged 45 to 64, and 869 people (8.5%) who were 65 or older. The median age was 30.7 years. For every 100 females, there were 97.9 males. For every 100 females age 18 and over, there were 96.8 males.

There were 3,357 housing units at an average density of 1,597.2 per square mile, of the occupied units 2,002 (66.6%) were owner-occupied and 1,004 (33.4%) were rented. The homeowner vacancy rate was 5.9%; the rental vacancy rate was 6.9%. 6,685 people (65.4% of the population) lived in owner-occupied housing units and 3,473 people (34.0%) lived in rental housing units.

== Government ==
In the California State Legislature, Newman is in the 4th senatorial district, represented by Republican Marie Alvarado-Gil, and the 22nd Assembly district, represented by Republican Juan Alanis.

In the United States House of Representatives, Newman is in California's 13th congressional district, represented by Democrat Adam Gray.

The city is under a mandate from the county's Local Agency Formation Commission to adopt an agricultural land preservation strategy. The city could approve an urban growth limit policy that would establish the sphere of influence boundary lasting for 25 years.
