= Ostheim Fortress Church =

Church in Ostheim, Bavaria, Germany

Coordinates: 50.4595°N 10.2315°E

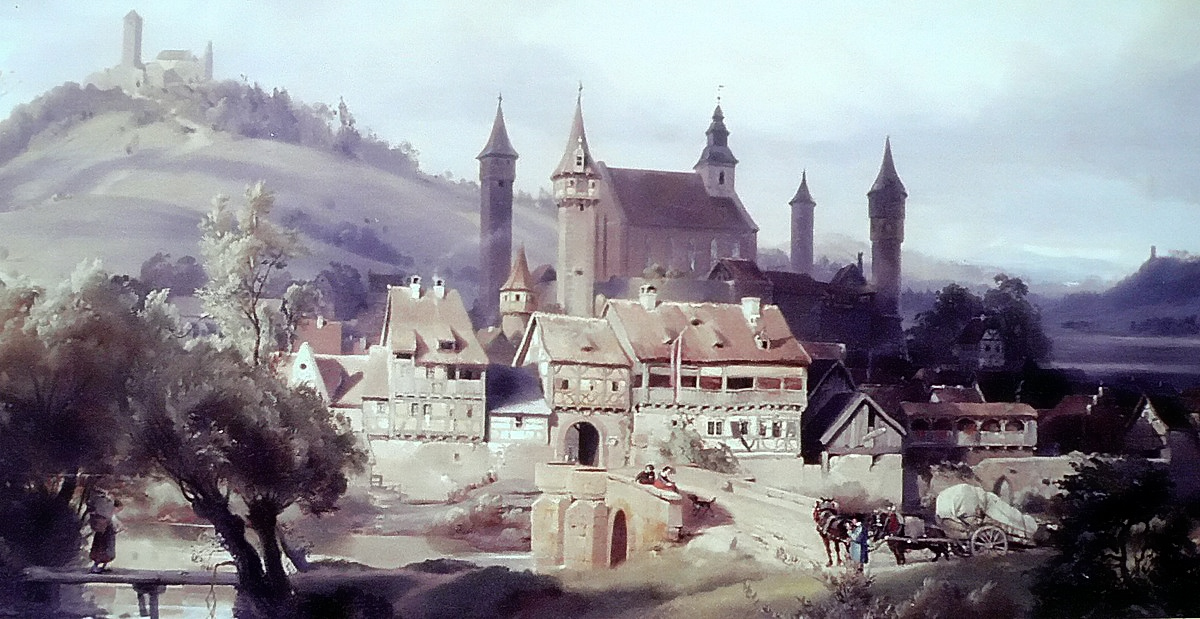
South view of Ostheim fortress church at the end of the 19th century - painting by Carl Maria Nicolaus Hummel

Ostheim Fortress Church is a fortress church located in the Lower Franconian town of Ostheim vor der Rhön in the Rhön-Grabfeld district. The church building of St. Michael there is located within a double ring wall built between 1400 and 1450 with a zwinger in between. The double ring wall has five defense towers and is reinforced with six bastions halfway along the wall. The Protestant church, built in the Renaissance style on the foundations of a predecessor church, dates from 1615 to 1619. Within the fortifications there are 66 vaulted cellars with 72 lofts, which served as protective dwellings in times of war and in which the local inhabitants kept their belongings safe in times of crisis. With a floor area of 75 by 75 meters, it is considered the largest and best-preserved fortress church in Germany. Some of the vaulted cellars are used by the local population as storage cellars.

== Location ==
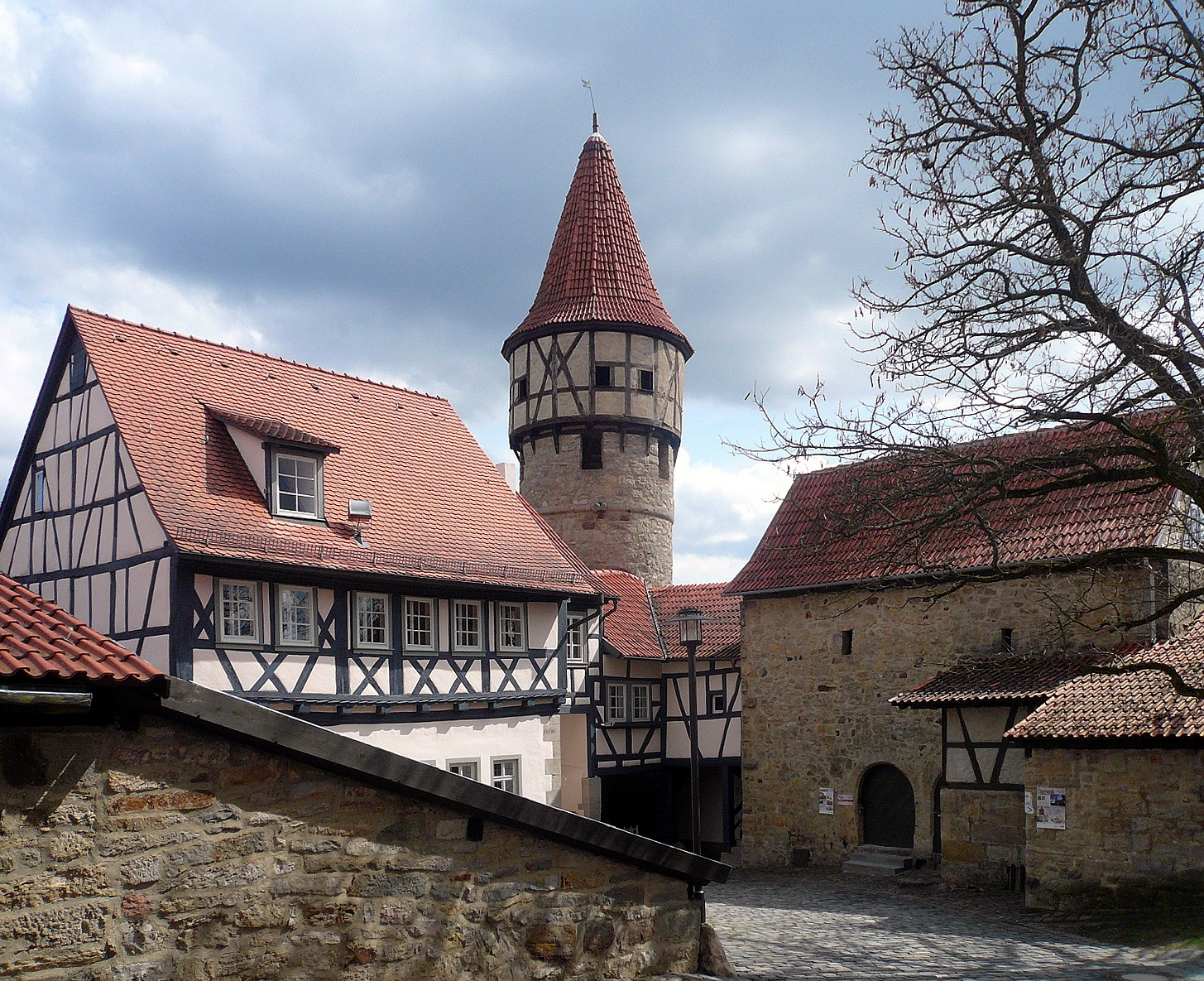
School building, Schulglockenturm and stone lofts

The fortress church is located on the northern outskirts of Ostheim. It stands on a plain that slopes slightly to the south towards the Streu, a right tributary of the Franconian Saale. At an altitude of 310 meters above sea level, it towers over the village by about 10 to 15 meters. It stands in the border area between the former domains of the bishops of Würzburg in the south, the abbots of Fulda in the west and the house of Henneberg in the north. During military conflicts, the population found safe shelter in the fortress church. It stands directly on route for commerce, the Ortesweg, which was already used in Celtic period, as well as on the Hohe Straße, the historical long-distance road from Fulda to Bamberg.

== Meaning ==
With an area of about 0.6 hectares, the fortress church is one of the largest in Germany. Comparable fortifications such as the fortress churches in the Thuringian towns of Walldorf and Rohr cover an area of about 0.3 to 0.4 hectares. Like no other fortress church in Germany, it is surrounded by a double ring wall with an interior Zwinger and several towers and bastions. The fortress church has been preserved except for the southwest side; all vaulted cellars and arcades are still accessible. The fortress church was declared a monument of national importance in 2003.

== History ==
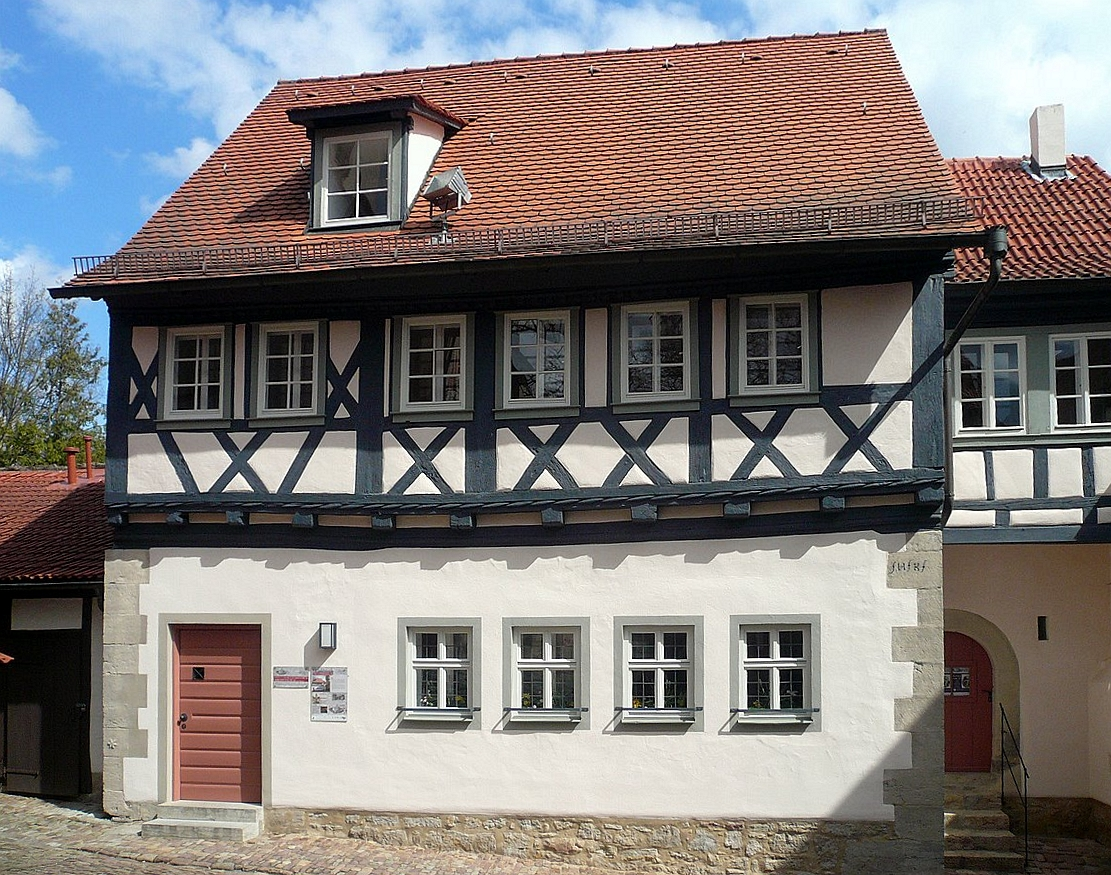
Former churchyard school

Ostheim with its fortress church and the surrounding region lay in a territorially fragmented area with frequent changes of ownership. From 1409 they belonged to the Electorate of Mainz, from 1423 to 1433 to the Prince-Bishopric of Würzburg. In 1433 the House of Henneberg-Römhild took over the Ostheim area, and from 1548 the House of Mansfeld. From 1555 the Duchy of Saxony ruled there, and from 1741 the Dukes of Saxe-Weimar-Eisenach. In 1920 Ostheim became part of the state of Thuringia, and in 1945 it became part of Bavaria. Since 1410 it has been ecclesiastically independent and received the town privileges in 1596. The nobility could retreat to Lichtenburg, two kilometers to the north, in case of warlike conflicts. The urban population in other places found protection behind a city wall, while the inhabitants of Ostheim faced the dangers of war without protection. The Ostheimers therefore protected themselves by strengthening and extending the church. The construction of the fortress church took place without the support of ecclesiastical or secular lords, and its later upkeep was also undertaken exclusively by the Ostheim citizens and peasants.

The first church Beatae Mariae Virginis was completed in 1419. It was located in an unfavorable place from the point of view of defense, since it was surrounded by flat terrain. To protect it, the first wall was built around the churchyard from 1417/1418. By 1450, a defensive wall with tall, slender towers was built at the corners. At the time of the Hussites invasions in the 1430s, a Zwinger and another outer wall were also built. In 1579 and 1580, due to the Ottoman wars in Europe, the complex was further expanded. A complete tower-fortified outer wall with the intervening Zwinger was built. Muzzle embrasures for arqhebus were added to the towers of the inner wall. The north side was strengthened by a further, centrally located round tower.

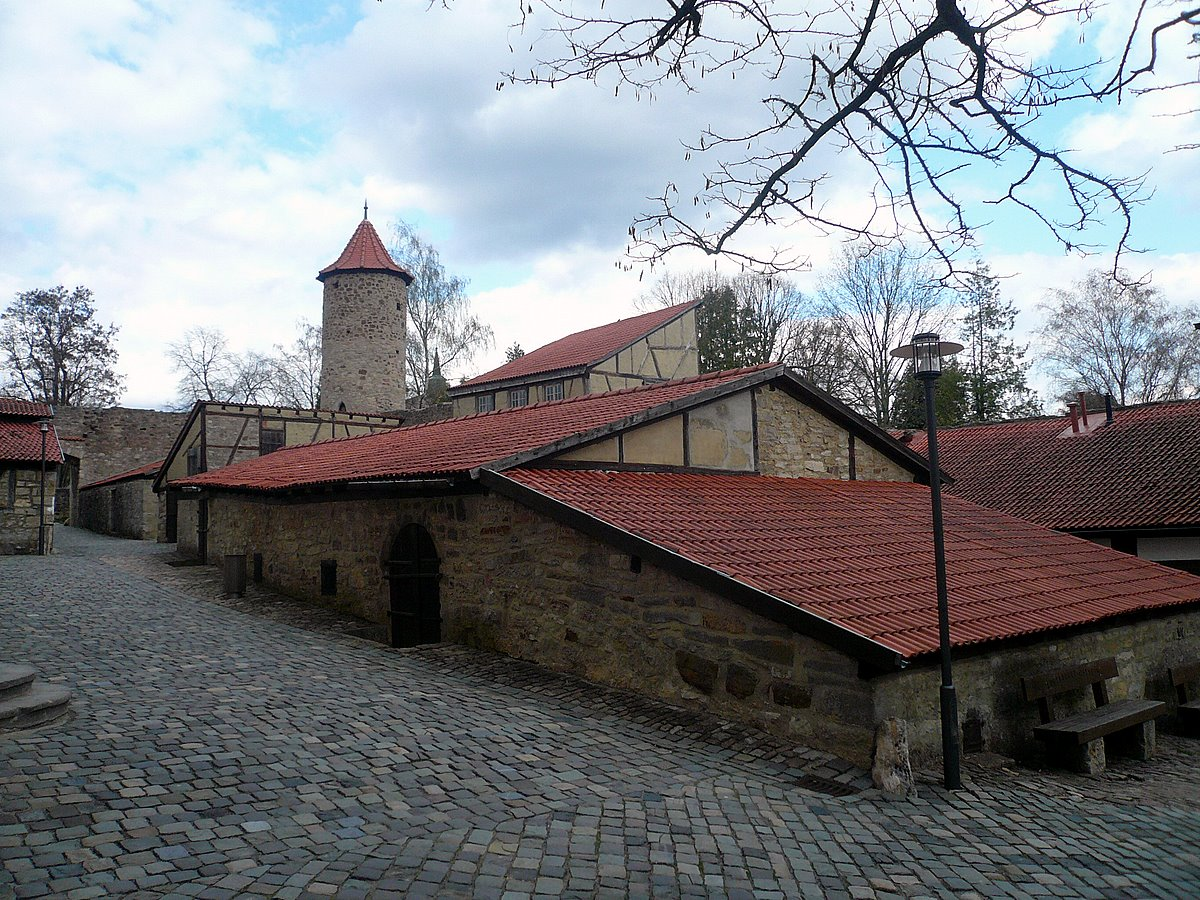
Eastern lofts and Pulverturm

In the years 1589 to 1620 a new church was built in the same place, as the previous one had become too small for the town population. In 1634, during the Croatian invasion in the Thirty Years' War, there were warlike conflicts. Ten citizens defended the fortress church with hooked rifles, but had to surrender the castle to avoid burning down the town. The fortress church was looted, but not destroyed.

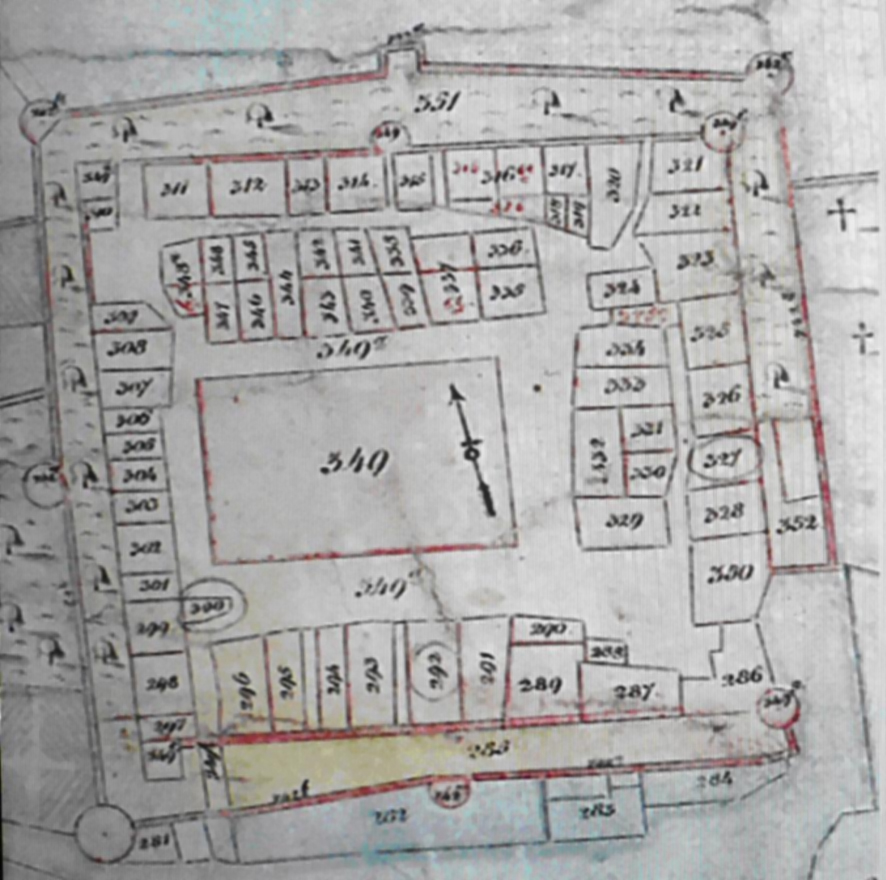
Cadastral plan from 1830/31

Within the fortification walls there are storehouses (lofts) with vaulted cellars underneath with predominantly arched doors, some of which are marked with dates. Thus, individual gaden can be dated to 1547, 1575, 1576, 1855 and 1864. By connecting the gaden to the outside of the inner wall, an additional circumferential protective wall was created. Most of the gaden consist of brick cellars with barrel vaults and hut-like superstructures above. The first floors are mostly made of quarry stone, the upper floors are half-timbered. Root vegetable, fruit, must, and from about 1780 potatoes, and sometimes also valuables were stored in the lofts. Since the lofts underwent numerous alterations and extensions in the course of time, the roofs have unequal heights and the roofs have different roof coverings. In the course of building renovations and building preservation, the gaden were partially unified.

Since in the course of the 19th century, the fortress church had lost its defense significance, it was not further expanded, but only renovated. In the 19th century, a breakthrough was made in both sets of walls to the north of the church as a further means of access. During the great town fire in 1878, the fortress church was also damaged. In 1935 and 1936 the wooden tower rooms of the corner towers were renewed. The church was renovated in 1960 and 1961. The ceiling painting was colorfully reconstructed; the wall frescoes on the south and west sides were uncovered. On the east side, two small galleries, one above the other, were removed and the painting of the parapets of the other galleries was renewed.

After the acquisition of the loft by the city of Ostheim, the church castle was extensively renovated in 1982. Further thorough renovations of the fortress church and the church were carried out in 2002 and 2003. In the summer of 2008, the museum Lebendige Kirchenburg was opened opposite the entrance gate. It shows on three floors the history of the Ostheim fortress church and others in the Franconian and Thuringian regions.

== Description ==
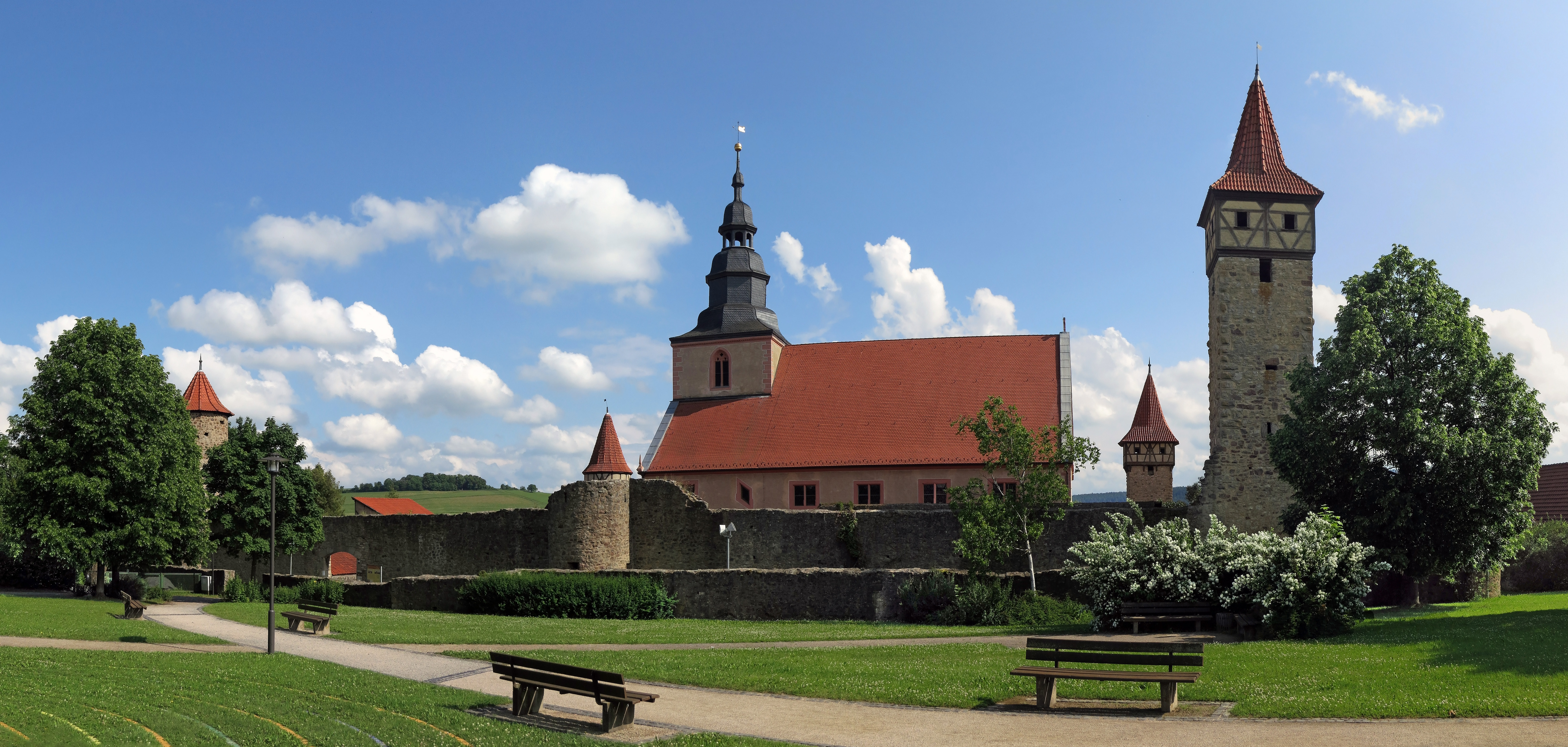
Fortress church, north view

Floor plan of the fortress church: 1. Church2. Churchyard3. Main wall4. Schulglockenturm 5. Waagglockenturm6. Achtlöchriger Turm7. Pulverturm8. Schalenturm9. Gate / 10. Modern gate11. Side loft12. Zwinger13. Zwinger tower14. School15. Stone loft16. Loft17. Cemetery18. Broken off components

The fortress church is surrounded by two rings of walls and has a rectangular ground plan. The inner area measures 60 by 60 meters and is enclosed by a wall six to eight meters high. At each corner of the wall ring there is a corner tower about 25 meters high. The two eastern towers are round, the two western towers have a rectangular ground plan. The towers are each 66 meters apart. In the middle of the northern boundary wall there is a circular bastion as reinforcement. Around the inner wall runs a 7.5-meter-wide Zwinger. The outer wall is five meters high, has tower-like corner bastions and another bastion on each of the long sides. No longer preserved is a round bastion on the east side of the outer wall. At the southwest corner is a fifth defense tower. A sixth defense tower at the southeast corner of the outer wall has also not survived. Foundations of this tower were found during construction works in 1911. The part of the eastern wall adjoining the tower was also demolished.

In the Zwinger there were battlements, which are only preserved on the south side. The defense walls made of rubble are plastered in places. At the time of the construction of the fortress church, fighting was done with bows and crossbows, so vertical slit embrasures were added for the crossbowmen. Horizontal embrasures were used in later times for the use of small arms. However, the military use of the complex increasingly receded into the background.

The outer walls are abutted by the partially preserved city fortification walls. The fortress church was accessible from the southeast corner through a round-arched entrance gate with a portcullis. In front of it was a fortification ditch, which enclosed the entire complex. In later years, the moat was filled in and another entrance from the outside was broken through the northern parts of the wall.

The lofts of the fortress church stand mostly close to the inner side of the inner wall belt, in the northern and eastern part they also stand free. They have one or two floors and are accessible through partly narrow alleys and via several staircases. To the south of the fortress church there are cellars, some vaulted and some carved into the rock, which reach under the southern bailey. In case of imminent attacks, the inhabitants of Ostheim withdrew with their most important belongings and supplies and part of the livestock to the fortress church, where they found temporary shelter. The cellars and loft housed people, livestock and supplies. In peacetime, they were used for storage, and usually one loft with a cellar was owned by one family. Sometimes several families shared one loft. In the cellars, temperatures remained almost constant in summer and winter. This kept the stored goods fresh for a long time. After the harvest, cereal, hay, must, root vegerable or wine were stored. Wine and fruit were stored in the dark, evenly tempered cellars, hay and grain in the upper floors.

The town parish church stands in the middle of the fortress church. Next to the gatehouse is the former churchyard school, which now houses a natural history museum. The entrance gate of the fortress church is located near the southeastern corner point on the eastern wall within the Ostheim town wall. The round-arched gate is still preserved in its original condition. It bears the date 1622 on an iron-barred gate wing, in which a small doorway for passenger traffic is also built in. Hookstones served a wind-up portcullis. The churchyard school was a Latin school in the 16th century, later a girls' school. The teacher's apartment was located on the half-timbered floor. There is documentary evidence that the building was used as a school in Ostheim since the middle of the 16th century. In the 19th century the building was rebuilt several times. Around 1980, the building was rebuilt for the last time and thoroughly renovated. Today, changing exhibitions are shown there. The Steingaden was added to the fortification wall in 1466 and 1467 and is a part of the extensive gaden and cellar complexes within the fortification. The building, constructed of quarry stones, has two round-arched portals and several slit windows and was rebuilt in 1560 and 1664.

=== Church ===
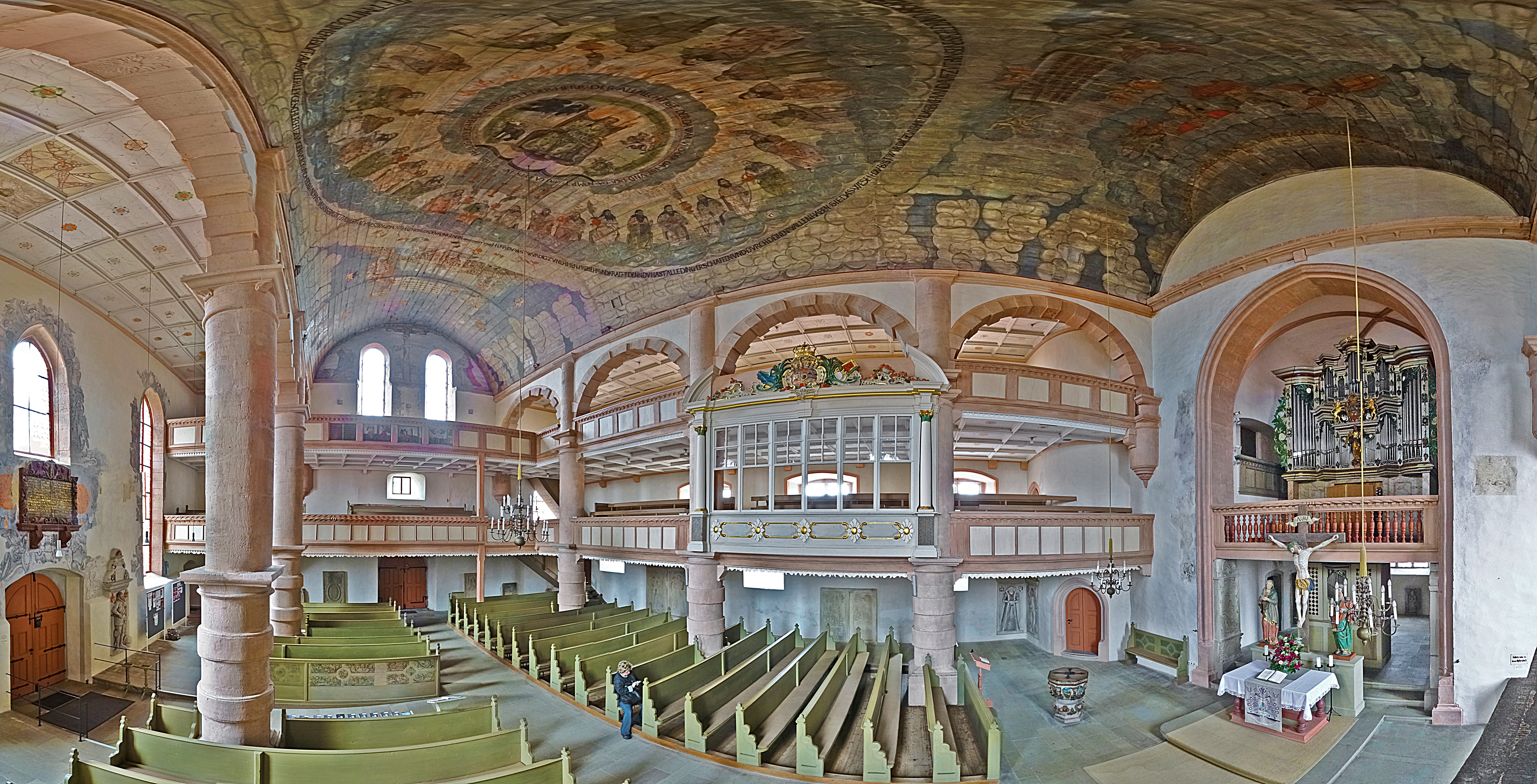
Interior panorama

The old church from the 15th century, walled in 1589 on the east, west and north, was demolished in 1615 except for the tower. The present church was built in the same place from 1615 to 1620. It is one of the earliest Protestant town churches in central Germany. The tower on the east side, which sits on top of the nave, was built in 1579 and 1580 and replaced a predecessor with a wooden tower on the same site. The tower bears one of the earliest Welsh hoods in the region, has ogival windows, and towers above the fortification towers. Two ashlars on the southeast corner of the tower floor bear the date 1579 and the names of Johann Schultheiss, the priest in office from 1575 to 1591, and Conrad Zinn, the mayor. Both are depicted on the south facade of the church in profile facing each other.

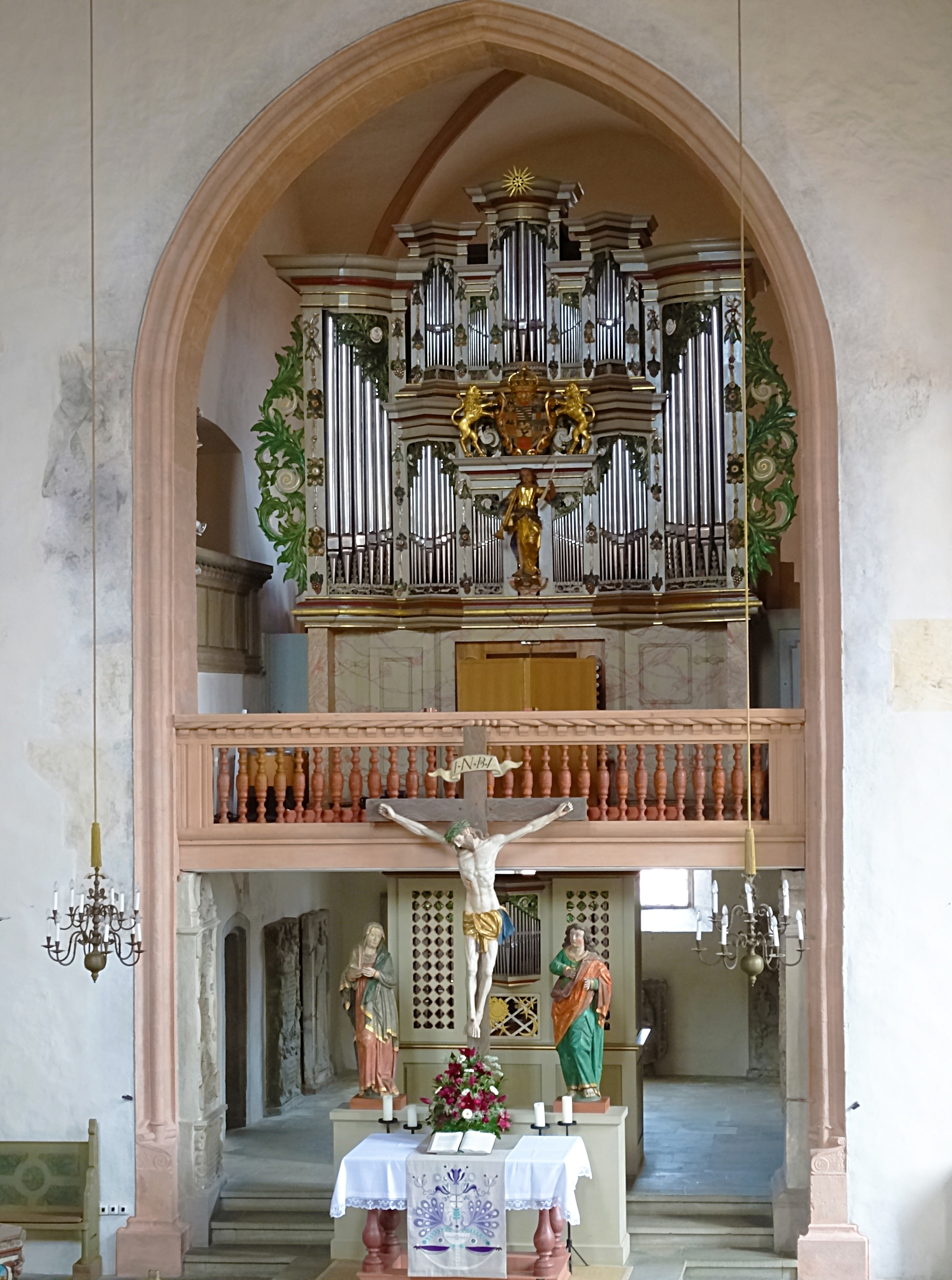
Choir with altar and organ from 1738

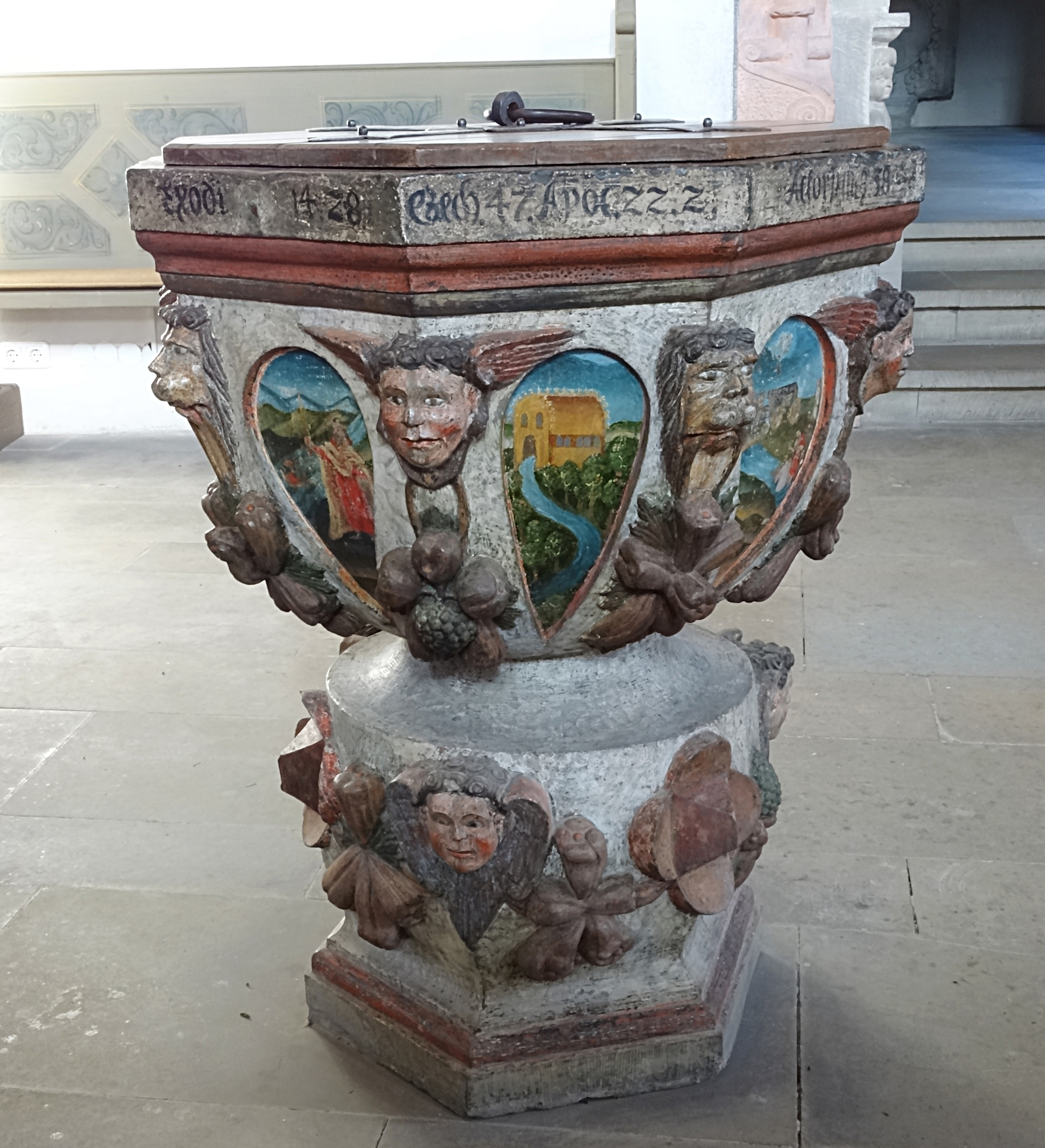
Baptismal font by Hans Grüler

The rectangular building has a gable roof over three naves. The exterior walls of the church were initially regularly ashlar plastered. Inside, the west gallery was rebuilt several times and in 1975 it was renewed according to the historical model. In 1695 major restoration works were carried out. In 1738 the church received new windows; the galleries were painted white. After the town fire of 1878, the church was extensively renovated in 1881, and was last restored on a larger scale in 2002 and 2003.

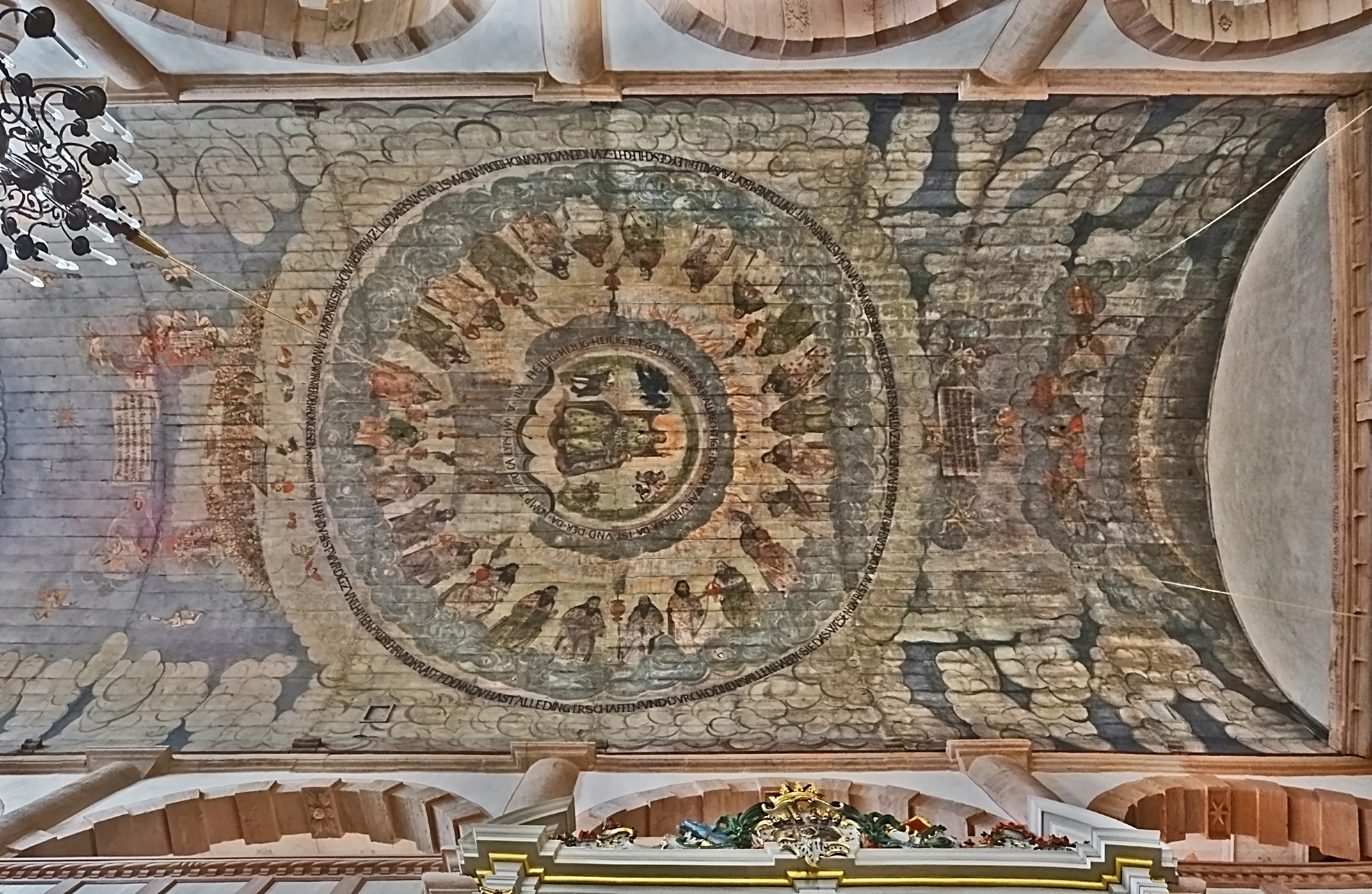
Ceiling painting by Nicolaus Storant

The large wooden barrel vault was decorated in 1619 by Nicolaus Storant of Meiningen with a ceiling painting, painted directly on the wood, showing the heavenly throne of God as described in Revelation, chapters 4 and 5. Also from 1619 is a stone offertory box by Hans Markert. On the northern long side and on the rear side are two seated galleries, one above the other, aligned with the pulpit with the four evangelists. The church interior, including the galleries, has a seating capacity of 1000. The main entrance of the church on the south side from 1616 is splendidly decorated in Renaissance style. The east portal, also in Renaissance style with an obelisk, dates from 1615. On the south wall, Christian scenes in gray painting are arranged around the windows, showing God's love, faithfulness and care, Cain and Abel, David, and Goliath. On the walls are tombstones, which were rearranged between 1961 and 1975. A Baron von Stein is buried in the crypt under the choir.

During the Thirty Years' War the older bells of the church were remelted. Wandering bell founders from Lorraine cast two bells for the town church in 1645, one with the town coat of arms and the other with the names of the two clergymen of Ostheim and the founder. In 1714 the large bell broke and was recast by Mattheus Ulrich. He worked in the names of the reigning Duke of Saxony as well as officials and clergymen.

=== Organ ===
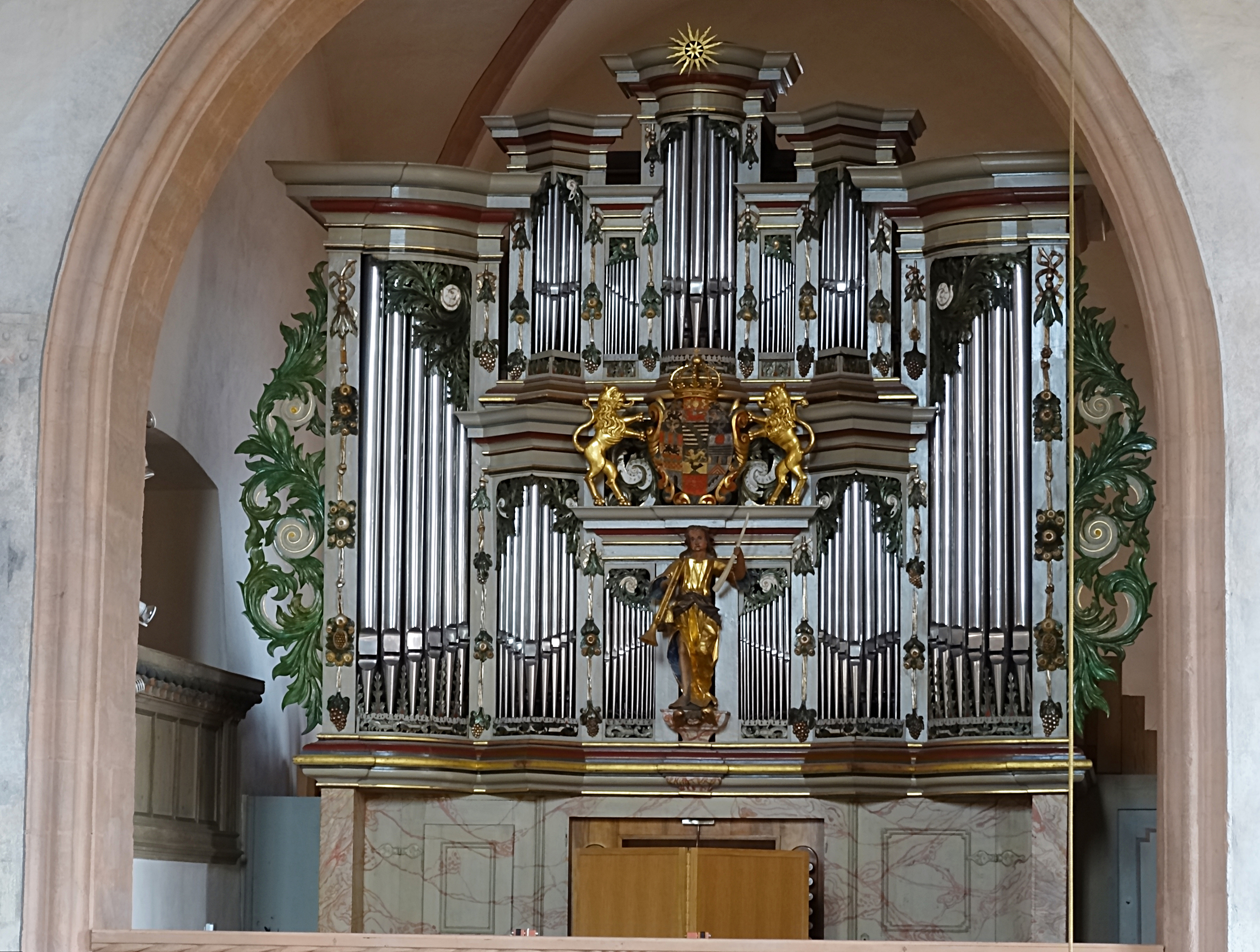
Organ by Johann Ernst Döring

The organ in the choir room was built by Johann Ernst Döring in 1738 and stood in the extended west gallery from 1894 to 1975. When it was moved back to the choir loft in 1975, two side tower structures from 1894 were removed from the casing. The organ has two manuals and pedal with a total of 37 stops. The case was repainted with the former color scheme and gilded. The organ was renovated by master organ builder Otto Hoffmann and Sons during the relocation. In the center is the ducal Saxon coat of arms with two gilded lions as coat of arms holders and above it the Zimbelstern. Below it is a trombone angel with movable arms, which was newly gilded during the renovation. The two large foliate vine surrounds were also newly carved. A special feature is that when the Trompete 8' register in the Hauptwerk is operated, a mechanism is set in motion by which the angelic figure below the escutcheon puts the Trumpet to its mouth. The choir organ can also be played from the organ.

I Hauptwerk C,D–c^{3}
Quintatön	16′
Principal	8′
Gedackt	8′
Gemshorn	8′
Viola da Gamba	8′
Octave	4′
Flauto dolce	4′
Quinte	3′
Terz	3 ^{1}/_{5}′
Flageolet	2′
Mixtur IV	2′
Cymbel III	1′
Trompete	8′

II Positiv C,D–c^{3}
Praestant	8′
Quintatön	8′
Flauto traverso	8′
Salicional	8′
Principal	4′
Spitzflöte	4′
Kleingedackt	4′
Octave	2′
Mixture III	1′
Dulcian	8′

Pedal C,D–d^{1}
Principal bass	16′
Sub bass	16′
Quinte	12′
Octavo bass	8′
Gedackt bass	8′
Octavbaß	4′
Mixtur V	2 ^{2}/_{3}′
Trombone bass	16′

=== Towers ===
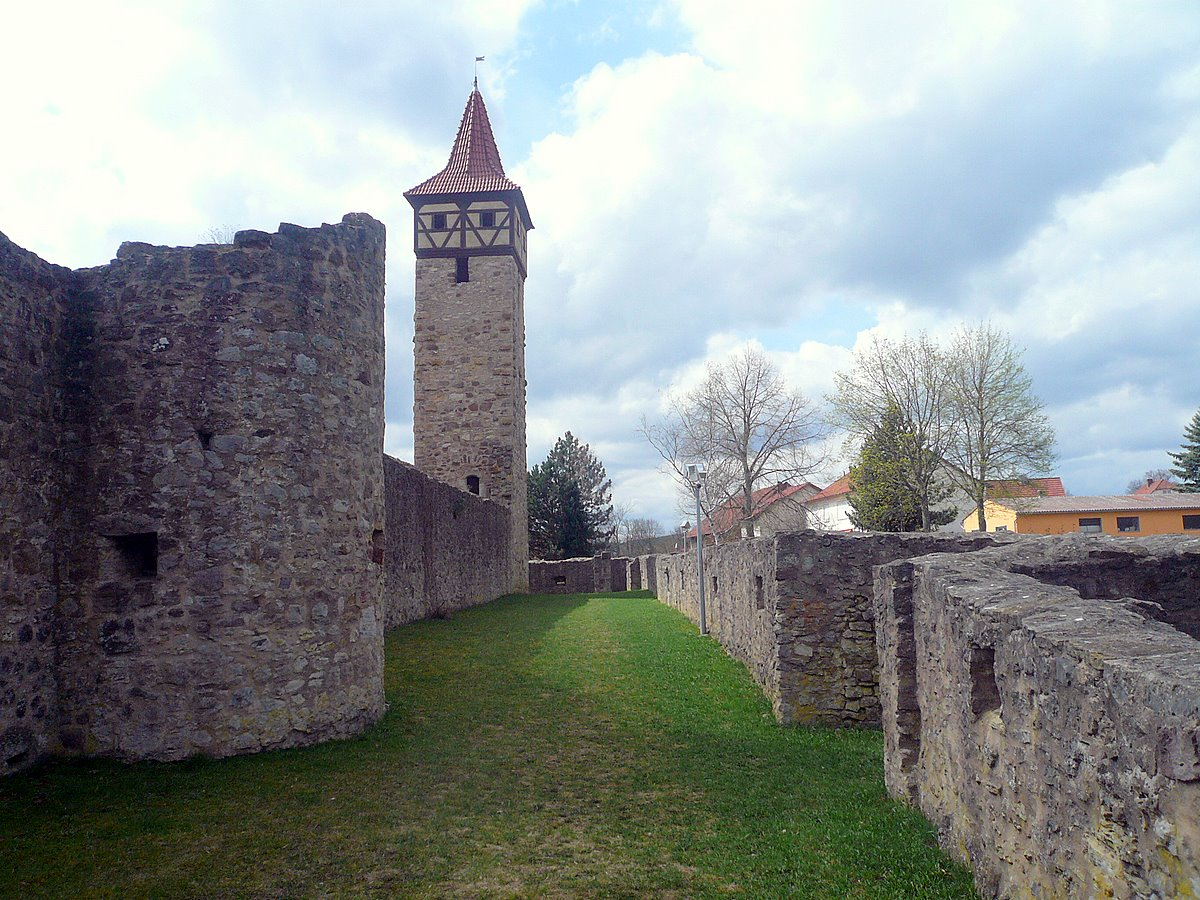
Achtlöchriger Turm and northern Zwinger

There are four towers on the inner perimeter wall. The round Schulglockenturm on the southeast corner with a high entrance on the second floor has five floors. Due to its location at the former only entrance, it was of greater importance. It was built in two construction phases. The tower shaft dates back to 1417 and 1418, while the upper tower room and the attic were built after 1426. The tower used to house the school bell, from which it takes its name. It has a height of 26 meters and the largest diameter of all the towers of the castle with over five meters.

The Achtlöchrige Turm at the northwest corner takes its name from the eight windows in the half-timbered upper floor. It is 22 meters high and has six floors, of which the five lower ones are solidly built of rubbles. On each of the floors, which are accessible by a ladder, there is a room. The lower floors with almost square ground plan were built in 1417 and 1418. According to an inscription, the tower room was completed in 1666. In 1935 the half-timbered walls were renewed.

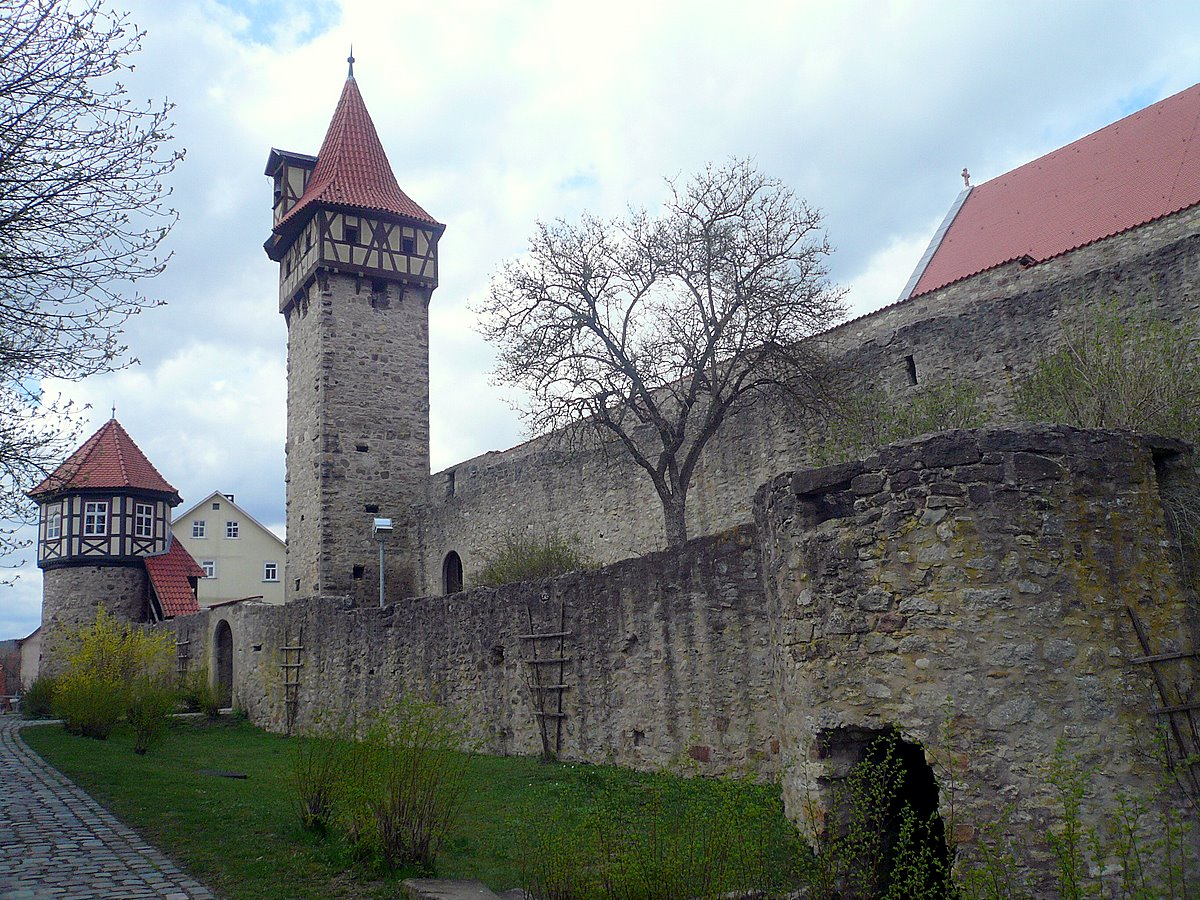
Waagglockenturm with southern wall parts

The Waagglockenturm with a rectangular ground plan and humped ashlars at the corners stands at the southwest corner. The external dimensions of the tower are about 4.5 by 4.8 meters. The lower five floors are made of quarry stone, the upper third is half-timbered. The half-timbered upper floor has a bell bay, the roof is octagonal. The year of construction of the tower is not known. The tower helmet and the tower room date back to the time after 1436. In the tower there used to be the town scales, from which the name derives. From 1618 it is known that the tower had a clock. By means of an iron clockwork, the bell was struck every hour and the time was displayed on a large dial. The bell, which hangs in a hatch renewed in 1739, also served as a fire bell and as a signal sign that the town scales could be used. That is why the tower used to be called the beating tower. The Waagglockenturm is the highest of the fortress church with 26.5 meters and six floors. It can be climbed as a lookout tower.

The round Pulverturm at the northeast corner has a height of 16.5 and a diameter of about 4.5 meters. The massive tower is integrated into the inner eastern and northern fortification wall and is accessible via a battlement. The different wall structure made of quarry stones over three floors is striking. It was described as a powder tower in a town account as early as 1642. However, there is no evidence that it served as a storage place for gunpowder. The year of construction is not known. The tower is said to have been rebuilt in 1664 after damage during the Thirty Years' War.

The round Wächterturm, also called the Zwinger tower, stands near the Waagglockenturm at the southwestern corner point of the outer wall. It is the only surviving tower on the outer perimeter wall and has a subsequently added half-timbered upper storey and an octagonal tented roof. The tower has three floors and a basement. Its height is 11.75 meters. Access is via a wooden staircase on the upper floor. Inside, another staircase leads to the second floor with two small rooms and a larger one, which served as bedrooms and living quarters. The fire and night watchman lived there from the 17th to the 19th century. The tower was temporarily named Kißlingsturm in the 20th century after a man named Kißling who lived in it.

== Bibliography ==
- Annette Faber (2005), Kirchenburg St. Michael – Ostheim vor der Rhön (12. ed.), Regensburg: Schnell & Steiner, ISBN 978-3795445706
- Edmund Zöller, Dieter Dietrich (1994), Wehrkirchen und Kirchenburgen in Unterfranken: Steigerwald – Rhön – Spessart – Fränk. Weinland, Uffenheim: Seehars, ISBN 3-927598-14-3
- Klaus, Leidorf; Peter, Ettel; Walter, Irlinger; Joachim, Zeune (1999), Burgen in Bayern: 7000 Jahre Geschichte im Luftbild, Stuttgart: Konrad Theiss Verlag GmbH & Co., ISBN 3-8062-1364-X
- Ursula Pfistermeister (2001), Wehrhaftes Franken, Nürnberg: Verlag Hans Carl, ISBN 3-418-00386-9
- Diethard H. Klein (1991), Frankens Burgen einst und heute, Bayreuth: Druckhaus Bayreuth, ISBN 3-922808-31-X
- Wilfried Bahnmüller, Michael B. Weithmann (2006), Burgen und Schlösser in Franken und der Oberpfalz, München: J. Berg Verlag im C. J. Bucher Verlag GmbH, ISBN 3-7658-4114-5
