= Ostheim vor der Rhön (Verwaltungsgemeinschaft) =

- Verwaltungsgemeinschaft
- Location of Ostheim vor der Rhön within Rhön-Grabfeld district
- Interactive map of Ostheim vor der Rhön
- Location within Germany Location within Bavaria
- Coordinates: 50°28′N 10°14′E
- Country: Germany
- State: Bavaria
- Admin. region: Lower Franconia
- District: Rhön-Grabfeld
- Seat: Ostheim
- Subdivisions: 3 municipalities

Area
  - Total: 71.61 km^{2} (27.65 sq mi)

Population (2025-12-31)
  - Total: 4,796
  - Density: 66.97/km^{2} (173.5/sq mi)
- Time zone: UTC+01:00 (CET)
  - Summer (DST): UTC+02:00 (CEST)
- Website: www.ostheim-vgem.de

Ostheim vor der Rhön is a Verwaltungsgemeinschaft (municipal association) in the district Rhön-Grabfeld in Bavaria, Germany. Its seat is in Ostheim.

It consists of the following municipalities:

1. Ostheim
2. Sondheim vor der Rhön
3. Willmars
