= Bionade =

Range of non-alcoholic drinks

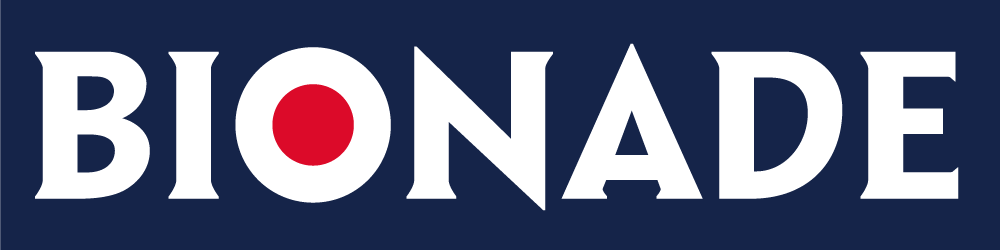
Logo

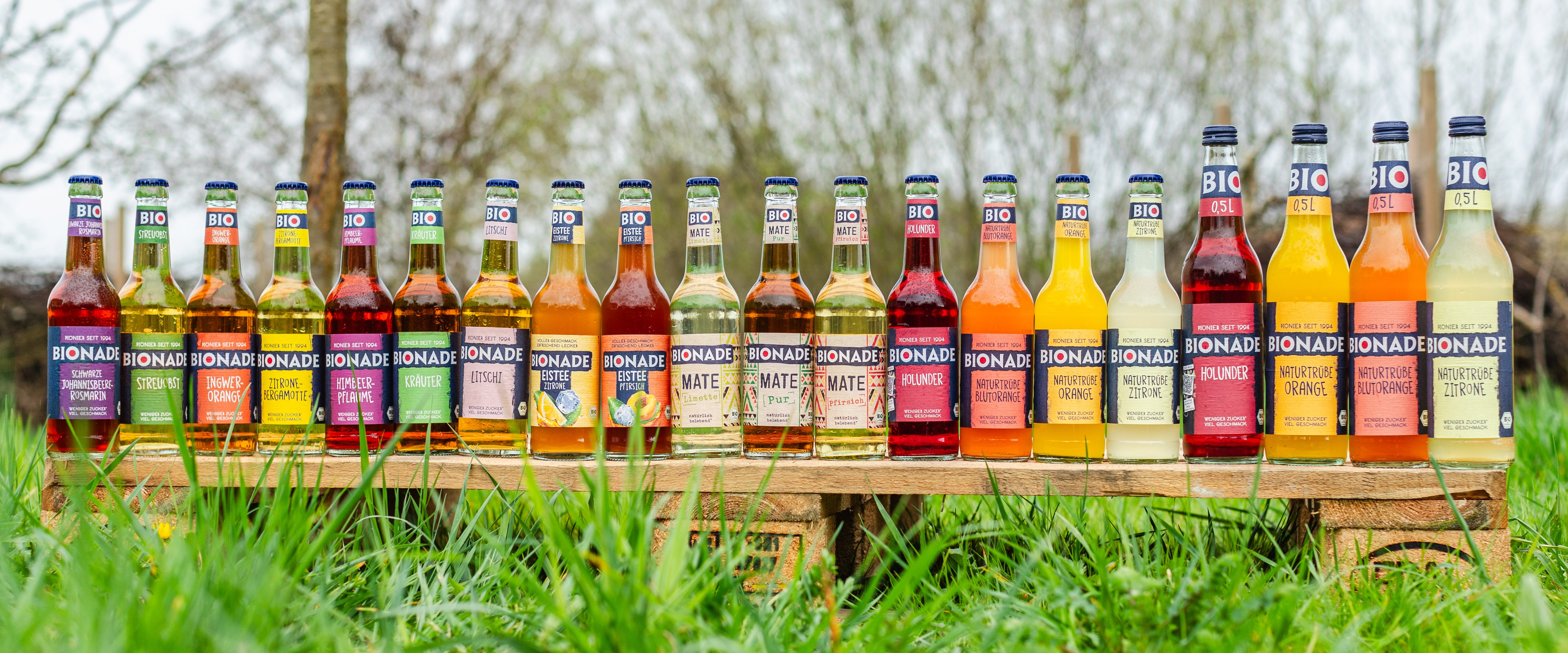
Product range in 2024

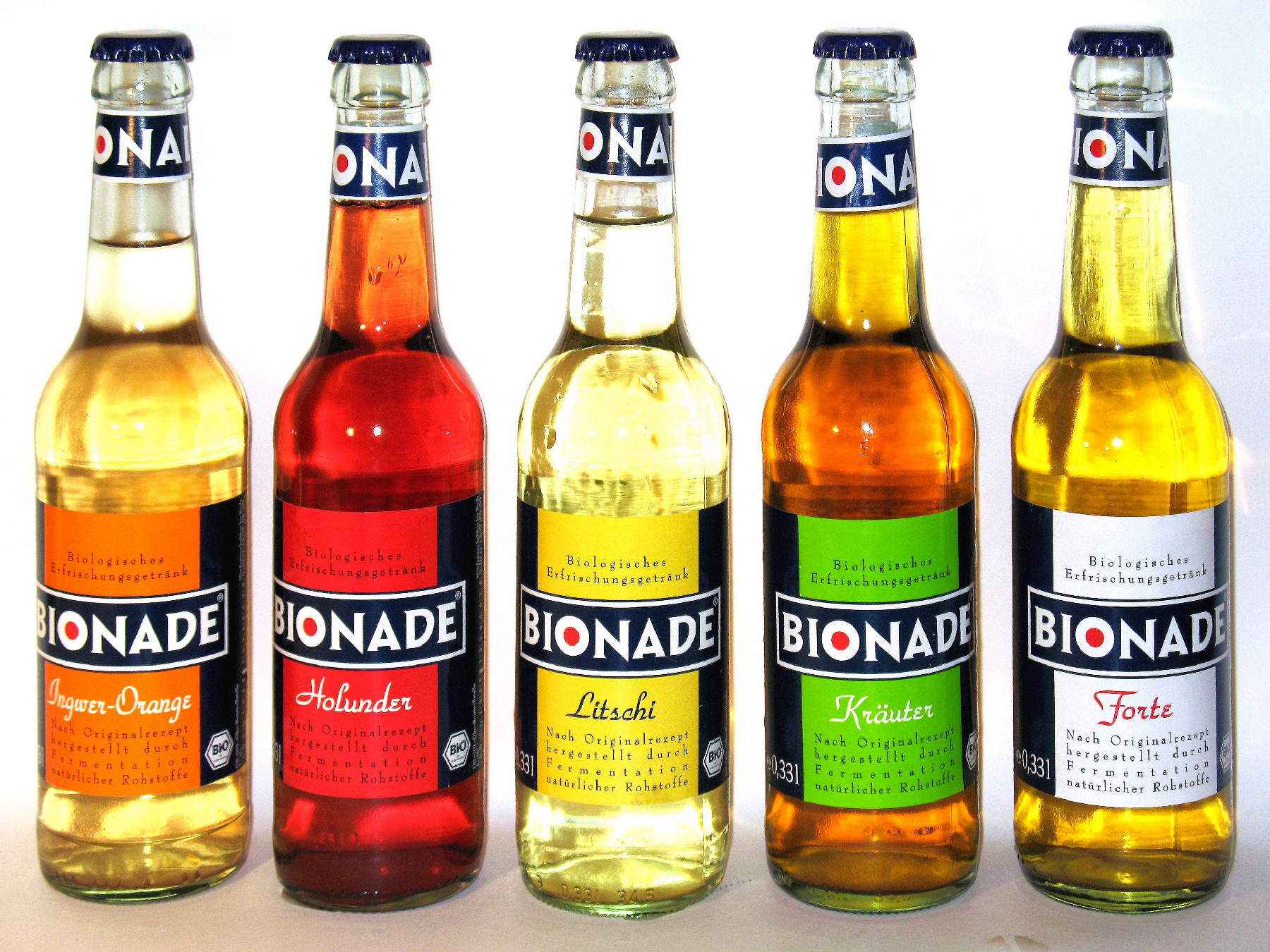
Various flavours of Bionade in 2007

Bionade [ˌbi.(j)oˈnaːdə] is a German range of non-alcoholic, organic fermented and carbonated beverages. It is manufactured in the Bavarian town of Ostheim vor der Rhön by the Peter beer brewery. Sales started in 1995 and Bionade is now available in most European countries. Until 2018 Bionade GmbH was a subsidiary of Radeberger, a group of breweries which is a division of Dr. Oetker. Now Bionade is part of the Hassia Group.

== History ==
Dieter Leipold was the master brewer at Privatbrauerei Peter in Ostheim, a small town in northern Bavaria, and a relation by marriage of the Kowalsky family, owners of the brewery. Worried about the future of the company, which was facing bankruptcy, he had the idea of producing a nonalcoholic drink by fermentation, on the same principles and under the same purity laws as German beer: the drink would consist only of the natural ingredients malt, water, sugar, and fruit essences, and would not contain corn syrup or other artificial additives. He experimented for eight years in a bathroom laboratory, spending €1.5 million of the brewery owner Peter Kowalsky's money. He isolated a strain of bacteria capable of converting the sugar that normally becomes alcohol into nonalcoholic gluconic acid, which he used to ferment the new drink.

Bionade went on sale in 1995, at first in health resorts and fitness centres. It was picked up by Hamburg's largest beverage distributor, Göttsche, in 1998, but was not reaching a broad public.

In 1999 Kowalsky hired the marketing expert Wolfgang Blum. Blum devised a new marketing strategy for Bionade. A retro blue, white, and red logo was designed. The bottle was made out of clear glass (instead of brown) but its form was based on a classical vitreous longneck beer format. This eased the logistics of distributing the drink and also helped to sell Bionade in bars and nightclubs, as a non-alcoholic drink that looked like a beer. The product was branded as a new trendy drink. As the company could not afford advertising on television or in the print media, they first placed it in bars and restaurants in Hamburg which were frequented by marketers and advertisers. Further viral marketing attempts included sponsoring sporting, cultural and children's events throughout Germany.

By 2002-03 two million bottles of the drink were sold. A wave of health awareness was sweeping Germany: for example, 75% of all Germans approved a ban on smoking in bars. Sales reached seven million in 2004, twenty million in 2005, seventy million in 2006, when 73 million bottles were sold, and by 2007 total sales had reached 200 million.

In 2004, Coca-Cola offered to buy the rights to the drink and the Bionade brand, but the producer rejected the offer, citing its plans to expand internationally on its own. By 2006 it was available in Switzerland, Austria and the Benelux countries, and it has since reached Scandinavia, Italy, Spain, Portugal and Ireland. In 2007 the company planned expansion into the US.

In 2007, Bionade started its first advertising campaign, using the slogan "Bionade. Das offizielle Getränk einer besseren Welt" ("Bionade. The official beverage of a better world"). This appealed to some of the protesters against the 33rd G8 summit, which was taking place at the time in Heiligendamm, Mecklenburg-Western Pomerania, and led to the stereotype that anti-globalisation activists always drink the beverage. The campaign encompassed billboards in fifteen German cities and radio commercials.

In 2007 plastic bottles were introduced and Bionade appeared in McDonald's cafés. However, sales declined in 2008 and further declined after an increase in prices, to 60 million bottles in 2011. The Kowalsky family sold part ownership to Schindel-Holding and then to Radeberger, who became sole owners in 2012 until 2018. Since 2018 Bionade is part of the Hassia Group (Hassia Gruppe).

== Metaphorical use ==
In 2007 German journalist Henning Sußebach coined Bionade-Biedermeier a German neologism combining Bionade, and the word Biedermeier, an era in Central Europe between 1815 and 1848. He used it to describe the lifestyle in Berlin’s Prenzlauer Berg district in an article published by Die Zeit. The term is a German equivalent of e.g. LOHAS and Bobo (bourgeois bohémiens) and gained some media attention and expanded use since. The underlying allusion is being used as well in related wordings like Bionade-Bourgeoisie, Biohème and Generation Biedermeier. Henning Sußebach described the Prenzlauer Berg (Prenzelberg) as an experimental field of "New Germany" and Biotop of the rich and creative and young urban professionals. As e.g. in Social Consciousness in the Bionade-Biedermeier, the term has been used to describe current films and social tendencies in Germany.

== Product ==
Leipold refuses to divulge the exact chemical process he used. According to him, the gluconic acid strengthens the taste of the sugar, so that less is needed. After fermentation, natural flavours—elderberry, lychee, orange-ginger, quince or herbs—are added along with carbonation.

All flavours of Bionade contain water, sugar, malt from barley (2%), carbon acid, calcium carbonate and magnesium carbonate. The herbal and lychee flavoured versions also contain natural aromas. The elderberry flavoured version additionally contains concentrated elderberry juice and natural aromas, and the orange-ginger flavoured bottles contain extract of ginger and natural aroma. The sugar, barley, and elderberries are organic.

The manufacturer emphasises that Bionade tastes like a soft drink, but is healthier than conventional high-sugar soft drinks. They support the claim of healthiness by referring to the relatively low level of sugar, sodium and flavor-enhancing additives, the absence of phosphorus or a stabilising agent, while both calcium and magnesium are present. The website makes more health claims and suggests that calcium is needed for bones and teeth, for nerves and muscles, while magnesium is said to work against listlessness and fatigue.
