= Willmars =

- Municipality
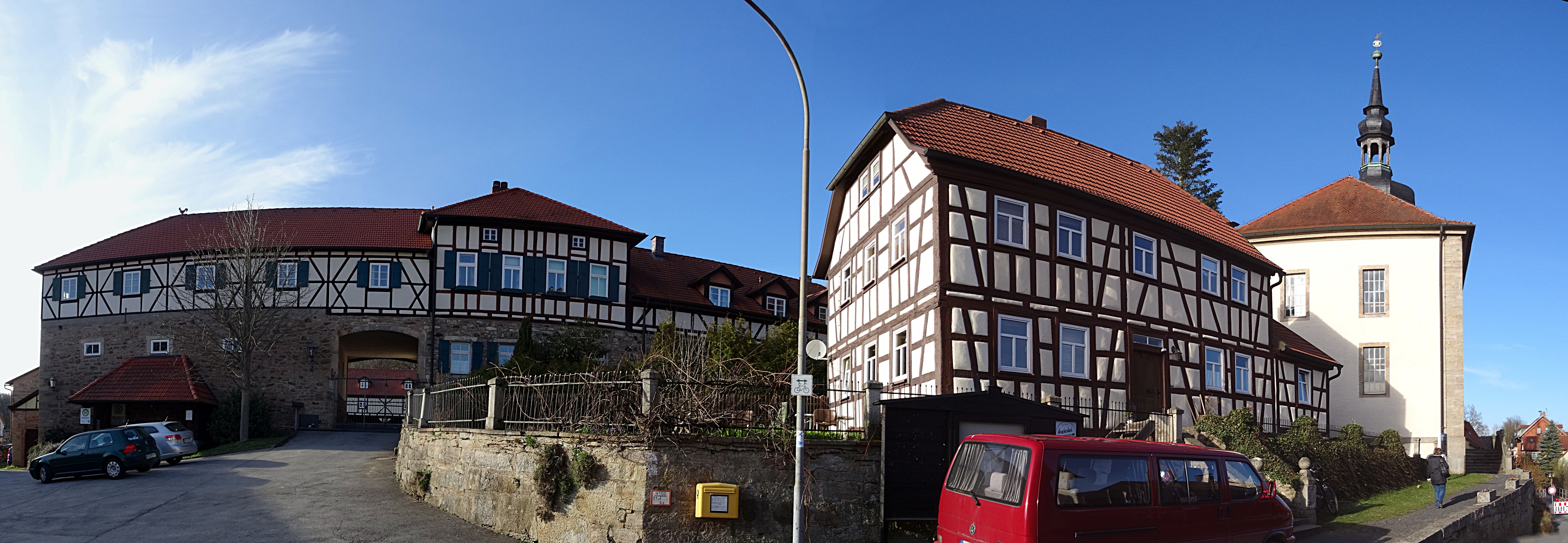
- Palace Square

- Coat of arms

- Location of Willmars within Rhön-Grabfeld district
- Interactive map of Willmars
- Location within Germany Location within Bavaria
- Coordinates: 50°30′N 10°15′E
- Country: Germany
- State: Bavaria
- Admin. region: Unterfranken
- District: Rhön-Grabfeld
- Municipal assoc.: Ostheim vor der Rhön

Government
  - Mayor (2020–26): Reimund Voß

Area
  - Total: 12.17 km^{2} (4.70 sq mi)
- Elevation: 340 m (1,120 ft)

Population (2025-12-31)
  - Total: 555
  - Density: 45.6/km^{2} (118/sq mi)
- Time zone: UTC+01:00 (CET)
  - Summer (DST): UTC+02:00 (CEST)
- Postal codes: 97647
- Dialling codes: 09779
- Vehicle registration: NES
- Website: www.willmars.rhoen-saale.net

Willmars is a municipality in the district of Rhön-Grabfeld in Bavaria in Germany.
