= Sondheim (surname) =

Sondheim is a surname. Notable people with the surname include:

- Alan Sondheim, American poet and critic
- Erna Sondheim (1904–2008), German female fencer
- Stephen Sondheim (1930–2021), American stage musical and film composer and lyricist

== Sondheimer ==
- Hillel Sondheimer (1840, Eppingen - 1899, Heidelberg), German rabbi
- Franz Sondheimer (1926–1981), German-British chemist
