= Herbert Schmidt Ostheim =

German firearm manufacturing company

Herbert Schmidt Ostheim was a German gunmaking company, that was also known as HS - Herbert Schmidt Waffentechnik. The company was based in Ostheim, (Rhön).

== Early days ==
The company was founded in 1919 by the two Brothers Franz and Herbert Schmidt in Zella-Mehlis. The Schmidt brothers started in their own living room, using a foot driven drilling machine, a mobile forge and some smaller tools. Four persons manufactured shotguns in 12, 16 and 20 gauge, as well as in .410 caliber; they also produced some screwdriving tools.

Slowly, this small team developed a small factory. But in 1928 a fire destroyed almost the whole production unit; it was then rebuilt quickly.

== International and domestic markets ==
At the same time, the company began producing rifles in 6 mm and 9 mm rimfire caliber, as well as buckshot carbines in .410 caliber and air pistols. About 90 per cent of the production was destined for export, mainly to the US and South America, especially Brazil. Before WW II, the company provided Sweden with repeating carbines in 6.5x55 and 8x57 IS calibers. During WW II, the Schmidts serviced, maintained and repaired the K 98 rifles of the German Wehrmacht as well as maintained spare parts of different weapons of all categories.

In 1945, the company was evacuated to Baden Württemberg in Germany, where it began to produce axles and pedals for bicycles, as well as ovens and table lamps. Then Herbert Schmidt moved a part of the company to Ostheim, (Rhön), near Fulda.

=== Pistols and revolvers ===
In 1950, Herbert Schmidt got the license to produce starting pistols and blank-firers, which were then made in a rented location. The first model was a single-shot alarm gun (for yachting purposes). In 1951, the production hall was completed, and the model range had been increased, to include a double-action revolver in .22 caliber. The production of own cartridges began at the same time. In 1959, a single-action revolver in the Western style, the 120, 121, 121 a and the 121 S, were born; they were first made in .22 magnum.

Many different versions of this revolver followed and appeared in .22lr, .22magnum and 357 magnum, as well as 6mm blank and 9mm blank. After Herbert Schmidt died in 1974, the factory was run by his wife Christa and his son Wolfgang. Many different sorts of guns were in production at this time. In 1977, the company began to produce swords, knives and bayonets, as well as survival knives. In 1994, the company introduced a single-action revolver, the "Texas Scout", which was convertible from .45 long Colt into .22lr. A switchable firing pin, interchangeable cylinder and an inlet barrel made this possible. The gun was available in 3" and 4" version. Some more interesting guns then began to be made, and the "Texas Scout" also became available in .45 blank. Herbert Schmidt then also made a double-action revolver, the "Buffalo Combo", a .38 - .22lr convertible. Some time in the late 1990s, the company disappeared. It is estimated that rentability was no longer guaranteed, because of the immense costs of meeting the demands of the constantly changing German gun law, as well as of restrictions in gun exports.

Herbert Schmidt had been providing many manufacturers and gun exporters with parts and guns since the 1950s, so that it is difficult to list all of them or research the whole production range. It seems that Schmidt had produced single-action revolvers since the early 1920s and exported them to the United States post and pre WWII. All parts of the guns were made out of steel alloys, except for the frames, which were fashioned of a zinc-aluminium alloy. They were sold in the US as inexpensive alternative branded revolvers, made of soft and inferior metals. These firearms are more a curious piece and should be fired only with standard velocity ammunition and with great caution.

Nowadays Herbert Schmidt guns are rare, spare parts almost do not exist, and their low price makes them uninteresting for collectors. In Europe, collectors pay increasingly high sums for Herbert Schmidt single-action models, especially the blank-firing versions. Prices can vary from US$75.00(great/showroom condition) to $5.00 (mean value approx. US$25.00).

== Sources ==
- http://www.proshooter.org
- my own collection of Schmidt revolvers
- http://www.Co2air.de
