= Sondheim vor der Rhön =

Sondheim v.d.Rhön
- Municipality
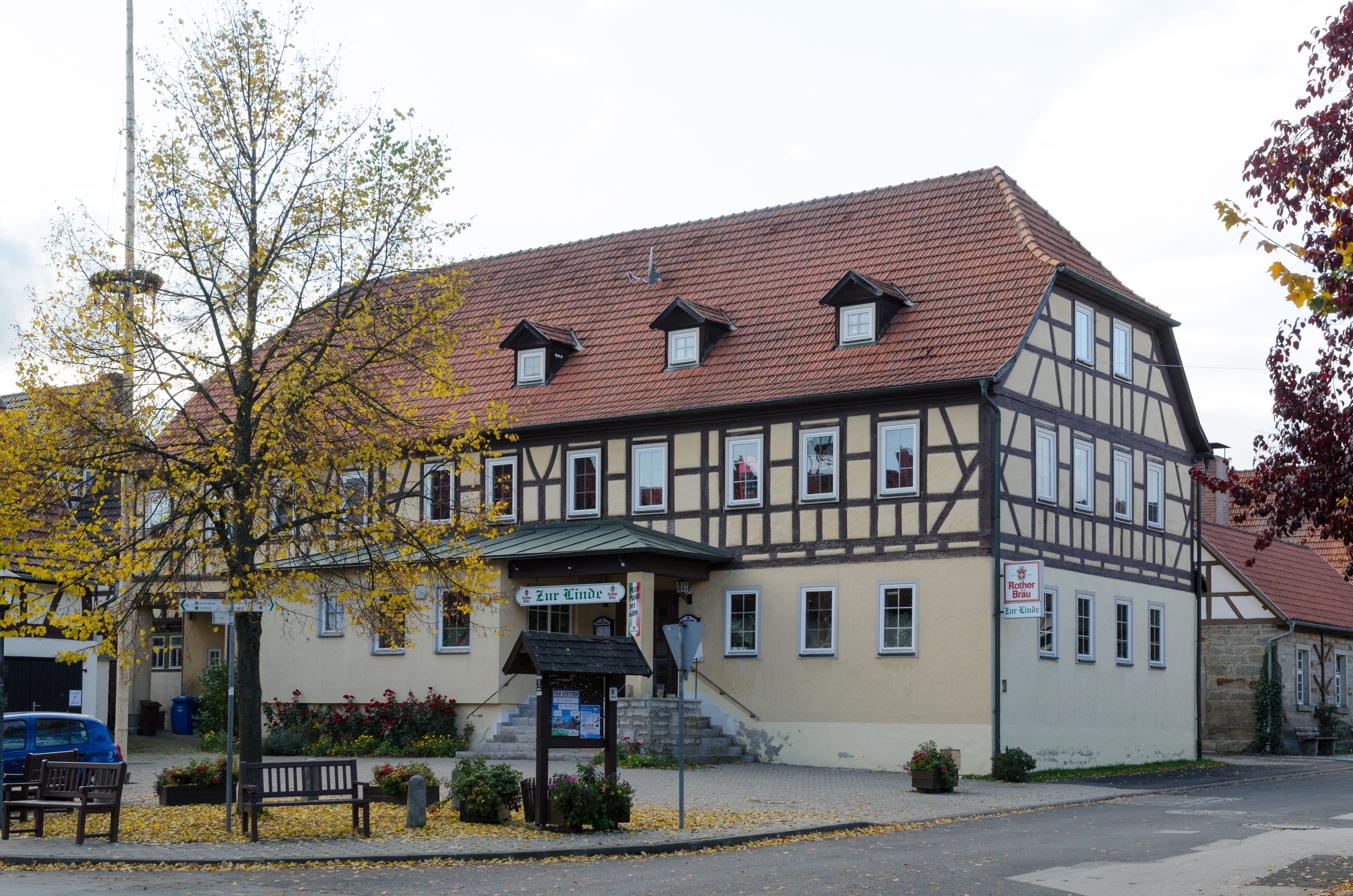
- Linde Inn in Stetten

- Coat of arms

- Location of Sondheim v.d.Rhön within Rhön-Grabfeld district
- Interactive map of Sondheim v.d.Rhön
- Location within Germany Location within Bavaria
- Coordinates: 50°28′N 10°10′E
- Country: Germany
- State: Bavaria
- Admin. region: Unterfranken
- District: Rhön-Grabfeld
- Municipal assoc.: Ostheim vor der Rhön

Government
  - Mayor (2020–26): Thilo Wehner

Area
  - Total: 18.58 km^{2} (7.17 sq mi)
- Elevation: 358 m (1,175 ft)

Population (2025-12-31)
  - Total: 933
  - Density: 50.2/km^{2} (130/sq mi)
- Time zone: UTC+01:00 (CET)
  - Summer (DST): UTC+02:00 (CEST)
- Postal codes: 97647
- Dialling codes: 09779
- Vehicle registration: NES
- Website: http://www.sondheim.rhoen-saale.net/

Sondheim vor der Rhön is a municipality in the district Rhön-Grabfeld, Bavaria, Germany. It is administrated by the Verwaltungsgemeinschaft Ostheim. As of 2002 it had a population of 1123, and covers an area of 18.58 km^{2}.

== History ==
The first written proof of Sondheim was on February 27, 789, when it was mentioned in a donation document of the monastery of Fulda. Sondheim was the main settlement of the Baringau area. In 1359, it received the right to be called "city", however it was never exercised. Until 1945 Sondheim was an enclave of Saxe-Weimar and later Thuringia, and was added to Bavaria due to the military administration after World War II. In 1978, the village Stetten was included into the municipality, which then joined the Verwaltungsgemeinschaft.

== Coat of arms ==
The coat of arms shows in the bottom three rows of red and silver blocks, the escutcheon of Henneberg. Silver and red were the colors of the bishops of Würzburg. To the left is the head of a ram, the symbol animal of the Gebsattel family, as one of the historically important land owners of the area. The yellow crown-ring to the right is taken from the coat of arms of Saxony, recalling that the municipality was formerly an enclave of Saxe-Weimar.
