= Ostheim =

- Town
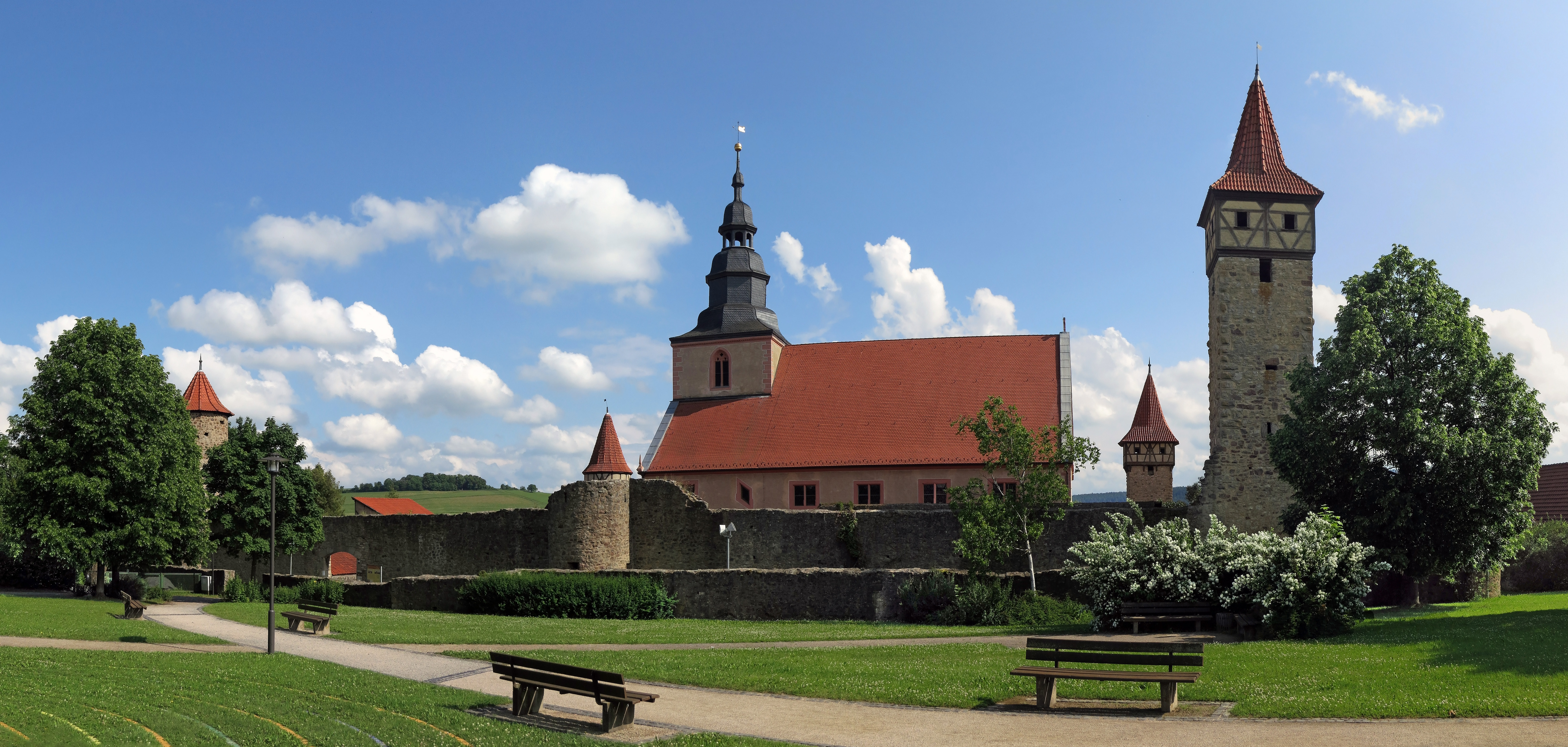
- Fortress church in Ostheim

- Coat of arms

- Location of Ostheim within Rhön-Grabfeld district
- Interactive map of Ostheim
- Location within Germany Location within Bavaria
- Coordinates: 50°28′N 10°13′E
- Country: Germany
- State: Bavaria
- Admin. region: Unterfranken
- District: Rhön-Grabfeld
- Municipal assoc.: Ostheim vor der Rhön

Government
  - Mayor (2020–26): Steffen Malzer (CSU)

Area
  - Total: 40.85 km^{2} (15.77 sq mi)
- Elevation: 300 m (980 ft)

Population (2025-12-31)
  - Total: 3,308
  - Density: 80.98/km^{2} (209.7/sq mi)
- Time zone: UTC+01:00 (CET)
  - Summer (DST): UTC+02:00 (CEST)
- Postal codes: 97645
- Dialling codes: 09777
- Vehicle registration: NES
- Website: www.ostheim.de

Ostheim vor der Rhön (German pronunciation: [ˈɔsthaɪm foːɐ̯ deːɐ̯ ˈʁøːn], lit. 'Ostheim before the Rhön') is a town in Northern Bavaria in the district of Rhön-Grabfeld in Franconia. Though politically part of Bavaria since 1947, it was historically a part of Thuringia, and remains religiously, architecturally, and to some extent culturally distinct from its immediate surroundings.

== History ==
Ostheim was first mentioned in 804. During the Reformation, Ostheim (along with much of the surrounding region) became Protestant. However, in the 1580s and 1590s, a powerful Counter-Reformation effort led by Julius Echter von Mespelbrunn, the Prince-Bishop of Würzburg, reconverted most of the Streutal (the Streu valley, in northern Franconia) back to Catholicism. Ostheim and a few villages nearby became Protestant islands in a solidly Catholic region. (The town's heavily fortified Lutheran church dates from this period.) Ostheim was sacked by Imperial troops in 1634 during the Thirty Years War, but survived and retained its distinctive character. From the 17th century until 1920 the town was an exclave of Protestant Saxe-Weimar-Eisenach, first in Catholic Franconia and then in Bavaria after Franconia came under the Bavarian crown. After the First World War, it became an exclave of Thuringia in Bavaria from 1920 until 1947.

During the late 19th and early 20th century, as religious differences faded in importance, the town became increasingly integrated into the surrounding region, becoming a small regional industrial center as well as a market for the surrounding agricultural hinterland. In 1945 Ostheim became part of the American controlled zone, in the Free State of Bavaria. In 1947 it was formally transferred to Bavarian control in exchange for some similar exclaves in the Soviet Zone.

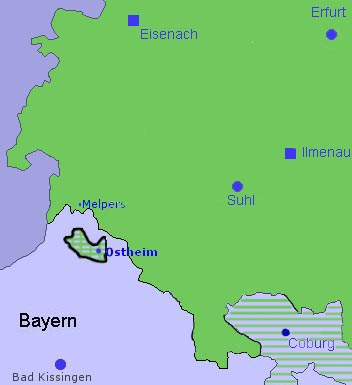
Map showing the enclave/exclave relationship

Ostheim lies on the river Streu between Mellrichstadt and Fladungen. It is one of the stops in Wim Wenders' 1976 road trip film Kings of the Road.

The gunmaking company Herbert Schmidt Ostheim (also: HS - Herbert Schmidt Waffentechnik) was based in Ostheim. It is also the home of German soft drink manufacturer Bionade. Ostheim's historic architecture, walkable town center and easy access to the biking and hiking trails of the Streu valley have helped make it a local center for tourism.

== Landmarks ==
- Fortress church, a large Lutheran church surrounded by walls and towers. Includes a small museum.
- Lichtenburg, 12th-century castle on a hill above the town center. Most of the castle is a ruin, but part has been renovated for use as a guest house
- Historic Old Town with mills and half-timbered houses, including many well preserved examples from the 17th and 18th centuries. The architecture is a mixture of Thuringian and Bavarian influences.
- Organ museum in the town center with over a dozen historical organs and interactive displays on construction, preservation and organ music
- Hill Graves

== Economy ==
=== Traffic ===
Ostheim is located on the Bundesstraße 285, the Bundesautobahn 71 is about ten kilometers away and accessible via the connection point Mellrichstadt.

The railway station of the city, on the route Mellrichstadt-Fladungen of Streutalbahn is operated only seasonally in the museum traffic.

=== Established businesses ===
- Bionade GmbH – manufacturers of a biological soft drink
- Hey Orgelbau – manufacturer of pipe organs
- Organbuilder Hoffmann und Schindler – manufacturer of Organs
- Verlag Peter Engstler – alternative literature, poetry, and magazines

== People ==
Ernst Salomon Cyprian (22 September 1673 – 19 September 1745 Gotha) was a lutheranian theologist and librarian

Friedrich Christian Gottlieb Scheidemantel, (17 September 1735 – 18 June 1796), medicine, author and psychologist
