= Goldman–Sachs family =

Family of Ashkenazi Jewish descent

The Goldman–Sachs family is a family of Ashkenazi Jewish descent known for the leading investment bank Goldman Sachs. Marcus Goldman, while attending classes at the synagogue in Würzburg, met Joseph Sachs, who would become his lifelong friend. Marcus Goldman's youngest daughter, Louisa, married Samuel Sachs, the son of Joseph Sachs, fellow Lower Franconia, Bavaria immigrant. Louisa's older sister and Sam's older brother had already married. His oldest son, Julius Goldman, married Sarah Adler, daughter of Samuel Adler. In 1882, Goldman invited his son-in-law Samuel to join him in the business and changed the firm's name to M. Goldman and Sachs. For almost fifty years, all the partners came from the extended family.

== Family tree ==
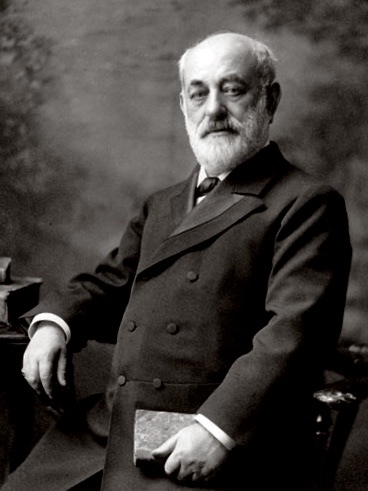
Marcus Goldman, 1890s

- Marcus Goldman (1821–1904), founder of Goldman Sachs, married to Bertha Goldman
  - Rebecca Goldman Dreyfuss (1851–?), married to Ludwig Dreyfuss (c. 1840s–1918)
  - Julius Goldman (1852–1909) married to Sarah Adler Goldman, daughter of Samuel Adler (1809–1891)
    - Bertha Goldman Gutmann (1879–1936), married to Bernhard Gutmann (1869-1936), painter
    - Marcus Isaac Goldman (1881–1965), geologist
    - Hetty Goldman (1881–1972), archaeologist
    - Agnes Goldman Sanborn (1887–1984), married to Ashton Sanborn (1882–1970), archaeologist
  - Rosa Goldman Sachs married to Julius Sachs (1849–1934)
    - Ernest Sachs (1879–1958), physician, married to Mary Parmly Koues (1882–1973)
      - Ernest Sachs, Jr. (1916–2001), neurosurgeon, married Jeanne O'Sullivan
        - Ernest Paul "Rusty" Sachs (1944-)
        - Ann Sachs (1947-)
        - Patricia Sachs (1951-)
        - Christopher Michael Sachs (1952-2017)
        - James Sachs (1955-2002)
        - Robert Donal Sachs (1961-2022)
      - Thomas Dudley Sachs (1925-2009)
  - Louisa Goldman Sachs married to Samuel Sachs (1851–1935)
    - Paul J. Sachs (1878–1965), art historian, married to Meta Pollak (–1960)
      - Elizabeth Sachs (1905-1998)
      - Celia Sachs Robinson (1908-1999), married to Charles A. Robinson, Jr. (1900–1965), classical scholar
        - Charles Alexander Robinson III (1929-2022)
        - Samuel Sachs Robinson (1933-)
        - Franklin W. Robinson (1940-)
      - Marjorie Louise Sachs (1910-1992)
    - Arthur Sachs (1880–1975)
    - Walter E. Sachs (1884–1980), banker (partner at Goldman Sachs 1928–1959), married to Mary Williamson (1911–1989; divorced 1960), actress
      - Katherine Russell Sachs (1943–) married Bernard Dan Steinberg June 7, 1964
      - Philip Williamson Sachs (1949–)
    - Ella Sachs Plotz (1888–1922)
  - Henry Goldman (1857–1937), banker, married to Babette Kaufman (1871–1954)
    - Florence Goldman (1891–1960), married to Edwin Chester Vogel (1884–1973)
    - Robert Goldman
    - Henry Goldman Jr., married to Adrienne Straus Goldman
      - June Breton Fisher (1927–2012), m. 1. J. Robert Breton 2. Maurice L. Fisher: author, wrote a biography on grandfather Henry Goldman (1857–1937).
        - Tracy Breton,
        - Brooke Breton,
        - Cynthia Breton,
        - Taylor Breton,
      - Henry Goldman III , married to Dolores Goldman,
        - Leslie Hicks (Goldman),
        - Lynne Vagt (Goldman),
        - Duane Goldman, married to Patricia Goldman,
          - Aphten L Sterling (Goldman),
          - Garret Goldman,
          - Avery J Ray (Goldman),

- Note: Bernard Sachs (1858–1944), neurologist, brother of Julius and Samuel Sachs.
