= Ernest Sachs Jr. =

American neurosurgeon (1916–2001)

- Born: October 2, 1916; St. Louis, Missouri, U.S.
- Died: December 3, 2001 (aged 85); Hanover, New Hampshire, U.S.
- Education: St. Louis Country Day School
- Alma mater: Harvard University
- Occupation: Neurosurgeon
- Spouse: Jeanne O'Sullivan
- Children: 4 sons, 2 daughters
- Parent(s): Ernest Sachs; Mary Parmly Koues
- Relatives: Marcus Goldman (maternal great-grandfather); Henry Goldman (maternal great-uncle); Bernard Sachs (paternal great-uncle); Samuel Sachs (paternal great-uncle); Julius Sachs (paternal grandfather); Soma Weiss (cousin)

Ernest Sachs Jr. (October 2, 1916 – December 3, 2001) was an American neurosurgeon. The great-grandson of Goldman Sachs's founder, he was a neurosurgeon at Dartmouth College's Hitchcock Medical Center for 30 years. He promoted the use of the seat belt from the early 1960s onward. He researched the cause of schizophrenia as well as Ramsay Hunt syndrome, brain tumors and head injuries.

== Early life ==
Ernest Sachs Jr. was born on October 2, 1916, in St. Louis, Missouri. His father, Ernest Sachs, was a neurosurgeon. His mother, Mary Sachs, was a playwright and poet. His brother, Dr. Thomas Dudley Sachs, was a PhD and a professor of physics at the University of Vermont. He also had a sister, Mary, who died in 1927. Sachs's great-grandfather, Marcus Goldman, was the founder of Goldman Sachs.

Sachs was educated at the St. Louis Country Day School in St. Louis. He graduated from Harvard University in 1938, and he received a medical degree from the Harvard Medical School in 1942. He was an intern under the supervisions of Drs Barney Brooks and Cobb Pilcher at the Vanderbilt University Medical Center.

Sachs joined the United States Army by the end of World War II, landing in Normandy in June 1944. He served in the Battle of the Bulge, and he was present at the liberation of the Buchenwald concentration camp. He was the recipient of the Bronze Star Medal for his service.

== Career ==
Sachs started his career as assistant professor of Neurosurgery and Neurology at Tulane University. One year later, he became a neurosurgeon at the Dartmouth–Hitchcock Medical Center on the campus of Dartmouth College in 1950. He subsequently served as the chair of the Department of Neurosurgery at Dartmouth College. He was a visiting professor of neurology at Ankara University in Turkey in the Spring semester of 1966. He served as a physician at the 1980 Winter Olympics.

Sachs researched the cause of schizophrenia. He also studied the Ramsay Hunt syndrome and its impact on the geniculate ganglion. Additionally, he studied the presence of the acetylcholine in the cerebrospinal fluid, and he "discovered serotonin in cases of brain tumors". Moreover, after seeing many cases of head injuries due to ski falls, Sachs researched materials to create protective helmets and reduce the risks of injuries.

Sachs supported the use of the seat belt in cars as early as 1963. By 1972, he was appointed to the New Hampshire Traffic Safety Commission. Additionally, he served as the president of the New England Neurosurgical Society. He was a Fellow of the American College of Surgeons.

== Personal life and death ==
Sachs married Jeanne O'Sullivan in 1943. They had four sons (Ernest Sachs, Christopher Sachs, James Sachs, and Robert D. Sachs) and two daughters (Ann Sachs and Patricia Sachs). They resided in Hanover, New Hampshire from 1950 to his death. Sachs was a member of the Harvard Club of New Hampshire, the Norford Lake Club, the Adirondack Forty-Sixers, and the Mars Society.

Sachs died on December 3, 2001. His funeral was held at the Rollins Chapel in Hanover, New Hampshire on December 8, 2001.
