= Paul J. Sachs =

American businessman and museum director

- Born: Paul Joseph Sachs; November 24, 1878; New York City
- Died: February 18, 1965 (aged 86); Cambridge, Massachusetts
- Education: Timothy Dwight School
- Alma mater: Harvard University
- Children: Elizabeth Sachs; Celia Sachs Robinson (m. to Charles A. Robinson Jr.); Marjorie Sachs
- Family: Marcus Goldman (grandfather); Julius Sachs (uncle); Bernard Sachs (uncle); Walter E. Sachs (brother)

Paul Joseph Sachs (November 24, 1878 – February 18, 1965) was an American investor, businessman and museum director. Sachs served as associate director of the Fogg Art Museum and as a partner in the financial firm Goldman Sachs. He is recognized for having developed one of the earliest museum studies courses in the United States.

== Biography ==
Sachs was born to a Jewish family, the eldest son of Louisa (née Goldman) and Samuel Sachs. His father having been a partner of the investment firm Goldman Sachs, and his mother, the daughter of the firm's founder Marcus Goldman. He attended the Sachs School, which was founded by his uncle Julius Sachs and which later became the Dwight School. He then continued his education at Harvard University, where he graduated in 1900.

As an undergraduate, Sachs collected prints and drawings with classmate Edward Waldo Forbes, who would eventually become director of Harvard University's Fogg Museum of Art in 1909. After graduating, Sachs went to work in the family business, becoming a partner in 1904. Sachs had been making donations to the Fogg since 1911, then only a small art collection consisting mostly of out-of-fashion American paintings and primitive Italian works. In 1912, Sachs was appointed to the museum's Visiting Committee. Two years later, Forbes persuaded Sachs to leave his family business to become an assistant curator, despite Sachs having no curatorial background. Sachs spent that summer in Italy seeing as much art as possible before his arrival at Harvard in the autumn of 1915.

Sachs began lecturing in art history from 1916 to 1917 at Wellesley College where he had been appointed "Lecturer in Art." He was made an assistant professor in the Fine Arts department at Harvard in 1917. In 1922, he began his innovative course on museum curatorship titled "Fine Arts 15a: Museum Work and Museum Problems.", dealing with both curatorial and financial aspects of running a museum. He was appointed full professor in 1927. Sachs set about developing a program of museum education, developing students as what he termed the "connoisseur-scholar." One course was commonly called "the Print Course," which featured a seminar-style analysis of prints and drawings drawn largely from Sachs' own personal collection. From 1935 onward, he served regularly as chair of the Fine Arts department.

In 1929, Sachs became one of seven founding members of the Museum of Modern Art and gave it its first drawing, a George Grosz portrait of the artist's mother.

During World War II, Sachs, along with disciple George L. Stout, was one of the people who developed plans to safeguard American works of art during the war, and one who set in motion the task force (later known as the Monuments Men) of American military officers who rescued European art and architecture during the war. In 1945, Sachs retired together from Fogg, while he remained on the teaching faculty of Harvard until 1948 when he was named a professor emeritus.

== Personal life and death ==
In 1904, he married Meta Pollak; they remained married until her death on December 25, 1960. They had three daughters: Elizabeth Pollak Weiss, Celia Robinson Stillwell (married to Charles Alexander Robinson Jr., and after his death to Richard Stillwell), and Marjorie Pickhardt Wilson. Sachs died in February 1965.

== Legacy ==
Many of Sachs' students would go on to become leading figures in the fields of museum and art including Chick Austin, Alfred H. Barr Jr., Frederick B. Deknatel, Sydney Joseph Freedberg, George M.A. Hanfmann, Julien Levy, Henry Plumer McIlhenny, Agnes Mongan, Walter Pach, Joseph Pulitzer Jr., Perry T. Rathbone, and James Rorimer.

== Honors ==
- Elected member of the American Academy of Arts and Sciences: 1922
- Honorary Doctorate from Harvard University: 1942
- Elected member of the American Philosophical Society: 1947

== See also ==
- Goldman–Sachs family
