= Ella Sachs Plotz =

American scientist

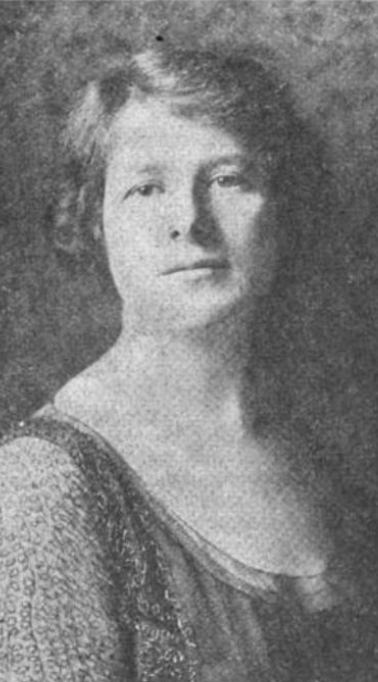
- Ella Sachs Plotz, from a 1922 publication
- Born: Ella Sophia Sachs; November 10, 1888; New York City, US
- Died: April 13, 1922 (aged 33); Paris, France
- Occupation: Philanthropist
- Known for: Ella Sachs Plotz Foundation
- Spouse: Harry Plotz
- Parent: Samuel Sachs
- Relatives: Goldman-Sachs family

Ella Sachs Plotz (November 10, 1888 – April 13, 1922) was an American philanthropist, for whom the Ella Sachs Plotz Foundation for the Advancement of Scientific Investigation was named after.

== Early life ==
Ella Sachs was born in New York City, the daughter of banker Samuel Sachs and Louisa Goldman Sachs. The extended Goldman–Sachs family was Jewish. Her father and maternal grandfather Marcus Goldman founded Goldman Sachs, an investment banking firm. Her eldest brother Paul J. Sachs was a professor of fine arts, and associate director of the Fogg Museum at Harvard University.

== Philanthropy and personal life ==
Sachs was elected to the board of directors of the National Urban League in 1915. During World War I she was a canteen worker in France, Italy, and England with the YMCA. She was a trustee of Fisk University.

Ella Sachs married physician and bacteriologist Henry (Harry) Plotz in 1920. Judge Benjamin Cardozo officiated at their wedding. She died in childbirth in 1922, aged 33 years, in Paris.

== Legacy ==
The Ella Sachs Plotz Foundation made hundreds of small cash grants to individual scientists worldwide, "toward the solution of problems in medicine and surgery or in branches of science bearing on medicine and surgery". Beneficiaries included biochemist Hans Krebs, neurosurgeon Roy Glenwood Spurling, and pharmacologist Henry Gray Barbour. The foundation's papers are in the Harvard Art Museums Archives, part of the Papers of Paul J. Sachs.

Plotz left the National Urban League $5000 in her will, and the Urban League created an Ella Sachs Plotz Fellowship program in her memory, open to Black students pursuing social work degrees. Recipients of the Plotz Fellowship included educator Ethel McGhee Davis and economist Abram Lincoln Harris.

In 1924, Fisk University established an Ella Sachs Plotz Professorship, endowed by a memorial gift from her brother.
