= Ernest Sachs =

American neurosurgeon (1879–1958)

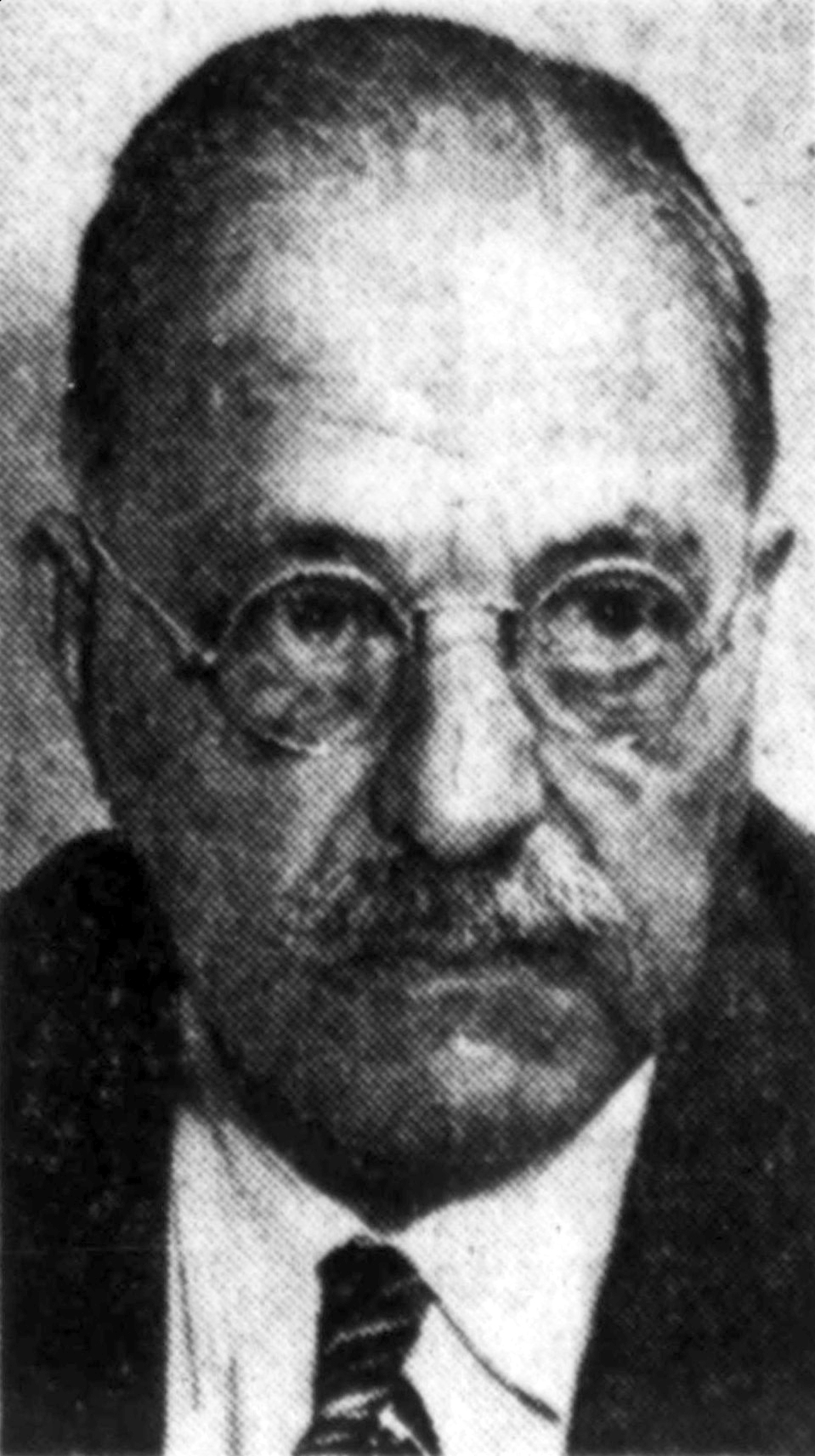
- Born: January 25, 1879; New York City, U.S.
- Died: December 2, 1958 (aged 79); New Haven, Connecticut, U.S.
- Education: Harvard University; Johns Hopkins School of Medicine
- Occupation: Neurosurgeon
- Employer(s): Washington University in St. Louis; Yale University
- Spouse: Mary Parmly Koues
- Children: 2 sons, 1 daughter
- Parent(s): Julius Sachs; Rosa Goldman
- Relatives: Marcus Goldman (maternal grandfather); Henry Goldman (maternal uncle); Bernard Sachs (paternal uncle); Samuel Sachs (paternal uncle)

Ernest Sachs (January 25, 1879 – December 2, 1958) was an American neurosurgeon. The grandson of Goldman Sachs's founder, he became Professor of Neurosurgery at the Washington University School of Medicine in St. Louis, Missouri, in 1919. He was president of The Society of Neurological Surgeons from 1925 to 1927, and president of the American Neurological Association in 1943. Together with Harvey Cushing, he is known as the Father of Neurosurgery.

== Early life ==
Ernest Sachs was born on January 25, 1879, in New York City. His father, Julius Sachs, was an educator. His mother, Rosa Goldman, was the daughter of Goldman Sachs's founder Marcus Goldman. He grew up in New York City, where he learned to play the cello from the age of six.

Sachs graduated from Harvard University in 1900. In 1904, he received a medical degree from the Johns Hopkins School of Medicine, where he was taught by Professor William Osler, and he completed his three-year residency under the supervision of Arpad Gester at Mount Sinai Hospital in 1907. He subsequently spent three more years in Vienna, Berlin and London, where he studied under Sir Victor Horsley and he wrote a treatise about the thalamus.

== Career ==
Sachs began practicing neurosurgery in New York City. In 1911, he moved to St. Louis, Missouri, where he taught neurosurgery at the Washington University School of Medicine. In 1919, he became the first Professor of Neurosurgery in the USA.

Sachs was a founding member of The Society of Neurological Surgeons, and he served as its Secretary-Treasurer from 1920 to 1924, and as its president from 1925 to 1927. He served as the president of the American Neurological Association in 1943. He also served on the board of directors of the American Board of Neurological Surgery. Additionally, Sachs was an honorary member of the Royal Society of Medicine and the Deutsche Akadamie der Naturforscher Leopoldina.

Sachs resigned from Washington University in 1949, and he became professor emeritus at the Yale School of Medicine.

== Personal life and death ==
Sachs married Mary Parmly Koues, a playwright and poet, in 1913. They had two sons, Ernest Sachs, Jr. and Thomas Dudley Sachs, and a daughter, Mary, who died in 1927.

Sachs died on December 2, 1958, in New Haven, Connecticut.

== Works ==
- Sachs, Ernest (1909). On the Structure and Functional Relations of the Optic Thalamus. London, U.K.: John Bale, Sons & Danielsson. OCLC 42636011.
- Sachs, Ernest (1945). The Care of the Neurosurgical Patient Before, During and After Operation. St. Louis, Missouri: The C.V. Mosby Company. OCLC 3180504.
- Sachs, Ernest (1949). Diagnosis and Treatment of Brain Tumors and Care of the Neurosurgical Patient. St. Louis, Missouri: Mosby. OCLC 1133529.
- Sachs, Ernest (1952). The History and Development of Neurological Surgery. New York: Hoeber. OCLC 6739979.
- Sachs, Ernest (1954). Prerequisites of Good Teaching & Other Essays. Hamden, Connecticut: Shoe String Press. OCLC 1548260.
- Sachs, Ernest (1958). Fifty Years of Neurosurgery: A Personal Story. New York: Vantage Press. OCLC 547712.
