= The American Journal of the Medical Sciences =

- Discipline: Medicine
- Language: English
- Edited by: Jesse Roman

Publication details
- Former names: Philadelphia Journal of the Medical and Physical Sciences
- History: 1820–present
- Publisher: Elsevier (United States)
- Frequency: Monthly
- Impact factor: 1.962 (2018)

Standard abbreviations
- ISO 4: Am. J. Med. Sci.

Indexing
- ISSN: 0002-9629 (print); 1538-2990 (web)

Links
- Journal homepage

The American Journal of the Medical Sciences is a monthly peer-reviewed medical journal.

== History ==
The journal was established in 1820 as the Philadelphia Journal of the Medical and Physical Sciences by Nathaniel Chapman. A new series was started in 1827 under the editorship of Chapman along with William Potts Dewees and John D. Godman. In 1827, the editorship passed to Isaac Hays, who gave it its present name, and helped make it one of the most important American medical journals of the 19th century.

In 1984, the Southern Society for Clinical Investigation became the journal's sponsor. In 1994, 21 percent of submissions came from outside the United States. On the 175th anniversary, the February 1, 1995 issue featured a photograph of Volume 1 from 1820, a brief history and three classic articles were critiqued by contemporary scholars:

- Leo Buerger "Thrombo-angiitis Obliterans: A Study of the Vascular Lesions Leading to Presenile Spontaneous Gan-grene," 136 (1908); critiqued by David A. Cutler and Marschall S. Runge of the University of Texas Medical Branch at Galveston
- E. Libman and H. L. Celler's "The Etiology of Subacute Infectious Endocarditis," - critiqued by Edward Hook Jr., of the University of Virginia
- Norman M. Keith, Henry P. Wagener and Nelson W Barker's "Some Different Types of Essential Hypertension and the Cause and Prognosis," critiqued by Harriet Dustan of the University of Alabama at Birmingham.

Regarding these critiques, Martinez-Maldonado said:

These were landmark articles that are known worldwide, because they were the first to address these issues, .... It's amazing that there has been little descriptive improvement on these original articles. We know more on the molecular level than they did, but as far as actual description goes, no one has done any better. ... This shows how clever and precise our ancestors were and their keen powers of observation.

== Modern journal ==
The American Journal of the Medical Sciences is currently published monthly by Elsevier. The 2018 impact factor was 1.962, with a rank of 65th of 160 medical journals. As of 2017, the editor in chief is Jesse Roman of Thomas Jefferson University, Philadelphia Pennsylvania.

== Notable contributors, notable articles ==
- Samuel George Morton published his first medical essay in the 1825 journal.
- Henry Jacob Bigelow. "Dr. Harlow's case of Recovery from the passage of an Iron Bar through the Head." 20:13-22 (1850). This was only the second significant article published on Phineas Gage and his 1848 accident, but the first to create significant awareness of the case, thanks to the American Journal's prominence. (The first article on Gage, by Dr. John Martyn Harlow himself, had appeared in 1848 in the Boston Medical & Surgical Journal, at the time arguably a less visible publication—though it is now the New England Journal of Medicine.)
- G. Kenneth Mallory and Soma Weiss described the first 15 cases of Mallory-Weiss syndrome in 1929.
