= Manuel Martínez Maldonado =

Puerto Rican nephrologist (born 1937)

- Born: Yauco, Puerto Rico
- Occupations: Nephrologist, educator, poet and author

Manuel Martínez Maldonado (born 1937) is a Puerto Rican physician, researcher, academic and poet.

He has worked in the field of nephrology with a focus on fluid regulation, electrolyte metabolism and physiology, and renal pharmacology. He has held administrative positions at several institutions, including Oregon Health and Science University, the Ponce School of Medicine, and the University of Louisville. His work has also included writing in both academic and literary contexts.

== Biography ==
Martínez Maldonado was born in Yauco, Puerto Rico. He received his primary education at Holy Rosary School in Yauco, St Joseph School in San Germán, and Holy Spirit School in Hato Rey. He attended Matienzo Cintron School in Santurce and J.J. Osuna School in Hato Rey for his secondary education and graduated as president of his class from University High School in 1954.

After graduating from high school, he entered the University of Puerto Rico, where he initially studied chemistry and literature.

He graduated magna cum laude and was accepted to Temple University School of Medicine (TUSM) in Philadelphia, Pennsylvania, where he earned his medical degree. After a residency in internal medicine at the San Juan Veterans Administration Medical Center and University Hospital, he completed his postdoctoral studies on renal and electrolyte metabolism at the University of Texas Southwestern Medical Center.

Martinez Maldonado became interested in renal physiology and nephrology and was accepted as a Fellow by the Dallas Southwestern Nephrology Division, where he developed into an investigator. He then became an independent investigator at Baylor College of Medicine in Houston, rising from assistant to full professor of medicine with tenure (1968–1973). Nephrology is a branch of internal medicine and pediatrics focused on studying the function and diseases of the kidney.

Martinez Maldonado is credited with developing a technique to measure the osmolality of nanoliter samples of proximal tubular fluids. He and his colleagues at Baylor designed a clinical treatment for hypercalcemia that was used until specific medications were developed for the condition in the early 2000s.

In 1973, Martínez Maldonado left his professorship at Baylor University to become Associate Chief of Staff for Research at the San Juan Veterans Administration Medical Center, and professor and Chair of the Department of Physiology, as well as Professor of Medicine at the University of Puerto Rico School of Medicine. From 2000 to 2009, he served as Executive Vice President for Research at the University of Louisville. Martínez-Maldonado has also served on various committees of the National Institutes of Health He has authored several hundred scientific publications.

Martínez Maldonado has served as a Member of the National Advisory Council for Arthritis, Metabolism, Kidney, and Digestive Diseases, US Dept. of Health & Human Services and on the Board of Scientific Counselors of the Division of Intramural Research, National Heart, Lung and Blood Institute, both at NIH. Also as a member of Member, Committee on Organ Procurement and Transplantation Policy of the Institute of Medicine, National Academies.

He is also a member of the Honor Medical Society, Alpha Omega Alpha.

== Personal life ==
Martínez Maldonado is married to Nivia E. Martínez. They have four children. Manuel, a physician, David, a lawyer, Ricardo, a business man and Pablo, and engineer.

== Selected publications ==
=== Books ===
- Maldonado, Manuel Martinez-, ed. (1976). Methods in Pharmacology: Volume 4A Renal Pharmacology (1st ed.). Springer. p. 398. ISBN 978-1-4615-8893-1.
- Martinez-Maldonado, Manuel, ed. (1978). Renal Pharmacology. doi:10.1007/978-1-4615-8894-8. ISBN 978-1-4615-8896-2.
- Maldonado, Manuel Martinez, ed. (1983). Handbook of Renal Therapeutics (1st ed.). Springer. p. 568. ISBN 978-1-4684-7262-2.
- Martinez Maldonado, Manuel; Rodicio, Jose Luis, eds. (1993). Tratado de Nefrologia. Capitel Ediciones, S.L. ISBN 978-84-7487-059-6.
- Eknoyan, Garabed (1985). Maldonado, Manuel Martinez (ed.). The Physiological basis of diuretic therapy in clinical medicine (1st ed.). Grune & Stratton. p. 406. ISBN 978-0-8089-1744-1.
- Maldonado Manuel, Martínez; Macías Núñez, Juan F., eds. (1990). Hipertension en Geriatria. S. Karger AG. OCLC 920185414.
- Martinez-Maldonado, Manuel, ed. (1992). Hypertension and renal disease in the elderly. Boston: Blackwell Scientific Publications. ISBN 978-0-86542-093-9.

=== Novels ===
- Martínez Maldonado, Manuel (1999). Isla Verde: El Chevy azul. Verbum narrativa. Madrid: Ed. Verbum. ISBN 978-84-7962-133-9.
- Martínez-Maldonado, Manuel (2012). El vuelo del dragón. Hato Rey, Puerto Rico: Terranova Editores. ISBN 978-1-935163-71-8.
- Martínez Maldonado, Manuel (2014). Del color de la muerte. Río Piedras, Puerto Rico: Publicaciones Gaviota. ISBN 978-1-61505-125-0.
- Martínez Maldonado, Manuel (2014). El imperialista ausente. San Juan, Puerto Rico: Instituto de Cultura Puertorriqueña. ISBN 978-0-86581-680-0.
- Martínez Maldonado, Manuel (2014). Solo la muerte tiene permanencia. Verbum. Madrid: Verbum. ISBN 978-84-9074-032-3.
- Martínez-Maldonado, Manuel (2019). El descubrimiento: novela (Primera edición ed.). San Juan, Puerto Rico: Publicaciones Gaviota. ISBN 978-1-61505-378-0.
- Martínez Maldonado, Manuel (2021). Ausencia: (modelo para un mito): novela (Primera edición ed.). Río Piedras, Puerto Rico: Publicaciones Gaviota. ISBN 978-1-61505-472-5.
- Maldonado, Manuel Martinez. HISTORIAS DE GUERRAS - Manuel Martínez Maldonado. ISBN 978-161-505-543-2.

=== Poetry ===
- La voz sostenida (1984)
- Palm Beach Blues (1986)
- Por amor al arte (1989)
- Maldonado, Manuel Martinez (January 1, 1999). Hotel María (Poesía) (Spanish ed.). verbum. p. 60. ISBN 978-84-7962-135-3.
- Maldonado, Manuel Martinez (January 1, 2004). Novela de Mediodía (Spanish ed.). Verbum. p. 28. ISBN 978-84-7962-305-0.
- Martínez-Maldonado, Manuel (2019). Breve es el amor (Primera edición ed.). San Juan, Puerto Rico: Publicaciones Gaviota. ISBN 978-1-61505-387-2.
- Maldonado, Manuel Martinez (2025). Isla entre mares y colinas (in Spanish) (Spanish ed.). Primera edición. ISBN 978-1-61505-611-8.

=== Essays ===
- Maldonado, Manuel Martinez (2023). Testigo: ver y pensar-Cine, arte y universidad. Publicaciones Gaviota. p. 358. ISBN 978-1-61505-520-3.
- Maldonado, Manuel Martinez (2025). Testigo 2: Nueva antología: Política, literatura, arte, ciencia e historia (in Spanish). Publicaciones Gaviota. p. 267. ISBN 978-1-61505-584-5.

== Awards ==
Martínez Maldonado was elected to the American Society for Clinical Investigation in 1973. He is a member of the Association of American Physicians, the Institute of Medicine of the National Academy of Sciences (now the National Academy of Medicine), the American Academy of Arts and Sciences, and a fellow of the American Association for the Advancement of Science. He was also a member of the American Board of Internal Medicine Nephrology panel, and a Master of the American College of Physicians.

He served on numerous boards of editors and was Chief Editor of The American Journal of the Medical Sciences (1994–98).

He is listed in Who's Who in America and Who's Who in the World and presided over the Southern Society for Clinical Investigation and the Latin American Society of Nephrology and Hypertension.

In 1975, while a Professor of Medicine and Physiology at the University of Puerto Rico, he was appointed Chief of Medical Services at the San Juan Veterans Administration Medical Center. In 1991, he was awarded the Founders Medal of the Southern Society for Clinical Investigations. In 1990, he was appointed Chief of the Medical Services at the Atlanta VA Center, as well as Professor and Vice Chair of the Department of Medicine at Emory University. Later, at OHSU in Portland, Oregon, he contributed to the creation of the Vaccine and Gene Therapy Center. In 2000, Martínez Maldonado was named president and dean of the Ponce School of Medicine, where he obtained full accreditation and improved its finances. In 2006, he was selected as the executive vice president for research at the University of Louisville, overseeing the building and completion of the Center for Predictive Medicine, a level 3 biodefense laboratory in the United States.

== See also ==
- List of Puerto Ricans
- Puerto Rican scientists and inventors
