= Ashton Sanborn =

American archaeologist and museum director

- Born: March 13, 1882; Rochester, New Hampshire, U.S.
- Died: June 22, 1970 (aged 88); Cambridge, Massachusetts, U.S.
- Education: Somerville Latin High School
- Alma mater: Harvard University
- Occupations: Archaeologist, museum director
- Spouse: Agnes Goldman
- Children: 1 daughter
- Parent(s): George Hobbs Sanborn; Lillian Knight Hodgdon
- Relatives: Hetty Goldman (sister-in-law)

Ashton Sanborn (13 March 1882 in Rochester, New Hampshire, USA – 22 June 1970 in Cambridge, Massachusetts, USA) was an American archaeologist and museum director. He was the executive secretary of the American Red Cross Commission to Palestine from 1918 to 1919. He went on archaeological expeditions to Egypt in the 1920s. He served as the secretary of the Museum of Fine Arts, Boston from 1925 to 1952. He was the editor of the American Journal of Archaeology.

== Early life ==
Ashton Sanborn was born on March 13, 1882, in Rochester, New Hampshire. He was son of George Hobbs Sanborn and Lillian Knight Hodgdon. His father died when he was six years old, in 1888.

Sanborn was educated at the Somerville Latin High School in Somerville, Massachusetts. He graduated from Harvard University in 1905, where he received a Master of Arts degree in 1908. He was a Fellow at the American School of Classical Studies at Athens from 1909 to 1912. He also attended the Ludwig-Maximilians-Universität München from 1913 to 1914.

== Career ==
Sanborn was archaeologist Lacey Davis Caskey's assistant from 1913 to 1915. He was also James Loeb's assistant at the Ludwig-Maximilians-Universität München. He also taught Latin, Greek and Latin at the Foster School in Litchfield, Connecticut. From 1918 to 1919, he served as the executive secretary of the American Red Cross Commission to Palestine, where he was based in Jerusalem. In 1920, Sanborn was on an expedition to the tomb of Merenptah with Eckley Brinton Coxe, Jr. and Clarence Stanley Fisher, where they found Pharaoh's throne. He served as Dr George Andrew Reisner's editorial secretary from 1920 to 1925.

Sanborn served as the librarian of the Museum of Fine Arts, Boston from 1923 to 1925, and as its secretary from 1925 to 1952. He served as the editor of the Boston Museum Bulletin from 1925 to 1952, and later editor of the American Journal of Archaeology.

== Personal life ==
Sanborn married Agnes Goldman, the granddaughter of rabbi Samuel Adler and Goldman Sachs's founder Marcus Goldman; they met in Palestine and married on December 25, 1924. They had a daughter, Sarah Sanborn. They resided at 147 Brattle Street in Cambridge, Massachusetts from 1940 to 1970.

== Death ==
Sanborn died on June 22, 1970, in Cambridge, Massachusetts.
