= Isaac Hayes (disambiguation) =

Isaac Hayes (1942–2008) was an American singer, actor, and producer.

Isaac Hayes may also refer to:

- Isaac Hayes III (born 1975), American record producer and son of the singer
- Isaac Israel Hayes (1832–1881), arctic explorer

== See also ==
- Isaac Hays, American ophthalmologist, medical ethicist, and naturalist
