= SSCI =

SSCI may refer to:

- Social Sciences Citation Index
- Southern Society for Clinical Investigation
- United States Senate Select Committee on Intelligence
