= Soma Weiss =

American physician

- Born: January 27, 1898; Bistriţa, Transylvania,
- Died: January 31, 1942 (aged 44); Boston, Massachusetts, U.S.
- Occupation: Physician
- Known for: describing the Mallory-Weiss syndrome
- Relatives: Ernest Sachs Jr. (cousin)

Soma Weiss (January 27, 1898 – January 31, 1942) was a Hungarian-born American physician known for describing the Mallory–Weiss syndrome with George Kenneth Mallory.

== Early life ==
Soma Weiss was born in 1898 in Bistriţa, Transylvania, Austro-Hungarian Empire. He studied physiology and biochemistry in Budapest. Immediately after the end of World War I, he immigrated to the United States and qualified in medicine in 1923. He was of Jewish ancestry.

Ernest Sachs Jr., a neurosurgeon who was Goldman Sachs's founder Marcus Goldman's great-grandson, was Weiss's cousin.

== Career ==
After initially working at Cornell University, Weiss moved to Harvard Medical School (HMS) in 1925, and in 1939 became physician-in-chief at Peter Bent Brigham Hospital (which merged to form Brigham and Women's Hospital in 1980) and Hersey Professor of the Theory and Practice of Physic at HMS. He published more than 200 peer-reviewed articles, the majority relating to cardiovascular diseases and pharmacology.

== Death ==
Weiss died suddenly on January 31, 1942. He had developed a sudden, excruciating and enduring headache which he recognized as a ruptured intracranial aneurysm; he made it home, where he was briefly cared for by medical staff he had trained, but soon died.

== Legacy ==
In April 1940, Weiss worked with his students, which included his cousin (and future neurosurgeon) Ernest Sachs Jr., to launch the Harvard Medical School (HMS) Undergraduate Research Assembly; after Weiss's death, it was renamed the Soma Weiss Student Research Day. The Scholars in Medicine Office of HMS sponsors the annual forum, which "provides students with an opportunity to present their scholarly work and share their findings with faculty and fellow students through poster sessions." The schedule includes presentations of posters and papers, the presentation of a number of student prizes, the announcing of a student scholarship, and the presentation of mentoring awards to professors awards; as of the 80th Soma Weiss Student Research Day, held virtually (due to COVID-19 pandemic in Massachusetts) on 16 March 2020, the awards included:

- Robert Ebert Prize for Health Care Delivery Research or Service
- Leon Eisenberg Prize for Medicine in Society Research
- Judah Folkman Prize for Clinical/Translational Science Research
- Elizabeth D. Hay Prize for Basic Science Research
- Charles Janeway Prize for International Research or Service
- Martin Prince Scholarship for Student Innovation
- Scholars in Medicine Excellence in Mentoring Awards

== Medical achievements ==
- He was the first to describe the carotid sinus hypersensitivity syndrome
- In 1925, with Hermann Blumgart performed the first application of in-vivo circulating blood radioactive tracers
- In 1929, with G. Kenneth Mallory described hemorrhagic lacerations of the cardiac orifice of the stomach due to vomiting: Mallory-Weiss syndrome
- In 1942, Weiss published a classic in the history of medicine describing the self-observations of Alfred S. Reinhart, a Harvard Medical School student with subacute bacterial endocarditis.
