= Trappstadt =

- Municipality
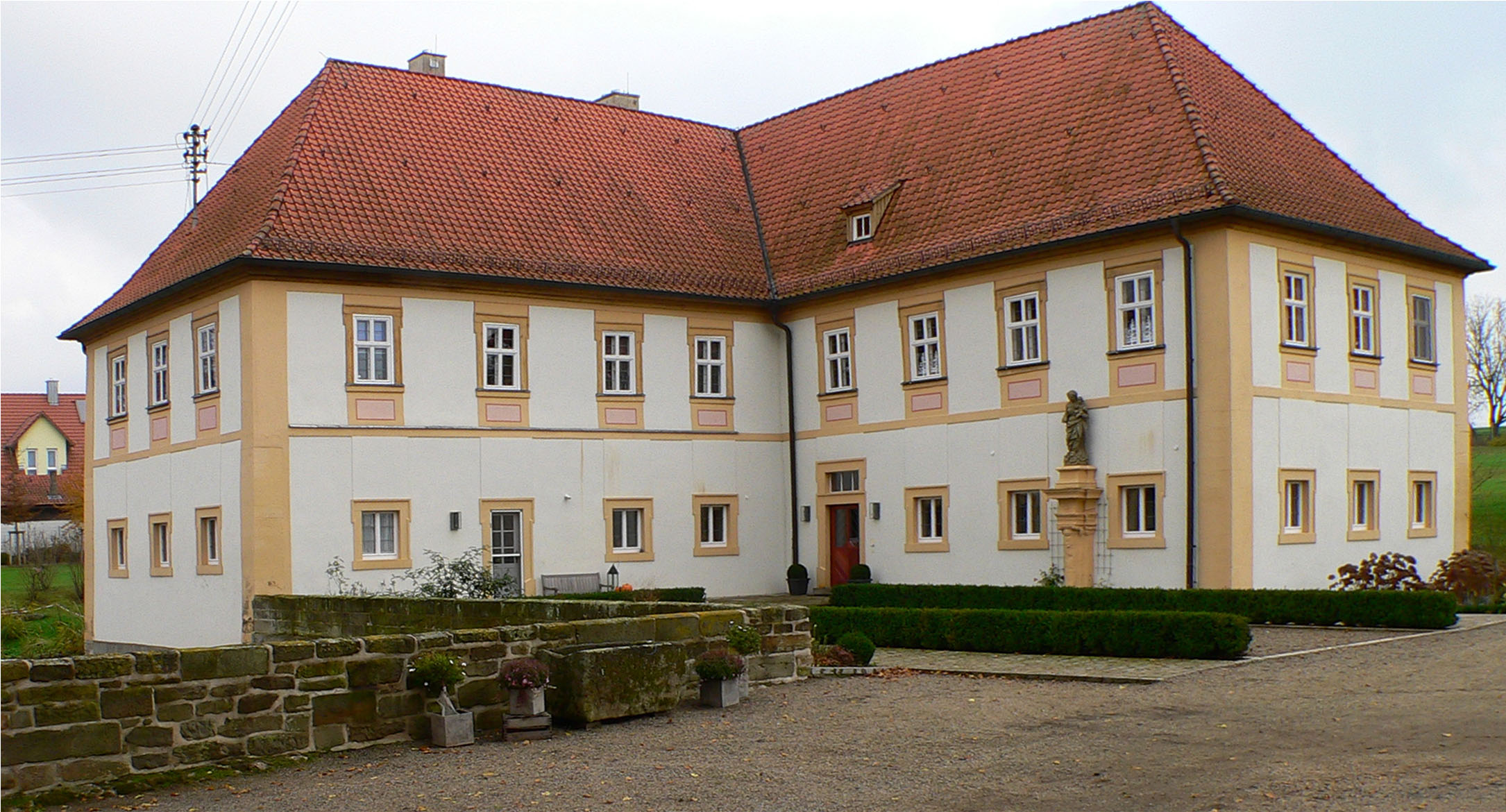
- Neues Schloss Trappstadt, built about 1710 by Joseph Greissing, Bibra family

- Coat of arms

- Location of Trappstadt within Rhön-Grabfeld district
- Interactive map of Trappstadt
- Location within Germany Location within Bavaria
- Coordinates: 50°19′N 10°35′E
- Country: Germany
- State: Bavaria
- Admin. region: Unterfranken
- District: Rhön-Grabfeld
- Municipal assoc.: Bad Königshofen im Grabfeld

Government
  - Mayor (2020–26): Michael Custodis

Area
  - Total: 25.79 km^{2} (9.96 sq mi)
- Elevation: 310 m (1,020 ft)

Population (2025-12-31)
  - Total: 869
  - Density: 33.7/km^{2} (87.3/sq mi)
- Time zone: UTC+01:00 (CET)
  - Summer (DST): UTC+02:00 (CEST)
- Postal codes: 97633
- Dialling codes: 09765
- Vehicle registration: NES
- Website: www.trappstadt.de

Trappstadt (German pronunciation: [ˈtʁapʃtat]) is a municipality in the district of Rhön-Grabfeld in Bavaria, Germany.

== Ganerbschaft ==
Trappstadt was a Ganerbschaft which was joint family estate, over which the co-heirs (Ganerben) only had rights in common. In the 13th century Trappstadt was divided by the counts of Henneberg and the monasteries of Theres and Veilsdorf. Three hundred years later in 1524, there were already twelve Ganerben issued.

The possession of the Ganerben quarters were divided as follows:

- The residents of Würzburg (former Theres Abbey) had 22 houses.
- Monastery Veilsdorf (from 1699 cathedral chapter of Würzburg) had 28 houses.
- Henneberg family (from 1584 Saxony) had 22 houses.
- Nine houses since 1524 were owned: Schott (until 1585), Echter (until 1665), Faust von Stromberg (until 1738), Grafen von Eltz until 1824).

== Notable people ==
- Joseph Brunner (26 November 1706 - 19 November 1827), born in Trappstadt and died in Altenstein. It has been suggested that he was the oldest man in the world but new information suggests that he may have been born in 1739
- Marcus Goldman (9 December 1821 - 20 July 1904), born in Trappstadt and died in New York City. He was the founder of the investment bank Goldman Sachs.
