= Botsford =

Botsford may refer to:

== Places ==
- Botsford, Connecticut, United States
- Botsford Parish, New Brunswick, Canada

== People ==
- Amos Botsford (1744–1812), early New Brunswick politician
- George Botsford (1874–1949), American composer
- George Willis Botsford (1862–1917), American classicist and history professor
- Keith Botsford (1928–2018) American/European writer and professor
- Margot Botsford (born 1947), Massachusetts judge

== Fictional characters ==
- Becky Botsford, heroine of WordGirl television series
