= Mary Sachs =

American poet

Mary Koues Sachs
- Born: Mary Parmly Koues; 1882
- Died: December 24, 1973 (aged 91); Hanover, New Hampshire, U.S.
- Other name: Nickname: "Maisie"
- Education: Smith College
- Occupations: Playwright, poet
- Spouse: Ernest Sachs (m. 1913; died 1958)
- Children: 1 daughter, 2 sons, including Ernest Sachs Jr. and Thomas Dudley Sachs
- Relatives: Julius Sachs (father-in-law)

Mary Sachs (1882–1973) was an American playwright and poet.

== Biography ==
Mary Sachs was born Mary Parmly Koues on October 26, 1882. She graduated from Smith College in 1912, where she was a member of Phi Beta Kappa society.

Sachs published her first play, The Twelfth Disciple, about Judas. The play was performed on Broadway. She subsequently composed poetry. Her poetry collection entitled Echoes, which included poems she wrote between 1898 and 1966, was published in 1967.

Sachs supported women's suffrage in the United States. She was a charter member of the League of Women Voters.

Sachs married Ernest Sachs, a neurosurgeon and the grandson of Goldman Sachs's founder, in 1913 They had a daughter and two sons: Mary Parmly Sachs, Thomas Dudley Sachs and Ernest Sachs Jr. They resided in Hanover, New Hampshire. She became a widow in 1958.

Sachs died on December 24, 1973, in Hanover, New Hampshire. She was 91 years old.
