= Alice Leslie Walker =

- Born: June 26, 1885; San Francisco, California
- Died: June 25, 1954 (aged 68); Santa Barbara, California
- Education: Vassar College, University of California, Berkeley
- Known for: Expertise on the Neolithic Period in Southern Greece
- Spouse: Georgios A. Kosmopoulos
- Scientific career
- Fields: Archaeology
- Workplaces: American School of Classical Studies at Athens

Alice "Mopsie" Leslie Walker (June 26, 1885 – June 25, 1954) was an American archeologist and leading expert on the Neolithic Period in Southern Greece. She was a gifted linguist. Besides speaking English, she spoke French, German, Portuguese, Latin and Ancient and Modern Greek. She and Hetty Goldman were the first two women to direct an archeological dig in mainland Greece.

== Early life and education ==
Alice Leslie Walker was born on June 26, 1885, to Josephine Kinney and James Greig Walker in San Francisco, California. She attended Vassar College and obtained her AB degree with honours in Greek language and Greek Archeology in 1906 and an MA in 1908.

== Archeological career ==
Walker attended the American School of Classical Studies in Athens from 1909 to 1914 on a fellowship in archeology. In 1910 she worked on publishing all the pottery finds of the Byzantine era excavated at Corinth.

In the spring of 1911, Walker and Hetty Goldman, both financially independent, excavated at Halae at Locris at their own expense. Goldman and Walker were the first two women to lead an excavation in mainland Greece. They established their field site at the city of Theologu, an area where relics were being sold by local villagers. The two women supervised laborers in digging for skeletons and the remains of homes from the era 1000 BC. "Foundations of houses were unearthed. Terra cotta statuary was found in large quantities. The foundations of a Byzantine church of the twelfth of thirteenth century was encountered."

The work on the project continued in 1912, but was halted due to the Balkans Wars. in 1914 they were back in Athens working at the American School on their excavation finds. In 1913 Walker became ill with Malaria and due to her inability to tolerate quinine, she lost a good part of her hearing and suffered ill effects from the disease for the rest of her life. In 1914 and 1915, Goldman and Walker were at Corinth excavating. Walker uncovered "the largest and probably still the most significant deposit of Early Neolithic pottery from Corinth." The archeological dig was interrupted by the beginning of World War I. She obtained her PHD at the University of California, Berkeley in 1917. Her dissertation was on "The Pottery of the Necropolis of Locrian Halae". It was never published.

She worked diligently to improve the lives of women at the American School, encouraging the administration to provide housing for women at the school. Being financially independent, she also became a major donor of the school. During the 1920s, Walker worked on the pottery uncovered at Corinth at Corinth's expedition headquarters. Working on excavations until 1935, Walker continued to add artifacts to her new finds of pottery of the Neolithic period. At this point in her career, she had become the foremost expert of the Neolithic Period in Southern Greece.

There was a great deal of tension during this time period between Acting Director of the American School, Edward Capps and Walker. He had continued to press for publication on the Corinth pottery and Walker continued to delay publishing her findings. In 1921, Walker's plan to dig at Halal in the fall had to be cancelled due to a recurrence of her illness. In 1924, she married her expedition foreman Georgios A. KosmopoulosIn. In 1924–1925 she was in Corinth working on prehistoric pottery.

Walker continued to work on the Corinth Pottery thru the late 1920s and 1930s and also continued to delay publication. There were new conflicts between the American School's new director in 1936, Charles H. Morgan II over Walker moving the Corinth material that belonged to the American School to the Museum of Athens. Morgan demanded the return of the Corinth property and Walker responded by sending some material back to the American School and hiding other material in boxes labeled for a different site. This material stayed hidden until it was discovered in the Athen's museum storeroom in the 1980s in a crate labeled "Halae"

The outbreak of World War II halted Walker's archeological work, and she and her husband moved back to the United States. They lived in Santa Barbara for the remainder of their lives. The bitterness on Walker's part toward the American School at the time she left Athens, led her to have her work finally published by a German publisher rather than the American School.

Walker died in Santa Barbara June 25, 1954.

== Selected bibliography ==
- Report on Excavations at Halae of Locris, Journal of Archeology, Vol. 19, No. 34 (1915), pp 418–437
- The Prehistoric Inhabitation of Corinth. Volume 1, Leipzig, München Münchner Verlag, 1948
- Banks, Jeffrey. « Alice Leslie Walker Kosmopoulos: A pioneer against all odds ». Pencil and Dust. Women Who Shaped Archaeology in Greece and the Greek World, Sylviane Déderix and Maguelone Bastide (eds), École française d’Athènes, 2025, https://doi.org/10.4000/15xfd.
