= Bernard Sachs =

American physician

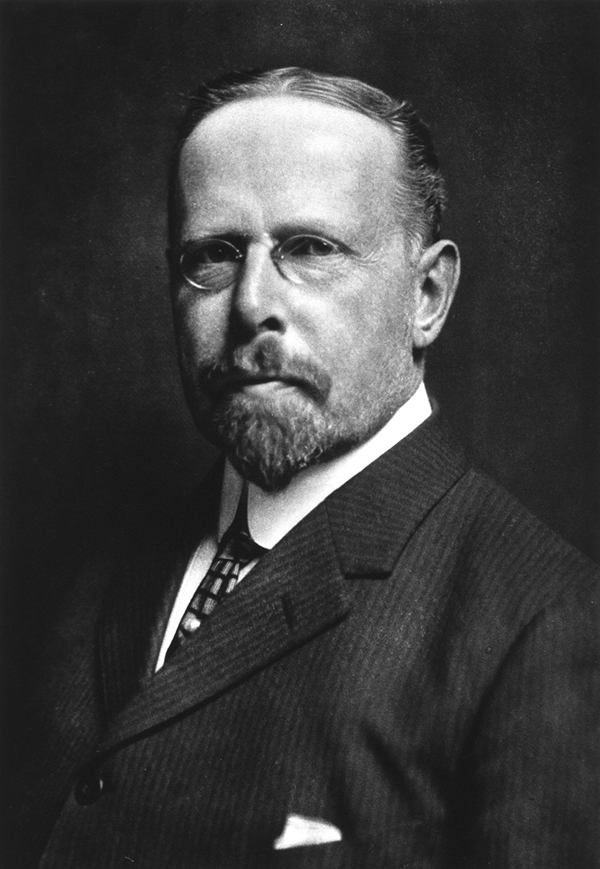
- Bernard Sachs, an American neurologist.
- Born: January 2, 1858; Baltimore, Maryland
- Died: February 8, 1944 (aged 86); New York City
- Spouse(s): Bertha Stein (w. 1940); Rosetta Kaskel
- Scientific career
- Fields: Neurology
- Doctoral advisor: Friedrich Goltz

Bernard Sachs (January 2, 1858 – February 8, 1944) was an American neurologist.

== Early life and education ==
Sachs was born on January 2nd, 1856 in New York City. His family was of German-Jewish origins. After graduating with a B.A. from Harvard in 1878, Sachs travelled to Europe and studied under some of the more prominent physicians of the time, such as Adolf Kussmaul, Friedrich Daniel von Recklinghausen, Friedrich Goltz, Rudolf Virchow, Karl Friedrich Otto Westphal, Theodor Meynert, Jean-Martin Charcot, and John Hughlings Jackson. Later, in 1885, Sachs translated Meynert's classic treatise Psychiatrie into English.

== Career ==
After returning to the United States, he settled into a private practice in New York, and became one of America's leading clinical neurologists. He was an instructor at New York Polyclinic Hospital, and a consultant at Mount Sinai Hospital, the Montefiore Home for Chronic Disease, and Manhattan State Hospital. In addition, he was publisher of the Journal of Nervous and Mental Disease (1886–1911) and president of the American Neurological Association (1894 and 1932).

The condition known as Tay–Sachs disease is named after Sachs along with English ophthalmologist Waren Tay. Tay first described the red spot on the retina of the eye in 1881, while Sachs provided a more comprehensive description of the disease, and in 1887 noted its higher occurrence in Ashkenazi Jews from Eastern Europe.

Sachs published several books, including Nervous and Mental Disorders from Birth through Adolescence, a reference work intended for professionals. In 1926 he published The Normal Child, a popular manual on child rearing intended for the general public. In the latter book he advocated a common-sense approach to parenting and the rejection of psychological theories, especially Freudian psychology.

== Personal life ==
His portrait was painted in the winter of 1914–15 by the Swiss-born American artist Adolfo Müller-Ury (1862–1947), but is presently unlocated. Another portrait, by Marie Rosenthal-Hatschek (1871–1942), hangs in the Oskar Diethelm Library at Weill Cornell Medical College.

Sachs, of the notable Goldman–Sachs family, was the son of Joseph Sachs and Sophia Baer. His older brother Samuel Sachs, was a co-founder of Goldman Sachs. His eldest brother Julius Sachs was a notable educator at Columbia University and founded Sachs Collegiate Institute. His nephew, Ernest Sachs (1879–1958), also became a notable physician. His daughter Helen married Nathan Straus Jr.

== Publications by Sachs concerning Tay–Sachs disease ==
- "On arrested cerebral development, with special reference to its cortical pathology", in:
- – Journal of Nervous and Mental Disease, Chicago, 1887; 14: 541–553.
- – Journal of Nervous and Mental Disease, Chicago, 1892, 17: 603–607.
- – Journal of Nervous and Mental Disease, Chicago, 1896, 21: 475–479.
- "Amaurotic Family Idiocy (Tay–Sachs disease)" in: "Modern medicine: its theory and practice, in original contributions by American and foreign authors", edited by William Osler, assisted by Thomas McCrae. Philadelphia and New York: Lea & Febiger, 7 volumes, 1907–1910. Volume 7, chapter XXI, pp. 868–874.

== See also ==
- Ira Van Gieson (1866–1913), a collaborator
