= Walter E. Sachs =

American banker and financier (1884–1980)

- Born: Walter Edward Sachs; May 28, 1884; Manhattan, New York City
- Died: August 21, 1980 (aged 96); Darien, Connecticut
- Occupations: Investment banker, Financier
- Spouse: Mary Williamson (1911–?) (m. 1939; div. 1960)
- Parent(s): Samuel Sachs; Louisa Goldman
- Family: Goldman–Sachs family

Walter Edward Sachs (May 28, 1884 – August 21, 1980) was an American banker and financier.

== Biography ==
He was born on May 28, 1884, in Manhattan, New York City, to Samuel Sachs and Louisa Goldman of the Goldman–Sachs family. He was an alumnus of Harvard Business School.

Sachs was a partner at Goldman Sachs starting in 1928, guiding the company through the Great Depression.

He married Mary Williamson in 1939. They moved into a house at 49 East 80th Street in Manhattan in 1942. They divorced in 1960.

He retired as a partner in 1959 to become a limited partner. He died at his home in Darien, Connecticut, on August 21, 1980.
