= Hetty Goldman =

American archaeologist (1881–1972)

- Born: December 19, 1881; New York City, U.S.
- Died: May 4, 1972 (aged 90); Princeton, New Jersey, U.S.
- Education: Bryn Mawr College; Radcliffe College
- Occupation: Archaeologist
- Parent(s): Julius Goldman; Sarah Adler
- Relatives: Marcus Goldman (paternal grandfather); Samuel Adler (maternal grandfather); Ashton Sanborn (brother-in-law)

Hetty Goldman (December 19, 1881 – May 4, 1972) was an American archaeologist. She was the first woman faculty member at the Institute for Advanced Study and one of the first female archaeologists to undertake excavations in Greece and the Middle East.

== Biography ==
Hetty Goldman was born on December 19, 1881, in New York City. She was a member of the Goldman–Sachs banking family. Her father was Julius Goldman, a lawyer, her mother was Sarah (Adler) Goldman, a homemaker.

Goldman graduated in 1903 from Bryn Mawr College, where she took a double major in English and Greek. She went on to study archaeology at Radcliffe College, where she was the first woman to hold the Charles Eliot Norton Fellowship from Harvard in order to study at the American School of Classical Studies at Athens. She received her PhD in 1916, having written a thesis entitled The Terracottas from the Necropolis of Halae.

In 1936, Goldman was the first woman to be appointed to the Institute for Advanced Study as a professor. She retired in 1947.

Goldman was elected a Fellow of the American Academy of Arts and Sciences in 1950. In 1966, the Archaeological Institute of America awarded her the Gold Medal Award for Distinguished Archaeological Achievement.

Goldman died May 4, 1972, in Princeton, New Jersey.

== See also ==
- Mary Hamilton Swindler
