= Henry Goldman =

American investment banker (1857–1937)

- Born: September 21, 1857; Philadelphia, Pennsylvania, U.S.
- Died: April 4, 1937 (aged 79); New York City, U.S.
- Resting place: Salem Fields Cemetery, Brooklyn
- Education: Harvard University (did not graduate)
- Occupations: Banker, philanthropist, art collector
- Spouse: Babette Kaufman Goldberg (m. 1890)
- Children: 2 sons, 1 daughter
- Parent: Marcus Goldman

Henry Goldman (September 21, 1857 – April 4, 1937) was an American heir, banker, philanthropist and art collector. A member of the Goldman–Sachs family, he was instrumental in the making of the financial conglomerate Goldman Sachs in the early twentieth century.

== Early life ==
Henry Goldman was born on September 21, 1857, in Philadelphia, Pennsylvania. His father, Marcus Goldman, was a German-born banker.

Goldman attended Harvard University but failed to graduate due to poor eyesight. Others believe this story of "poor eyesight" was family lore, and that Goldman, as a second-generation German immigrant and a Jew, did not feel welcome at Harvard.

== Career ==
Goldman started his career at Goldman Sachs in 1884.

Goldman helped list retail companies like Sears and Woolworth, despite the firms' shortage of assets. In 1911, when the firm joined with Lehman Brothers in refinancing and incorporating Studebaker, Henry served with great dedication on the automaker's executive committee.

Goldman broke with his brother-in-law and main partner Samuel Sachs and the bank during World War I. In 1915, as tensions rose in Europe, Goldman publicly voiced support for the Germans and refused to allow Goldman Sachs to participate in a $150 million Anglo-French bond issue arranged by J. P. Morgan. The rest of Goldman's colleagues supported the Allies. In 1917, after America entered the war, Goldman resigned as a partner from Goldman Sachs in recognition of the negative effects of this irreconcilable difference of opinion.

Goldman retired from Goldman Sachs in 1917.

Additionally, Goldman served on the Boards of Directors of the Lawyers Title and Trust Company, the Columbia Trust Company, the Commercial Investment Trust Corporation, and the Berlin-based Shrebreuger Technishe Hochschule.

== Philanthropy ==
Goldman remained a strong supporter of Germany until 1933, when, during a yearly trip to Berlin, he witnessed firsthand the increasingly brutal and institutionalized anti-Semitism that prevailed in the country. Goldman never returned to Germany. Until his death in 1937, Goldman worked to help German Jewish intellectuals and child refugees immigrate to the U.S. to escape the Nazis.

Goldman helped to fund the Stern–Gerlach experiment in quantum physics, and purchased a yacht for Albert Einstein (which was later confiscated by the Nazis). He also purchased a Stradivarius for Yehudi Menuhin.

With six other New Yorkers, Goldman endowed a US$150,000 chair in German Art and Culture at his alma mater, Harvard University.

== Art collection ==
Goldman was a significant art collector. His collection focused on "Renaissance Italian, Dutch and Flemish paintings." For example, he purchased Portrait of a Man Sitting by Frans Hals for US$175,000 in 1916.

== Personal life ==
Goldman married Babette Kaufman Goldberg. They resided at 998 Fifth Avenue in Manhattan, New York City. They had two sons, Robert Goldman and Henry Goldman Jr., and a daughter, Florence Vogel.

== Death ==
Goldman died on April 4, 1937, in New York City. He was 79 years old. He was buried at the Salem Fields Cemetery in Brooklyn, New York.
