= Charles Alexander Robinson Jr. =

American classical scholar (1900–1965)

Charles A. Robinson Jr.
- Born: March 30, 1900; Princeton, New Jersey
- Died: February 23, 1965 (aged 64); Providence, Rhode Island
- Spouse: Celia Sachs (m. 1927)

Academic background
- Education: Princeton University

Academic work
- Discipline: Classical studies
- Institutions: Brown University

Charles Alexander Robinson Jr. (March 30, 1900 – February 23, 1965) was an American classical scholar. The son of Princeton classics professor Charles A. Robinson, he graduated from Princeton in 1922. He spent post-graduate years at the American Academy in Rome, where he met Celia Sachs, daughter of art historian Paul J. Sachs. He excavated at Corinth in the 1920s under T. Leslie Shear.

Robinson later became a professor at Brown University. Some of his books are: Alexander the Great (1947), Ancient History (1st edition 1951, 2nd edition 1967, 3rd edition 1981 — used as a textbook in many colleges for many years), The Spring of Civilization (1954), Athens in the Age of Pericles (1959), and Hellenic History (1939), which he rewrote and revised from G. W. Botsford's 1922 book, and was updated in 1969 by Donald Kagan following Robinson's death.

He also published a series of "first books" that introduced children to classical history through text, photographs, drawings, and maps. Several were dedicated "For my grandchildren" and one "To My Daughters-in-law." The series from publisher Franklin Watts included The First Book of Ancient Rome (1959), The First Book of Ancient Egypt (1961), The First Book of the Ancient Bible Lands (1962), The First Book of Ancient Mesopotamia and Persia (1962), and The First Book of Ancient Crete & Mycenae (1964).

The Charles Alexander Robinson Jr., Memorial Lecture was inaugurated at Brown University in 1965 and given annually since by a distinguished, senior scholar on a topic of broad interest to scholars, students, and community members.

The Charles A. Robinson Memorial Trophy is an award given by Brown University to the ice hockey letterman attaining the highest academic average for his first seven semesters. It has been presented annually since its inception in 1966.

== Personal life ==
In June 1927, he married Celia Sachs, daughter of Paul J. Sachs; they had three sons: Charles Alexander Robinson III, Samuel Sachs Robinson, and Franklin W. Robinson.
