= George Willis Botsford =

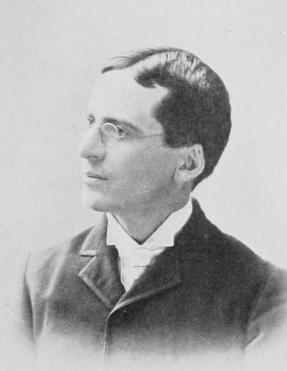
- c. 1899
- Born: May 9, 1862; West Union, Iowa, US
- Died: December 13, 1917 (aged 55); New York, New York, US
- Education: University of Nebraska; Johns Hopkins University
- Occupation: Historian
- Spouse: Lillie M. Shaw (m. 1891)
- Children: 2

George Willis Botsford (May 9, 1862 – December 13, 1917) was an American classicist, ancient historian, and professor of history, specializing in Greek and Roman history. He is known for his textbooks on Greek and Roman history.

== Biography ==
George Willis Botsford was born in West Union, Iowa on May 9, 1862. He graduated from the University of Nebraska in 1884 with an A.B. and in 1889 with an A.M. From 1884 to 1886 he studied at Johns Hopkins University. From 1886 to 1890 he was a professor of Greek at Kalamazoo College. In 1891 he graduated with a Ph.D. from Cornell University. His Ph.D. dissertation The Development of the Athenian Constitution was published in 1893.

From 1891 to 1893 he was an instructor at Worcester Academy. From 1893 to 1895 he was a professor of Greek at Bethany College in West Virginia. At Harvard University he was an instructor from 1895 to 1901. At Columbia University he was from 1902 to 1903 a lecturer in ancient history, from 1903 to 1905 an instructor, from 1905 to 1910 an adjunct professor, and from 1910 a full professor, retaining his professorship until his death. On December 13, 1917, Botsford died suddenly in his office at Columbia University.

For many years Botsford was on the editorial board of the Political Science Quarterly. He published articles in the Classical Review, The American Historical Review, The Mentor Magazine, The Nation, and the Encyclopaedia Britannica. His textbooks on Greek and Roman history gained prominence in secondary schools and colleges. In connection with his scholarly research he travelled to Italy and Greece.

He married Lillie M. Shaw on August 30, 1891 in Kalamazoo, Michigan. They had a son and a daughter. Their son, Jay Barrett Botsford (1893–1938), became a history professor at Brown University.

== Selected publications ==
- A History of Greece for High Schools and Academies. 1899. Botsford, George Willis (1899). 1901 reprint.
- Botsford, George Willis (1901). A History of Rome for High Schools and Academies.
- A History of the Orient and Greece for High Schools and Academies. 1901.
- Botsford, George Willis (1902). An Ancient History for Beginners.
- Botsford, George Willis; Shaw Botsford, Lillie M. (1903). The Story of Rome as Greeks and Romans Tell It. with Lillie Shaw Botsford
- The Roman Assemblies from the Origin to the End of the Republic. Macmillan. 1909. ISBN 9780722228111.
- A History of the Ancient World. Macmillan. 1911.
- A Source-Book of Ancient History. Macmillan. 1912. with Lillie Shaw Botsford
- Hellenic Civilization. Macmillan. 1915. as editor with Ernest Gottlieb Sihler
- A Brief History of the World. Macmillan. 1917. with Jay Barrett Botsford; 1922 revised edition
- Botsford, George Willis (1922). Hellenic History. (posthumous), 520 pages, ed. Jay Barrett Botsford (New York, 1922; rev. ed. by C. A. Robinson, Jr., 1939; 5th ed. by Donald Kagan, 1960).
