= Mallory–Weiss syndrome =

- Other names: Gastro-esophageal laceration syndrome, Mallory-Weiss tear Esophageal Tear
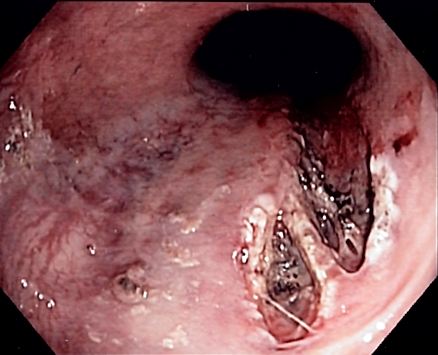
- Mallory–Weiss tear affecting the esophageal side of the gastroesophageal junction, 2019
- Specialty: Gastroenterology
- Complications: Death Shock
- Usual onset: All ages
- Causes: Forceful Vomiting
- Risk factors: Projectile vomiting Others
- Diagnostic method: Endoscopy
- Prevention: Preventing Vomiting and ORT (oral rehydration therapy) and medical treatments like endoclips

Mallory–Weiss syndrome is a condition where high intra-abdominal pressure causes laceration and bleeding of the mucosa called Mallory-Weiss tears. Additionally, Mallory–Weiss syndrome is one of the most common causes of acute upper gastrointestinal bleeding, counting of around 1-15% of all cases in adults and less than 5% in children. It has been found that tears are up to 2 to 4 times more prevalent in men than women. The tears can cause upper gastrointestinal bleeding and predominantly occur where the esophagus meets the stomach (gastroesophageal junction). However, the tears can happen anywhere from the middle of the esophagus to the cardia of the stomach. Mallory–Weiss syndrome is often caused by constant vomiting and retching from alcoholism or bulimia. Gastroesophageal reflux disease (GERD) is another risk factor that is often linked with Mallory–Weiss syndrome. However, not every individual with Mallory–Weiss syndrome, will have these risk factors. Individuals with Mallory–Weiss syndrome will have hematemesis (vomiting up blood), however the symptoms can vary.

== History ==
Before 1929, there were cases reported with similar symptoms of bleeding in the esophagus, the first being Johann Friedrich Hermann Albers reporting ulcer in the lower esophagus in 1833 via autopsy; however those were caused by ulcers and not lacerations. Another instance of Mallory–Weiss syndrome was from 1879 when Dr. Heinrich Quincke discovered 3 cases of bleeding from the formation of ulcers in the gastroesophageal tube; 2 of the cases were fatal due to vomiting of blood. This was followed by 2 cases reported by Dieulafoy to witness death from the phenomenon via vomiting of blood and 100 more cases in later literature before the findings in 1929.

Mallory–Weiss syndrome was named after G. Kenneth Mallory and Soma Weiss who accurately characterized the condition as a lower esophageal laceration in 1929 in 15 patients afflicted with alcoholism who presented with signs and symptoms of vomiting and retching. It was hypothesized that repeated vomiting would lead to the formation of tears if the body was not able to coordinate the cardiac opening of the stomach with the contraction of the abdominal muscles to induce the vomiting. Years later, Weiss and Mallory performed autopsies on 4 patients that died due to the complications of the syndrome caused by the hemorrhage. With the autopsies, it was noted that patients had lesions that were present on the esophagus down to the junction of the esophagus that meets the stomach. These particular lesions had signs of continual exposure to gastric juices from the stomach caused by the vomiting due to the pressure imbalances from the stomach; as a result the acutely formed lesions developed into chronic ulcerative lesions that ran deep into the layers of the esophagus up until the muscle fibers. In addition, there were signs of small arterioles that ruptured and small veins that were near the lesions which explains the hemorrhage that was present in these patients.

Dr. John Decker also examined patients afflicted with Mallory–Weiss syndrome via autopsy to note that many of patients did not have a history of alcoholism unlike the initial study conducted by the physicians the syndrome is named after; though Decker did comment that patients could be examined via gastroscope alongside Dr. Palmer who specifically mentioned the use of an endoscopy for diagnosis of Mallory–Weiss syndrome, so clinicians would not have to wait for a patient to die before performing an autopsy. However, a common finding between the patients with Decker's analysis is the exacerbation of the lesions caused by vomiting with atrophic gastritis being an underlying factor that to those formations; though atrophic gastritis is a condition that is common with the elderly population which most of the 11 patients undergoing an autopsy were above 60 years of age. Moving forward to 1955, advances in surgery allow for a patient afflicted with Mallory–Weiss syndrome to be identified, then treated with the surgical procedure with Dr. E. Gale Whiting & Dr. Gilbert Baronne, when the only way in the past was to perform an autopsy when a patient is deceased. The following year, Hardy per the recommendations of Palmer and Decker was able to complete the first diagnosis of the syndrome via endoscopy, leading to an increased incidence of Mallory–Weiss syndrome as shown with over 200 cases being mentioned in the literature as of 1973, and eventually the standard to make use of endoscopy to diagnosis the condition to witness lacerations along the esophageal lining and the signs of hemorrhage.

== Signs and symptoms ==
Mallory–Weiss syndrome often presents as an episode of vomiting up blood (hematemesis) after violent retching or vomiting, or due to undigested food residues but may also be noticed as old blood in the stool (melena), and a history of retching may be absent. Oftentimes, hematemesis is accompanied by chest, back, or epigastric pain. Additional symptoms can occur depending on how severe the condition is. Some individuals have experienced dizziness, loss of consciousness, and upper abdomen pain. There has been a recent development in the causes of Mallory-Weiss tear due to undigested food particles in elderly and not with vomiting or violent retching as per latest finding in a research paper by medical students and a doctor, Shashwat Arora, Dr.Waqas Alauddin, Ishita Singh, Prabhnoor Monga and Shreyash Yadav from India.

The condition is rarely fatal since in 90% of cases the tears heal on their own and the bleeding will stop spontaneously within 48 to 72 hours. However, endoscopic or surgical treatment may be necessary for severe bleeds. In cases of more severe bleeding, the typical symptoms of Mallory-Weiss Syndrome are those typical found in shock, which can be life-threatening. If a patient does happen to go into shock it may be reversed if discovered early. Although there are multiple types of shock, hemorrhagic hypovolemic shock is most commonly associated with gastrointestinal bleeding. Furthermore, gastrointestinal losses, such as those incurred from prolonged vomiting or diarrhea are associated with non-hemorrhagic hypovolemic shock. Both hemorrhagic and non-hemorrhagic hypovolemic shock can occur when there are decreases in intravascular volume, such as when the body is hemorrhaging (bleeding) or significant fluid loss. This decrease in intravascular volume causes subsequent reflex mechanism produced by the body to activate SANs (sympathetic nervous system) in the later stages of hypovolemic shock. SANs is activated in response to the drop in mean arterial pressure that is brought on by the loss of fluid.

== Causes ==
The causes of Mallory–Weiss syndrome is often associated with alcoholism, eating disorders such as bulimia nervosa, and gastroesophageal reflux disease (GERD). Specifically, up to 75% of patients have been observed with a heavy alcohol use associated with emesis.

It is also significantly noted in recent research by Arora S et al. that it is associated with undigested food residues.

It is also thought that Mallory–Weiss syndrome can be caused by actions that cause sudden increases in intra-abdominal pressure, such as repeated severe vomiting or coughing. There is some conflicting evidence that the presence of a hiatal hernia could be a predisposing condition to developing Mallory–Weiss syndrome. There is conflicting data suggesting the association between hiatal hernias and Mallory–Weiss syndrome. In 1989, a study conducted in Japan set out to determine if there was a link to Mallory–Weiss syndrome and hiatal hernias, this study found that hiatial hernias were found in 75% of patients with Mallory–Weiss syndrome. On the contrary, a case-control study in 2017 found there was no association between hiatal hernias and Mallory–Weiss syndrome. Forceful vomiting causes tearing of the mucosa at the junction. Additionally, the use of NSAIDs (non-steroidal anti-inflammatory drugs) such as ibuprofen, are known to increase the risk of upper gastrointestinal bleeding. NSAIDs can increase the risk of upper gastrointestinal bleeding because they can cause further damage to the intestinal submucosa by inhibiting prostaglandin synthesis. NSAID abuse is also a rare association. In rare instances some chronic disorders like Ménière's disease that cause long term nausea and vomiting could be a factor. Other potential risks for GI bleeds are usage of anticoagulants and older age.

Additionally, bleeding from Mallory-Weiss tears is often associated with individuals who have a history of portal hypertension and esophageal varices. Portal hypertension is where there is increased pressure within the venous portal system. Additionally, studies that were performed in patients with cirrhosis (scaring/fibrosis of the liver) who also had portal hypertension have shown that an increase in portal pressure can cause an increase in intra-abdominal pressure. These increases in intra-abdominal pressure are associated with Mallory-Weiss Syndrome. More severe upper gastrointestinal bleeds are associated with concurrent portal hypertension and esophageal varices. The formation of esophageal varices (dilated veins) is linked to the presence of portal hypertension. Additionally, esophageal varices can rupture which can be fatal.

The tear involves the mucosa and submucosa but not the muscular layer (contrast to Boerhaave syndrome which involves all the layers). Most patients are between the ages of 30 and 50 years, although it has been reported in infants aged as young as 3 weeks, as well as in older people. Hyperemesis gravidarum, which is severe morning sickness associated with vomiting and retching in pregnancy, is also a known cause of Mallory–Weiss tear.

There have been a few complications from invasive procedures such as trans-esophageal echocardiography and upper gastrointestinal endoscopy that cause Mallory-Weiss tears called iatrogenic Mallory–Weiss syndrome. However, it is infrequent since it only occurs in 0.07% to 0.49% of individuals who have received the upper gastrointestinal endoscopy procedure.

Furthermore, there were some cases reported of individuals developing Mallory-Weiss tears after cardiopulmonary resuscitation (CPR). The individuals did not have a history of alcoholism, hiatal hernia, or gastrointestinal diseases, but woke up vomiting blood. A GI endoscopy was performed and tears were found on the esophagogastric junction and lesser curvature of the stomach. An increase in intragastric pressure during CPR caused the Mallory-Weiss tears.

== Diagnosis ==
Definitive diagnosis of Mallory-Weiss tears is by upper GI endoscopy of the esophagus and stomach. Typically, the tear is located near the top of the stomach's lesser curvature and below the gastroesophageal junction. In the majority of patients, tears usually range from approximately 2 to 4 cm in length. The findings may include indications of non-bleeding, active bleeding, or the presence of clot over the tear. Furthermore, an upper GI endoscopy can reveal underlying conditions that lead to the signs of bleeding secondary to the tears, including varices and ulcers along the upper GI tract. To determine if the patient has active bleedings or signs of chronic alcoholism that can precede Mallory–Weiss syndrome, the patient's lab values would be obtained to get a complete blood count (CBC) including hematocrit & hemoglobin levels alongside platelet count. Additionally, diagnosis of Mallory-Weiss Syndrome includes elimination of other causes of an upper gastrointestinal bleed and/or bleeding in general. For example, a patient should undergo more labs to determine kidney function via measuring blood urea nitrogen and creatinine as a patient with chronic kidney disease can be mistaken to have active bleeding due to anemia induced by chronic kidney disease or if both the esophageal lacerations and chronic kidney disease are contributing to the low hematocrit & hemoglobin levels.

Proper history taking by the medical doctor to distinguish other conditions that cause haematemesis but definitive diagnosis is by conducting esophagogastroduodenoscopy, which is a procedure that allows the oropharynx, esophagus, stomach, and proximal duodenum (beginning of the small intestine) to be visualized.

== Treatment ==
The course of treatment and management of Mallory–Weiss syndrome depends on the amount of bleeding or hematemesis. Although blood transfusion is ultimately needed for many patients with Mallory–Weiss syndrome, 90% of Mallory-Weiss tears can heal on their own spontaneously. If the bleeding is mild and localized, the condition can be managed with conservative treatment methods such as intravenous antacids, antiemetics, fasting, and bedrest. Antiemetics are medications used to help with nausea and vomiting. However, if constant bleeding is observed upon endoscopy, endoscopic hemostasis techniques are necessary as the first-line treatment. Four examples of endoscopic hemostasis techniques are hemoclipping, heat probe thermocoagulation, injection therapy, and band ligation.

Hemoclipping is an effective method for treating Mallory-Weiss tears because it uses small metal clips, which cause minimal tissue damage and stop the bleeding by clipping the affected blood vessels. Although hemoclip placement is a convenient procedure for nonfibrotic tissue, such as Mallory–Weiss syndrome, placing a hemoclip can be challenging at the typical location of Mallory-Weiss tears at the gastroesophageal junction.

Heat probe thermocoagulation is one of the endoscopic therapies used to stop bleeding by simultaneously applying heat and pressure directly on the area of the active bleed to start the coagulation. Thermocoagulation with bipolar or multipolar electrocautery can be employed to cauterize tissue. It is most appropriate for small and localized lesions that require minimal cauterization. However, it should be avoided in patients with esophageal varices as the absence of a serosal layer in the esophagus increases susceptibility to perforation and could exacerbate bleeding, posing significant risks. It should also be avoided in individuals with portal hypertension because more bleeding can occur. It is also noted that repeated coagulation therapy can lead to risk of transmural injury. Treatment is usually supportive as persistent bleeding after endoscopic treatment or esophagogastroscopy is uncommon.

Injection of epinephrine or cauterization to stop the bleeding through vasoconstriction may be undertaken during the index endoscopy procedure in the case of active and recurrent bleeding. Because it is easy to implement and widely available, such injection methods to stop bleeding are commonly used. However, this method requires close monitoring due to the possibility of causing ventricular tachycardia when administered submucosally. Thus, epinephrine injections should not be used in patients who have existing cardiovascular conditions.

Band ligation stops the bleeding by applying a direct pressure from a transparent ligation cap. The role of transparent cap is to stabilize the bleeding site and reduce the effects of peristalsis. Band ligation technique is relatively simple compared to other hemostatic techniques. Band ligation is recommended for individuals with esophageal varices or portal hypertension.

Some other options to stop bleeding include ethanol injections, ε-aminocaproic acid, or Argon plasma coagulation (APC). When endoscopy is ineffective, angiography or embolization of the arteries supplying the region may be required to stop the bleeding. If all other methods fail, high gastrostomy can be used to ligate the bleeding vessel. A Sengstaken-Blakemore tube will not be able to stop bleeding as here the bleeding is arterial and the pressure in the balloon is not sufficient to overcome the arterial pressure. After patient receives appropriate intervention, bleeding must be observed for at least 48 hours as a follow-up.

If a patient is thought to have shock, intravenous (IV) fluid resuscitation should begin immediately. In the case of hypovolemic shock, patients are typically placed in the Trendelenburg position where the feet are above the head. Additionally, if there is found to be an active bleed treatment with PRBCs (packed red blood cells) is typical.

In pharmacological treatment, proton pump inhibitors (such as omeprazole, pantoprazole) and H2 receptor antagonist (such as famotidine) are utilized to manage and lower gastric acidity. Decreasing the acidity through use of proton pump inhibitors and H2 receptor antagonists allows there to be time for healing. Proton pump inhibitors are preferred over H2 receptor antagonists because they are more potent and can keep gastric pH under control for a longer period of time. Furthermore, proton pump inhibitors have a decreased recurrent bleeding rate and do not lose their efficacy as a side effect when taken regularly over time (tachyphylaxis) compared to H2 receptor antagonists. It is recommended that individuals are given proton pump inhibitors within 72 hours of an endoscopy to prevent further GI bleeds. Additionally, antiemetics such as promethazine are given to control nausea and vomiting as part of the treatment regimen.

== See also ==
- Boerhaave syndrome – Full thickness esophageal ruptures are also often secondary to vomiting/retching. It is important to differentiate Boerhaave syndrome from Mallory-Weiss Syndrome as both condition involve damage to the esophagus, but Boerhaave syndrome specifically involves a transmural esophageal perforation.
- Gastroesophageal reflux disease (GERD) - Chronic gastrointestinal disorder that affects the lower esophageal sphincter and transient lower esophageal sphincter relaxations.
- Hematemesis - Vomiting up blood
- Hyperemesis gravidarum
- Ménière's disease
- Medications
  - Proton pump inhibitors
  - H2 receptor antagonists
  - Non-steroidal anti-inflammatory drugs
  - Antiemetics
