= George Kenneth Mallory =

American physician

- Born: February 14, 1900; Boston, Massachusetts, U.S.
- Died: April 8, 1986 (aged 86)
- Education: Harvard Medical School
- Occupation: Physician
- Known for: describing the Mallory-Weiss syndrome

George Kenneth Mallory (February 14, 1900 – April 8, 1986) was an American pathologist chiefly remembered for describing the Mallory–Weiss tear with Soma Weiss.

He was born in Boston, Massachusetts on 14 February 1900, the son of Persis McClain Tracy of Chautauqua, New York and Frank Burr Mallory. He received his medical degree from Harvard Medical School in 1926, and subsequently worked at the Mallory Institute of Pathology (founded by, and named after, his father) at Boston City Hospital throughout his career, becoming director in 1951. He lectured at both Harvard Medical School and Boston Medical School. He was appointed a professor at Boston Medical School in 1948, and he became an emeritus professor in 1966. His primary interest was diseases of the liver and kidneys.

In 1929, Mallory and Soma Weiss, a physician at Harvard, reported on 15 cases of severe, painless hemorrhage caused by a tear in the mucosa of the esophagus or gastroesophageal junction preceded by vomiting in alcoholic patients. They reported a further six cases in 1932. This syndrome has become known as Mallory–Weiss syndrome.
