= Friedrich Goltz =

German physiologist (1834–1902)

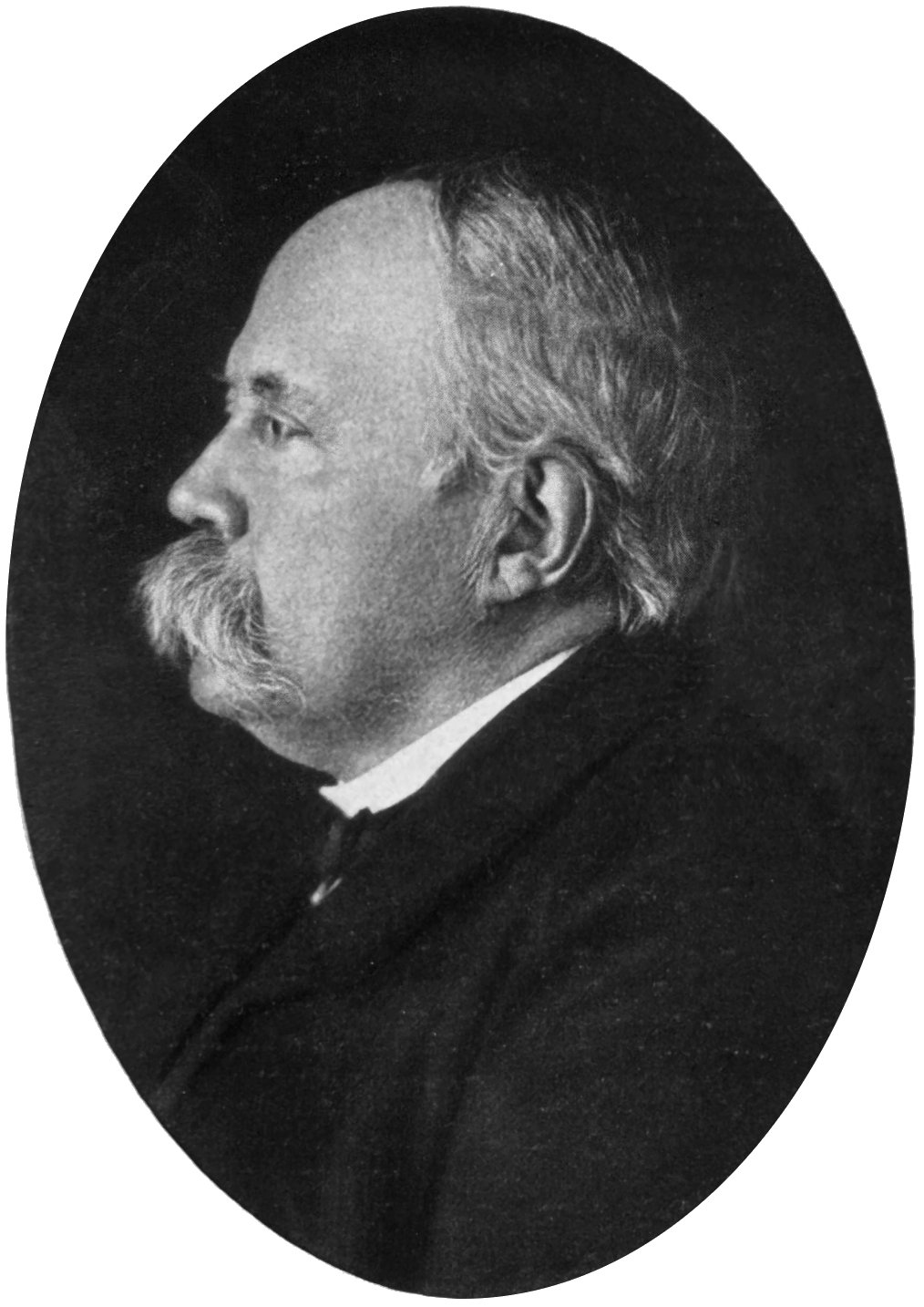
Friedrich Goltz (1834-1902)

Friedrich Leopold Goltz (14 August 1834 – 5 May 1902) was a German physiologist and nephew of the writer Bogumil Goltz.

== Biography ==
Born in Posen (Poznań), Grand Duchy of Posen, he studied medicine at the University of Königsberg, and following two years of surgical training, served as a prosector of anatomy in Königsberg. In 1870 he succeeded A.W. Volkmann as professor of physiology at the University of Halle, followed by a professorship at the University of Straßburg (from 1872). He is known for his experiments in neurophysiology, and is credited as being the first scientist to perform a hemispherectomy on a dog.

In 1870 he introduced the "hydrostatic concept" involving the semicircular canals of the inner ear and their ability to transmit sensations of position, and therefore providing assistance in equilibrioception. Goltz proposed that the canals dealt mainly with the equilibrium of the head, and that the movements of the body were regulated by the more or less conscious awareness an individual has of the position of his head in space.

Goltz held a unitary view of brain function, which he demonstrated in London at the International Medical Congress of 1881. Here he showed that a dog with sections of its cerebral cortex removed, could still remain functional. Conversely, Scottish neurologist David Ferrier held the belief of localization of cerebral functions, which he demonstrated at the same conference. Ferrier presented macaque monkeys with particular paralysis following specific surgeries of the motor cortex. Ferrier's demonstration of localized functionality impressed the medical community, and was seen as a major impetus in the development of neurological surgery.

He died in Straßburg (Strasbourg).

== Published works ==
He published several articles on the function of the heart and on the venous tone in Virchows Archiv of Pathological Anatomy as well as in Pflügers Archiv of Physiology. Among his principal writings are the following:

- Beiträge zur Lehre von den Funktionen des Nervensystems des Frosches, Berlin: August Hirschwald, 1869 - Contributions to knowledge on functions of the nervous system in frogs.
- Über die Verrichtungen des Grosshirns. Gesammelte Abhandlungen, Bonn 1881 - On actions of the cerebrum.
- Wider die Humanaster. Rechtfertigung eines Vivisektors. Strasbourg, 1883 - Justification for vivisection.
