= Southern Society for Clinical Investigation =

US medical organization

The Southern Society for Clinical Investigation is a professional society for medicine, based in the southern United States.

The organization was founded as the Southern Society for Clinical Research on October 5, 1946, at a meeting in New Orleans attended by representatives from nineteen medical schools in the southern U.S. Its first president was Tinsley Randolph Harrison, and it began holding annual scientific meetings from 1947. The organization was renamed in 1966 to its present name, in order to avoid confusion with the Southern Section of the American Federation for Clinical Research. In 1984, it became the sponsor of the American Journal of the Medical Sciences.

== Awards ==
The Founders' Medal Award has been awarded annually since 1973 to notable members of the SSCI.
