= Samuel Sachs =

American investment banker

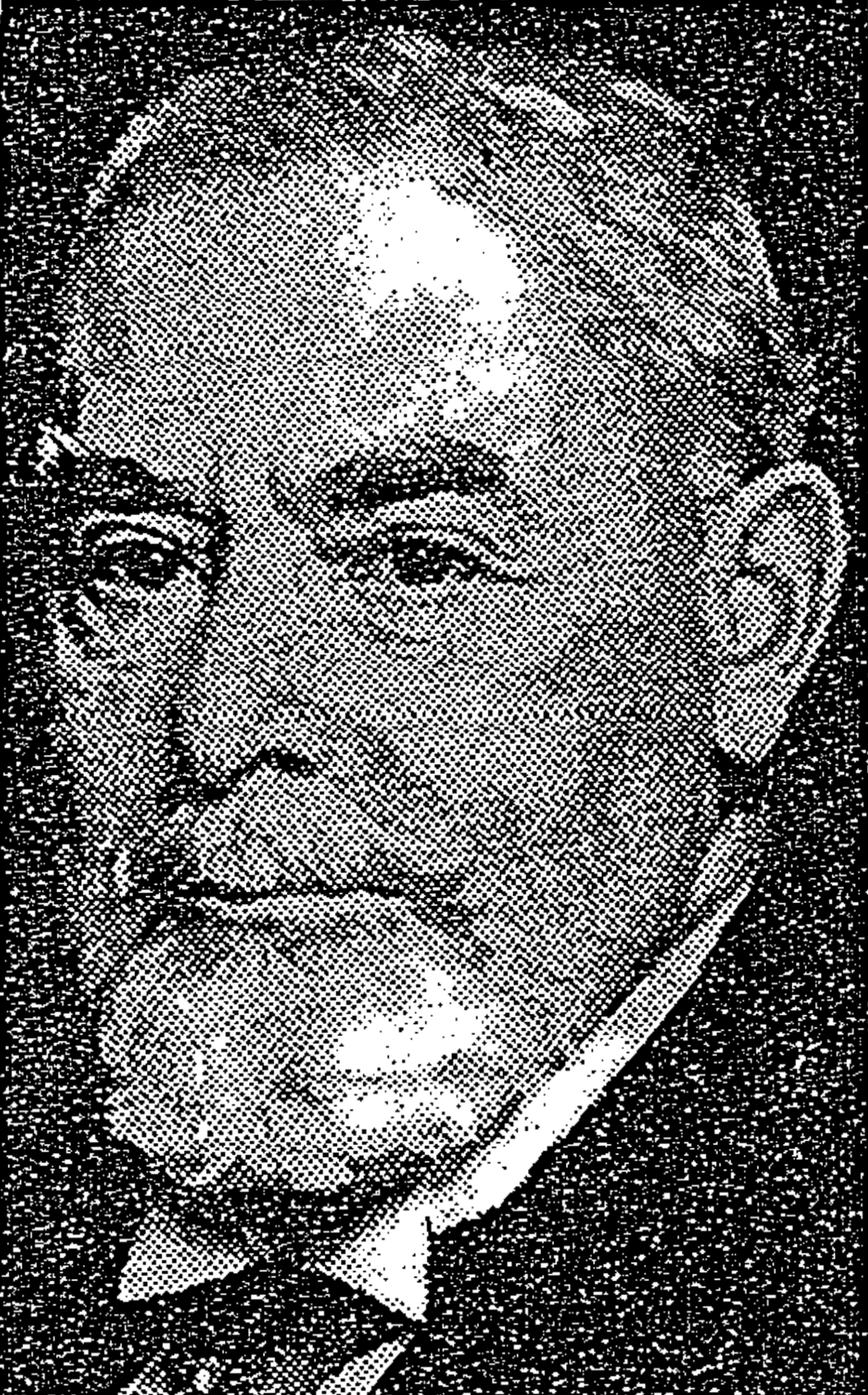
- Photo from a 1935 obituary
- Born: July 28, 1851; Maryland, U.S.
- Died: March 2, 1935 (aged 83); New York City, U.S.
- Occupation: Investment banker
- Known for: Name partner of Goldman Sachs
- Spouse: Louisa Goldman (m. 1882)
- Children: Paul J. Sachs (1878–1965); Arthur Sachs (1880-1975); Walter E. Sachs (1884–1980); Ella Sachs Plotz (1886-1922)
- Parent(s): Sophie and Joseph Sachs
- Family: Julius Sachs (brother); Bernard Sachs (brother); Marcus Goldman (father-in-law)

Samuel Sachs (/zɑːks/ ZOX; July 28, 1851 – March 2, 1935) was an American investment banker. He is most known for co-founding Goldman Sachs along with Marcus Goldman. He is noted for changing the nature of merchant banking by underwriting of the stock issuance to raise funds for new corporate entities (i.e., initial public offering).

== Early life ==
Samuel Sachs was born on July 28, 1851, in Maryland, the son of Sophie (née Baer) and Joseph Sachs, both Jewish immigrants from Bavaria, Germany. The family fled Germany to avoid the crises in the country that led to the revolutions of 1848. Sachs had one older sibling, Julius Sachs, and three younger siblings, Emily Sachs, Henry Sachs, and Bernard Sachs.

== Career ==
Sachs, along with his longtime friend Philip Lehman of Lehman Brothers, pioneered the issuing of company shares as a way for new companies to raise funds. This allowed investors to capyilatize on their innovations. This became Goldman Sach's core business.

Sachs then joined his father-in-law Marcus Goldman's firm which prompted the name change to Goldman Sachs in 1904. Together they underwrote securities offerings for such large firms as Sears, Roebuck and Company. During this time, Goldman Sachs also diversified to become involved in other major securities markets, like the over-the-counter, bond, and convertibles markets which are still a big part of the company's revenue today. Sachs retired in 1928.

== Philanthropy ==
Sachs donated US$50,000 (equivalent to $939,000 in 2025) to Harvard University in 1924.

== Personal life and death ==
Sachs married Louisa Goldman, the youngest daughter of Marcus Goldman, also German Jewish immigrant. They resided at The Pierre. They had four children: Paul Joseph Sachs, Arthur Sachs, Walter Edward Sachs, and Ella Sachs Plotz.

Sachs died on March 2, 1935, in New York City.

== See also ==
- Goldman–Sachs family

Business positions
| Preceded by Marcus Goldman | Chairman and CEO, Goldman Sachs; 1894–1928 | Succeeded by Sidney Weinberg |
