= Julius Sachs =

American educator

- Born: July 6, 1849; Baltimore, Maryland
- Died: February 2, 1934 (aged 84); New York City
- Education: Columbia University (BA); University of Rostock (PhD)
- Spouse: Rosa Goldman (m. 1874)
- Children: Ernest Sachs (1879–1958)
- Family: Marcus Goldman (father-in-law); Bernard Sachs (brother); Samuel Sachs (brother)

Julius Sachs (July 6, 1849 – February 2, 1934) was an American educator. He founded the Sachs Collegiate Institute. Sachs was a member of the Goldman–Sachs family of bankers.

Julius Sachs was born on July 6, 1849, in Baltimore. After taking his A.B. at Columbia in 1867 and his A.M. in 1871, he studied at several European universities. He was awarded a Ph.D. in 1871 by the University of Rostock. He married Rosa Goldman, daughter of investment banker Marcus Goldman, in 1874.

He founded Sachs School for Boys in 1872, and served as the school's principal for 32 years. He also founded the Sachs School for Girls, which he directed for 18 years. He was elected president of the American Philological Association for 1890-91, the first Jew to serve in that post. He was appointed Professor of Education at Teachers College, Columbia University in 1902. A few years later the two Sachs schools were discontinued, according to Sachs' obituary. However, the schools continued under different names and with different ownership; the Dwight School is a direct successor to the original schools.

At Sachs Collegiate Institute and Columbia University, Sachs tutored many students who later became distinguished figures in American life, such as Herbert H. Lehman, Irving Lehman, Walter Lippmann, and Hans Zinsser.

He retired from teaching in 1917 with the title of professor emeritus.

Inspired by Julius' brother Bernard Sachs, Julius' son Ernest Sachs became a notable physician.
