= Marcus Goldman =

German-American banker

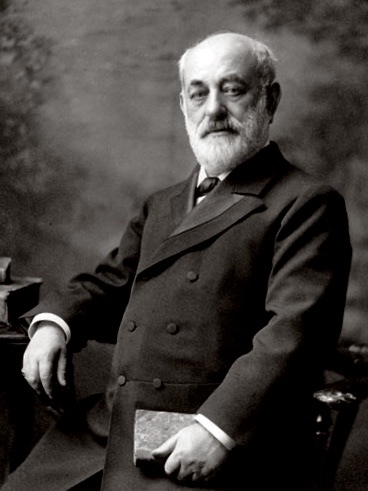
- Born: Mark Goldmann; December 9, 1821; Trappstadt, Kingdom of Bavaria, German Confederation
- Died: July 20, 1904 (aged 82); Elberon, New Jersey, United States
- Occupations: Investment banker, businessman, financier
- Spouse(s): Bertha (née Goldman; m. 185?)
- Children: Julius Goldman; Rebecca Dreyfuss (married to Ludwig Dreyfuss); Rosa Sachs (married to Julius Sachs); Louisa Sachs (married to Samuel Sachs); Henry Goldman (1857–1937)

Marcus Goldman (born Mark Goldmann; December 9, 1821 – July 20, 1904) was a German-American investment banker, businessman, and financier. He was one of the founders of Goldman Sachs, which has since become one of the world's largest investment banks.

== Early life ==
Marcus Goldman was born on December 9, 1821, in Trappstadt, Kingdom of Bavaria, to an Ashkenazi Jewish family. His father, Wolf Goldmann, was a farmer and cattle dealer. His mother, Bella Katz Oberbrunner, who came from Zeil am Main, was widowed with five children from a former marriage; her first husband was called Samuel Oberbrunner. His paternal grandfather was called Jonathan Marx until he changed his name to Goldmann when Jews were allowed to have surnames in 1811. While attending classes at the synagogue in Würzburg, he met Joseph Sachs, who would become his lifelong friend. In Bavaria, Goldman worked as a schoolteacher.

Goldman immigrated to the United States from Frankfurt am Main, Germany, in 1848 during the first great wave of Jewish immigration to America, resulting from the Revolutions of 1848 in the German states. Upon his arrival in America, his name was changed to Marcus Goldman by US immigration. He married Bertha Goldman (no relation to Goldman's family), who was 18 and also a Jewish immigrant. An account stated that Goldman was unable to afford a bouquet of flowers when he was courting his wife so he gave her a bunch of radishes.

== Career ==
Goldman worked as a peddler with a horse-drawn cart and later as a shopkeeper in Philadelphia, where he initially rented the room in a boarding-house previously rented by his old friend Joseph Sachs. He later became a shopkeeper, after setting up a clothing store on Market Street. In 1869, Goldman relocated to New York City in search of a more profitable work. He set up a shingle on Pine Street in lower Manhattan, with the legend "Marcus Goldman & Co.", identifying himself as a broker of IOUs.

From his earliest days of his business, Goldman was able to single-handedly transact as much as $5 million worth of commercial paper a year. Successful though he was, Goldman's business was insignificant compared to that of the other Jewish-German bankers of the day. Concerns like J. & W. Seligman & Co., with working capital of $6 million in 1869 (equivalent of $145 million in 2025), were already modern-day investment bankers immersed in underwriting and trading railroad bonds. The marriage of Goldman's daughter Louisa to Samuel Sachs brought the two families together even more as his elder daughter was already married to the latter's brother.

In 1882, Goldman invited his son-in-law Samuel Sachs to join him in the business and changed the firm's name to M. Goldman and Sachs. Business boomed—soon the new firm was turning over $30 million worth of paper a year—and the firm's capital was now $100,000 (equivalent of $3.3 million in 2025).

For almost fifty years after its inception, all of Goldman Sachs's partners were members of intermarried families. In 1885, Goldman took his own son Henry and his son-in-law Ludwig Dreyfuss into the business as junior partners and the firm adopted its present name, Goldman Sachs & Co. In 1894, Henry Sachs entered the firm, and in 1896, the firm joined the New York Stock Exchange.

When Goldman retired, he left the firm in the hands of his son Henry Goldman and his son-in-law Samuel Sachs. In 1904, two of Sachs' sons, Arthur and Paul, joined the firm immediately after graduating from Harvard University.

== Personal life and death ==
Goldman married eighteen-year-old Bertha Goldman, who had also immigrated from Germany. They had five children. Goldman's youngest daughter, Louisa, married Samuel Sachs, the son of close friends and fellow Lower Franconia, Bavaria immigrants. Louisa's older sister and Sam's older brother had already married. His older son, Julius Goldman, married Sarah Adler, daughter of Samuel Adler.

Goldman died in Elberon, New Jersey, in the summer of 1904.

== See also ==
- Goldman–Sachs family

Business positions
Preceded by Founder	Chairman and CEO, Goldman Sachs; 1869–1894	Succeeded by Samuel Sachs
