= Goldman Sachs =

American investment bank

The Goldman Sachs Group, Inc.

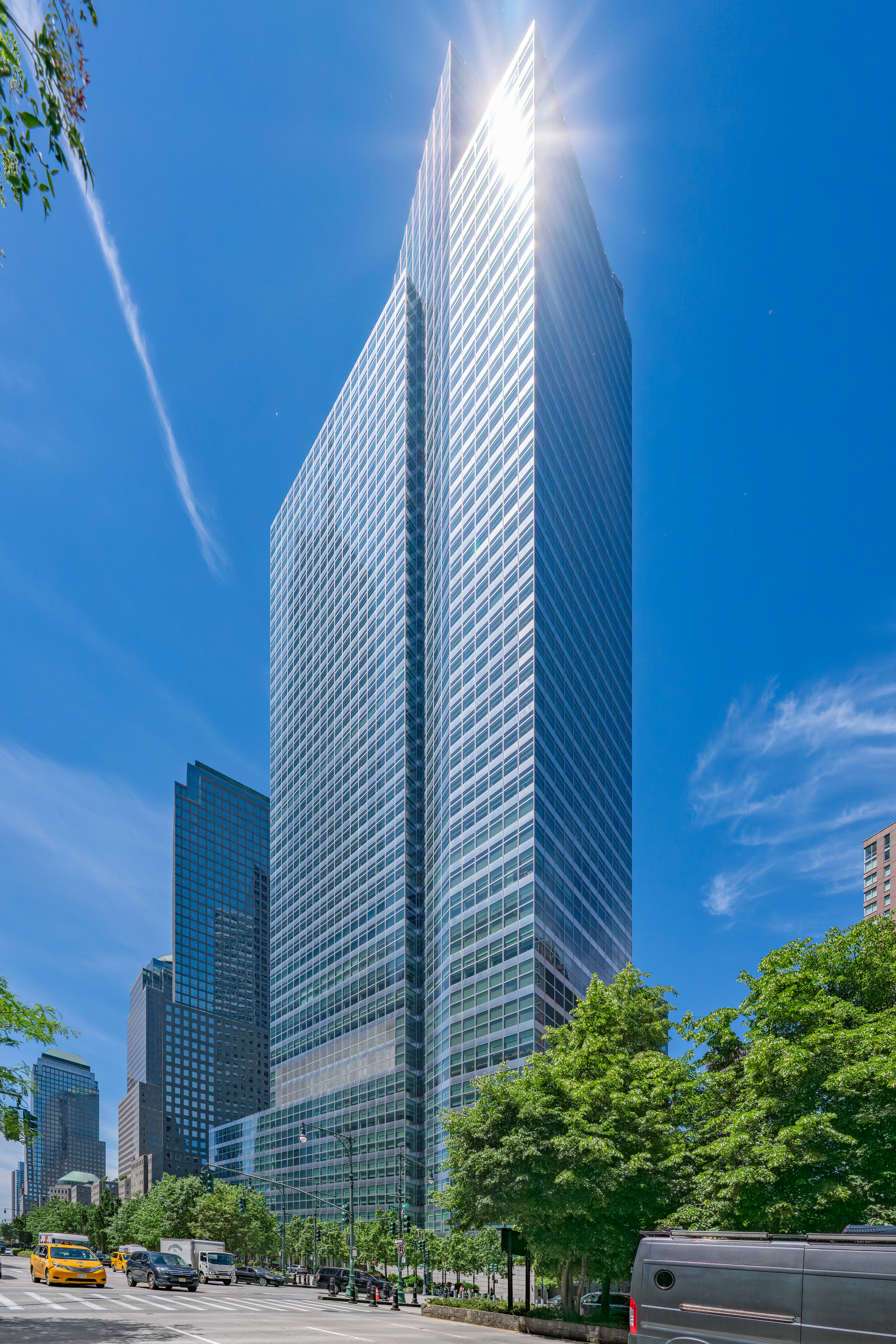
- Headquarters at 200 West Street in Manhattan
- Type: Public
- Traded as: NYSE: GS; DJIA component; S&P 100 component; S&P 500 component
- ISIN: US38141G1040
- Industry: Financial services
- Founded: 1869; 157 years ago
- Founders: Marcus Goldman
- Headquarters: 200 West Street, New York City, U.S.
- Area served: Worldwide
- Key people: David M. Solomon (chairman and CEO); Lloyd Blankfein (senior chairman)
- Products: Investment banking; Global markets; Investment management; Wealth management; Direct bank
- Revenue: ▲US$58.28 billion (2025)
- Operating income: ▲US$21.85 billion (2025)
- Net income: ▲US$16.30 billion (2025)
- AUM: ▲US$3.61 trillion (2025)
- Total assets: ▲US$1.81 trillion (2025)
- Total equity: ▲US$124.97 billion (2025)
- Number of employees: 47,400 (2025)
- Divisions: Global Banking & Markets; Asset & Wealth Management
- Capital ratio: Tier 1 capital 14.8% (2025)
- Rating: Standard & Poor's: BBB+; Moody's: A2; Fitch Ratings: A
- Website: www.goldmansachs.com

Major Goldman Sachs offices

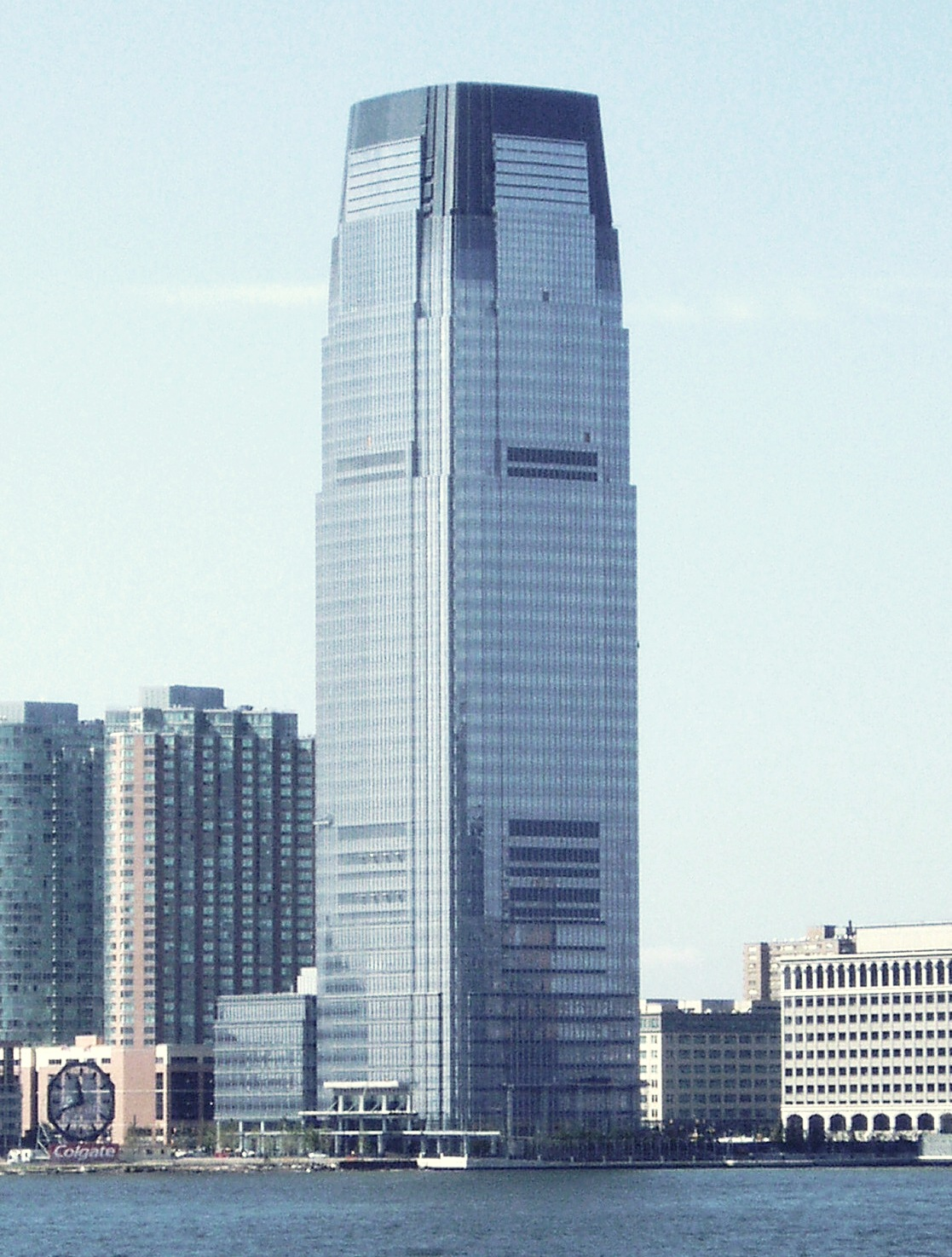
30 Hudson Street in Jersey City, New Jersey, U.S.

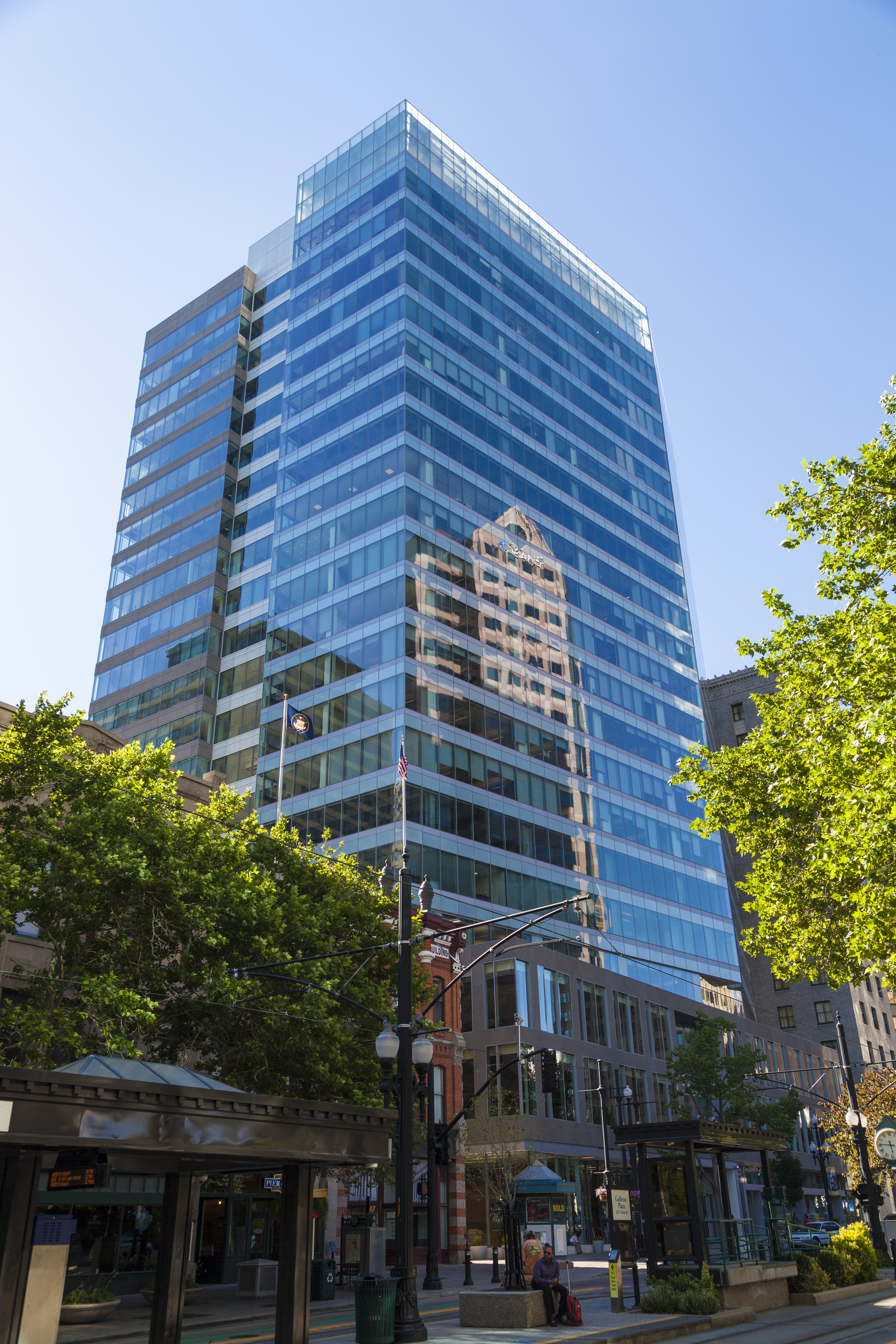
222 Main, Salt Lake City, Utah, U.S.

The Goldman Sachs Group, Inc. (/sæks/ SAKS) is an American multinational investment bank and financial services company. It was founded in 1869 and is headquartered in the Battery Park City neighborhood of Manhattan in New York City, with offices in many financial centers worldwide. Goldman Sachs is one of the largest investment banks by revenue. It is ranked 32nd on the Fortune 500 and 19th on the Forbes Global 2000. It is considered a systemically important financial institution (SIFI).

The company receives revenues from market making for many types of financial products (31% of 2025 revenues); net interest income (23% of 2025 revenues); investment management and wealth management (20% of 2025 revenues); investment banking (advisory for mergers and acquisitions and restructuring and securities underwriting, including initial public offerings) (16% of 2025 revenues); commissions and fees for clearing financial transactions (7% of 2025 revenues); and proprietary trading (3% of 2025 revenues).

== History ==
=== Founding and establishment ===
Second Goldman Sachs logo (1999–2020)

Third Goldman Sachs logo (2020–2024)

In 1869, Goldman Sachs was founded by Marcus Goldman in New York City in a one-room basement office next to a coal chute. In 1882, Goldman's son-in-law Samuel Sachs joined the firm. In 1885, Goldman's son, Henry Goldman, and his son-in-law, Ludwig Dreyfuss, joined the firm, which then adopted the name Goldman Sachs & Co. The company pioneered the use of commercial paper for entrepreneurs and joined the New York Stock Exchange (NYSE) in 1896. In 1898, the firm's capital stood at $1.6 million. It opened offices in Boston and Chicago in 1900, San Francisco in 1918, and Philadelphia and St. Louis in 1920.

Goldman Sachs entered the initial public offering (IPO) market in 1906 when it underwrote the IPO of Sears. The deal was facilitated by Henry Goldman's personal friendship with Julius Rosenwald, an owner of Sears. Goldman Sachs underwrote the IPOs of General Cigar Company also in 1906, F. W. Woolworth Company in 1912, and Continental Can. The firm was an innovator at establishing the price–earnings ratio, instead of book value, as a method for valuing companies, and was therefore able to raise funds for retailers and companies with few hard assets.

In 1912, Henry S. Bowers became the first non-member of the founding family to become a partner of the firm and share in its profits. In 1917, under growing pressure from the other partners in the firm due to his pro-German stance, Henry Goldman resigned. The Sachs family gained full control of the firm until Waddill Catchings joined the company in 1918. By 1928, Catchings was the Goldman Sachs partner with the single largest stake in the firm. In 1919, the company acquired a major interest in Merck & Co. and in 1922, it acquired a major interest in General Foods. In December 1928, the firm launched the Goldman Sachs Trading Corp., a closed-end fund. The fund failed during the Wall Street Crash of 1929, amid accusations that Goldman Sachs had engaged in share price manipulation and insider trading.

=== 1930–1979 ===
In 1930, during the Great Depression, the firm ousted Catchings, and Sidney Weinberg assumed the role of senior partner. Weinberg shifted the firm's focus away from trading and toward investment banking. His actions helped to restore some of the firm's tarnished reputation. Under Weinberg's leadership, Goldman Sachs was the lead advisor on the $657 million IPO of Ford Motor Company in 1956, a major victory at the time, as well as the $350 million debenture offering by Sears Roebuck in 1958. Under Weinberg's leadership, the firm started an investment research division and a municipal bond department, and it became an early innovator in risk arbitrage.

In the 1950s, Gus Levy joined the firm as a securities trader, where two powers fought for supremacy, one from investment banking and one from securities trading. Levy was a pioneer in block trading and the firm established this trend under his guidance. Due to Weinberg's heavy influence, the firm formed an investment banking division in 1956 in an attempt to shift focus off Weinberg. In 1957, the firm's headquarters were relocated to 20 Broad Street, New York City.

In 1969, Levy took over Weinberg's role as senior partner and built the firm’s trading franchise once again. Levy is credited with the firm’s famous philosophy of being "long-term greedy," which implied that as long as money is made over the long term, short-term losses are bearable. At the same time, partners reinvested nearly all of their earnings in the firm. Weinberg remained a senior partner of the firm and died in July of that year.

Another financial crisis for the firm occurred in 1970, when the Penn Central Transportation Company went bankrupt with $87 million in commercial paper outstanding, most of it issued through Goldman Sachs. In 1969, Goldman Sachs allegedly continued to sell the debt to investors despite knowing that Penn Central's financials were deteriorating. In 1970, Goldman Sachs tried to force Penn Central to buy back debt unsold by Goldman Sachs, without extending the same offer to its customers. These actions of alleged impropriety led to an investigation by the United States Securities and Exchange Commission, which was settled. Customers that bought Penn Central debt sued Goldman Sachs; the potential liability could have bankrupted the firm. However, the firm settled the lawsuits, received insurance proceeds, and the value of the debt did recover. The bankruptcy of Penn Central resulted in credit ratings for every issuer of commercial paper today by several credit rating agencies.

Under the direction of partner Stanley R. Miller, the firm opened its first international office in London in 1970 and created a private wealth management division along with a fixed income division in 1972. It pioneered the "white knight" strategy in 1974 during its attempts to defend Electric Storage Battery against a hostile takeover bid from International Nickel and Morgan Stanley. John Weinberg, the son of Sidney Weinberg, and John C. Whitehead assumed the roles of co-senior partners in 1976, once again emphasizing the co-leadership at the firm. One of their initiatives was the establishment of 14 business principles.

=== 1980–1999 ===
In 1981, Goldman acquired Spears, Benzak Salomon & Farrell, an asset manager. It was sold to KeyCorp in 1995.

In November 1981, the firm acquired J. Aron & Company, a commodities trading firm involved in the coffee and gold markets. It was merged into the Fixed Income division, which was renamed as Fixed Income, Currencies, and Commodities. Lloyd Blankfein joined Goldman Sachs as a result of the merger.

In 1983, the firm moved into a newly constructed global headquarters at 85 Broad Street. It occupied that building until it moved to its current headquarters in 2009. In 1985, it underwrote the public offering of the real estate investment trust (REIT) that owned Rockefeller Center, then the largest REIT offering in history. During the dissolution of the Soviet Union, the firm was involved advising companies that were undergoing privatization.

In 1986, the firm formed Goldman Sachs Asset Management, which provides investment and advisory services, including private equity and alternative investments, across public and private markets for institutions, financial advisors, and individuals. Also in 1986, the firm underwrote the IPO of Microsoft, advised General Electric on its acquisition of RCA Corporation, and joined the London and Tokyo stock exchanges. During the 1980s, the firm became the first investment bank to distribute its investment research electronically and created the first public offering of original issue deep-discount bond. In 1988, Goldman Sachs helped the State Bank of India obtain a credit rating and issue US$200 million in the US commercial paper market.

Robert Rubin and Stephen Friedman became co-senior partners in 1990 and pledged to focus on globalization of the firm to strengthen the mergers and acquisitions and trading business lines. In 1990, the firm introduced paperless trading to the NYSE. Rubin left the firm in 1992 to work in the presidency of Bill Clinton. In 1994, the company launched the Goldman Sachs Commodity Index (GSCI) and opened its first office in China in Beijing. That same year, Jon Corzine became CEO, following the retirement of Friedman as senior partner.

After decades of debate among the partners, Goldman Sachs became a public company via an IPO in May 1999. Goldman Sachs sold 12.6% of the firm to the public, and after the IPO, 48.3% of the firm was held by 221 former partners, 21.2% of the firm was held by non-partner employees, and the remaining 17.9% was held by retired Goldman Sachs partners and two long-time investors, Sumitomo Bank and the investing arm of Kamehameha Schools. The shares were priced at $53 each at listing. After the IPO, Henry Paulson became chairman and chief executive officer, succeeding Jon Corzine.

In July 1999, the company acquired Hull Group, an electronic trading company, for $531 million.

=== 2000–present ===
In September 2000, Goldman Sachs acquired Spear, Leeds, & Kellogg, one of the largest specialist firms on the New York Stock Exchange, for $6.3 billion.

In July 2003, Goldman Sachs acquired Ayco Company, a provider of financial plans and wealth management services for top-ranking company executives.

In May 2006, Henry Paulson left the firm to serve as United States Secretary of the Treasury, and Lloyd Blankfein was promoted to chairman and chief executive officer.

Before the subprime mortgage crisis, Goldman took out insurance on mortgage defaults from American International Group (AIG). Goldman Sachs was estimated to have $13 to $20 billion in counterparty exposure to AIG. As the value of the mortgages fell, Goldman Sachs issued billions of dollars in margin calls to AIG; however, the values of the underlying assets were subjective since they were not publicly traded. Goldman Sachs was accused of "being overly aggressive" with the margin calls and hastening the 2008 financial crisis.

In September 2008, facing a liquidity crisis as short-term credit markets froze due to the bankruptcy of Lehman Brothers, Goldman Sachs and Morgan Stanley, the last two major investment banks in the United States, both converted to bank holding companies to obtain access to the Federal Reserve's discount window for emergency loans. Also in September 2008, Berkshire Hathaway agreed to purchase $5 billion in Goldman Sachs preferred stock, and also received warrants to buy another $5 billion in Goldman Sachs common stock within five years. The company also raised $5 billion via a public offering of shares at $123 per share. Goldman Sachs also received a $10 billion preferred stock investment from the United States Department of the Treasury in October 2008, as part of the Troubled Asset Relief Program (TARP). In June 2009, Goldman Sachs repaid the U.S. Treasury's TARP investment, with 23% interest (in the form of $318 million in dividend payments and $1.418 billion in warrant redemptions). In March 2011, Goldman Sachs repurchased Berkshire Hathaway's preferred stock in Goldman Sachs.

In November 2009, Goldman Sachs opened its new headquarters at 200 West Street.

In September 2011, Goldman Sachs shut down its Global Alpha Fund LP hedge fund. The fund, which was founded by Cliff Asness and Mark Carhart, used quantitative analysis and high-frequency trading to make investments. Assets under management peaked at $12 billion in 2007 but had been declining ever since.

In the first quarter of 2014, Goldman Sachs acquired Deutsche Asset & Wealth Management's stable value business.

In August 2015, Goldman Sachs agreed to acquire General Electric's GE Capital Bank online deposit platform, including $8 billion of online deposits and another $8 billion of brokered certificates of deposit.

Logo of Marcus by Goldman Sachs

In April 2016, Goldman Sachs launched GS Bank, a direct bank. In October 2016, Goldman Sachs Bank USA started offering no-fee unsecured personal loans under the brand Marcus by Goldman Sachs.

In April 2018, Marcus by Goldman Sachs acquired Clarity Money, a personal finance management mobile app, for $100 million.

In July 2018, Goldman Sachs announced that David M. Solomon would succeed Lloyd Blankfein as chairman and chief executive officer.

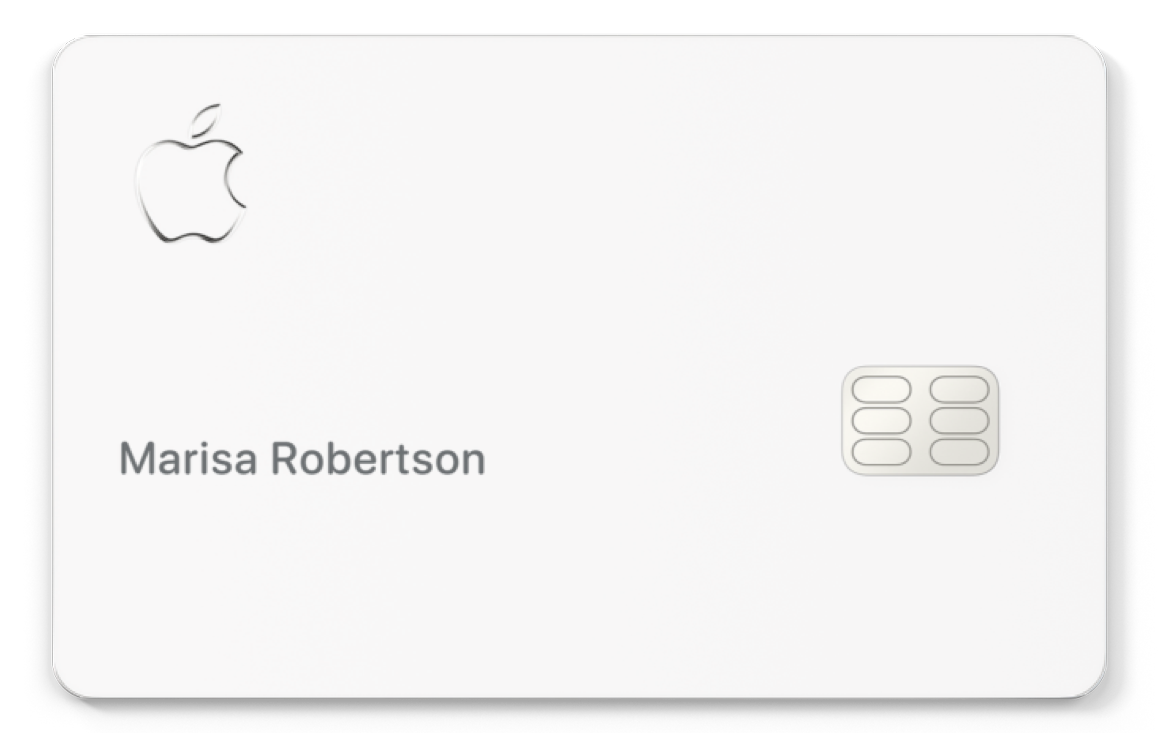
Example of physical Apple Card, issued by Goldman Sachs Bank USA

In March 2019, Apple announced that it would partner with Goldman Sachs to launch the Apple Card, the bank's first credit card offering.

In May 2019, Goldman Sachs acquired United Capital, a boutique wealth manager that had 22,000 clients and $25 billion in assets under management, for $750 million. In January 2020, the division was rebranded as Goldman Sachs Personal Financial Management. It was sold to Creative Planning in November 2023.

In August 2021, Goldman Sachs announced that it had agreed to acquire NN Investment Partners, which had $335 billion in assets under management, for €1.7 billion from NN Group.

In September 2021, the company agreed to acquired GreenSky, a buy now, pay later service for home improvement loans, for $2.24 billion.

In August 2022, Goldman Sachs acquired NextCapital, a provider of robo-advisor services for retirement accounts.

In January 2026, Goldman Sachs began transitioning the Apple Card program to JPMorgan Chase.

Also in January 2026, Goldman Sachs acquired Industry Ventures, a venture capital platform, for $665 million upfront plus up to $300 million in performance incentives.

In April 2026, Goldman Sachs acquired Innovator Capital, which managed 171 exchange-traded funds with about $31 billion in assets, for $2 billion.

In August 2026, Goldman Sachs acquired NEOS, a provider of exchange-traded funds that use options strategies, for as much as $2.25 billion.

== List of senior partners and CEOs ==
1. Marcus Goldman (1869–1893)
2. Samuel Sachs and Henry Goldman (1893–1914)
3. Henry Goldman (1914–1917)
4. Harry Sachs (1917–1921)
5. Waddill Catchings (1921–1930)
6. Sidney Weinberg (1930–1969)
7. Gus Levy (1969–1976)
8. John L. Weinberg and John C. Whitehead (1976–1984)
9. John L. Weinberg (1984–1990)
10. Robert Rubin and Stephen Friedman (1990–1992)
11. Stephen Friedman (1992–1994)
12. Jon Corzine (1994–1998)
13. Jon Corzine and Henry Paulson (1998–1999)
14. Henry Paulson (1999–2006)
15. Lloyd Blankfein (2006–2018)
16. David M. Solomon (2018–present)

== Financials ==
Year	2000	2001	2002	2003	2004	2005	2006	2007	2008	2009	2010	2011	2012	2013	2014	2015	2016	2017	2018	2019	2020	2021	2022	2023	2024	2025
Revenue	16.590	15.811	13.986	16.012	20.951	25.228	37.665	45.987	37.665	22.222	39.161	28.811	34.163	34.206	34.528	33.820	30.790	32.730	36.616	36.546	44.560	59.339	47.365	46.254	53.512	58.283
Net income	3.067	2.310	2.114	3.005	4.553	5.609	9.398	11.407	2.041	12.192	7.713	2.510	7.292	7.726	8.077	5.568	7.087	3.685	9.860	7.897	8.915	21.151	10.764	7.907	13.525	16.300
Assets	290	312	356	404	531	707	838	1,120	885	849	911	923	939	912	855	861	861	917	932	992	1,163	1,464	1,442	1,642	1,676	1,809
Headcount	22.7	22.7	19.7	19.5	20.7	23.6	26.5	30.5	30.1	32.5	35.7	33.3	32.4	32.9	34.0	36.8	34.4	36.6	36.6	38.3	40.5	43.9	48.5	45.3	46.5	47.4

Note: Financial data in billions of US dollars and employee data in thousands. The data is sourced from the company's SEC Form 10-K from 2000 to 2025.

== Legal and regulatory issues ==
=== 2003 global analyst research settlement ===
In 2003, Goldman Sachs resolved regulatory and civil claims regarding conflicts of interest between its equity research and investment banking businesses during the dot-com bubble. This included a $110 million payment as part of the multi-firm global analyst research settlement with the SEC and state regulators, alongside minor multi-bank class-action settlements concerning research coverage of specific entities including Exodus Communications and RSL Communications.

=== 2008 financial crisis: Conflict of interest in Abacus mortgage-backed CDOs ===
Unlike many investors and investment banks, Goldman Sachs anticipated the subprime mortgage crisis. The company developed investments called synthetic CDOs, originally intended to protect Goldman Sachs from investment losses in the housing market. However, during the subprime mortgage crisis and the 2008 financial crisis, instead of warning its clients of the risks of investing in subprime debt, the company bet against its own clients, primarily insurance companies and pension funds, and profited, leading to allegations of a conflict of interest.

Goldman Sachs was accused of setting up and shorting the $800 million Hudson Mezzanine CDO, issued in 2006, with the goal of removing subprime securities from its books. While the prospectus of the CDO described the portfolio contents as assets sourced from the secondary market, critics noted the selection effectively acted as a short position against investments owned by the company. Following subsequent mortgage defaults, holders of the long position paid out approximately $310 million to the counterparties holding the short position.

Goldman Sachs claimed that it shorted simply to hedge its long positions and was not expecting the CDOs to fail. It also denied that its investors were unaware of Goldman Sachs's bets against the products.

==== Civil fraud lawsuit by the SEC; $550 million settlement ====
In April 2010, the United States Securities and Exchange Commission (SEC) charged Goldman Sachs and one of its vice presidents, Fabrice Tourre, with securities fraud in the case of SEC v. Goldman Sachs. The 3-2 vote by the SEC to bring charges was along party lines, with the 2 Democrats and 1 independent voting in favor of bringing charges. The SEC alleged that Goldman Sachs had told buyers of a synthetic CDO that the underlying assets in the investment had been picked by an independent CDO manager, ACA Management. However, Paulson & Co., a hedge fund intending to bet against the investment, played a significant role in selecting the reference portfolio.

The specific synthetic CDO at the center of the SEC's 2010 suit was Abacus 2007-AC1. Unlike many of the Abacus securities, 2007-AC1 Goldman Sachs was not short; Goldman Sachs actually lost money on the deal. The short position was taken by John Paulson, who allegedly hired Goldman Sachs to issue the security. Paulson and his employees selected 90 BBB-rated mortgage bonds that they anticipated would decline in value to maximize the return on their short positions.

"Hedge fund manager John Paulson tells Goldman Sachs in late 2006 he wants to bet against risky subprime mortgages using derivatives. The risky mortgage bonds that Paulson wanted to short were essentially subprime home loans that had been repackaged into bonds. The bonds were rated "BBB," meaning that as the home loans defaulted, these bonds would be among the first to feel the pain."

Paulson and the manager of the CDO, ACA Management, worked on the portfolio of 90 bonds to be insured, coming to an agreement in late February 2007. ACA was allegedly unaware of Paulson's short position Paulson paid Goldman Sachs approximately US$15 million for its work in the deal. The $15 million has been described as "rent" for the Abacus name.

Paulson ultimately made a US$1 billion profit from the short investments, the profits coming from the losses of the investors and their insurers. These were primarily IKB Deutsche Industriebank (US$150 million loss), and the investors and insurers of another US$900 million—ACA Financial Guaranty Corp, ABN AMRO, and the Royal Bank of Scotland, which acquired portions of ABN AMRO.

Through April 2007 Goldman Sachs issued over 20 CDOs in its "Abacus" series worth a total of $10.9 billion. Within a year, the underlying mortgage bonds were entirely downgraded by rating agencies. These securities performed poorly for long investors; by April 2010, at least $5 billion worth of the underlying reference assets had either been downgraded to sub-investment grade ratings or defaulted.

The SEC alleged that Goldman Sachs "materially misstated and omitted facts in disclosure documents" about the financial security, including the fact that it had "permitted a client that was betting against the mortgage market [the hedge fund manager Paulson & Co.] to heavily influence which mortgage securities to include in an investment portfolio, while telling other investors that the securities were selected by an independent, objective third party," ACA Management. The SEC further alleged that "Tourre also misled ACA into believing ... that Paulson's interests in the collateral section [sic] process were aligned with ACA's, when in reality Paulson's interests were sharply conflicting."

Goldman Sachs maintained that it had not structured the portfolio to lose money, that it had provided extensive disclosure to the long investors in the CDO, that it had lost $90 million, that ACA selected the portfolio without Goldman Sachs suggesting Paulson was to be a long investor, that it did not disclose the identities of a buyer to a seller and vice versa as it was not normal business practice for a market maker, and that ACA was itself the largest purchaser of the Abacus pool, investing US$951 million. Goldman Sachs also stated that any investor losses resulted from the overall negative performance of the entire sector, rather than from a particular security in the CDO.

Arguments against Goldman Sachs included that the firm was aware of and took steps to downplay the relevance of Paulson's involvement. However, the counter argument was that the major purchasers were sophisticated investors capable of accurately assessing the risks involved, even without knowledge of the part played by Paulson.

According to testimony before the Financial Crisis Inquiry Commission, Paulson initially approached Bear Stearns to structure a similar vehicle, but the head of Bear Stearns's CDO group, Ira Wagner, rejected the proposal, stating that allowing a short investor to select the underlying collateral created an inherent conflict of interest. While Goldman Sachs maintained that it ultimately lost $90 million on the Abacus transaction, critics argue the firm held the long position only because it was unable to successfully distribute the remaining risk to secondary investors before the underlying securities defaulted.

The prospectus for the ABACUS transaction explicitly included disclaimers warning long investors that the protection buyer 'may have information, including material, non-public information' regarding the underlying reference assets which it was not providing to the long investors.

In July 2010, Goldman Sachs settled out of court, agreeing to pay $550 million, including $300 million to the United States Department of the Treasury and $250 million to investors as restitution, one of the largest penalties ever paid by a Wall Street firm. Goldman Sachs did not admit or deny wrongdoing, but did admit that its marketing materials for the investment "contained incomplete information", and agreed to change some of its business practices regarding mortgage investments. Goldman Sachs stated that its customers were aware of its bets against the mortgage-related security products it was selling, and that it only used those bets to hedge against losses.

The United States Department of Justice and the FBI did not sue the company specifically for the Abacus deal, stating that the high legal burden of proof for a criminal case could not be met based on the available law and evidence.

==== Other regulatory scrutiny and settlements ====
Goldman Sachs was subject to a dedicated hearing by the Senate Permanent Subcommittee on Investigations, which released the report Wall Street and the Financial Crisis: Anatomy of a Financial Collapse in April 2011. The report accused the firm of misleading clients and engaging in conflicts of interest by profiting from the subprime mortgage crisis at the expense of clients.

In April 2016, Goldman Sachs agreed to pay $5.06 billion to settle allegations by the United States Department of Justice that the company falsely assured investors that securities it sold were backed by sound mortgages, when it knew that they were full of mortgages that were likely to fail. The settlement included a $2.385 billion civil monetary penalty, $875 million in cash payments, and $1.8 billion in consumer relief. The settlement followed similar settlements reached with other major banks. However, no executives faced criminal prosecution.

=== 1MDB scandal ===
Between 2011 and 2013, Goldman Sachs underwrote approximately $6.5 billion in bond offerings for the Malaysian sovereign wealth fund, 1Malaysia Development Berhad (1MDB), which generated roughly $600 million in fees for the bank, 10 times the normal amount. Goldman Sachs was accused of ignoring major red flags and enabling a massive multi-billion-dollar theft by former Malaysian Prime Minister Najib Razak and Jho Low. In 2015, regulators launched investigations into the transactions, focusing on compliance failures under the Bank Secrecy Act and foreign bribery laws. In October 2020, Goldman Sachs settled the accusations by paying $2.9 billion in fines and penalties to authorities in the United States, Malaysia, Singapore, and the United Kingdom, while its Malaysian subsidiary pleaded guilty to criminal charges.

== See also ==
- Goldman Sachs Foundation—philanthropic initiatives of the company
  - 10,000 Women
  - 10,000 Small Businesses
- List of former employees of Goldman Sachs
- Goldman–Sachs family
- Goldman Sachs asset management factor model
