= Mary Murray =

Mary Murray may refer to:

- Mary Murray (ferry), Staten Island Ferry named for Mary Lindley Murray
- Mary Lindley Murray (1720–1782), American Revolution woman who held up British general William Howe
- Mary Jeanette Murray, member of the Massachusetts House of Representatives
- Mary P. Murray (born 1970), American lawyer and jurist
- Mary Howey Murray Vawter (1871–1950), née Murray, American artist, poet, and political candidate
- Mary Murray-Burke, of the Irish showband Crystal Swing
