= Ellen Sulzberger Straus =

American businesswoman/philanthropist (born 1925)

- Born: Ellen Sulzberger; March 11, 1925; Manhattan, New York, U.S.
- Died: February 24, 1995 (aged 69); Manhattan
- Education: B.A. Smith College
- Occupation: Philanthropist
- Known for: Founder of telephone help line Call for Action
- Spouse: R. Peter Straus
- Children: 4, including Diane Straus Tucker
- Family: Nathan Straus Jr. (father-in-law); Arthur Hays Sulzberger (uncle); Cyrus Leopold Sulzberger (grandfather)

Ellen Sulzberger Straus (March 11, 1925 – February 24, 1995) was an American businesswoman and philanthropist who founded the United States' first telephone help line.

== Biography ==
Ellen Sulzberger Straus was born to a Jewish family in Manhattan in 1925, the daughter of Louise Mayer Blumenthal and David Hays Sulzberger. Her uncle was The New York Times publisher Arthur Hays Sulzberger and her grandfather was the German-born merchant Cyrus Leopold Sulzberger. She had two sisters: Jean Sulzberger and Ann Sulzberger Sand. In 1945, she graduated with a B.A. from Smith College. After school, she worked as the executive secretary of the New York League of Women Voters and later on the staff of the Atomic Energy Commission eventually becoming the assistant director of public information. In 1949, she was a manager of the senate campaign of Governor Herbert H. Lehman. In the 1950s, she began writing a column for McCall's magazine.

In 1963, she founded the United States' first telephone help line, a non-profit entitled Call for Action, whose purpose was to assisting people who had problems with government officials, businesses, and landlords. She later took the endeavor national with its headquarters in Washington, D.C.; the help line served as the example for similar efforts nationwide. In 1983, she conducted an exclusive interview with Jean Harris, the murderer of "Scarsdale Diet" doctor Herman Tarnower which she developed into a radio series. She and her husband owned the Manhattan-based radio station WMCA (AM) which her husband inherited in 1961; they sold the station in 1986. In 1986, she founded the management and consulting firm, Executive Service Strategies, where she served as president until her death. She also worked as the Geneva, Switzerland correspondent for several New York newspapers while living in Switzerland where her husband worked for the International Labour Organization.

Straus worked on the presidential primary campaigns of senator Gary Hart of Colorado in 1984 and former Arizona governor Bruce Babbitt in 1988. She received public service awards from the American Jewish Congress, the National Council of Jewish Women, and the National Organization for Women.

== Personal life ==
Sulzberger Straus was married to R. Peter Straus, chairman of Straus Communications, son of New York State senator Nathan Straus Jr., grandson of Nathan Straus (co-owner of department store chains, R. H. Macy & Company and Abraham & Straus); grandson of neurologist Bernard Sachs (for which Tay–Sachs disease is named), and great-nephew of Samuel Sachs, a co-founder of Goldman Sachs. They had four children: Diane Straus Tucker; Katherine Straus Caple (married to Blair Charles Caple); Jeanne Straus Tofel (divorced from Richard Tofel); and Eric Straus (divorced from Elisabeth Natalie Sand). She died of cancer on February 24, 1995, at Memorial Sloan-Kettering Cancer Center in Manhattan.
