= Robert Murray (merchant) =

Scottish merchant (1721–1786)

- Born: 1721; Scotland
- Died: 1786 (aged 64–65); New York
- Occupations: Miller, merchant, importer and exporter, and transatlantic shipper
- Known for: Murray and Pearsall and Murray and Sansom businesses
- Spouse: Mary Lindley Murray
- Children: Of twelve children, five survived to adulthood, including Lindley Murray

Robert Murray (1721–1786), a prominent merchant, was born in Scotland and, arriving with his father John Murray from Perthshire, Scotland, moved at age one to Ireland. He immigrated with his family to Pennsylvania in 1732. Murray operated a mill as a teenager. He married Mary Lindley in 1744, and the couple moved to North Carolina about 1750. He moved to New York City in the Province of New York in 1753 and became a successful importer and exporter, ship owner, merchant, and dock owner. Murray did business with the British and was loyal to them. When he unloaded cargo from Britain, against the colonist's law, he incurred their wrath and was saved from being banned from New York by his wife, Mary Lindley Murray, who also entertained British soldiers so that a regiment of the Continental Army could safely pass a larger contingent of British soldiers. He built a mansion on Murray Hill overlooking the East River with extensive gardens.

== Early life ==
Robert Murray was born in Scotland in 1721. (Note: Monaghan states that Murray was born in County Armagh, Ireland, but his family immigrated to Ireland in 1722, the year after he was born.) His father, John, was from Perthshire, Scotland who had moved to Ireland. His father John, born about 1691 in Scotland, immigrated to Pennsylvania with his brother William, his wife, and his family immigrated to Pennsylvania in 1732. Murray's older brothers William and Samuel. His younger sister was Arabella. William's son John worked for his uncle Robert and in 1771 they became business partners of Robert and John Murray. (Note: Monaghan stated that Murray had a younger brother John Jr. that he went into business with, but it appears that his business partner John was his nephew, the son of his brother William.)

The family were members of the Old Derry Church and followers of the Westminster Confession of Faith. John bought more than 200 acres in what was then Hanover Township along Swatara Creek in 1739 and an additional warrant in 1744 in Lebanon County. As a teenager, Murray established a mill in Swatara. He lived in Paxtang Township, Lancaster County by about 1733, when Thomas Lindley purchased land near the Murrays.

== Marriage and children ==
In 1744, Murray married Mary Lindley. Murray was a Presbyterian, and converted to the Quaker faith for Mary. The Murrays stayed in Pennsylvania for several years.

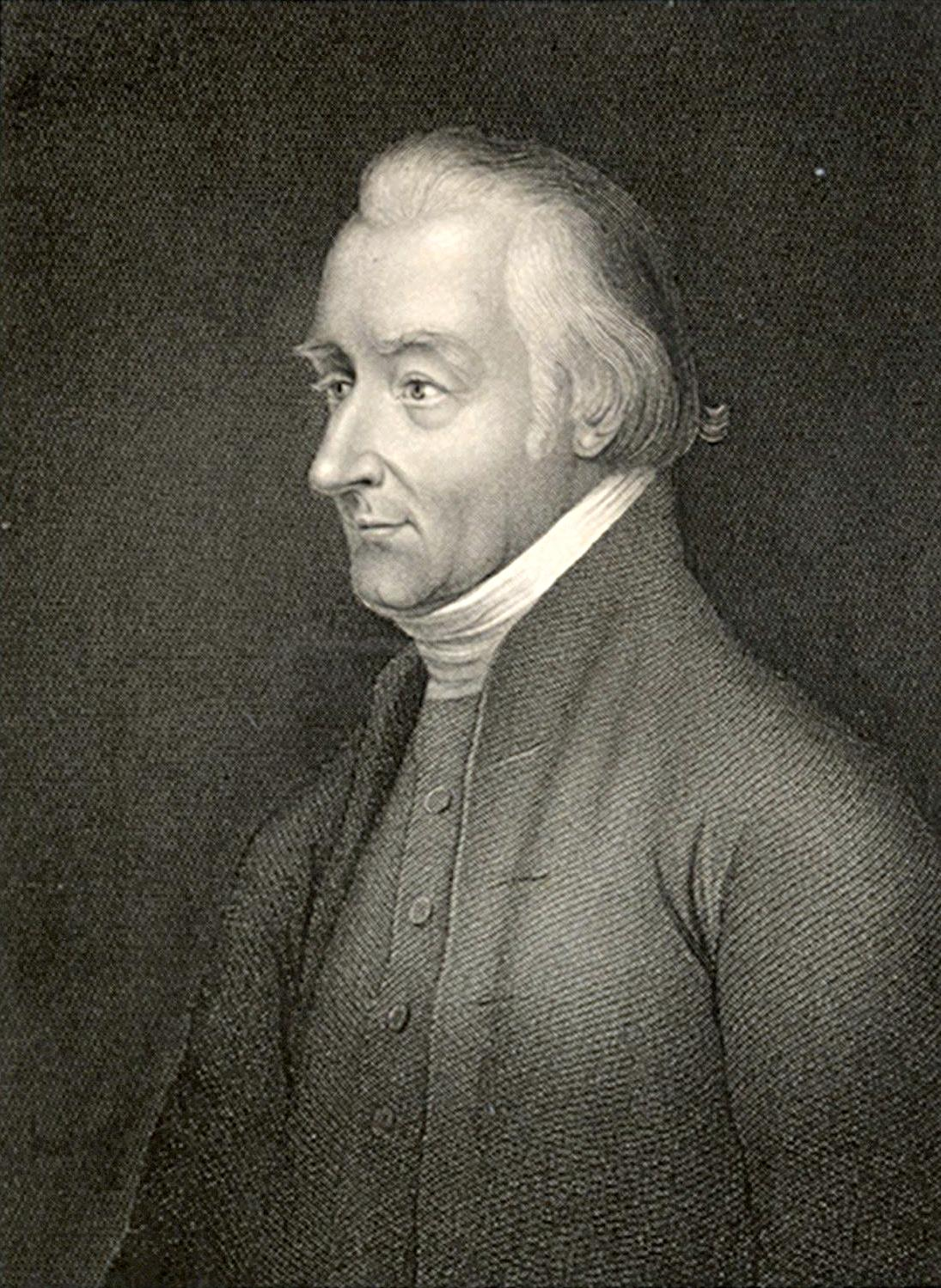
Lindley Murray (1745–1826), son of Mary (née Lindley) Murray and Robert Murray

Lindley, the first of twelve children, was born at Swatara, near Lancaster in 1745. He was a noted grammarian and author. (Note: Robert Murray had lived along Swatara Creek and worked in Swatara. The Ellet article says on page 374 that Lindley was born in "Snetara" but looks to be a mistake, there is no Snetara, Pennsylvania from Google search.) Lindley was the author of 11 books and the top selling author in the United States during the first four decades of the nineteenth century. Of Murray's twelve children, five made it to adulthood, including Lindley, John, Susannah, and Beulah, who were alive at the time of Mary's death. Susannah was married to Col. Gilbert Colden Willett, a British officer, and Beulah was married to Martin Hoffman. John married Catharine Bowne.

Lindley said of his father,

My parents were of respectable character, and in the middle station of life. My father possessed a good flour mill at Swatara, but being of enterprising spirit and anxious to provide handsomely for his family, he made several voyages to the West Indies, in the way of trade, by which he considerably augmented in property. Pursuing his inclinations, he in time acquired large possessions, and became one of the most respectable merchants in America.

== Career ==
Murray, a successful miller, was allied with other Quakers after his conversion. By 1745, he transported flour and wheat to the West Indies, which was the major import from Pennsylvania. After that, almost all of his business connections were with Quakers. After Pennsylvania, the family was among the "tide" of Quakers moving to North Carolina in the 1750s. They settled there by 1750 or 1751, and moved to New York City in 1753.

Murray was a wealthy merchant, and a partner of Murray and Pearsall, a merchandising firm. His varied businesses included operating import and export of goods via his ships, operating a merchandising firm on the East River, investing in whaling operations, selling maritime insurance, having a dock on the East River, and being a freight forwarder. Much of Murray's fortune was earned through transatlantic trade during the Seven Years' War (1756–1763) between Britain and France. An economic downturn of the trade business in 1761 occurred after the Fall of Montreal in September 1760. Murray and Pearsall were no longer in business by 23 February 1761.

Suffering from poor health and needing a milder climate, Murray and his family moved to England, living there from 1764 to late 1771 or in 1775. By this time, Lindley was married to Hannah Dobson and they moved to England, too. Murray and Philip Sansom, a British Quaker, established the Murray & Sansom trading business in London. Murray's brother, John, operated the business in New York. Murray sailed between New York City and London during this period. He was a co-founder of the New York Chamber of Commerce on 5 April 1768 and he became a member of the New York Meeting for Suffering. He sailed to London after 1 August 1769. In 1773, about four years after joining the Quaker Monthly Meeting in New York, he left the meeting. In an increasing back-and-forth between the colonies and the British, colonists fought against the British with the Boston Tea Party (16 December 1773), the British Parliament established the Intolerable Acts (took away self-governance and rights) in 1774. As anti-British sentiment grew in the days leading up to the American Revolutionary War, Murray was subject to agreements in the colony against British trade, ultimately leading to the First Continental Congress (5 September to 26 October 1774) and the War for Independence (1775–1783).

== Inclenberg ==
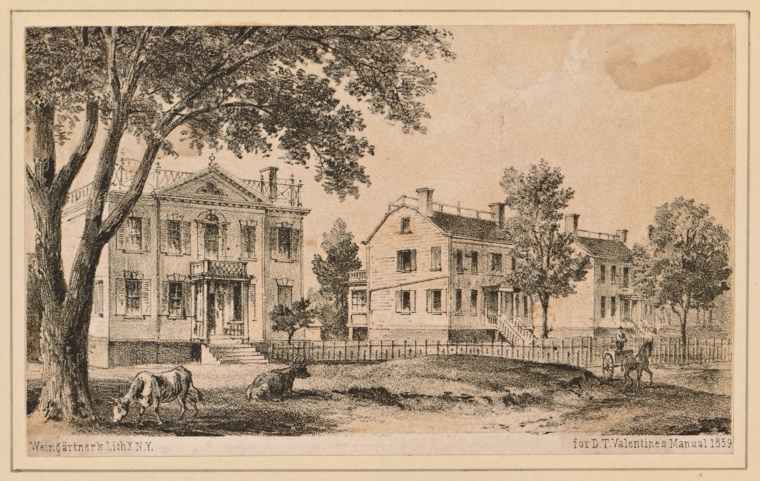
Robert Murray's Inclenberg around 1859

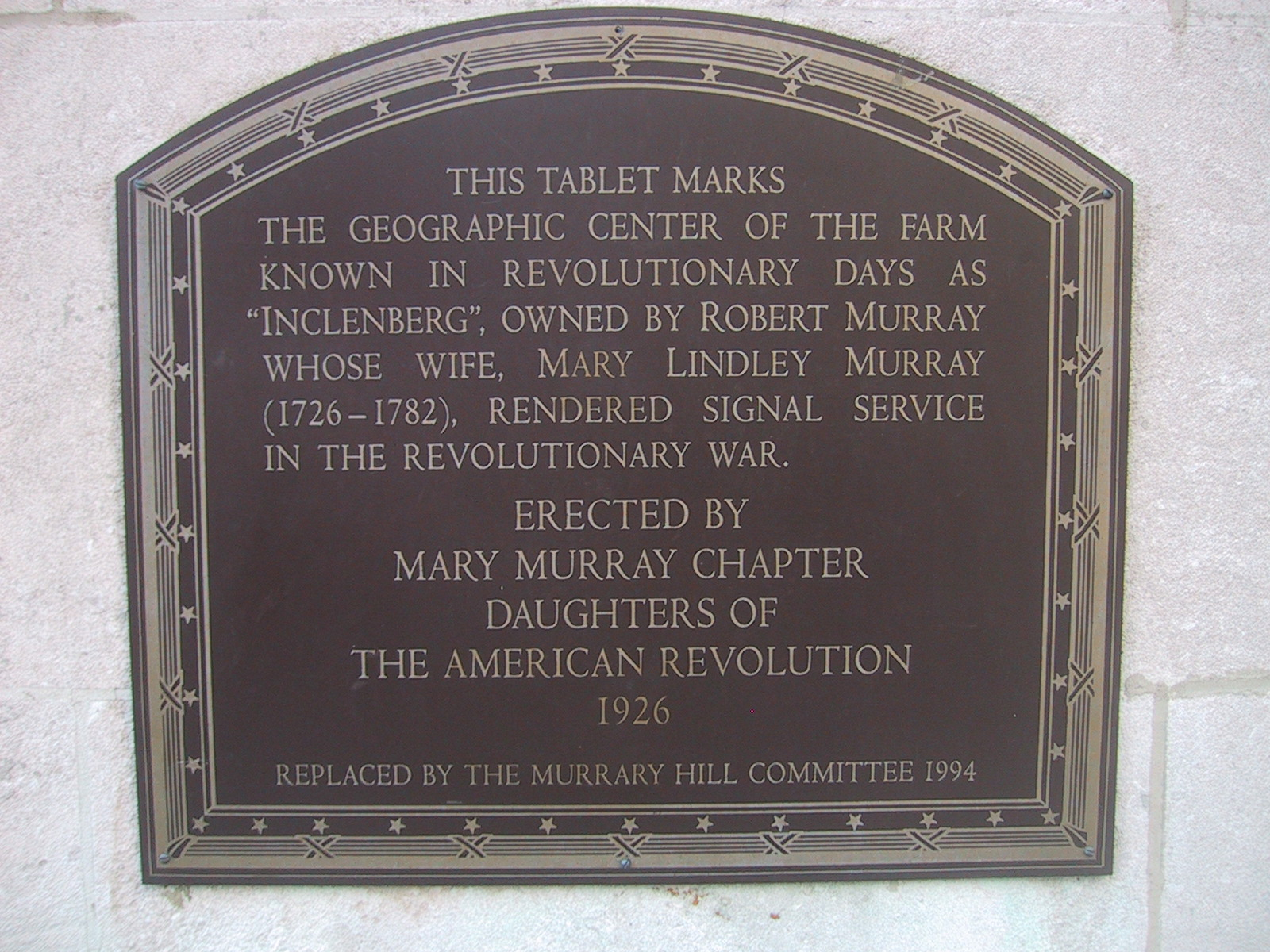
DAR plaque on 37th Street at Park Avenue in Manhattan

The Murrays lived north of "town" (now called Lower Manhattan), in what was considered the country. They lived on their 29-acre estate called Belmont, also known as Inclenberg (Dutch for beautiful hill), in Murray Hill. The area named for the Murrays. Their two-story house, built about 1762, sat at what is now the corner of 37th Street and Park Avenue. It was situated with the East River on the east side. Extensive gardens and lawn on the north and south sides, overlooked Kips Bay and the East River. An avenue of spruce, elm, magnolia, and poplar trees led to the residence. The Murrays entertained international travelers, like the Tunisian ambassador, who arrived in New York with letters of introduction for the Murrays.

== Prelude to the war ==
The Thirteen Colonies enacted Article 10 of the Continental Association, forbidding the receipt of goods from Britain as of 1 February 1775. That month, two ships anchored at Murray's docks. The first attempted to dock was made by the James, but was discouraged by the nonimportation forces (patriots) on shore until the British navy helped them dock, but they were unable to unload their cargo of household goods and coal and the ship left on 11 February. A ship owned by Murray and Sansom tried later to dock with the assistance of the Custom House. Attempting to dock and unload goods clandestinely, the Murrays were seen as Loyalists, against the patriots. On 17 February, Robert Murray's ship, the Beulah waited in the waters near New York City, blocked by a patrol boat, and attempted to unload up to two tons of goods to a ship sent from Elizabeth, New Jersey to meet them at Staten Island. After an investigation, Robert and John Murray were found to be guilty and, among their prices that they had to pay, many wanted them banned from New York. Mary, known to be a Whig, wrote a letter to the Committee of Sixty of the ways the wives and children would be harmed if her husband and brother-in-law were banned from the city. Her letter worked, the Murrays stayed in the city.

== Revolutionary war ==
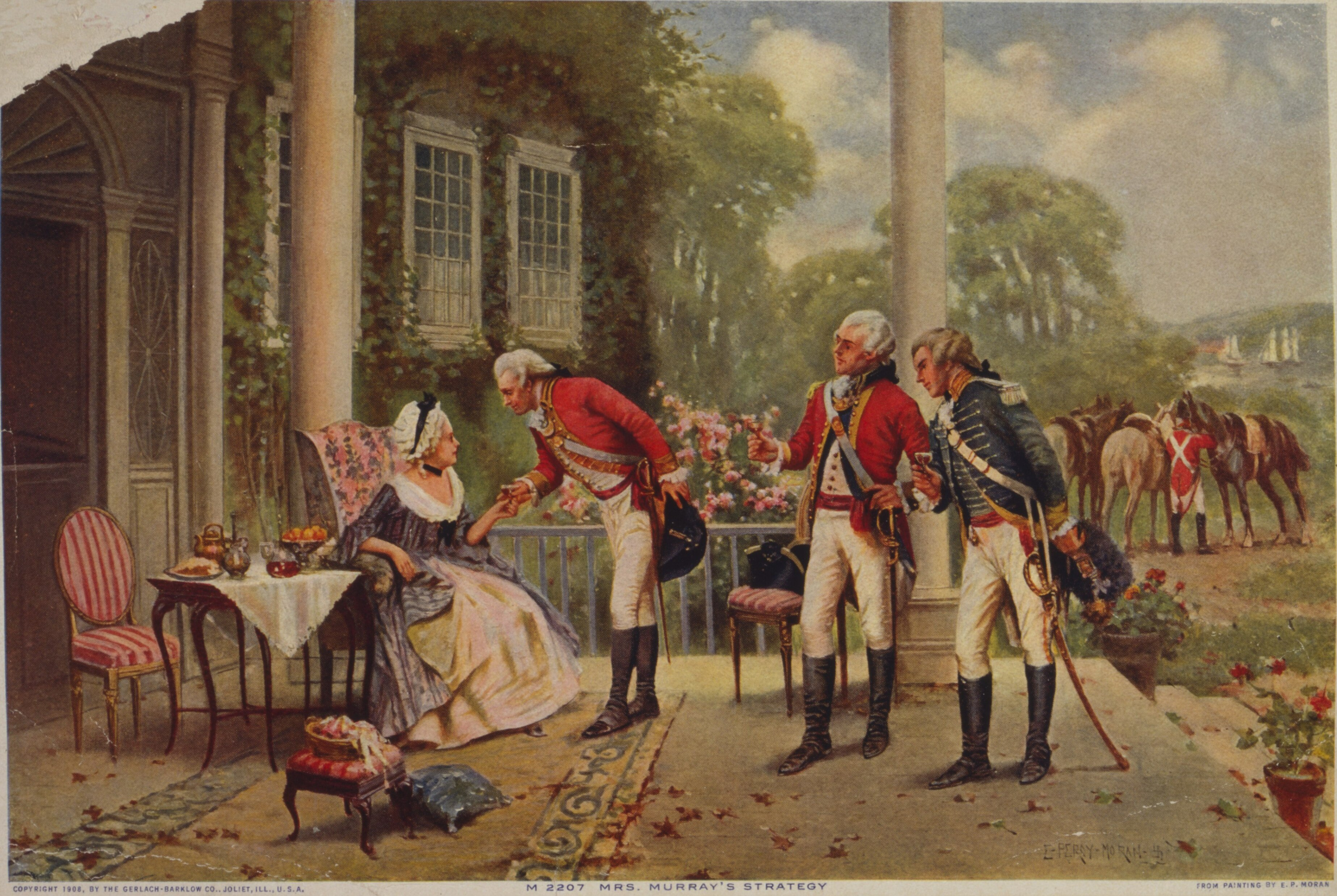
From a painting by E. Percy Moran, Mrs. Murray's strategy, Murray entertaining British soldiers, on porch, during the American Revolution.

Robert's wife, Mary Lindley Murray, is credited with delaying William Howe and his army during General Washington's retreat from New York in 1776. As the story goes, Mary invited the group to tea at her mansion, Inclenberg, and, succeeded in delaying the British troops for a period sufficient to allow a successful retreat of General Israel Putnam of the Continental Army and 3,500 soldiers. Mary was a patriot and Murray sided with The Crown.

== Death and legacy ==
Murray died on August 2 [O.S. July 22] 1786 in New York.

Friends Seminary, a continuously operating co-educational K-12 Quaker school in Manhattan, was founded in 1786 through a bequest from Murray.

== Bibliography ==
- Humphrey, Grace (1968). Women in American history. Freeport, New York: Books for Libraries Press.
- Monaghan, Charles (1998). "The Murrays of Murray Hill: A New York Quaker Family Before, During and After the Revolution". Quaker History. 87 (1): 35–56. ISSN 0033-5053. JSTOR 41947373.
