= English Reader or Pieces in Prose and Poetry: Selected from the Best Writers Designed to Assist Young Persons to Read =

The English Reader: or, Pieces in Prose and Poetry, Selected from the Best Writers Designed to Assist Young Persons to Read with Propriety and Effect; to Improve Their Language and Sentiments; and to Inculcate Some of the Most Important Principles of Piety and Virtue. : With a Few Preliminary Observations on the Principles of Good Reading. by Lindley Murray is an eighteenth century textbook written in 1799 and published in the United States. The volume is one of the most widely held in American libraries. The book is available in the public domain.
