= Lindley Murray =

American grammarian and lawyer (1745–1826)

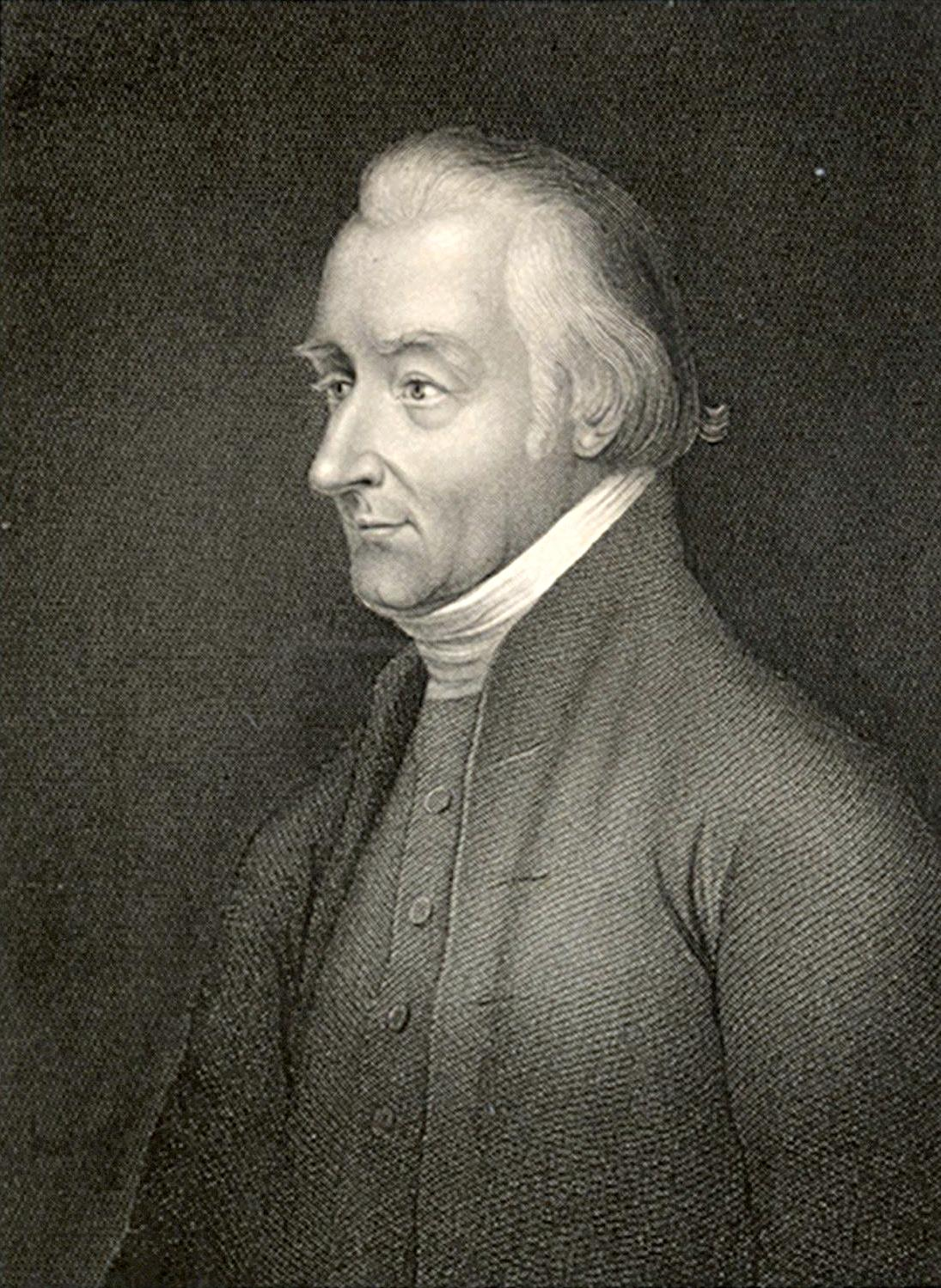
- Born: 1745 (Note: Sources list multiple dates of birth for Murray: A 7 June 1745 date of birth is stated on Pennsylvania Historical Markers, in a 1996 edition of his memoirs, and in another source.; Another date is 22 April 1745.; Lindly states that the dates for Robert, Mary and their children came from an old Murray Bible. The entry for Lindley Murray is "b. 27 of 3rd mo. O.S. of 1745". (27 March 1745 Old Style corresponds to 7 April 1745 New Style). This appears to be a self-published genealogical book.; His year of birth is uniformly 1745.); Harper Tavern, near Swatara Township, Lebanon County, Pennsylvania (Note: Harper Tavern, East Hanover Township, Lebanon County, Pennsylvania, is located on Swatara Creek near Swatara Township, Lebanon County, Pennsylvania.)
- Died: 16 February 1826 (aged 80–81) (Note: The Dictionary of National Biography stated that he died on 16 January 1826.); Holgate, York, England
- Occupations: Lawyer, merchant, grammarian, and author
- Known for: English Grammar
- Spouse: Hannah Dobson (m. 1767)
- Parent(s): Robert Murray and Mary Lindley Murray

Lindley Murray (1745 – 16 February 1826) was an American Quaker lawyer, writer, and grammarian, best known for his English-language grammar books used in schools in England and the United States.

Murray practised law in New York. As the colonies began to fight for independence with the American Revolution (1765–1783) and in the lead-up to the Revolutionary War, Murray sat on the Committee of Sixty and the Committee of One Hundred to manage events in the Province of New York. Some Quakers did not want him to be associated with a public committee. Still, he sat on the committee to protect his family's shipping interests, which would be inhibited by the Continental Association's nonimportation clause. Murray spent the first half of the Revolutionary War in Islip, Long Island, living leisurely. With British troops in control of Manhattan, Murray returned to the island and joined his father in the import-export and shipping businesses that made him rich during the second half of the war.

In 1783, Murray retired, and one year later, he left America for England. Settling at Holgate, near York, he devoted the rest of his life to literary pursuits. His first book was Power of Religion on the Mind (1787). In 1795, he issued his Grammar of the English Language. This was followed by English Exercises, and the English Reader. These books passed through several editions, and the Grammar was the standard textbook for fifty years throughout England and America. While he was able, he was an active member of the local Quaker Meeting.

== Colonial America ==
=== Early life and education ===
Lindley Murray was born in 1745, in Harper Tavern, near Swatara Township, Lebanon County, Pennsylvania, His father, Robert Murray, a Quaker, was one of the leading New York merchants. His mother, Mary Lindley Murray, was a Quaker. Mary's father, Thomas Lindley, also a member of the Society of Friends, immigrated from Ireland to Pennsylvania in 1718. Lindley was the eldest of the Murrays' twelve children, five of whom made it to adulthood. They included Lindley, John, Susannah, and Beulah, who were alive at the time of their mother's death. Susannah was married to Col. Gilbert Colden Willett, a British officer, and Beulah was married to Martin Hoffman. John married Catharine Bowne.

As he was growing up, Murray saw and met with people from around the world and heard the latest news of those who visited his parents. He received an education founded on values of the Age of Enlightenment. When six years old, he was sent to a Quaker school in Philadelphia, but soon departed for North Carolina with his parents, where they lived until 1753. They then moved to New York, where Murray attended school, but it proved difficult. Against his wishes, at fourteen, he was sent to work at his father's accounting firm; Murray was mainly interested in science and literature. He left home to study at a Burlington, New Jersey boardingschool, and started to study French. His parents brought him back to New York and hired a private tutor. His father still wanted him to go into business, but in a letter, Lindley argued so convincingly for a literary career that his father's lawyer suggested letting Murray study law.

=== Law career ===
In 1761, Murray studied law under Samuel Kissam, his father's attorney and John Jay's teacher. Murray passed the bar in 1765 and established his law practice in the Province of New York in 1767. He joined the Debating Club to exchange viewpoints, as did Jay and other sons of prominent families. Murray left his practice to live on Long Island for the first four years of the Revolutionary War. He returned to New York in 1779. Murray retired in 1783.

=== Marital life ===
Murray was married on 22 June 1767, in New York City, to Hannah Dobson, the daughter of Thomas Dobson. They had no children. Murray was a Quaker throughout his life.

Murray and his wife followed his father to England by 1770 and lived there for up to four years. Once he returned to Colonial America, he was among the Quaker founders and a director of the Union Library Society, with about 1,000 volumes.

== American Revolution ==
Conflicts between colonists and their British rulers led to the American Revolutionary War. The colonists who wanted to break away from British governance were patriots; those who remained loyal to The Crown were loyalists. A nonimportation clause of Article 10 of the Continental Association called for a complete ban on British goods effective 1 February 1775. The Committee of Sixty in New York saw it as their mission to prevent British goods from being unloaded from ships onto Colonial land. According to Monaghan, Murray joined the committee to protect his family's import and shipping-related businesses, and it is not likely that he was a patriot. Not all of the members were patriots; about 22 committee members became loyalists.

Murray's father, Robert, tried to have British goods unloaded starting 1 February, when a ship arrived at his dock, but was unsuccessful. In the middle of the month, a ship that he owned, with his goods from Britain on it, was prevented from docking. Robert sent a ship from his business in Elizabeth, New Jersey to come alongside the loaded Beulah near Staten Island. Murray family members and crew from the ships unloaded 1.5 or 2 tons of cargo onto the ship from Elizabeth. The clandestine event was discovered, harming Robert's and other Murray family members' reputation and financial position. The Committee of Sixty were faulted by other colonies for not preventing the ship from being unloaded. Robert was nearly banned from the city.

The Committee of Sixty grew to the Committee of One Hundred and Murray remained on the committee, although he continued to get pressure from Quakers to remove himself from the public committee. He dealt with the anger that some of the city's residents had about the Beulah affair.

With the outbreak of the American Revolutionary War (19 April 1775 – 3 September 1783), Murray went with his wife to Islip, Long Island, where they lived for four years, fishing, shooting, and sailing. He returned to New York in 1779. (Note: The Dictionary of National Biography states that he returned to New York City after the Declaration of Independence (2 July 1776).)

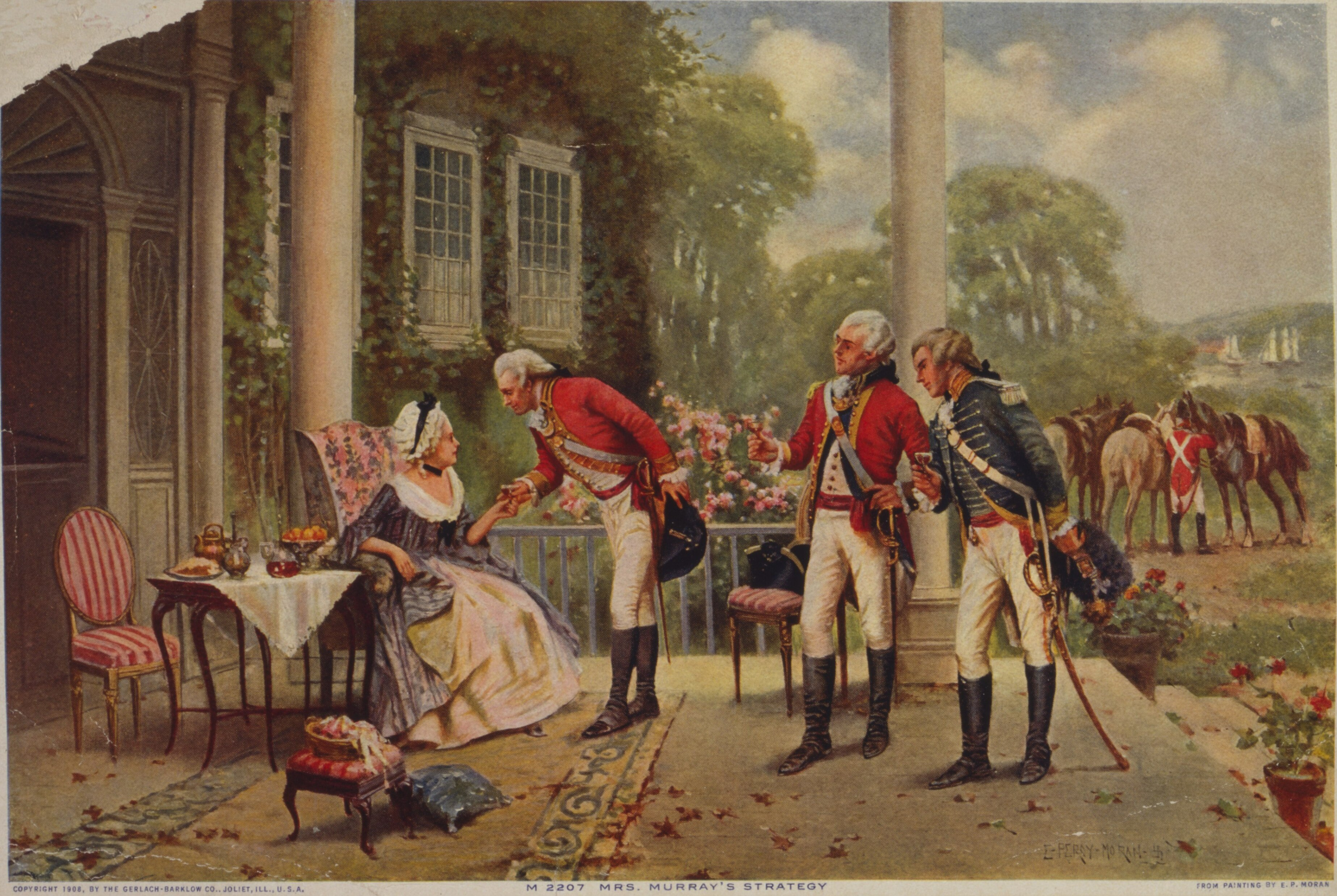
From a painting by E. Percy Moran, Mrs. Murray's strategy, Mary Lindley Murray entertaining British soldiers on the porch during the American Revolution to prevent them from fighting against the outnumbered patriots in the area.

Murray left the city that was in turmoil at the beginning of the war. Over the time he was gone, the British gained control of the city. Since he was considered to be loyal to the British troops, he may have lived in the city safely. In 1779, Murray decided to work for his father, Robert Murray, as a merchant. Murray earned a fortune by the end of the war. The British troops left the city after the signing of the Treaty of Paris (3 September 1783). Once the soldiers left the city, loyalists did not benefit from their protection.

After he retired, Murray and his wife Hannah moved to a manor that he named Bellevue. (Bellevue Hospital is named after the estate.) His estate was near his father, about 3 miles (4.8 km) north of the city (now Lower Manhattan). He had developed a painful muscular problem, and had little success with treatments he received.

== England ==
=== Later years ===
In hopes of improving his health, Murray and his wife left America and moved to England for a milder climate in the summer of 1784. He never returned. Murray was a recorded minister of the York Monthly Meeting for eleven years until his voice failed. For the last 16 years of his life, he never left the house. Murray died on 16 February 1826, near York, England. Hannah died on 25 September 1834.

=== Literary pursuits ===
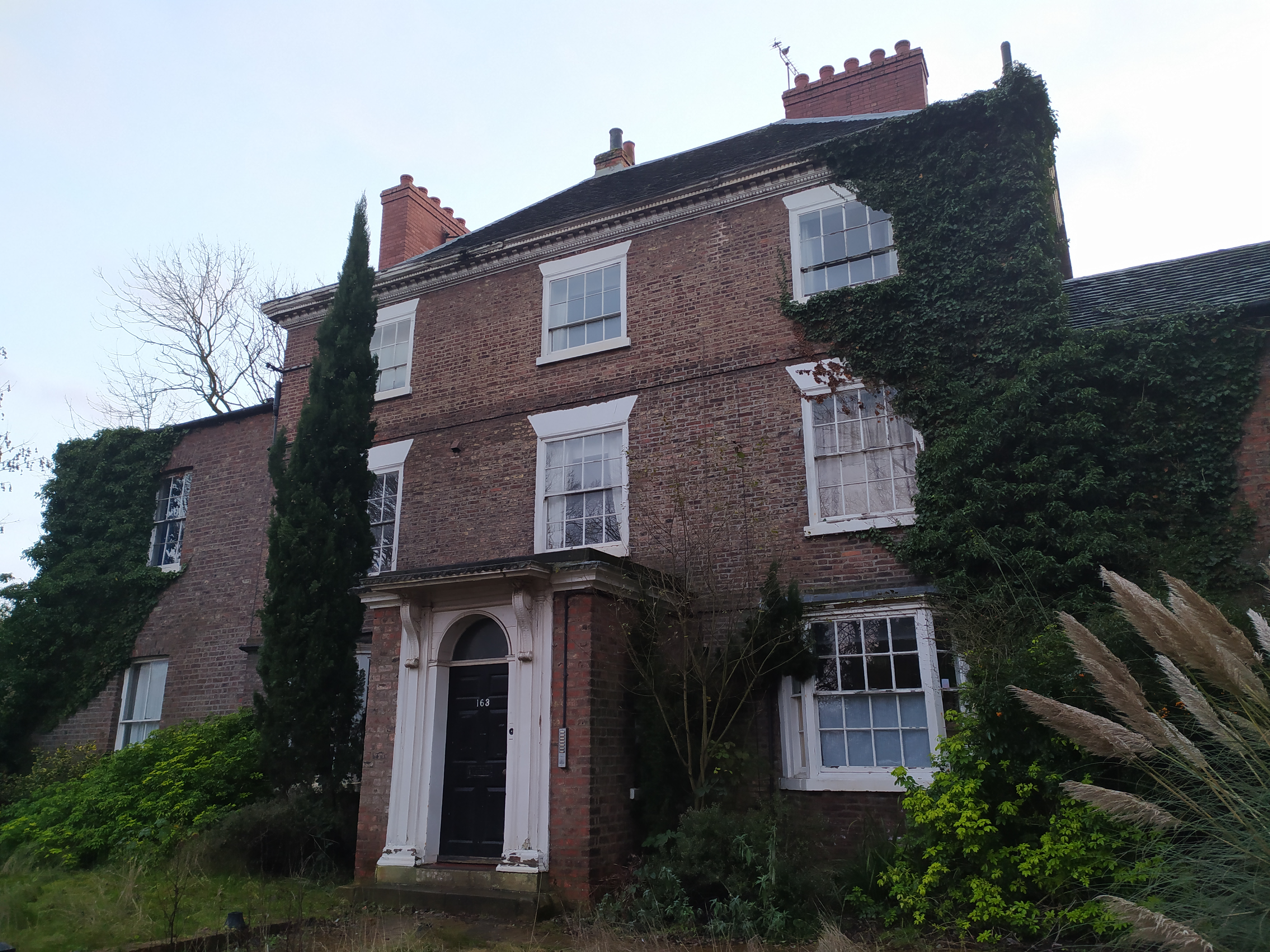
Holgate House, built in 1774, in the Holgate area of York

External image
- Edward Westoby, Lindley Murray, miniature watercolour, University of Leeds

In England, he spent his time in literary pursuits at Holgate House, near York. His library became noted for its theological, philological (English linguistics), and historical treasures. He studied botany, and his garden was said to have more varieties of plants than the Royal Gardens at Kew. He composed his grammar books there in the summer house at Holgate House.

Murray's first published work, The Power of Religion on the Mind was originally published in 1787, and it was in its 20th edition in 1842. It was twice translated into French. "Extracts from the Writings of divers Eminent Men representing the Evils of Stage Plays, &c." was added to the 8th edition in 1795.

As requested by teachers at a Friends' school for girls in York, he wrote suitable lesson books, including his English Grammar that was published in 1795. The work became rapidly popular; it went through nearly fifty editions, was edited, abridged, simplified, and enlarged in England and America, and for a long time was used in schools to the exclusion of all other grammar books. Influenced by the Scottish Enlightenment, Murray's book won Abraham Lincoln's approval and is said to have inspired anti-slavery sentiment in America and abroad.

In 1816, an edition corrected by the author was issued in 2 volumes. An 'Abridgment' of this version by Murray, issued two years later, went through more than 120 editions of 10,000 each. In 1835, it was printed at the New England Institution for the Blind in embossed characters. Two years later, it was translated into Marathi and published in Bombay. English Exercises followed (1797), with A Key (1847). Murray's English Reader, Sequel, and Introduction, issued respectively in 1799, 1800, and 1801, were equally successful, as well as the Lecteur Francais, 1802, and Introduction to the Lecteur Francais, 1807. An English Spelling Book, 1804, and was translated into Spanish (1841). First Book for Children was published with portrait and woodcuts in 1859. In addition to the praises that his works elicited, he was criticised for his failure to provide sufficient etymology and to have published mistakes.

The sales of the Grammar, Exercises, Key, and Lecteur Francais brought Murray in each case £700, and he devoted the whole sum to philanthropic objects. The copyright of his religious works he presented to his publishers. By his will, a sum of money for the purchase and distribution of religious literature was vested in trustees in America. When the Retreat for the Insane was founded in York by William Tuke in 1792, Murray continued Tuke's efforts to introduce a humane system of treatment.

=== Works ===
- Extracts from the Writings of Divers Eminent Authors, of Different Religious Denominations; and at Various Periods of Time, Representing the Evils and Pernicious Effects of Stage Plays, and Other Vain Amusements, 1787.
- The Power of Religion on the Mind In Retirement, Sickness, and at Death; Exemplified in the Testimonies and Experience of Men Distinguished by Their Greatness, Learning, or Virtue, 1787.
- English Grammar Adapted to the Different Classes of Learners. With an Appendix, Containing Rules and Observations, for Assisting the More Advanced Students to Write with Perspicuity and Accuracy, 1795. 1824 edition.
- English Exercises: Adapted to the Grammar Lately Published by L. Murray: Consisting of Exemplifications of the Parts of Speech, Instances of False Orthography, Violations of the Rules of Syntax, Defects in Punctuation, and Violations of the Rules Respecting Perspicuity and Accuracy: Designed for the Benefit of Private Learners, As Well As for the Use of Schools, 1797.
- The Beauties of Prose and Verse Selected from the Most Eminent Authors, 1798.
- The English Reader: or, Pieces in Prose and Poetry, Selected from the Best Writers Designed to Assist Young Persons to Read with Propriety and Effect; to Improve Their Language and Sentiments; and to Inculcate Some of the Most Important Principles of Piety and Virtue. : With a Few Preliminary Observations on the Principles of Good Reading, 1799.
- Sequel to The English Reader Or, Elegant Selections in Prose and Poetry. Designed to Improve the Highest Class of Learners in Reading, 1800.

== Legacy ==
There are two historical markers for Murray in Harper Tavern, Lebanon County, Pennsylvania on PA 934, one of them .2 mile north of US 22. The other at the corner of Bellegrove Road (PA 934) & Jonestown Road. Both markers have the same wording: "Famous grammarian, author of the English Grammar, was born 7 June 1745, in a house near this point. Robert Murray, his father, owned a mill here from 1745 to 1746."

Built in 1850, the one-room Lindley Murray schoolhouse of East Hanover Township, Lebanon County, Pennsylvania, was named for Murray.

Murray's will established a testamentary trust with purposes including the education of Black persons and Native Americans, distribution of Christian books, and relief of the poor. The trust is now managed by the New York Yearly Meeting and still supports its original goals.

== Bibliography ==
- Monaghan, Charles (1998). "The Murrays of Murray Hill: A New York Quaker Family Before, During and After the Revolution". Quaker History. 87 (1): 35–56. ISSN 0033-5053. JSTOR 41947373.
