= R. Peter Straus =

American media proprietor (1923–2012)

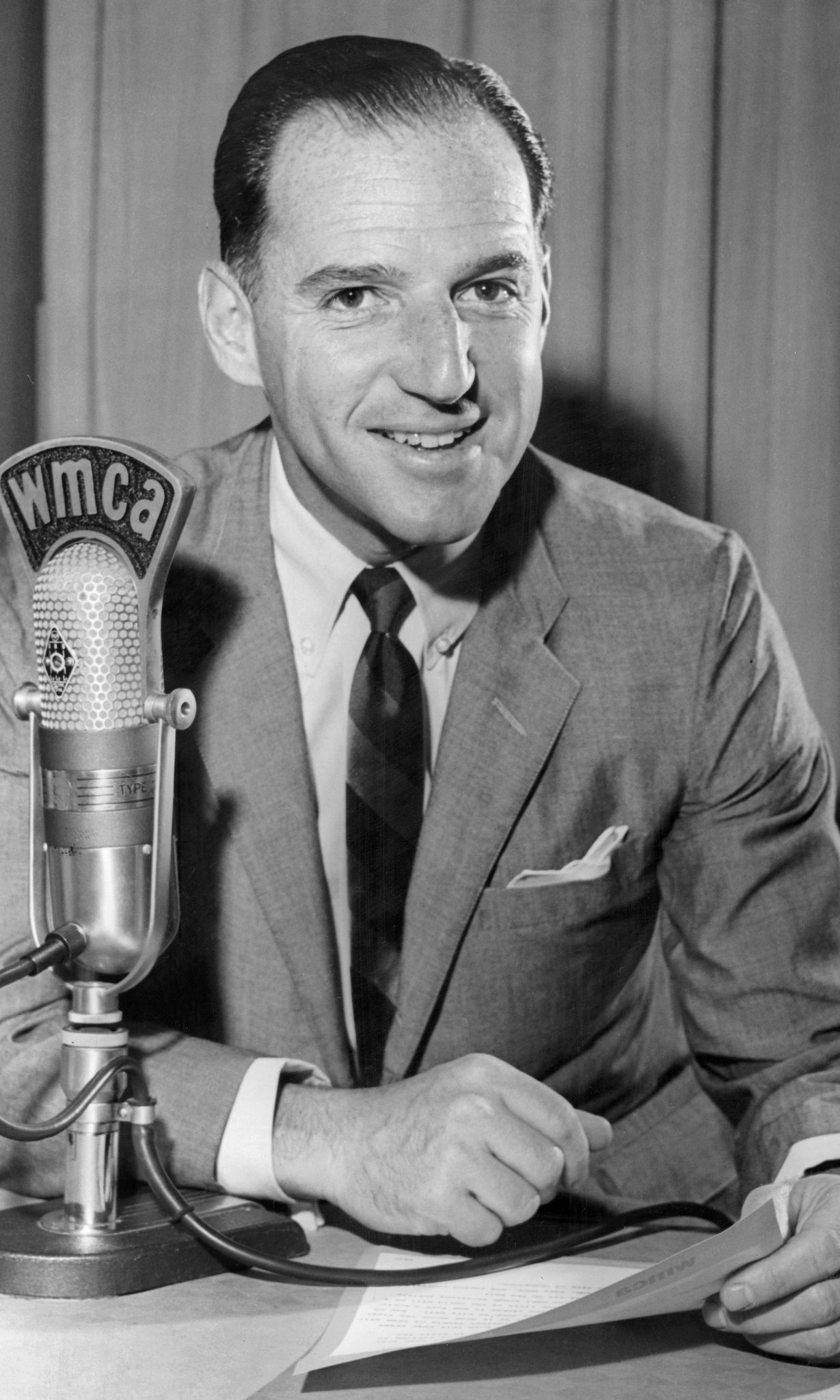
- Straus c. 1963
- Born: February 15, 1923; Manhattan, New York City, U.S.
- Died: August 6, 2012 (aged 89); Manhattan, New York City, U.S.
- Education: Lincoln School; Riverdale Country School; Loomis Chaffee School
- Alma mater: Yale University
- Occupation: Media proprietor
- Spouse(s): Ellen Louise Sulzberger; Marcia Lewis
- Children: 4, including Diane Straus
- Parent(s): Nathan Straus Jr. Helen Sachs
- Relatives: Straus family

Ronald Peter Straus (February 15, 1923 – August 6, 2012) was an American media proprietor. He was the president of WMCA, a radio station in New York City, and the chairman of Straus News, a publisher of newspapers in New York, New Jersey, and Pennsylvania. He was the director of Voice of America from 1977 to 1979.

== Early life ==
Ronald Peter Straus was born on February 15, 1923, in Manhattan, New York City. His father, Nathan Straus Jr., was a state senator and the owner of WMCA a radio station in New York City, he was of German-Jewish origins. His mother was Helen Sachs, daughter of Bernard Sachs, a neurologist for whom Tay–Sachs disease is named, and niece of Samuel Sachs, co founder of Goldman Sachs. His grandfather, Nathan Straus, was the owner of Macy's.

Straus graduated from Yale University in 1944, and served in the United States Air Force in Germany during World War II.

== Career ==
Straus began his career by working in public relations for Edward Bernays. He worked for the International Labor Office in Geneva, Switzerland, from 1950 to 1955, and was the head of its Washington office from 1955 to 1958.

Straus was appointed president of WMCA, the radio station his family owned, in 1959. According to The New York Times, he "turned it into one of the nation's most innovative radio stations, broadcasting what are regarded as the first radio editorials and political endorsements and helping to popularize rock 'n' roll."

Straus was a delegate from New York to the 1960 and 1964 Democratic National Conventions and "a longtime supporter of the Democratic Party." He was the director of African affairs at the United States Agency for International Development (USAID) from 1967 to 1969, and the director of Voice of America from 1977 to 1979. He was the author of three books.

== Straus News ==
"My daughter (Jeanne) runs the print side and my son runs the radio side. I give advice" — R. Peter Straus, 1998

When the Strauses sold WMCA in 1986, they purchased "several weekly newspapers in New York, New Jersey and Pennsylvania", and Straus became chairman of Straus News. In 1986, Straus News acquired The Warwick Advertiser, The Photo News, The Advertiser and The Vernon News. In 1988, Straus News acquired The Sparta Independent. In 1999, Straus News started The Township Journal. In 2001, Straus News started The Chronicle. In 2003, Straus News started The West Milford Messenger. In 2005, Straus News acquired The Pike County Courier. In 2011, Straus News started Dirt Magazine. By 2013, Straus News had acquired Our Town, The West Side Spirit, Chelsea Clinton News, and Our Town Downtown from Manhattan Media.

== Personal life and death ==
Straus married Ellen Louise Sulzberger, the niece of Arthur Hays Sulzberger and cousin of Arthur Ochs Sulzberger, publishers of The New York Times. They had four children: Diane Straus Tucker; Katherine Straus Caple (married to Blair Charles Caple); Jeanne Straus Tofel (divorced from Richard Tofel); and Eric Straus (married to Elisabeth Natalie Sand). Ellen died in 1995. In 1998, Straus married Marcia Lewis, the mother of Monica Lewinsky.

Straus died on August 6, 2012, in Manhattan, at 89.
