= PS 116 (Manhattan) =

Elementary school in Manhattan, New York

Public School 116
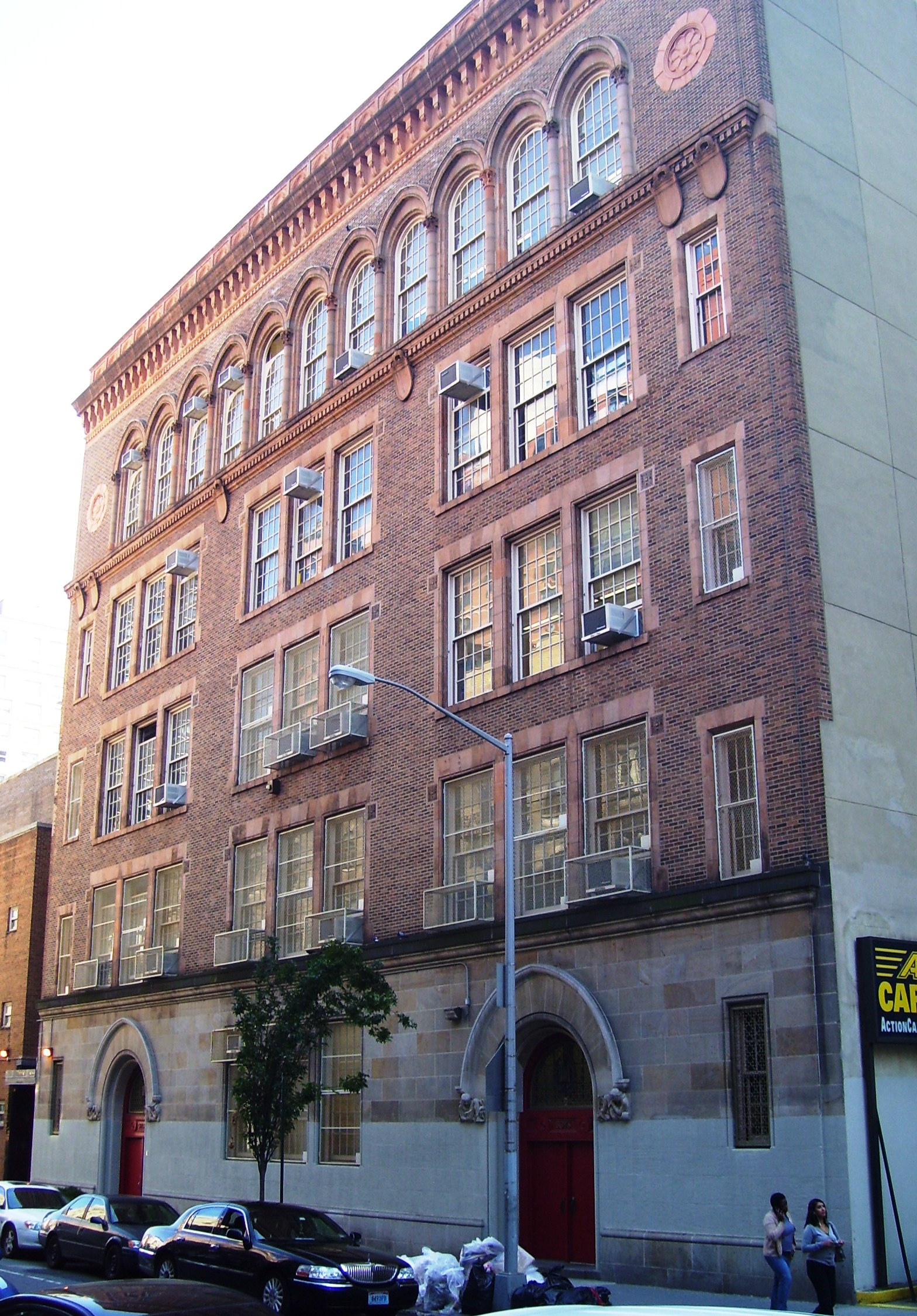
- Main school building viewed from 33rd St.

Location
- 210 East 33rd Street; Manhattan, New York City; United States; 40°44′40″N 73°58′40″W

Information
- Other name: Mary Lindley Murray School
- Former name: Primary School No. 16
- School district: 2
- Principal: Maggie Moon
- Grades: PK-5
- Website: www.ps116.org

Public School 116, the Mary Lindley Murray School, is a public school administered by the New York City Department of Education on the East Side of Manhattan, near the border between the Murray Hill and Kips Bay neighborhoods. An elementary school, it serves pupils in pre-kindergarten through fifth grade.

The school building is located on East 33rd Street between Second and Third Avenues, although the schoolyard extends through the block to East 32nd Street.

== History ==
The first school building on the site was erected on East 32nd Street, where the present schoolyard is located, in 1868. It was constructed at a location midway between two existing grammar schools that were exceeding their capacities. The 1857–62 Perris, W., Maps of the city of New York show the approximate location of the present schoolyard as a cleared site while the rest of the block is filled with typical townhouses. The 1879 Bromley, G.W. Atlas of the entire city of New York shows the site of the schoolyard with a building labeled 'Primary School No. 16.' In 1897, the former "Primary" schools in the city were renumbered and given "Public School" numbers that were 100 greater than their former Primary School numbers, which meant that Primary School No. 16 became Public School No. 116.

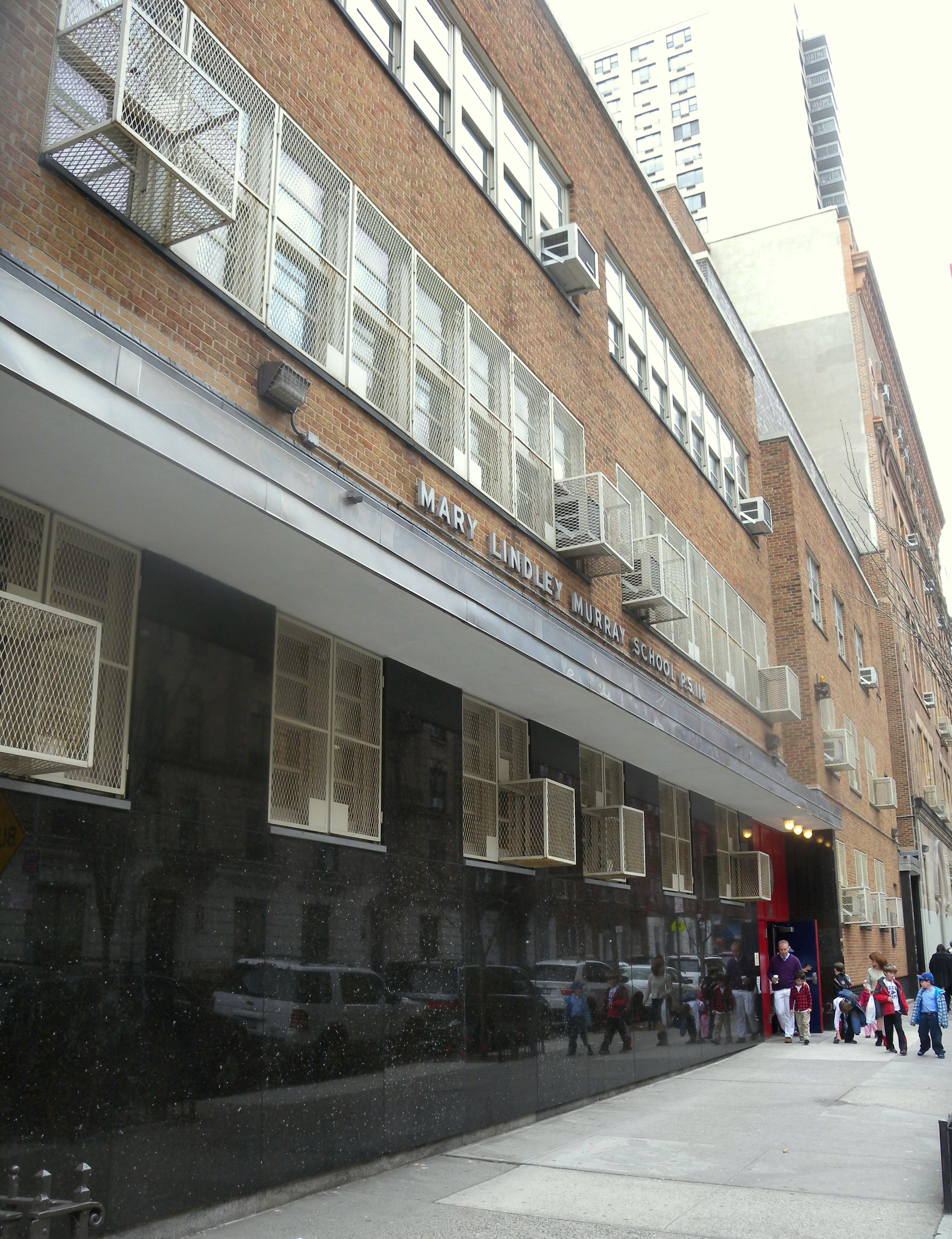
A three-story wing was added in 1960.

The current main school building was built in 1924, when the building on 33rd Street was demolished and replaced by the schoolyard. The five-story building was designed by architect William H. Gompert in the Renaissance Revival style. A three-story wing was added to the east of the building in 1960. The addition to the school was designed by architect Samuel Juster.

The school has long cultivated a diverse community. The New York Times reported in 1964 that of the school's 635 students, "Half are Spanish‐speaking, 5 per cent are Negro, 5 per cent are Chinese," and that the school community hoped to maintain its diversity among the displacement of families from the Bellevue South Urban Renewal Area, which was located between First and Second Avenues from East 23rd to 30th Streets. The P.T.A. assisted affected families in filling out applications for apartments in the Straus Houses, a housing project at Second Avenue and East 27th Street that was being constructed by the New York City Housing Authority. In 1992 it was reported that students hailed "from 50 countries" and that "30 arrived from Romania" in the last year.

In the 1960s, the school's P.T.A. was one of several community groups that sponsored the development of the East Midtown Plaza housing cooperative apartment complex in the Bellevue South Urban Renewal Area, helping to raise money to pay the initial fees and get the project started.

PS 116 had one of the first gifted and talented programs in New York, beginning with a pilot program in 1973. The gifted and talented program at PS 116 was phased out in 2012.

In 2008, a team of chess players from PS 116 won the third-grade category of the National Scholastic K-12 Championship sponsored by the United States Chess Federation.

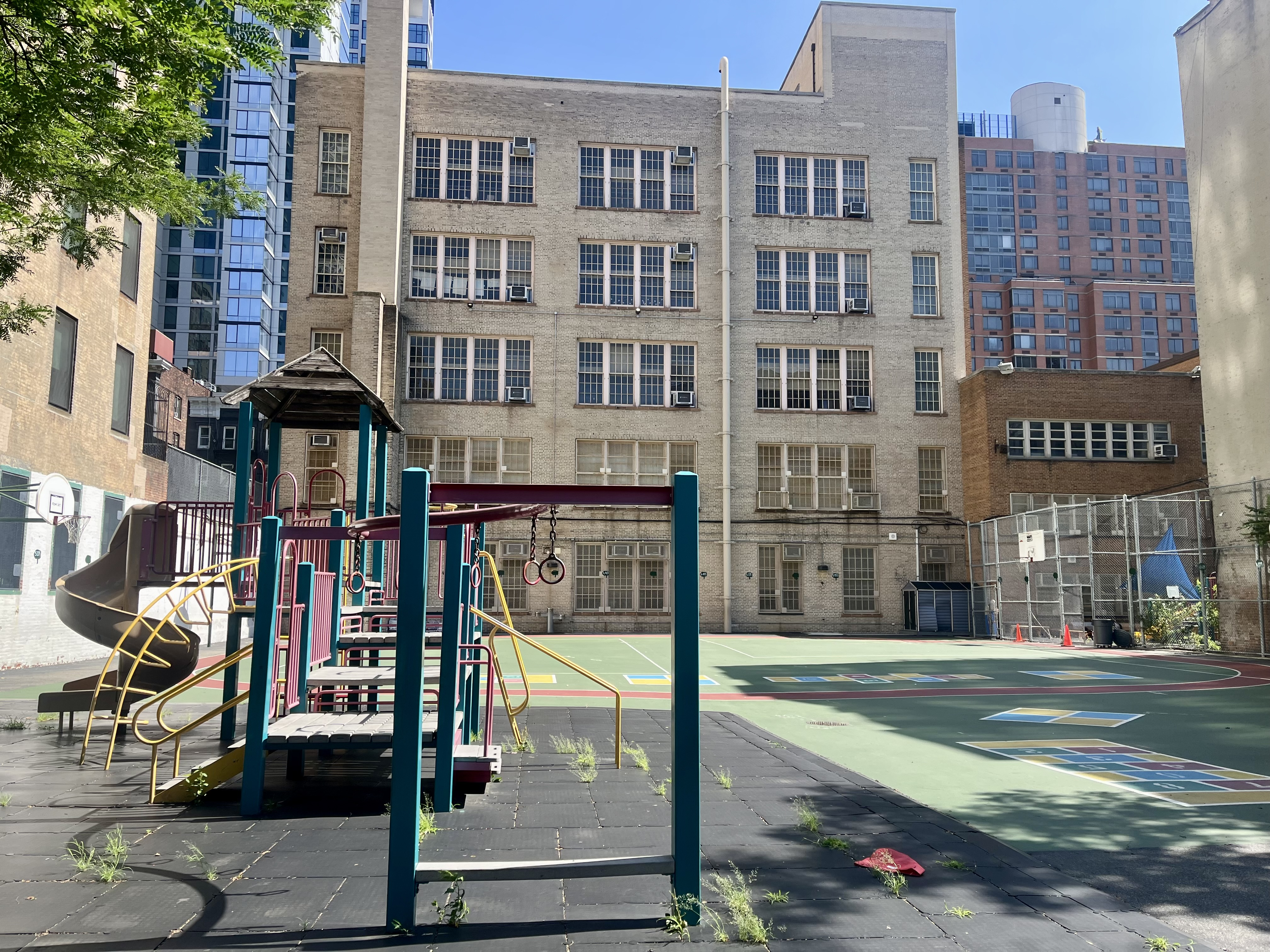
Schoolyard viewed from 32nd St.

The school suffered from overcrowding, operating at 120% of capacity in 2011, prior to the opening of the River School, which reduced the size of its attendance zone. The River School (PS 281) opened in 2013 at the corner of First Avenue and East 35th Street.

In July 2025, the city announced that PS 116's schoolyard would be opened to the public when not in use by the school as part of the city's "Schoolyards to Playgrounds" program. The fence of the schoolyard along East 32nd Street contains a rendering of PS 116's apple tree logo, which was created by graphic artist Milton Glaser. From 1965 until 2019, Glaser's office was located at 207 East 32nd Street, the building which abuts the west side of the schoolyard.

== Notable alumni ==
- Alicia Keys
