= Diane Straus =

American magazine publisher (1951-2017)

- Born: October 23, 1951; Manhattan, New York City, U.S.
- Died: December 20, 2017 (aged 66); Washington, D.C., U.S.
- Education: Yale University
- Occupation: Magazine publisher
- Spouse: Carll Tucker
- Children: 3
- Parents: R. Peter Straus; Ellen Sulzberger Straus
- Relatives: Straus family

Diane Straus (October 23, 1951 – December 20, 2017) was an American magazine publisher and platform tennis player. She was the publisher of The American Prospect and Washington Monthly. She was an inductee of the Platform Tennis Hall of Fame.

== Early life ==
Straus was born on October 23, 1951, in Manhattan, New York City. Her father, R. Peter Straus, was the owner of radio station; he later remarried Monica Lewinsky's mother, making Lewinsky Diane's stepsister. Her mother, Ellen Sulzberger Straus, was The New York Times publisher Arthur Ochs Sulzberger's cousin, making him Straus's great-cousin. Her paternal great-grandfather, Nathan Straus, was the owner of Macy's.

Straus graduated from Yale University in 1973.

== Career ==
Straus was the publisher of The American Prospect. She was also the group publisher of Manhattan Media, the publisher of The Westchester and Fairfield County Times, The Westchester Wag, Trader Publications, and The Cranford Citizen and Chronicle. From 2008 to 2017, she was the publisher of Washington Monthly. She served on the editorial board of The Crisis, the official magazine of the NAACP, and Yale Alumni Magazine.

Straus was an avid Platform Tennis player, winning "29 National Championships with 12 different partners, including six Women's titles and two Mixed titles." She was inducted into the Platform Tennis Hall of Fame at the Platform Tennis Museum and Hall of Fame in Scarsdale, New York, in 2004.

Straus worked on Howard Dean's 2004 presidential campaign.

== Personal life and death ==
Straus married Carll Tucker, who founded The Daily Voice. They had two sons, Peter and David, and a daughter, Rebecca. They later divorced.

Straus died of cancer on December 20, 2017, in Washington, D.C., at age 66.
