= Richard Tofel =

American journalist and executive

Richard Tofel is the principal of Gallatin Advisory, a journalism consultancy, and former president of ProPublica, a nonprofit investigative journalism organization.

He was the general manager of ProPublica from its founding in 2007 until 2012, and served as president from 2013 to 2021, succeeded by Robin Sparkman. Previously, he was the president and chief operating officer of the International Freedom Center. Tofel took that position in 2004.

Tofel served as a vice president of Dow Jones & Company from 1997 until joining the International Freedom Center, and as the assistant publisher of The Wall Street Journal beginning in 2002. In the latter capacity, the Journal's international editions reported to him. He was also a director on the joint venture boards of SmartMoney and Vedomosti, the leading Russian business newspaper. He played leading roles in the development of the forthcoming Wall Street Journal Weekend Edition, in the redesign of the Journal and the creation of the Personal Journal section in 2002, and in Dow Jones's response to the events of September 11, 2001.

Tofel's earlier roles at Dow Jones included assistant general counsel (1989–1992), assistant managing editor of the Journal (1992–1995), director of international administration and development (1995–1997) vice president of corporate communications (1997–2000), and assistant to the publisher of the Journal (2000–2002). Before joining Dow Jones, Tofel was an associate at the New York law firm of Patterson Belknap Webb & Tyler from 1983 to 1986. He moved to the New York office of Gibson, Dunn, & Crutcher in 1986.

A native New Yorker, Tofel's previous public service includes stints during the administration of New York City Mayor Edward Koch as executive director of the Beattie Commission on reorganizing the Human Resources Administration and as a member of the Liman Commission investigating the Office of the Chief Medical Examiner.

Tofel earned a bachelor's degree, a law degree, and a master's degree in public policy from Harvard University. He is the author of three books: A Legend in the Making: The New York Yankees in 1939 (2002), Vanishing Point: The Disappearance of Judge Crater, and the New York He Left Behind (2004), and Sounding the Trumpet: The Making of John F. Kennedy's Inaugural Address (2005). He is a member of the board of trustees of Wildcat Service Corp., the advisory board of the Knight-Bagehot Fellowship Program in Economics and Business Journalism at the Columbia University Graduate School of Journalism, and the Joan Shorenstein Center on the Press, Politics and Public Policy at Harvard's John F. Kennedy School of Government.

Tofel has two children with Jeanne Straus, daughter of Ellen Sulzberger Straus and R. Peter Straus, whom he married in 1982. The marriage ended in divorce. On December 12, 2010, he married Janice Nittoli.
