= Holgate House =

Listed building in York, England

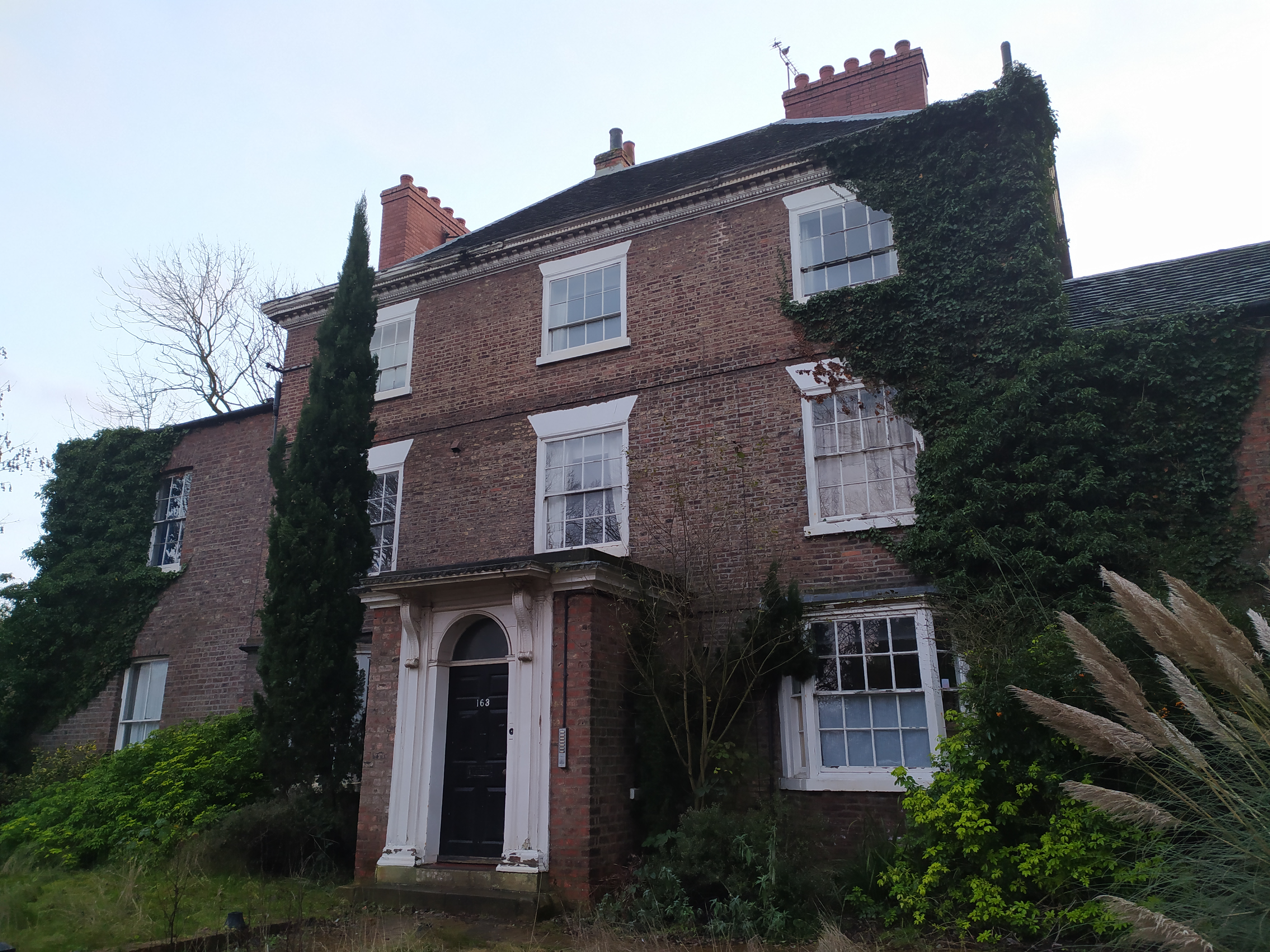
- The building in 2022
- Interactive map of the Holgate House area
- Former names: Collingwood Hotel

General information
- Status: Converted into flats
- Type: House (original; later hotel)
- Location: 163 Holgate Road, Holgate, York, England
- Coordinates: 53°57′18″N 1°06′22″W
- Completed: c. 1775
- Renovated: Early and late 19th century (altered)

Technical details
- Floor count: 3

Design and construction
- Designations

Listed Building – Grade II*
- Official name: Collingwood Hotel
- Designated: 24 June 1983
- Reference no.: 1257537

Holgate House (officially listed as Collingwood Hotel) is a historic building on Holgate Road in the Holgate area of York, England.

Its site was purchased by Edward Matterson in 1770, and he completed the house in 1774, probably as a speculative development. The property had several owners before, in 1786, it was purchased by William Tuke on behalf of Lindley Murray, who lived there until his death in 1826. From 1859, it was occupied by James Backhouse. In the 20th century, it was purchased by British Rail, and served as the headquarters of the British Transport Police. It was Grade II* listed in 1983. In about 1997, it became the Collingwood Hotel, but it was converted into flats around the year 2000.

The three-storey house is built of brick. The original part of the house is three bays wide, and there are two-storey wings either side of the main block. These are early 19th-century, although the one to the north may be a rebuilding of an earlier annexe. To the right of the north wing is a narrow late-19th-century extension. West of the house is a former stable, now with two storeys. When built, it had a summer house in the garden, but this was later moved to The Mount School.

The door surround is original, as its the staircase, and two first floor fireplaces. The windows are also old, and those on the ground floor are bay windows. Most other fixtures date from the early 19th century.

== See also ==
- Grade II* listed buildings in the City of York
- Listed buildings in York (outside the city walls, southern part)
