= 1933 New York City aldermanic presidential election =

- November 7, 1933

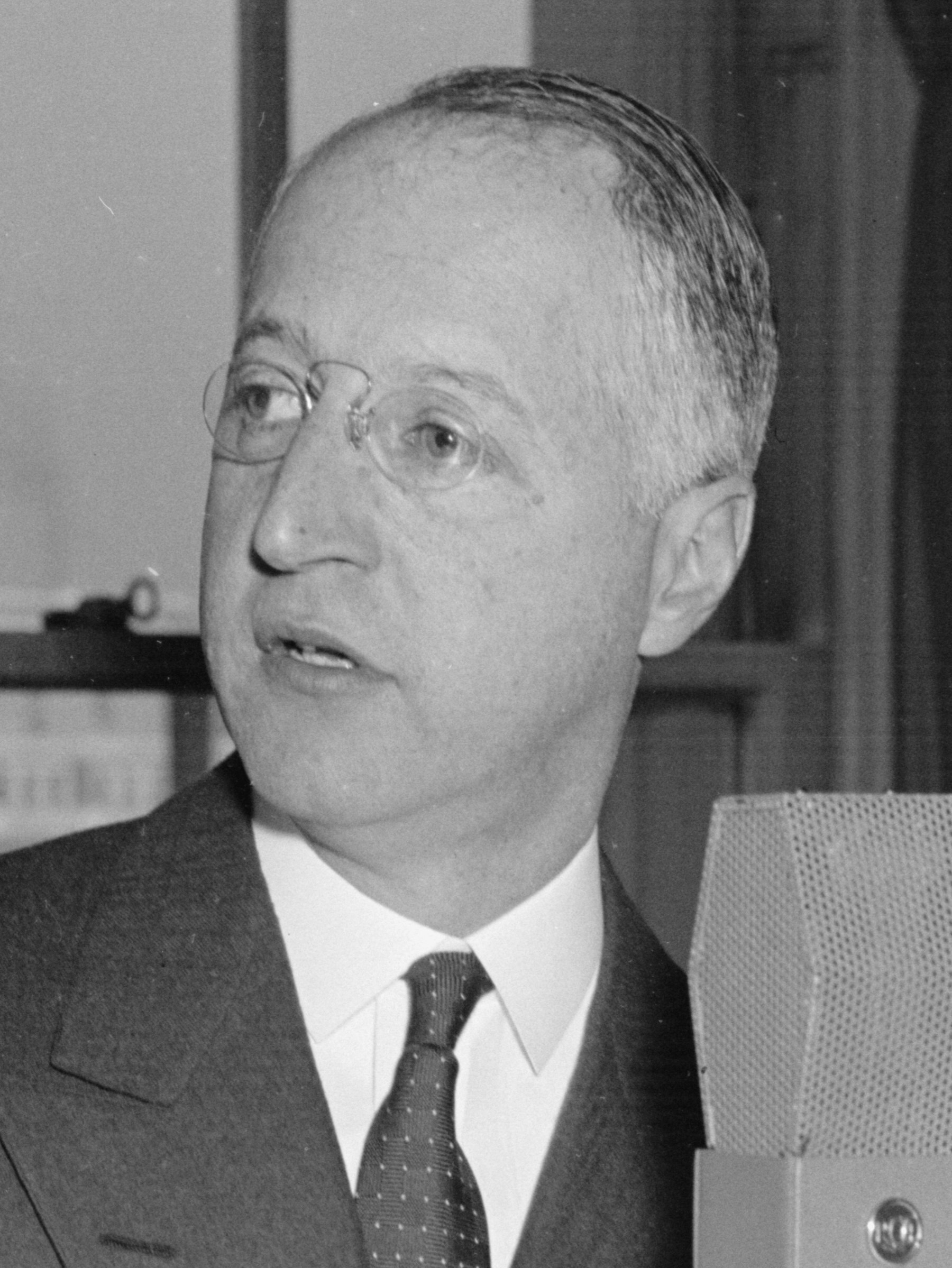
Nominee	Bernard S. Deutsch	Milton Solomon	Nathan Straus Jr.
Party	Republican	Democratic	Recovery
Alliance	City Fusion; Law Preservation	Jeffersonian
Popular vote	824,025	591,814	557,485
Percentage	41.76%	29.99%	28.25%
President of the Board of Aldermen before election
Dennis J. Mahon (acting)
Democratic
Elected President of the Board of Aldermen
Bernard S. Deutsch
Republican

An election was held on November 7, 1933, to elect the President of the New York City Board of Aldermen, along with other contests such as the mayoralty, Comptroller, and aldermen. Democratic incumbent Joseph V. McKee had resigned earlier in the year to assume the office of Mayor after Jimmy Walker had resigned that position, and the aldermanic presidential post was occupied by Dennis J. Mahon in the meantime. Republican candidate Bernard S. Deutsch defeated Democratic candidate Milton Solomon and Recovery Party candidate Natan Straus Jr. to win the position.

== General election ==
=== Candidates ===
- Bernard S. Deutsch (Republican, City Fusion and Law Preservation)
- Milton Solomon (Democratic and Jeffersonian)
- Nathan Straus Jr., journalist and former State Senator (Recovery)
