= Straus Houses =

Public housing development in Manhattan, New York

- NYCHA Property
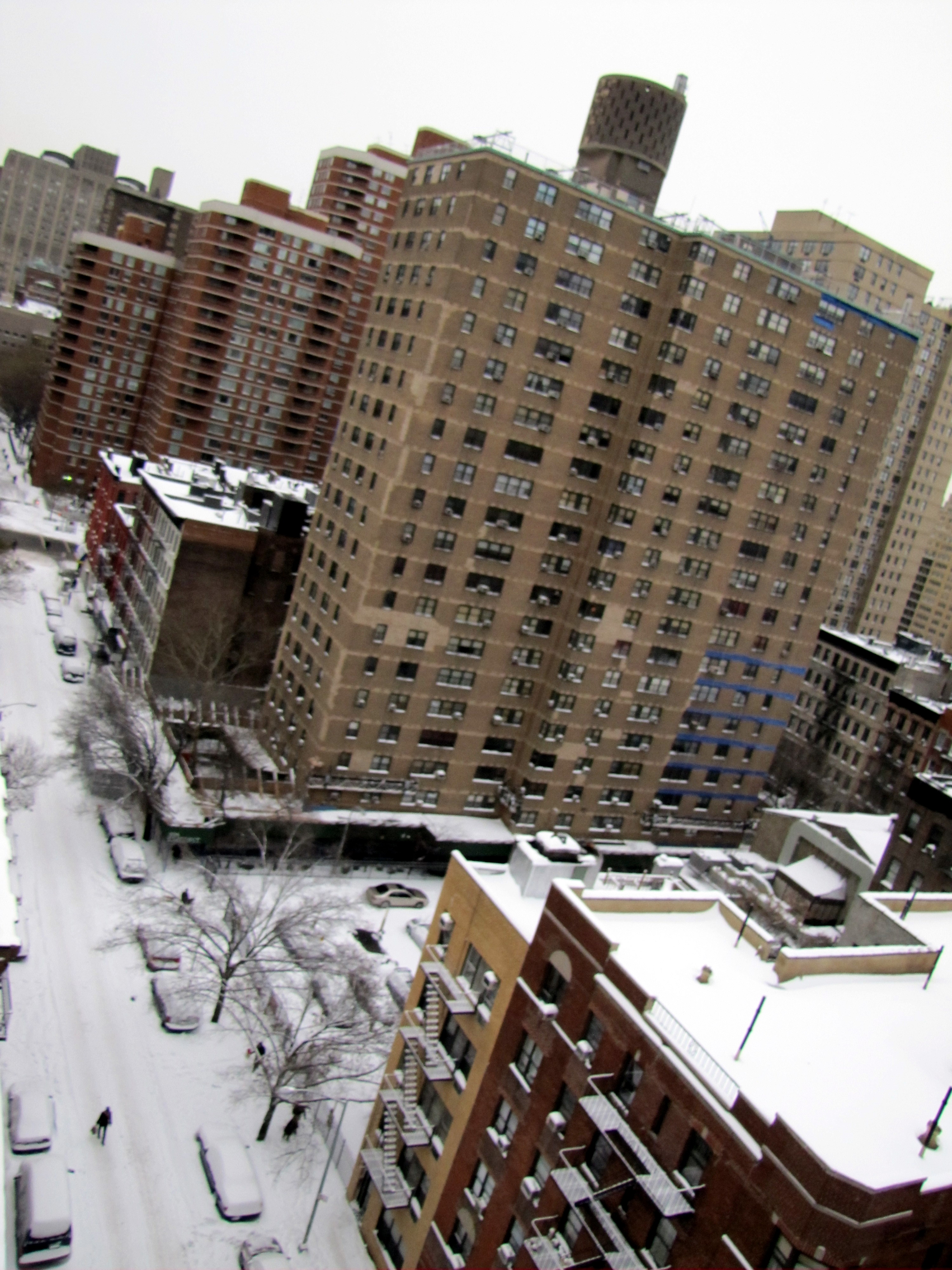
- View of Straus Houses looking east from 28th Street
- Interactive map of Straus Houses
- Country: United States
- State: New York
- City: New York City
- Borough: Manhattan

Area
  - Total: 1.08 acres (0.44 ha)

Population
  - Total: 503
- Zip Code: 10016

The Straus Houses is a NYCHA housing complex with two buildings; Building I has 20 stories and Building II has 19 stories. It is located between East 27th and 28th Streets and also between 2nd and 3rd Avenues in the Kips Bay neighborhood of Manhattan in New York City. The housing complex was named after Nathan Straus.

== History ==
A dedication ceremony for the project was held on April 30, 1963 and attended by Mayor Robert Wagner. The housing complex was designed by architects Gustave W. Iser and Walter G. Leicht. The western portion of the site was formerly occupied by Public School 14 and is located adjacent to St. Illuminator's Armenian Apostolic Cathedral.

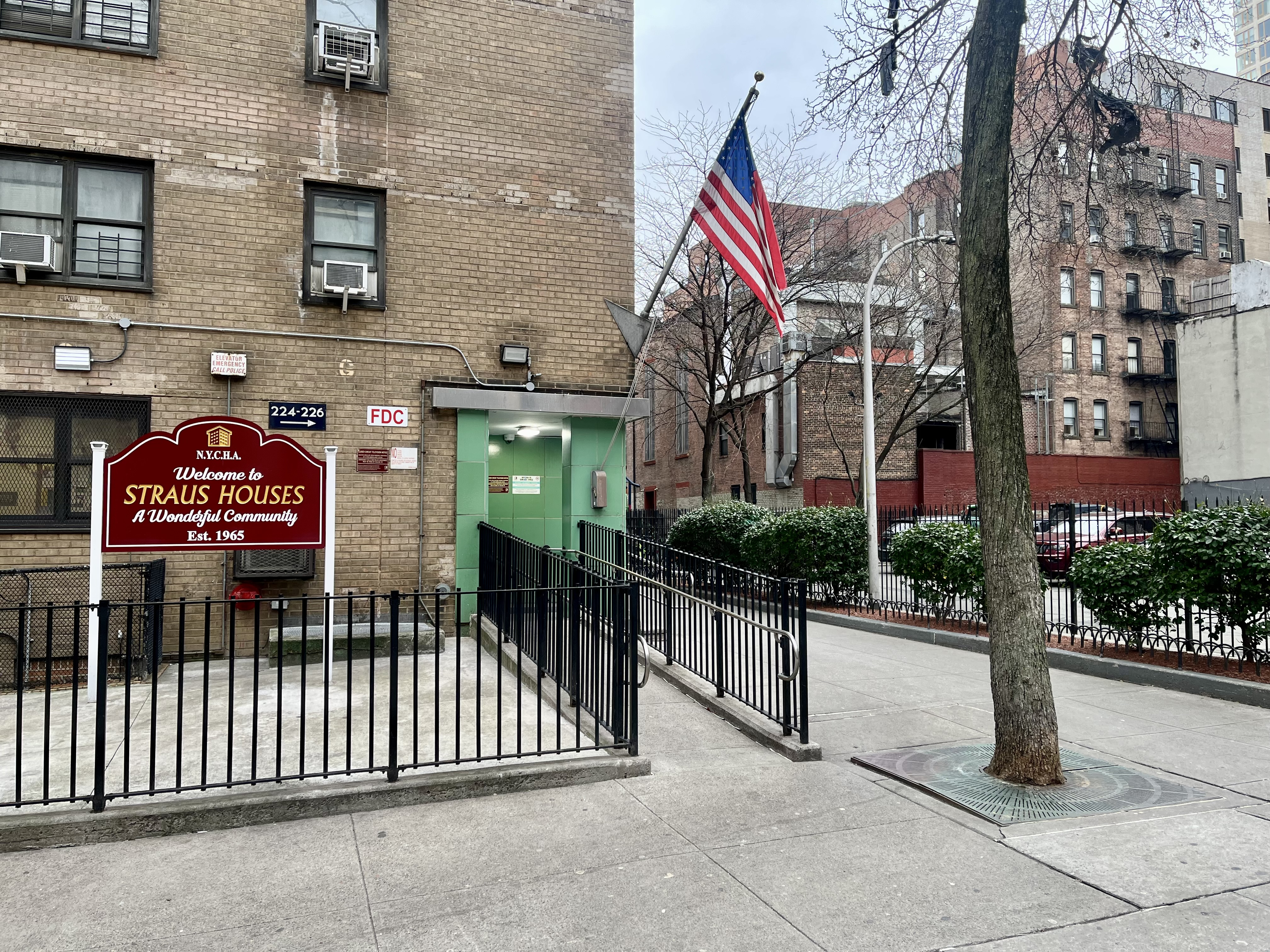
28th Street entrance to the Straus Houses, showing the pedestrian way running along the west side of the building

Units at the complex were reserved for families displaced from the Bellevue South Urban Renewal Area, which was located across from the site between 1st and 2nd Avenues from East 23rd and 30th Streets. Parents at Public School 116 on East 33rd Street were concerned with the loss of diversity of the student body at due to the urban renewal project and the school's P.T.A. assisted affected families in filling out applications for apartments in the Straus Houses. The housing complex was completed in January 1965.

The housing complex contained front and side yards that were designed to function as play space for children and social space for adults and also included a side yard that was converted into a pedestrian way. The plaza included a play sculpture dedicated to Nathan Straus, which was designed by David Aaron. The outdoor space was designed by the architectural firms of Pomerance & Breines and M. Paul Friedberg Associates; these same two firms later designed the open space at the Riis Houses. Named "Nathan Straus Memorial Plaza", the project won an Honor Award from the American Society of Landscape Architects in June 1965.

== See also ==
- New York City Housing Authority
