= Mary Murray (ferry) =

Retired Staten Island Ferry vessel

Coordinates: 40°29′3.33″N 74°23′33.09″W

The Mary Murray was a 277-foot (84 m) long Staten Island Ferry vessel launched in 1937. She was decommissioned in 1975, and sold at auction with her new owner intending to turn it into a restaurant or museum. She sat tied up at a creek on the Raritan River within view of the New Jersey Turnpike until she was dismantled for scrap in 2008–2012.

== History ==
The Mary Murray was named for the American Revolutionary War figure Mary Lindley Murray. The vessel was built and launched from the United Dry Docks on Staten Island in 1937 during a grand ceremony with Mayor Fiorello La Guardia and 500 other spectators in attendance. The 277-foot-long (84 m) ship, part of the Miss New York ferryboat class, cost $912,000 to build.

The Mary Murray was retired in 1974 and sold at auction. From 1982 through the mid-2000s, she sat as a floating wreck on the Raritan River within view of the New Jersey Turnpike. Her owner was George Searle, a former merchant mariner, who had intentions of turning it into a restaurant or museum. Shortly after purchasing the Mary Murray, Searle had the vessel towed to a spot near his marina on the south side of the Raritan River. The state sued Searle in 1981 because the boat was docked in the middle of the river. In 1982 he moved the vessel to his property on the side of the river, tying her to the bank partially up "No-Name Creek", where she stayed until she was dismantled. The location contained other vessels and barges purchased by Searle including a ship purported to be owned by a former Shah of Iran.

Historically, prefixes for civilian vessels often identified the vessel's mode of propulsion, such as, "SS" (screw steamer), "MV" (motor vessel).

The Mary Murray was powered by a 4,000 horsepower double compound steam engine.

== Dismantling ==
In March 2008 it was announced that the ferry would be dismantled and used for scrap metal. Aerial images show the ferry's superstructure half removed by October 2008, dismantled all the way down to the hull in by 2010, and ferry as well as all the other barge and boat hulls totally gone by 2012.
