= Nathan Straus Jr. =

American politician

Nathan Straus
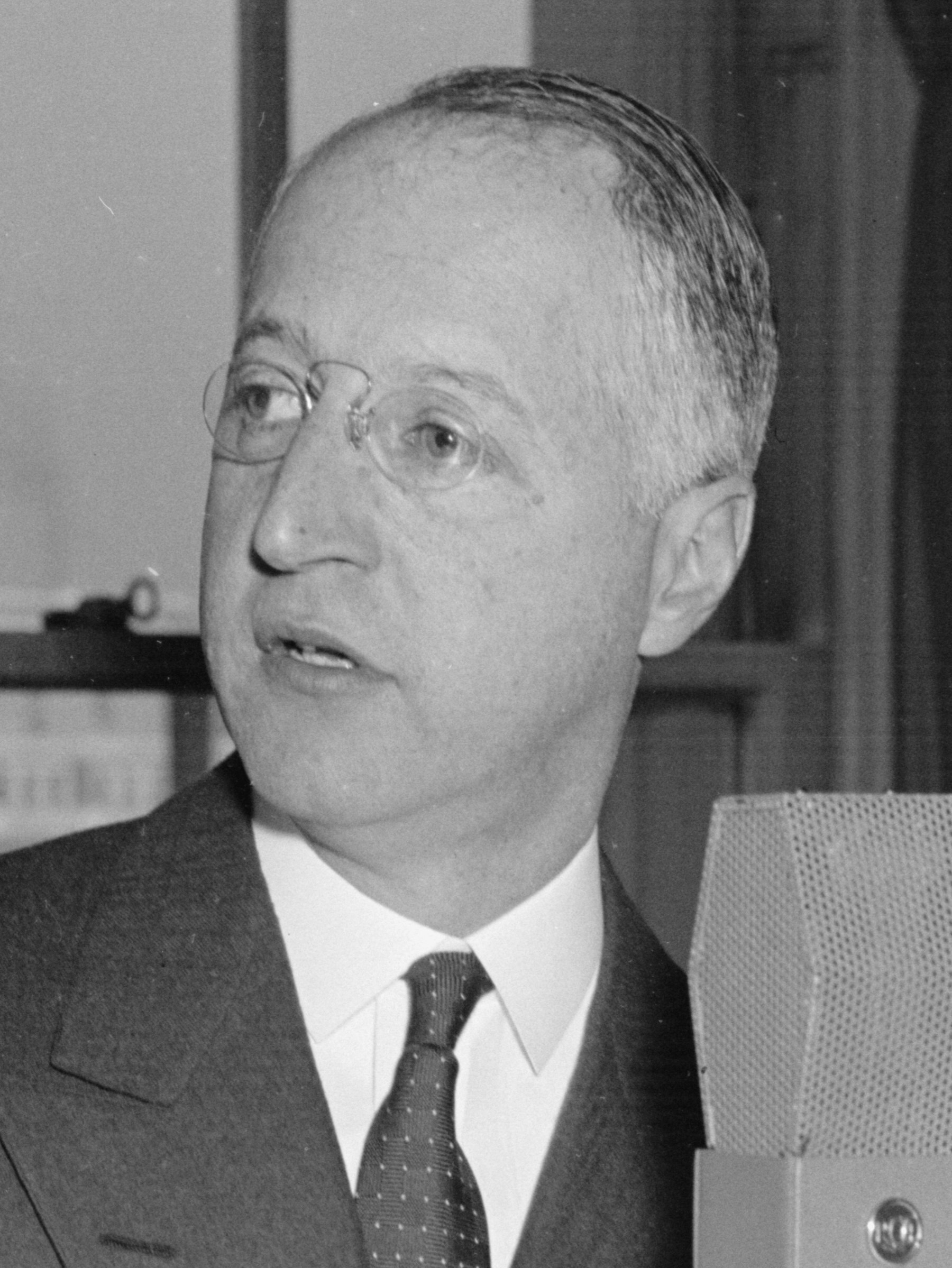
- Straus in 1937

Director of the United States Housing Authority
- In office September 1, 1937 – February 16, 1942
- President: Franklin D. Roosevelt
- Preceded by: Position established
- Succeeded by: Herbert Emmerich (Federal Public Housing Authority); John Blandford Jr. (National Housing Agency)

Member of the New York Senate from the 15th district
- In office January 1, 1921 – December 31, 1926
- Preceded by: Abraham Kaplan
- Succeeded by: John L. Buckley

Personal details
- Born: Charles Webster Straus; May 27, 1889 New York City, New York, U.S.
- Died: September 13, 1961 (aged 72) Massapequa, New York, U.S.
- Party: Democratic
- Other political affiliations: Recovery (1933)
- Spouse: Helen Sachs (m. 1915)
- Children: 4, including R. Peter Straus
- Parent: Nathan Straus (father)
- Relatives: Straus family Bernard Sachs (father-in-law)
- Education: Princeton University (BA); Heidelberg University (attended)

Military service
- Allegiance: United States
- Branch/service: United States Navy
- Years of service: 1917–1918
- Rank: Ensign
- Battles/wars: World War I

Nathan Straus Jr. (born Charles Webster "Charley" Straus on May 27, 1889 – September 13, 1961) was an American journalist and politician who served as a member of the New York State Senate from 1921 to 1926, then later as director of the United States Housing Authority from 1937 to 1942.

== Early life ==
Nathan Straus Jr. was the son of Lina (née Gutherz) and Nathan Straus (1848–1931), co-owner of Macy's department store. Both were of German-Jewish origins. He attended Princeton University and Heidelberg University where he made friends with a student his age, Otto Frank and invited him to work at Macy's. He worked as a reporter for The New York Globe from 1909 to 1910 and was editor and publisher of Puck magazine from 1913 to 1917. During World War I he served as an ensign in the United States Navy.

== Political career ==
=== State Assembly ===
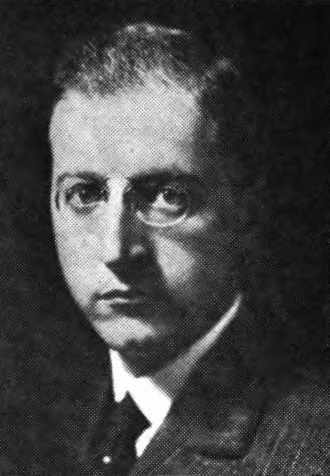
Straus's official State Senate portrait, 1921

After the war, Straus became Assistant Editor of the New York Globe, but left in 1920 because of the paper's support for Republican presidential candidate Warren G. Harding. Instead, he entered politics as a Democrat, and was a member of the New York State Senate from 1921 to 1926, sitting in the 144th, 145th, 146th, 147th, 148th, and 149th New York State Legislatures. He chaired the Committee on Agriculture from 1923 to 1924. During his three terms, he introduced legislation for mandatory automobile insurance, female-inclusive juries, and ratification of the Child Labor Amendment. His staunch political progressivism led Time magazine to label him an "almost Socialistic" Democrat.

Although he had ambitions of becoming Senate majority leader, the widespread public antisemitism of the 1920s and the selection of fellow Jew Maurice Bloch as Democratic leader in the State Assembly made Straus feel as though a Jew leading both bodies would not be possible. Seeing his Senate career as a dead-end, he chose not to run for re-election in 1926, although he remained politically active.

=== New York City politics ===
In the leadup to the 1933 New York City mayoral election, Straus was approached by the City Fusion Party to run for mayor against incumbent Tammany Democrat John P. O'Brien. Despite the fact that his ambition "had always been to be Mayor of New York," Straus was once again fearful of inciting antisemitism, this time because another Jew, Herbert H. Lehman, was already governor of New York. In what he described as "one of the most difficult decisions of my life," Straus declined the mayoral nomination, which ultimately went to Republican Fiorello La Guardia.

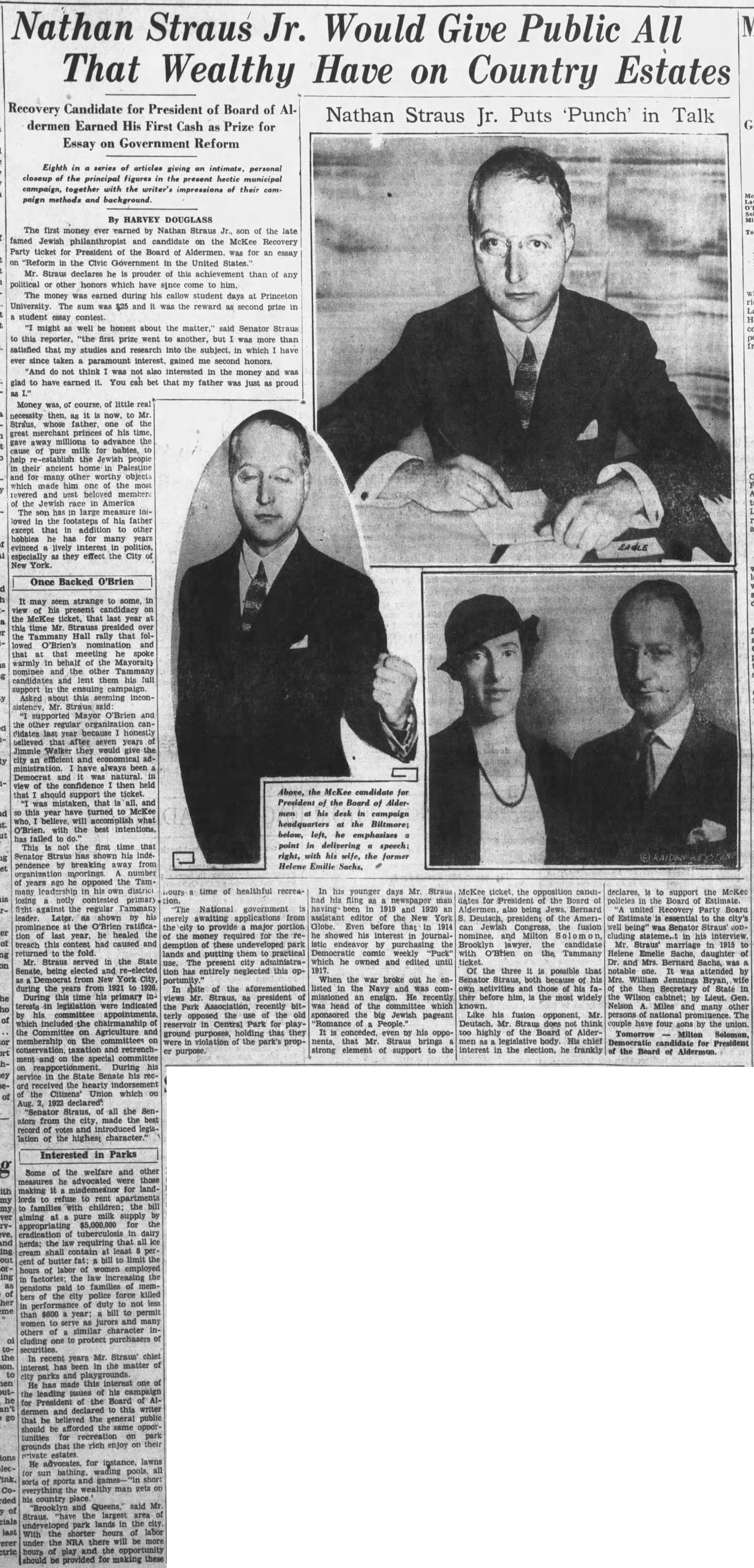
Article in The Brooklyn Eagle detailing Straus's campaign for president of the Board of Aldermen, published October 23, 1933

Opposed to O'Brien but unwilling to join the Republicans, Straus chose to back former mayor Joseph V. McKee, a former Democrat running as the Recovery Party candidate. In turn, Straus was named the Recovery candidate for president of the Board of Aldermen. During the election campaign, McKee was dogged by allegations of antisemitism stemming from a 1915 essay titled "A Serious Question," which questioned the moral and political reliability of young Jewish people in New York City. Although McKee insisted his words had been taken out of context (and several prominent Jewish supporters, including Straus, came to his defense), the damage from the controversy had been done and the entire Recovery ticket was defeated.

=== Later career ===
After his loss in the aldermanic presidential election, Straus was New York State Administrator of the National Recovery Administration in 1934; a member of the New York City Housing Authority (NYCHA) in 1936; and Administrator of the United States Housing Authority from 1937 to 1942. He published two books on housing issues: Seven Myths of Housing (1944), and Two-Thirds of a Nation – A Housing Program (1952).

== Later life and death ==
Outside of politics, Straus was a founding trustee of the Palestine Endowment Fund, Inc. in 1922 along with Julian Mack and Stephen Samuel Wise. He was also chairman of the WMCA radio station from 1943 until his death.

On September 13, 1961, Straus was found dead in a motel room in Massapequa, New York. According to his family, he suffered from a heart condition, and it was determined that he died of natural causes. He was buried at the Mount Pleasant Cemetery in Hawthorne, New York. The Straus Houses, a NYCHA housing development in Manhattan, were named after him in December 1961.

== Personal life ==
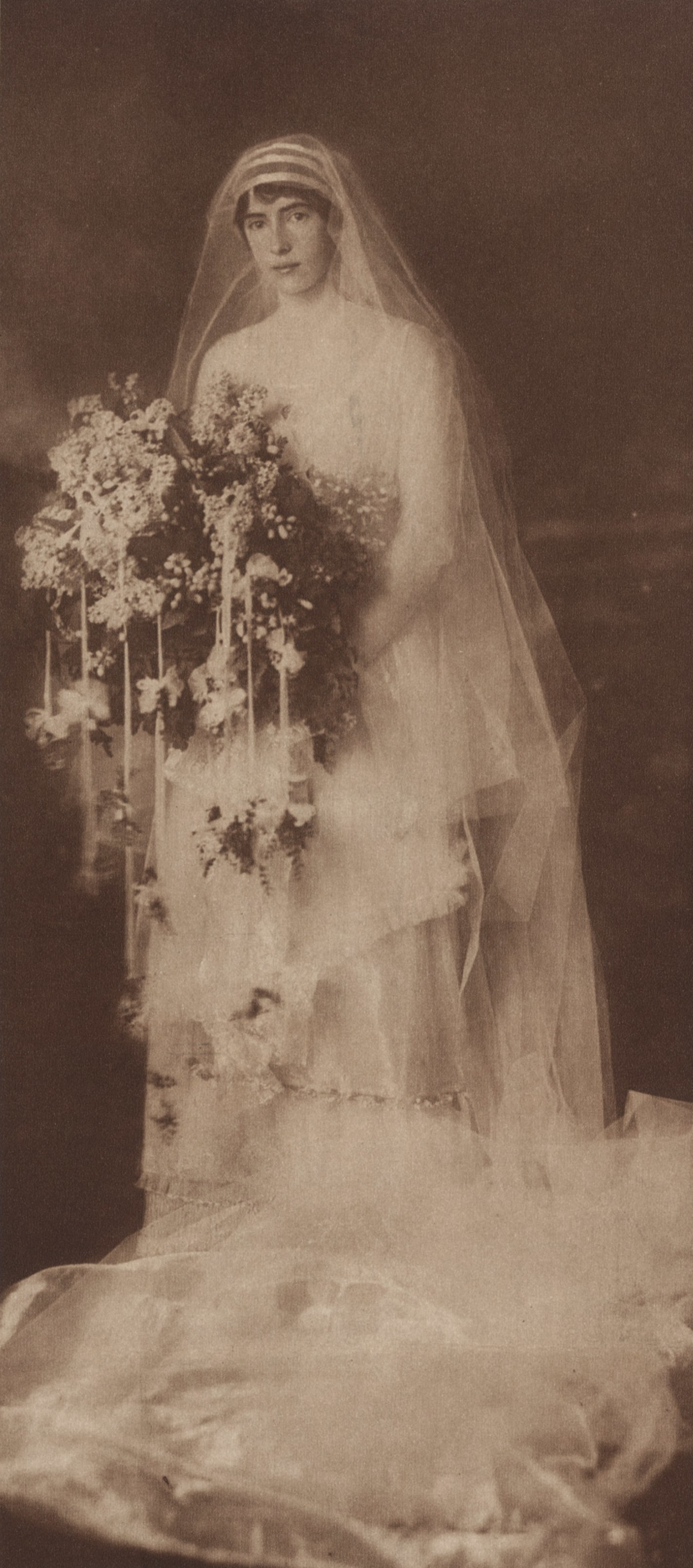
Straus's wife Helen in her wedding dress, 1915

He was married to Helen Sachs, daughter of Bernard Sachs, a neurologist for whom Tay–Sachs disease is named and member of the Goldman-Sachs family. They had four sons: Nathan Straus III, Barnard Sachs Straus (married to Joan Paley), Irving Lehman Straus, and R. Peter Straus. R. Peter Straus was director of the Voice of America under President Jimmy Carter and owned radio station WMCA in New York City. In 1998, he married Marcia Lewis, the mother of Monica Lewinsky.

Congressman Isidor Straus and US Secretary of Commerce and Labor Oscar Straus were Nathan's uncles; New York Chief Judge Irving Lehman was his brother-in-law; and Ambassador Jesse I. Straus was his first cousin.

=== Anne Frank connection ===
When Straus attended Heidelberg University in 1908, he met a young art-history scholar named Otto Frank, who was the same age as him. The 20-year-old Frank accepted a job at Macy's, where he fell in love with New York and its brashness, but he returned to Germany after his father's death in 1909.

Frank, who was Jewish, later fled Germany with his family in the face of the severe antisemitism of Nazi Germany. They relocated to Amsterdam, where Frank enlisted Nathan Jr.'s assistance to help his family obtain visas to move to the United States. Despite receiving help from Nathan Jr. and other connections, the Franks were unable to gather all the needed paperwork before Nazi Germany ordered US consulates to close in German-occupied territory (including the Netherlands). Ultimately, the entire Frank family was interned in Nazi concentration camps, with Otto the only member to survive the war.

In the years that followed, Otto published the diary of his daughter, Anne Frank, which described the family's life in hiding from the Nazis in Amsterdam. That work, known in English as The Diary of a Young Girl or The Diary of Anne Frank, is one of the best-known books about the Holocaust. It has been translated into dozens of languages and adapted into plays and films.

Political offices
New office	Director of the United States Housing Authority; 1937–1942	Succeeded by Herbert Emmerich as Administrator of the Federal Public Housing Authority
New office	Director of the United States Housing Authority; 1937–1942	Succeeded by John Blandford Jr. as Administrator of the National Housing Agency
