= World Federation of Neurology =

Association of national neurological societies

- Formation: July 1957
- Type: Non-profit Organization (NPO)
- Headquarters: Bedford House, Fulham Green, 69-79 Fulham High Street, London, SW6 3JA, United Kingdom
- Members: 126 National Neurological Member Societies
- President: Prof. Steven Lewis
- Website: wfneurology.org

World Federation of Neurology (WFN) was formed in Brussels, Belgium, in 1957, as an association of national neurological societies. It is a UK registered charity with a mission to foster quality neurology and brain health worldwide through promoting global neurological education and training, with the emphasis on under-resourced parts of the world.

== History ==
WFN was founded during the Sixth World Congress of Neurosciences, and at the First International Congress of Neurological Sciences, held in Brussels in July, 1957.

The original idea of the WFN arose during a dinner in Antwerp in 1955. Ludo van Bogaert (Belgium, 1897–1989), Armand Lowenthal (The Netherlands, 1919–2001) and Charles Poser (Belgium, 1923–2010) discussed the formation of a club consisting mainly of neuropathologists (named were Erna Christensen, Aagot Christie Löken, Willibald Scholz, Julius Hallervorden, Hugo Spatz, Georges Schaltenbrand, Ivan Bertrand, Jean-Emmanuel Grüner) and some neurologists (MacDonald Critchley, Raymond Garcin, Georg Herman Monrad-Krohn). The purpose was primarily to collect reprints and unpublished doctoral theses in a central location (e.g. the Institute Bunge). As the discussion progressed, they thought that the group should be expanded and that other specialists should also form such "clubs".

After many talks, invitations were sent for a founding meeting to take place on 22 and 26 July 1957. A draft WFN constitution was prepared by Ludo van Bogaert, Houston Merritt, MacDonald Critchley, Auguste Tournay, Georg Schaltenbrand and Pearce Bailey, with Charles Poser as Secretary.

The meetings were attended by 38 national delegates representing 29 national societies from Europe, Latin American (Argentina, Brazil, Chile, Cuba, Peru, Uruguay), USA, Africa (South Africa) and Asia (Iran and India):

- Roman Arana-Iniguez (Uruguay)
- Alfonso Asenjo (Chile)
- Pearce Bailey (USA)
- Juan José Barcia Goyanes (Spain)
- G. Belloni (Italy)
- Sam Berman (South Africa)
- S. Bojinov (Bulgaria)
- C. Castell-Diaz (Uruguay)
- Deolindo Couto (Brazil)
- Macdonald Critchley (UK)
- C. de Rojas (Cuba)
- J. Espadaler-Medina (Spain)
- R. Frauchiger (Switzerland)
- Nikolai Graschenkov (USSR)
- Leo Halpern (Israel)
- Kamil Henner (Czechoslovakia)
- E. Herman (Poland)
- Knud Krabbe (Denmark)
- S. Kornyev (Hungary)
- A. Kreindler (Romania)
- Erik Kugelberg (Sweden)
- J. Lopez-Ibor (Spain)
- Houston Merritt (USA)
- Georg H. Monrad-Krohn (Norway)
- S. Nachev (Bulgaria)
- J. Pereyra-Kafer (Argentina)
- B. Ramamurthi (India)
- Sigvald Refsum (Norway)
- Georg Schaltenbrand (W. Germany)
- M. Sercl (Czechoslovakia)
- C. Sillevis-Smitt (the Netherlands)
- Ihsan Sükrü Aksel (Turkey)
- E. Tchehrazi (Iran)
- Auguste Tournay (France)
- Oscar Montes Trelles (Peru)
- Knud Winther (Denmark)
- Gunnar Wohlfart (Sweden)
- N. Zec (Yugoslavia)

Ludo van Bogaert was unanimously elected President of the new organisation. Pearce Bailey became Secretary-Treasurer General. There were four Vice-Presidents: Houston Merritt, Raymond Garcin, Kamil Henner and Shigeo Okinaka.

An informal WFN Policy Committee was formed to consider the future policy of the new organisation. It consisted of WFN members from different countries. Among them were Macdonald Critchley, Eddie P. Bharucha (Bombay, India), Russell N. DeJong (Ann Arbor, USA), Georg Schaltenbrand (West Germany), Francois Thiébaut (Strasbourg, France), Oscar Montes Trelles (Lima, Peru), and Semen Aleksandrovich Sarkisov (Moscow, USSR). Because the term policy had different meanings in different countries, the Policy Committee was re-named the Steering Committee in 1969.

=== WFN Presidents ===
According to the constitution and bye-laws, the president and the secretary-treasurer general should each serve for four years. Re-election is not allowed.

2026-2029	Steven Lewis (USA)
2022–2025	Wolfgang Grisold (Austria)
2018–2021	William M Carroll (Australia)
2014–2017	Raad Shakir (UK)
2010–2013	Vladimir Hachinski (Canada)
2006–2009	Johan Aarli (Norway)
2002–2005	Jun Kimura (Japan/USA)
1998–2001	James Toole (USA)
1990–1997	John Walton (UK)
1982–1989	Richard Masland (USA)
1974–1981	Sigvald Refsum (Norway)
1966–1973	MacDonald Critchley (UK)
1957–1965	Ludo van Bogaert (Belgium)

== World Brain Day ==
The concept of World Brain Day was born over a corridor conversation between Tissa Wijeratne, Mohommad Wasay and Vladimir Hachinski in 2010. It was formerly endorsed at the next Council of Delegates meeting with unanimous voting. WFN birthday, 22 July was selected as the Day of Brain, World Brain Day. Tissa Wijeratne and David W. Dodick, Co-Chair of the World Brain 2023-2026.

== WFN Speciality Groups ==
Van Bogaert and the leadership of the WFN realised the importance of creating groups of international leaders in various fields of neurology. These groups were called Problem Commissions.

During the first years of its existence, the WFN economy of the WFN had been based upon generous support from the NINDB, a part of the U.S. National Institutes of Health (NIH). From 1965, it was clear that no further funding for WFN activities would come from the US Government sources.

At a meeting of the WFN Executive Committee (later re-named the Council of Delegates), past and present officers of the WFN with Chairmen and Secretaries of the Problem Commissions met in Geneva in July 1966. The Problem Commissions were re-named "Research Groups" and organised in the new Research Committee. The Secretaries of these Research Groups would now form the Research Committee.

The hope was that each Research Group should bring money to the organisation. A few did, but many Research Groups were unable to support WFN financially. John Walton's idea was that some Problem Commissions – now Research Groups – might develop into international societies that could become corporate members of the Research Committee with the payment of an annual subscription that might improve the economy of the organisation. This proved to be a great step forward. But it took several years until it worked. In the meantime, the economic situation remained critical.

By 1969, the income of the Research Committee was only sufficient to support the secretarial and administrative expenses of the Committee. No grants were available to the Research Groups to support their activities.

By 2010 the groups were known as "Applied Research Groups" and in 2019 renamed to Specialty Groups.

== World Neurology ==
=== World Neurology Journal ===
WFN was not in a position to sponsor meetings of the Problem Commissions, who usually met during international congresses. In order to communicate with neurologists worldwide, an international journal was needed. The Problem Commissions published reports from their meetings in World Neurology, later in the Journal of Neurological Sciences. This formed a backbone of an international network of neurologists.

Charles Poser had suggested to Ludo van Bogaert in March 1959 that WFN needed its own journal, both as a newsletter, for publication of research news, but also as a forum for the Problem Commissions, announcements of their meetings and reports from national and international meetings in neurology. Poser became the Editor-in-Chief, with van Bogaert and Pearce Bailey as Associate Editors. The first issue of World Neurology was published in July 1960.

The new journal had an ambitious program. As the Editor-in-Chief wrote in his first editorial:

Right from the beginning we are emphasising the international and multilingual nature of this publication as well as the variety of the aspects of neurology which we hope to cover. ... World Neurology… requests review papers on current concepts and recent advances in their field of endeavour from authorities in clinical and basic neurology and the allied disciplines. These are then translated into English, French, German, or Spanish, in each case, a language different from the one most often used by the author. An article in any language is followed by comprehensive abstracts in the other three.

Seen in retrospect, publishing articles in four different languages was too ambitious and time-consuming. The Editor-in-Chief realised that standards for reviewing manuscripts varied considerably over the world. The traditions of the referee systems varied. There were considerable differences in traditions for the presentation of data, and spelling, usage, style and grammar varied. The number of subscriptions was very slow to increase. Conflicts appeared. Charles Poser was replaced with Gilbert Glaser as Editor-in-Chief in September 1961 and World Neurology stopped publication in December 1962. It later reappeared in a different form as the WFN newsletter, while a new international Journal of the Neurological Sciences was founded in 1964.

=== World Neurology Newsletter ===
Until Richard Masland's Presidency, the WFN newsletter was found in the Journal of the Neurological Sciences. Masland realised the importance of a separate newsletter with information of the development of the WFN, news from the Research Groups and communication about activities in the neurosciences worldwide. The first Newsletter of the World Federation of Neurology appeared as Highlights of the Meeting of the Council of Delegates and Research Committee WFN Hamburg, November 15, 1983. It contained information not only about the coming World Congress, but it also gave information about the WFN Research Groups and the development of the organisation. It then appeared in June 1984 (second announcement), November 1984 (third announcement) and as the Pre-Congress issue 15 July 1985.

The cost of the four issues, which were circulated to over 18,000 neurologists was underwritten by the Congress Management and the German Organising Committee. Several pharmaceutical companies, Eisai, Hoechst Marion Roussel, Schering Healthcare, Lilly, and Smith Kline Beecham, gave substantial grants to help with the costs of publishing World Neurology in its new format, first with Eldred Smith-Gordon and subsequently with Cambridge Medical Publications.

In January 2013, World Neurology ceased printing in hard-copy and made available only as a new digital edition through Ascend Integrated Media.

== Scientific Journals ==
The WFN scientific journals provides a medium for the publication of original articles in neurology and neuroscience from around the world. The journals places special emphasis on articles that:

1. provide guidance to clinicians around the world (Best Practices, Global Neurology);
2. report cutting-edge science related to neurology (Basic and Translational Sciences);
3. educate readers about relevant and practical clinical outcomes in neurology (Outcomes Research); and
4. summarise or editorialise the current state of the literature (Reviews, Commentaries, and Editorials).

=== Journal of the Neurological Sciences ===
The Journal of the Neurological Sciences (JNS) comprised topics from neurology-related fields that are considered to be of interest to practicing physicians around the world. Examples include neuromuscular diseases, demyelination, atrophies, dementia, neoplasms, infections, epilepsies, disturbances of consciousness, stroke and cerebral circulation, growth and development, plasticity and intermediary metabolism.

The fields covered include:

- neuroanatomy
- neurochemistry
- neuroendocrinology
- neuroepidemiology
- neurogenetics
- neuroimmunology
- neuroophthalmology
- neuropathology
- neuropharmacology
- neurophysiology
- neuropsychology
- neuroradiology
- neurosurgery
- neurooncology
- neurotoxicology
- restorative neurology
- tropical neurology

==== Origins ====
In 1964, Ludo van Bogaert and Armand Lowenthal negotiated a contract with Elsevier for a new journal, Journal of the Neurological Sciences, as the official bulletin of the WFN, with 6 issues a year. Each issue contained information from the WFN with reports from committee meetings. There were also reports from meetings of national and regional neurological societies. The scientific articles had summaries in English, French and German. Most papers were in English, but manuscripts in French or German were also accepted for publication.

In 1964, Nikolai Graschenko (1901–1965) urged that the journal should also accept Russian as an official language. He pointed out that there were 5-6000 neurologists in the USSR. Van Bogaert was positive to having Russian as an official language, but pointed out that the printing costs would be too high because of the Cyrillian alphabet.

Macdonald Critchley was the first Editor-in-Chief. In 1965, he was elected President of the WFN, and John Walton became the editor. The only financial support the editorial office was an annual grant of US$500 from the funds of the WFN, with no contribution from the publisher.

During the first years of its existence, the journal in addition served as a newsletter for the WFN. Reports from Council of Delegates, of Committee meetings and of WFN administrative affairs were published, often occupying several pages, but not always read as thoroughly as hoped. Around 1993, when World Neurology had become the established WFN newsletter and published in more than 20 000 issues, the journal could focus upon its main function, being a scientific journal.

=== eNeurologicalSci (eNS) ===
Launched in March 2015, eNeurologicalSci is the WFN Open Access scientific journal.

== World Congresses ==
Before WFN, there was no world organisation of neurology. The idea of an international neurology meeting was born in 1927, when two neurologists, Bernard Sachs (1858–1944) and Otto Marburg (1874–1948) met to discuss the needs for neurologists to come together to discuss neurosciences and progress in neurology. The following year, Bernard Sachs wrote to key figures in international neurology.

The first international neuroscience meeting took place in Berne, Switzerland, in September 1931. Bernard Sachs was the Congress President, Sir Charles Sherrington (1857–1952) Vice-President and Henry Alsop Riley (1887–1966) the Secretary-General. The Congress, which was a result of a generous initiative by the American Neurological Association, brought together individuals from 42 countries of several continents.

The Berne congress was important because it was the first occasion for neurologists to meet, learn from each other, and exchange views. But the idea of organising a world-wide club of neurological societies was still 25 years forward in time. Before the World War II, a usual journey by sea across the Atlantic took about five days. Scheduled trans-atlantic flights between the US and London/Europe did not begin until after 1947. Progress in communication would be necessary for the future development of international neurology.

The first international congress of neurosciences in which WFN was involved, took place in Rome in September 1961. The six first congresses have since been included in the sequence of World Congresses of Neurology (WCN), although they took place before WFN had been founded.

=== International Congress of Neurosciences ===
1st	1931	Berne, Switzerland	President: Dr Bernard Sachs; Vice President: Sir Charles Sherrington; Secretary-General: Dr Henry Alsop Riley
2nd	1935	London, U.K.	President: Dr (later Sir) Gordon Holmes; Honorary President: Dr Bernard Sachs; Secretary-General: Dr Samuel Alexander Kinnier Wilson
3rd	1939	Copenhagen, Denmark	President: Professor Viggo Christiansen; Honorary President: Dr Bernard Sachs; 2nd Honorary President: Sir Charles Sherrington; 3rd Honorary President: Dr (later Sir) Gordon Holmes); 11 Vice-Presidents (incl. Dr Ludo van Bogaert)
4th	1949	Paris, France	
5th	1953	Lisbon, Portugal	President: Dr António Flores; Secretary-General: Dr Almeida Lima); Honorary Presidents: Sir Gordon Holmes, Dr Georges Charles Guillain, Dr André-Thomas, Dr Théophile Alajouanine, Dr Egas Moniz
6th	1957	Brussels, Belgium	
7th	1961	Rome, Italy	President: Mario Gozzano; Vice President: H. Houston Merritt; Secretary: Giovanni Alema
8th	1965	Vienna, Austria	President: Hans Hoff; Vice-President: Franz Seitelberger; Secretary: Helmuth Tschabitscher
9th	1969	New York, USA	President: H. Houston Merritt; Secretary-General: Melvin D. Yahr. Treasurer: Morris B. Bender
10th	1973	Barcelona, Spain	President: A. Subirana; Vice-President: I. Barraquer Bordas; Secretary: J.M. Espadaler
=== World Congress of Neurology ===
11th	1977	Amsterdam, the Netherlands	President: W.A. den Hartog Jager; Secretary: George Bruyn; Treasurer-General: A.P.J.Heijstee.
12th	1981	Kyoto, Japan	President: S. Katsuki; Secretary-General: Tadao Tsubaki
13th	1985	Hamburg, Germany	President: Klaus Poeck; Vice President: H. Gänshirt.; General Secretary: H-G. Mertens
14th	1989	New Delhi, India	President: Eddie P. Bharucha; Secretary-General: Jagjit Chopra
15th	1993	Vancouver, Canada	President: Henry Barnett; Secretary-General: Donald W. Paty
16th	1997	Buenos Aires, Argentina	President: Salomon Muchnik; Secretary: Leonor Gold; Treasurer: Lorenzo Bauso Toselli; Chairman of the Scientific Programme Committee: Roberto Sicca
17th	2001	London, UK	President: Ian MacDonald; Secretary: Christopher Kennard
18th	2005	Sydney, Australia	President: William Carroll; Secretary-General: Geoffrey Donnan; Chairman of the Scientific Program Committee: Sam Berkovic
19th	2009	Bangkok, Thailand	President: Niphon Poungvarin; Chairman: Kammant Phanthumchinda; Secretary-General: Somsak Laptikultham; Treasurer: Somchai Towanabut
20th	2011	Marrakesh, Morocco	President: Mostafa El Alaoui Faris; 1st Vice-President: Chafiq Hicham; 2nd Vice-President: Mohamed Yahyaoui; Secretary: Maria Benabdeljil
21st	2013	Vienna, Austria	President: Eduard Auff
22nd	2015	Santiago, Chile	President: Renato Verdugo
23rd	2017	Kyoto, Japan	President: Hidehiro Mizusawa
24th	2019	Dubai, UAE	President: Suhail Abdulla Al-Rukn
25th	2021	Rome, Italy	President: Antonio Federico
26th	2023	Montreal, Canada	President: Guy Rouleau
27th	2025	Seoul, South Korea	President: Jae-Moon Kim
28th	2027	Cape Town, South Africa	President: Patty Francis; 1st Vice-President: Lawrence Tucker

== See also ==
World Federation of Neurosurgical Societies
