= Barbara Morgan (disambiguation) =

Barbara Morgan is an American astronaut.

Barbara Morgan may also refer to:

- Barbara Morgan (photographer) (1900–1992), American dance photographer
- Barbara Spofford Morgan (1887–1971), American educator, essayist and specialist in mental testing
- Sparkle Moore (born 1936), country music songwriter, born Barbara Morgan
