= Neuroscience nursing =

Field of nursing related to nervous system

Neuroscience nursing is a distinctive area within the discipline of nursing. It focuses on the care of individuals with brain, spine and nervous system disorders. Neuroscience nurses work in a wide range of settings from academic medical centers to skilled nursing facilities, rehabilitation units to epilepsy monitoring units. Neuroscience nurses can be found in virtually any setting that nurses practice.

== History ==
=== 19th century ===
The first reports of nurses providing direct care to patients with neurological diseases came out of France and England in the late 19th century. Nurses observed Sir Victor Horsley's first operation at the National Hospital for the Paralysed and Epileptic in London. To have the skills necessary to care for the complex patient population nurses at the time knew they needed specialized training. At the time training there was no formal training and to gain specialized knowledge nurses at the time only had informal training that was provided by physicians sharing their knowledge.

Around the same time, neuroscience nursing started to emerge in the United States as a nursing specialty. The emergence of neuroscience nursing is due in part to Dr. Charles Karsner Mills, a physician at Philadelphia General Hospital. He held lectures for nurses on the care of patients with neurological diseases. In 1889 the content of these lectures was collected and The Nursing and Care of the Nervous and the Insane was published, thought to be the first textbook on neuroscience nursing.

=== 20th century ===
In 1910, Amy Hilliard became the first superintendent of the nurses at the New York Neurological Institute. She went on to organize the first post-graduate courses that focused on neuroscience nursing. These courses continued to be led by physicians. It was not until the 1960s that neuroscience nursing courses were taught by specialty trained nurses, with the University of California School of Nursing in San Francisco and the New York Medical College in New York leading the way in training neuroscience nurses.

== Professional organization ==
=== American Association of Neuroscience Nursing ===
In 1968 the American Association of Neurosurgical Nurses (AANN) was founded. The creation of AANN was a collaboration between Barbara Therrien, a nurse instructor at Barnes Hospital in St. Louis Missouri and Dr. Henry Schwartz, the president of the American Association of Neuroscience Surgeons. A colleague of Dr. Henry presented the idea to Agnes M. Marshall. The inaugural AANN education conference was held in Chicago in 1968, with over 100 nurses in attendance. In 1970 AANN applied for membership into the World Federation of Neurosurgical Societies and was the first nursing organization accepted. Since the founding of AANN it has been the leading authority in neuroscience nursing. Today AANN has over 5,200 members worldwide.

In 1977 AANN published its first textbook dedicated to educating nurses on the specialty field of neuroscience nursing. It published updates in 1984, 1990, 2004, and 2010. The current version, released in 2016, continues to expand the field of neuroscience nursing by educating new and experienced nurses in this distinct field that requires a combination of knowledge and meticulous assessment skills.

=== American Board of Neuroscience Nursing ===
The American Board of Neuroscience Nursing (ABNN) was created under the supervision of the AANN. It was created to develop certification specifically for neuroscience nursing. The first certification offered by ABNN was the Certified Neuroscience Registered Nurse (CNRN). This certification was developed and initially offered to nurses in 1978. In 2013, ABNN, again in collaboration with AANN, developed and offered a certification as Stroke Certified Registered Nurse (SCRN).

=== Journals ===
Journal of Neuroscience Nursing (JNN) is the official journal of AANN. It contains original articles specific to the nursing care and techniques for the specialty population of neurology and neurosurgery. The articles within the journal are applicable to all health care professionals who work across the continuum of care of the neuroscience patients.
