= American Neurological Association =

US association for academic neurologists and neuroscientists

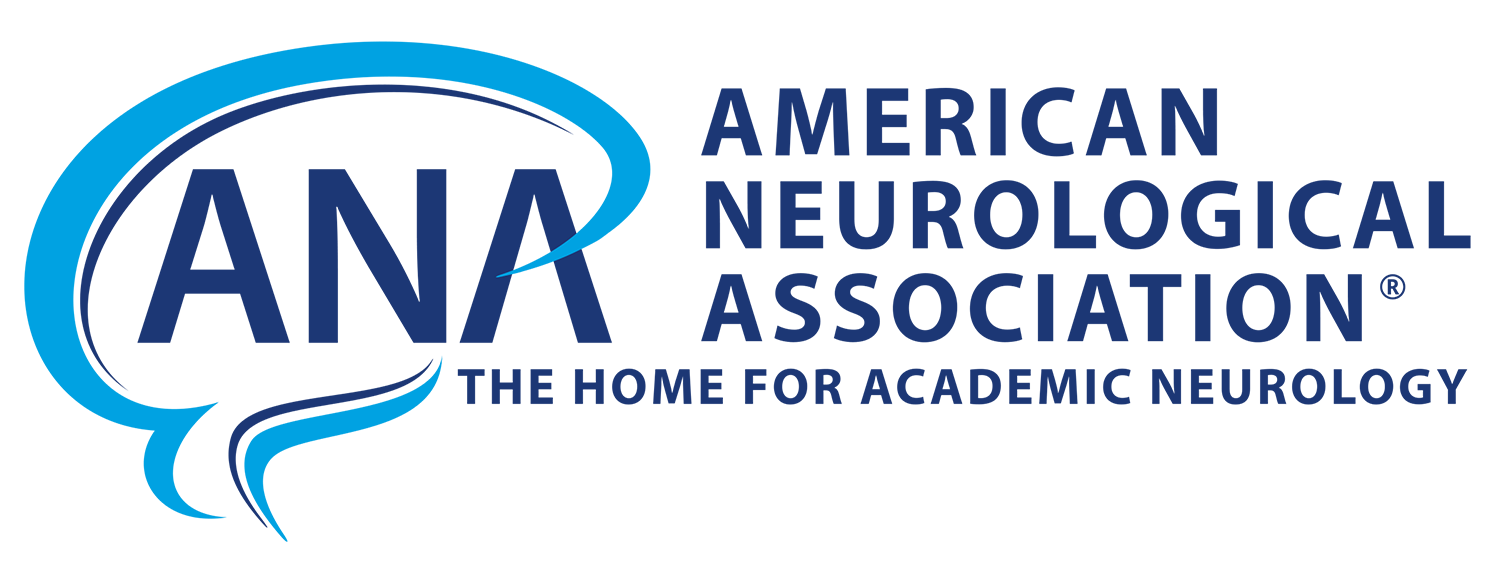
- Abbreviation: ANA
- Founded: 1875
- Type: Professional association
- Purpose: Academic neurology and neuroscience
- Headquarters: Mount Laurel, New Jersey, U.S.
- President: Dimitri Krainc, MD, PhD, FANA (2025–2027)
- President-Elect: S. Thomas Carmichael, MD, PhD, FANA (2025–2027)
- CEO: Brenda Orffer, CAE
- Website: myana.org

The American Neurological Association (ANA) is a professional society of academic neurologists and neuroscientists devoted to the advancement of neurology through education and research. Founded in 1875, it is the oldest neurological society in the United States and serves as a leading forum for the presentation and discussion of scientific work in neurology. The ANA publishes the peer-reviewed journals Annals of Neurology and Annals of Clinical and Translational Neurology. The ANA family of journals also includes the Annals of the Child Neurology Society.

== History ==
The ANA was founded in 1875 as the first national society devoted to the study of diseases of the nervous system in the United States. Its creation reflected the recognition of neurology as a distinct medical discipline separate from general medicine and psychiatry. Early members included William A. Hammond, James S. Jewell, Edward C. Séguin, Charles K. Mills, and James J. Putnam, who were influential in establishing the academic foundations of neurology in North America.

In 1884, the association elected Sarah J. McNutt as its first woman member, a milestone that reflected the gradual entry of women into mainstream American medicine.

During the 20th century, the ANA became a leading forum for the presentation of neurological research and contributed to the development of training programs for neurologists in U.S. medical schools. Its membership and programming have since expanded to reflect advances in neuroscience and the globalization of academic medicine.

== Publications ==
The official journal of the ANA is Annals of Neurology, published in partnership with Wiley. Established in 1977, the journal publishes original research articles, reviews, and editorials covering a broad spectrum of neurological science.

Annals of Clinical and Translational Neurology, launched in 2014, is an open-access, peer-reviewed journal that publishes research articles, reviews, and clinical case studies across all areas of neurology and neuroscience.

The ANA also circulates weekly newsletters and digital updates to its membership, providing information on society initiatives, career opportunities, and research highlights. In addition, it produces a monthly podcast, ANA Investigates, featuring interviews with experts on current topics in neurology and neuroscience.

== Programs and Initiatives ==
The ANA supports a variety of programs aimed at fostering the careers of academic neurologists and neuroscientists. These include:

- Career Development Programs – mentorship, networking, and training opportunities for early-career members.
- Academic Excellence Initiatives – efforts to broaden representation in academic neurology.
- Policy and Advocacy – advancing funding priorities and public awareness of the value of academic neurology.

== Annual Meeting ==
The ANA hosts an annual scientific meeting, considered one of the premier venues for presenting advances in academic neurology. The meeting includes plenary sessions, symposia, workshops, and poster presentations, as well as professional development opportunities for early-career and trainee neurologists.

Named lectures and awards are presented annually, including the George W. Jacoby, the Derek Denny-Brown Young Neurological Scholar, the Raymond D. Adams, and the Audrey S. Penn awards, which recognize significant contributions to the field.

== Leadership and Governance ==
The ANA is governed by an Executive Committee, which includes elected officers such as the President, President-Elect, Secretary, and Treasurer. The presidency rotates bi-annually, with past presidents including leaders in both academic and clinical neuroscience. The current ANA President (2025–2027) is Dr. Dimitri Krainc.

Committees oversee areas such as education, membership, diversity and inclusion, and scientific programming. The association is headquartered in Mount Laurel, New Jersey.

== Membership ==
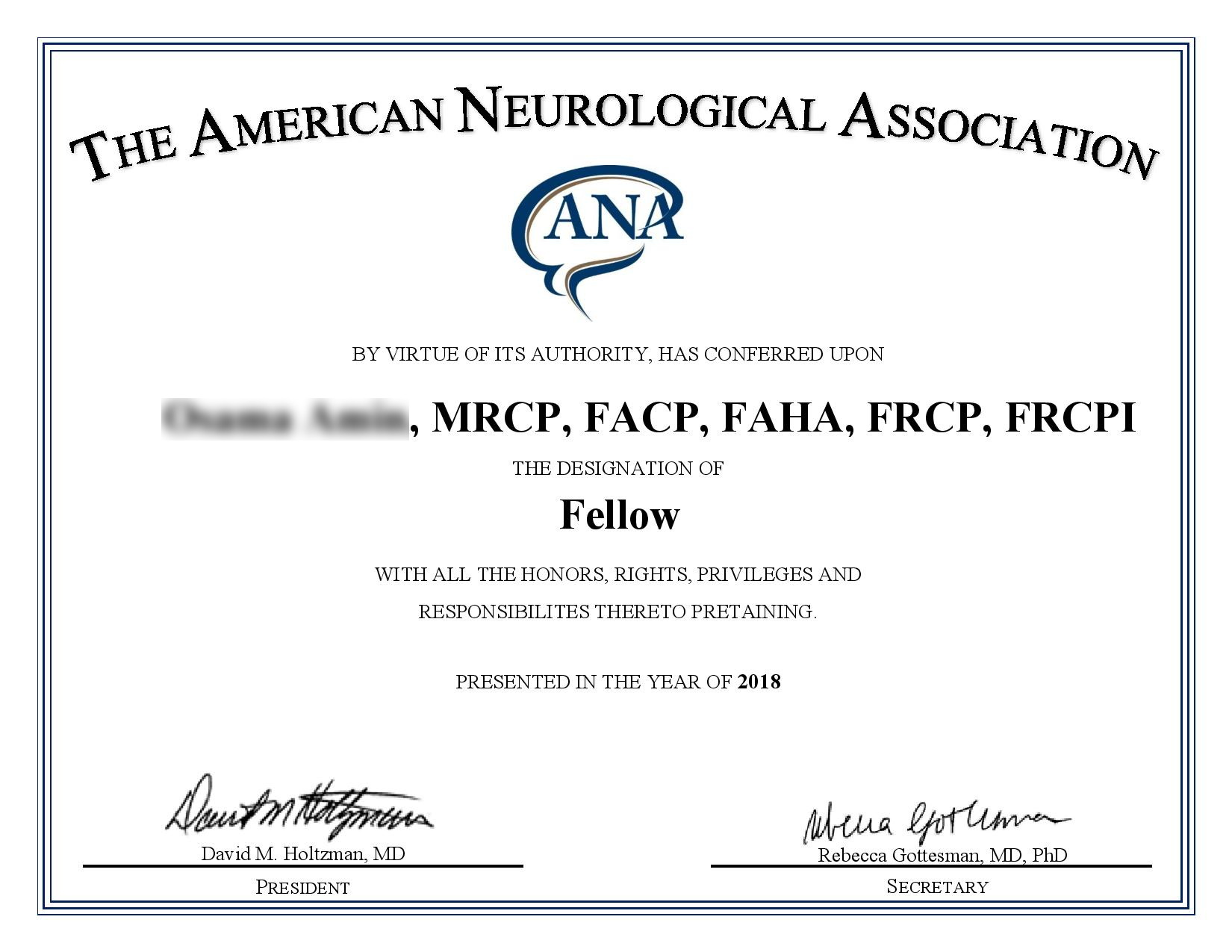
Fellowship certificate, the American Neurological Association.

The American Neurological Association is a leading professional society for academic neurology and neuroscience. The association offers several categories of membership, including:

- Fellows – physician–scientists or neuroscientists with senior faculty appointments (associate professor, full professor, or chair level) in accredited neurology departments in the United States or Canada.
- Members – faculty at the instructor or assistant professor level, or those in their first faculty appointment.
- Associates – individuals (MD, PhD, or MD/PhD) enrolled in accredited training programs in neurology or related neuroscience fields.
- Students – undergraduate, graduate, or professional students (MD, PhD, MD/PhD, master’s) with proof of student status.
- Senior Fellows – Fellows who have reached the age of 70 and are no longer active in neurology.
- Corresponding Members – faculty, trainees, or students residing outside the United States and Canada, with special provisions for those in low- and middle-income countries.
- Affiliate Members – professionals affiliated with non-profit foundations, associations, advocacy groups, or other organizations aligned with academic neurology and neuroscience.
- Industry Liaisons – MD, DO, or PhD professionals working in industry with a neuroscience focus.
- Honorary Fellows – individuals elected to membership by the ANA in recognition of distinguished professional or scientific contributions.

== Notable Members and Contributions ==
Early figures associated with the American Neurological Association included William A. Hammond, widely credited as a principal organizer of the society’s founding, and Edward C. Séguin, who served as recording secretary and treasurer at the first ANA meeting in June 1875. These physicians, along with contemporaries such as James S. Jewell and Silas Weir Mitchell, were part of a cohort that helped consolidate neurology as a distinct academic discipline in the United States during the late nineteenth century.

Hammond is also noted for advancing the professionalization of neurology in America; his Treatise on Diseases of the Nervous System (1871) is often described as the first comprehensive American neurology textbook, and later historical analyses emphasize his influence on the field.

The ANA’s role in the maturation of American neurology is documented in historical analyses that describe the society as a premier venue for presenting neurological research and, by some accounts, the first national neurology society formed worldwide.

=== Presidents of the American Neurological Association ===
Since its founding in 1875, the American Neurological Association has been led by a succession of presidents representing leading figures in American academic neurology.

Below is a complete list of individuals who have served as President of the ANA (year — name):

- 2025–2027 — Dimitri Krainc, MD, PhD
- 2023–2025 — M. Elizabeth Ross, MD, PhD
- 2022–2023 — Frances E. Jensen, MD
- 2020–2021 — Justin C. McArthur, MBBS, MPH
- 2018–2019 — David M. Holtzman, MD
- 2016–2017 — Barbara Vickrey, MD, MPH
- 2014–2015 — Robert H. Brown Jr., DPhil, MD
- 2012–2013 — Eva Feldman, MD, PhD
- 2010–2011 — Robert L. Macdonald, MD, PhD
- 2008–2009 — Timothy Pedley, MD
- 2006–2007 — Stephen L. Hauser, MD
- 2004–2005 — John W. Griffin, MD
- 2002–2003 — Anne B. Young, MD, PhD
- 2000–2001 — Richard J. Baringer, MD
- 1998–1999 — Jerome B. Posner, MD
- 1997 — John N. Whitaker, MD
- 1995 — David A. Drachman, MD
- 1994 — Audrey S. Penn, MD
- 1993 — Peter J. Dyck, MD
- 1992 — Guy M. McKhann, MD
- 1991 — Robert B. Daroff, MD
- 1990 — Joseph B. Martin, MD, PhD
- 1989 — Sid Gilman, MD
- 1988 — Robert J. Joynt, MD, PhD
- 1987 — Richard T. Johnson, MD
- 1986 — Robert Katzman, MD
- 1985 — James F. Toole, MD
- 1984 — Robert A. Fishman, MD
- 1983 — Arthur K. Asbury, MD
- 1982 — Jack P. Whisnant
- 1981 — Lewis P. Rowland
- 1980 — Peritz Scheinberg
- 1979 — Sidney Carter
- 1978 — William M. Landau
- 1977 — Fred Plum
- 1976 — Samuel A. Trufant
- 1975 — Joseph M. Foley
- 1974 — Clark H. Millikan
- 1973 — M. B. Bender
- 1972 — Paul C. Bucy
- 1971 — Abe B. Baker
- 1970 — Melvin D. Yahr
- 1969 — Augustus S. Rose
- 1968 — Adolph L. Sahs
- 1967 — Raymond D. Adams
- 1966 — Earl A. Walker
- 1965 — Russell DeJong
- 1964 — Richard B. Richter
- 1963 — Charles D. Aring
- 1962 — James L. O’Leary
- 1961 — Harold G. Wolff
- 1960 — Derek E. Denny-Brown
- 1959 — Bernard J. Alpers
- 1958 — Israel S. Wechsler
- 1957 — Houston H. Merritt
- 1956 — Johannes M. Nielson
- 1955 — Percival Bailer
- 1954 — Roland P. Mackay
- 1953 — Hans H. Reese
- 1952 — Bernard S. Wortis
- 1951 — Wilder Penfield
- 1950 — Henry W. Woltman
- 1949 — Stanley Cobb
- 1948 — George Wilson
- 1947 — Henry Alsop Riley
- 1945–1946 — Walter F. Schaller
- 1944 — Edwin G. Zabriskie
- 1943 — Ernest Sachs
- 1942 — Lewis J. Pollock
- 1941 — Harry Solomon
- 1940 — Foster Kennedy (Douglas H. Singer died in office)
- 1939 — William B. Cadwalader
- 1938 — Charles A. Elsberg
- 1937 — Henry H. Donaldson
- 1936 — Albert M. Barrett
- 1935 — Colin Russell
- 1934 — Israel Strauss
- 1933 — Daniel J. McCarthy
- 1932 — Bernard Sachs
- 1931 — James B. Ayer
- 1930 — Smith Ely Jelliffe
- 1929 — Charles H. Frazier
- 1928 — Charles L. Dana
- 1927 — Peter Bassoe
- 1926 — Frederick Tilney
- 1925 — Frederick Peterson
- 1924 — Charles Mills
- 1923 — Harvey Cushing
- 1922 — Adolf Meyer
- 1921 — Sidney I. Schwab
- 1920 — Ramsey J. Hunt
- 1919 — James McBride
- 1918 — Theodore H. Weisenburg
- 1917 — Edward W. Taylor
- 1916 — Lewellys F. Barker
- 1915 — George W. Jacoby
- 1914 — Henry Hun
- 1913 — Pearce Bailey
- 1912 — William N. Bullard
- 1911 — H. M. Thomas
- 1910 — Morton Prince
- 1909 — S. Weir Mitchell
- 1908 — Charles W. Burr
- 1907 — Hugh T. Patrick
- 1906 — Henry R. Stedman
- 1905 — William G. Spiller
- 1904 — Frank R. Fry
- 1903 — J. W. Putnam
- 1902 — Joseph Collins
- 1901 — George L. Walton
- 1900 — E. D. Fisher
- 1899 — James Hendrie Lloyd
- 1898 — G. M. Hammond
- 1897 — M. A. Starr
- 1896 — Francis X. Dercum
- 1895 — Philip C. Knapp
- 1894 — Bernard Sachs
- 1893 — Henry M. Lyman
- 1892 — Charles L. Dana
- 1891 — Wharton Sinkler
- 1890 — E. C. Spitzka
- 1889 — Edward C. Séguin
- 1888 — James J. Putnam
- 1887 — Landon C. Gray
- 1886 — Charles K. Mills
- 1885 — Burt G. Wilder
- 1884 — Isaac Ott
- 1883 — R. T. Edes
- 1882 — William A. Hammond
- 1881 — Robert Bartholow
- 1880 — Frank T. Miles
- 1875–1879 — James S. Jewell
- 1875 — S. Weir Mitchell (President-elect)
