= Merritt's Neurology =

Standard Neurology textbook

Merritt's Neurology (earlier editions were known as A Textbook of Neurology by H. Houston Merritt and later Merritt's Textbook of Neurology) is a standard textbook of neurology, currently in its 14th edition (Wolters Kluwer, 2021), edited by Elan Louis, Stephan A. Mayer, and James M. Noble.

== Background ==
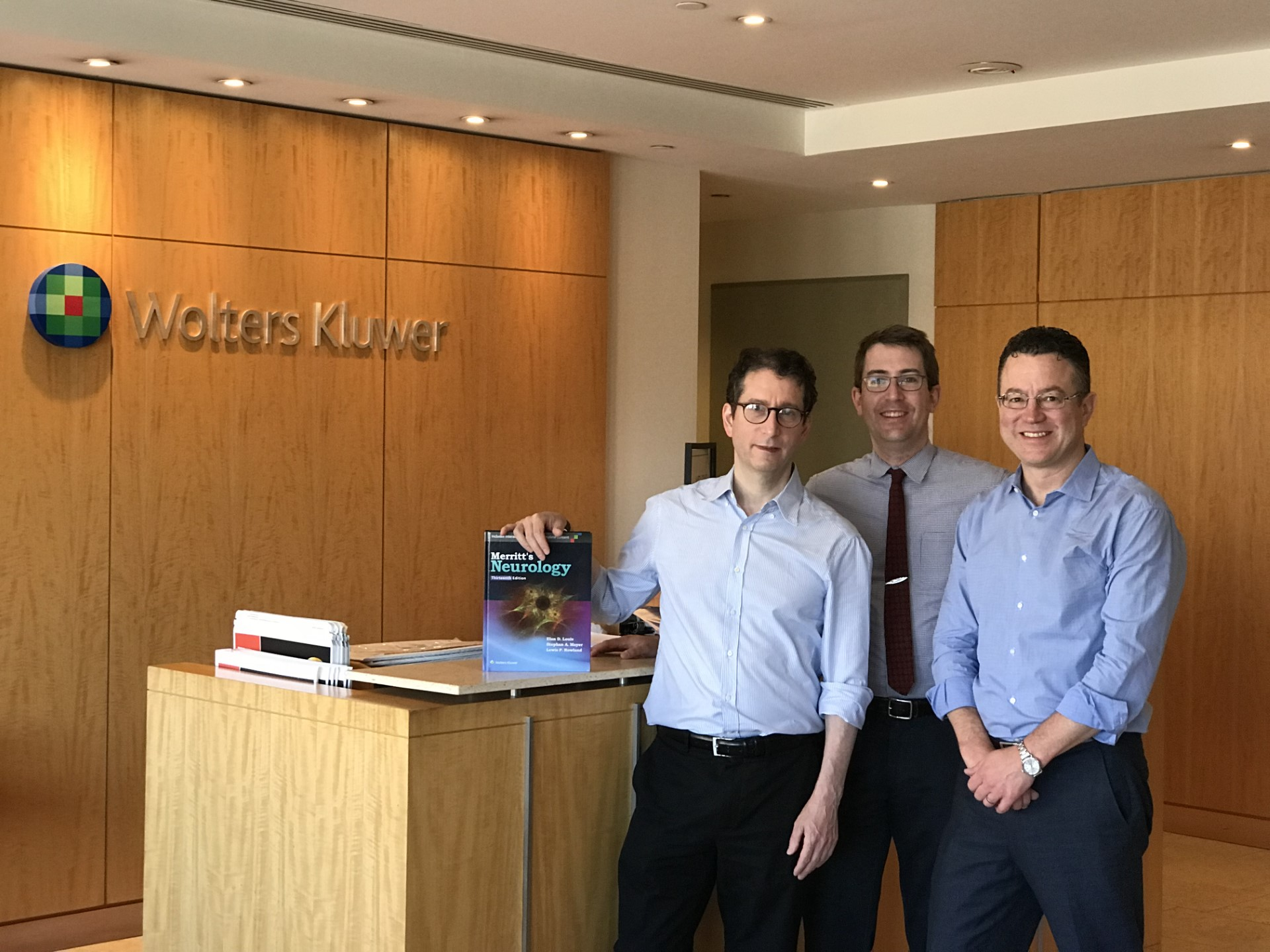
Drs. Elan D. Louis, James M. Noble, and Stephan A. Mayer in New York City, May 2018 at 14th edition planning meeting

The book began in 1955 as a sole author publication by its originator H. Houston Merritt, and has had a total of 6 editors or co-editors since its inception, including H. Houston Merritt (Editions 1-6 until his death in 1979), Lewis P. Rowland (Eds 7-13 until his death in 2017), Timothy A. Pedley (2010), and currently Louis (2016–present), Mayer (2016–present), and Noble (2021-present).

Since its first edition, Merritt's Neurology has remained a central text in clinical neurology, providing unparalleled guidance on neurologic protocols, treatment guidelines, clinical pathways, therapeutic recommendations, and imaging. The current, 14th edition, has been selected as a Doody's Core Title for 2022 and 2023. In 2022, Doody's gave the 14th Edition of Merritt's a 4 star rating (along with a 93 score), calling it "the neurological equivalent to Harrison's Principles of Medicine."

== Primary Editors and English Editions ==
- 1st edition (1955, reprinted 1955, 1957): H. Houston Merritt [as sole author] (Lea & Febiger, Philadelphia), 746pp
- 2nd edition (1959, reprinted 1959, 1961): H. Houston Merritt [as sole author] (Lea & Febiger, Philadelphia), 765pp
- 3rd edition (1963, reprinted 1964, 1966): H. Houston Merritt [as sole author] (Lea & Febiger, Philadelphia), 803pp
- 4th edition (1967, reprinted 1968, 1969, 1970): H. Houston Merritt [as sole author] (Lea & Febiger, Philadelphia), 844pp
- 5th edition (1973): H. Houston Merritt (Lea & Febiger, Philadelphia), 841pp
- 6th edition (1979): H. Houston Merritt (Lea & Febiger, Philadelphia), 961pp
- 7th edition (1984): Lewis P. Rowland (Lea & Febiger, Philadelphia), 774pp
- 8th edition (1989): Lewis P. Rowland (Lea & Febiger, Philadelphia), 964pp
- 9th edition (1995): Lewis P. Rowland (Williams & WIlkins, Baltimore), 1058pp
- 10th edition (2000): Lewis P. Rowland (Lippincott Williams & Wilkins), 1002pp
- 11th edition (2005): Lewis P. Rowland (Lippincott Williams & Wilkins), 1271pp
- 12th edition (2010): Lewis P. Rowland and Timothy A. Pedley (Wolters-Kluwer/Lippincott Williams & Wilkins), 1172pp
- 13th edition (2016): Elan D. Louis, Stephan A. Mayer, and Lewis P. Rowland (Wolters-Kluwer), 1402pp
- 14th edition (2021): Elan D. Louis, Stephan A. Mayer, and James M. Noble (Wolters-Kluwer), 1718pp

== Additional or derivative works ==
- Merritt's Neurology Handbook (2001): Pietro Mazzoni and Lewis P. Rowland (Lippincott Williams & Wilkins), handbook meant to track the 10th edition of the textbook
- Merritt's Neurology Handbook (PDA version, 2004): Pietro Mazzoni and Lewis P. Rowland (Lippincott Williams & Wilkins; powered by Skyscape, Inc), personal digital assistant version of the 2001 handbook
- Merritt's Neurology Handbook (2006): Pietro Mazzoni, Toni Shih Pearson, and Lewis P. Rowland (Lippincott Williams & Wilkins), handbook meant to track the 11th edition of the textbook
- Merritt's Neurology Review (Wolters Kluwer, 2024, e-book and paperback): Jon Rosenberg, Andrew Bauerschmidt, James M. Noble, Stephan A. Mayer, and Elan D. Louis. More than 750 questions developed from the 14th edition of Merritt's Neurology.

== Translations ==
- Merritt Tratado De Neurologia (Spanish, 1982, 2nd edition): Lewis P. Rowland (Salvat Editores S.A.), followed the 6th (English) edition; Translators: Drs. Antonia Grimalt and Pilar Latorre
- Merritt Tratado De Neurologia (Spanish, 1987): Lewis P. Rowland (Salvat Editores, S.A.), followed the 7th (English) edition
- Trattato di neurologia: Merritt (Italian, 1993): Lewis P. Rowland (Momento Medico, Italy), followed the 8th (English) edition
- Merritt Tratado De Neurologia (Portuguese, 1997): Lewis P. Rowland (FisicalBook, Brazil), followed the 9th (English) edition
- Merritt manual de neurología (Spanish, 2002): Pietro Mazzoni and Lewis P. Rowland (McGraw-Hill), Spanish version of the 2001 handbook
- Merritt's Neurology: Decima Edizione (Italian, in 2 volumes, 2002): Lewis P. Rowland (centro scientifico internazionale, Italy), followed the 10th (English) edition
- Merritt's Neurology: (Chinese, 2002): Lewis P. Rowland, (Liaoning Science and Technology Press; Translators: Li Kuncheng, Jiang Xinmei, Chen Shengdi, Gao Xuguang), followed the 10th (English) edition
- Merritt Neurologia (Polish, 2008): Lewis P. Rowland (Polish version editors: Anna Kamińska and Hubert Kwieciński; published by Elsevier Urban & Partner, Poland; translated by Jacek Bojakowski), followed the 11th (English) edition
- Neurología de Merritt (Spanish, 2011): Lewis P. Rowland and Timothy A. Pedley (Wolters-Kluwer/Lippincott Williams & Wilkins), paired with 12th (English) edition
- Merritt: Tratado De Neurologia (Portuguese, 2011): Lewis P. Rowland and Timothy A. Pedley, (Guanbara Koogan, Brazil) followed the 12th (English) edition
- Merritt Neurologia (Polish, in 2 volumes, 2017): Elan D. Louis, Stephan A. Mayer, and Lewis P. Rowland (Polish version editor: Wojceich Turaj; published by Edra Urban & Partner, Poland), followed the 13th (English) edition
- Merritt: Tratado De Neurologia (Portuguese, 2018): Elan D. Louis, Stephan A. Mayer, and Lewis P. Rowland (Wolters-Kluwer; Guanabara Koogan), followed the 13th (English) edition
- Merritt Nöroloji (Turkish, 2020): Elan D. Louis, Stephan A. Mayer, and Lewis P. Rowland (Turkish translation editors: N Prof. Dr. Okan DOĞU - Dr. Öğr. Üyesi Nevra Öksüz; published by Güneş Tıp Kitabevleri and Wolters-Kluwer), followed the 13th (English) edition
- Merritt Neurologia (Polish, in 2 volumes, 2023): Elan D. Louis, Stephan A. Mayer, and James M. Noble (Polish version editor: Wojceich Turaj; published by Edra Urban & Partner, Poland and Wolters-Kluwer), followed the 14th (English) edition
- Merritt Nöroloji (Turkish, 2025): Elan D. Louis, Stephan A. Mayer, and James M. Noble (Turkish translation editors: Prof. Dr. İsmet Murat Melek, Prof. Dr. Ayşe Filiz Koç; published by KRC Başkent Medical Bookstore and Wolters-Kluwer), followed the 14th (English) edition
