= Charles Poser =

American neurologist (1923–2010)

Charles Marcel Poser (1923–2010) was an American neurologist. He was a Fellow of the Royal College of Physicians of Edinburgh (FRCPE).

Poser was born on December 30, 1923, in Antwerp, Belgium. He died on November 11, 2010, in Boston, Massachusetts, US.

== Early life ==
His parents, fearing the outbreak of World War II, tried to move to the United States. Their travel plans were derailed by the German invasion of France and the low countries. The Luftwaffe's aerial bombardment of Antwerp caused them to evacuate to De Panne. De Panne was near Dunkirk. When the allied front collapsed, sixteen year old Charles, on the strength of boy scout badge in first aid, volunteered to help at a British field hospital, during the Evacuation of Dunkirk.

His family did make it to New York City, where he finished high school in 1941. He started studying at the City College of New York, but left to enlist in the United States Army. He was one of the Ritchie Boys, trained as an interrogator at Camp Ritchie and assigned to Army military intelligence due to his ability to speak French, Dutch, and German. Poser was stationed in Bastogne, when it was surrounded by German troops, during the Battle of the Bulge. He was present during the liberation of the Mauthausen concentration camp.

== Career ==
After the war, he finished his degree at CCNY, and earned a medical degree at the Columbia Medical School. After earning his medical degree, he was a resident in Neurology at the New York Neurological Institute of Columbia-Presbyterian Medical Center, where he worked under H. Houston Merritt.

He studied at the Institute Bunge, in Antwerp, in 1955, after earning a Fulbright Scholarship, where he studied under Ludo van Bogaert. According to a profile of Poser by the FRCPE, he credited his two mentors, Merritt and Bogaert, with inspiring the research that made him famous.

Upon his return to America, Poser first joined the faculty at the University of Kansas. He would later teach at the University of Missouri in Kansas City. In 1969 he moved to the University of Vermont as chair of the Department of Neurology. In 1982 he moved to Boston, Massachusetts, where he was associated with Beth Israel Hospital, Harvard Medical School, and the Veterans Administration Hospital.

Poser's particular interest was diseases of the myelin. His major scientific accomplishment was "the first definitive system for measuring and describing MS", the Poser criteria unveiled in 1983.
