= Transactions of the American Neurological Association =

Scientific journal

- Discipline: Neurology
- Language: English

Publication details
- History: 1875 to 1981
- Publisher: Springer Publishing (United States)
- Frequency: Annual

Standard abbreviations
- ISO 4: Trans. Am. Neurol. Assoc.

Indexing
- ISSN: 0065-9479
- National Library Of Medicine

Transactions of the American Neurological Association was an American journal published between 1875 and 1981. It covered the field of neurology.

== See also ==
- American Neurological Association
