= Sarah McNutt =

American physician

Sarah J. McNutt
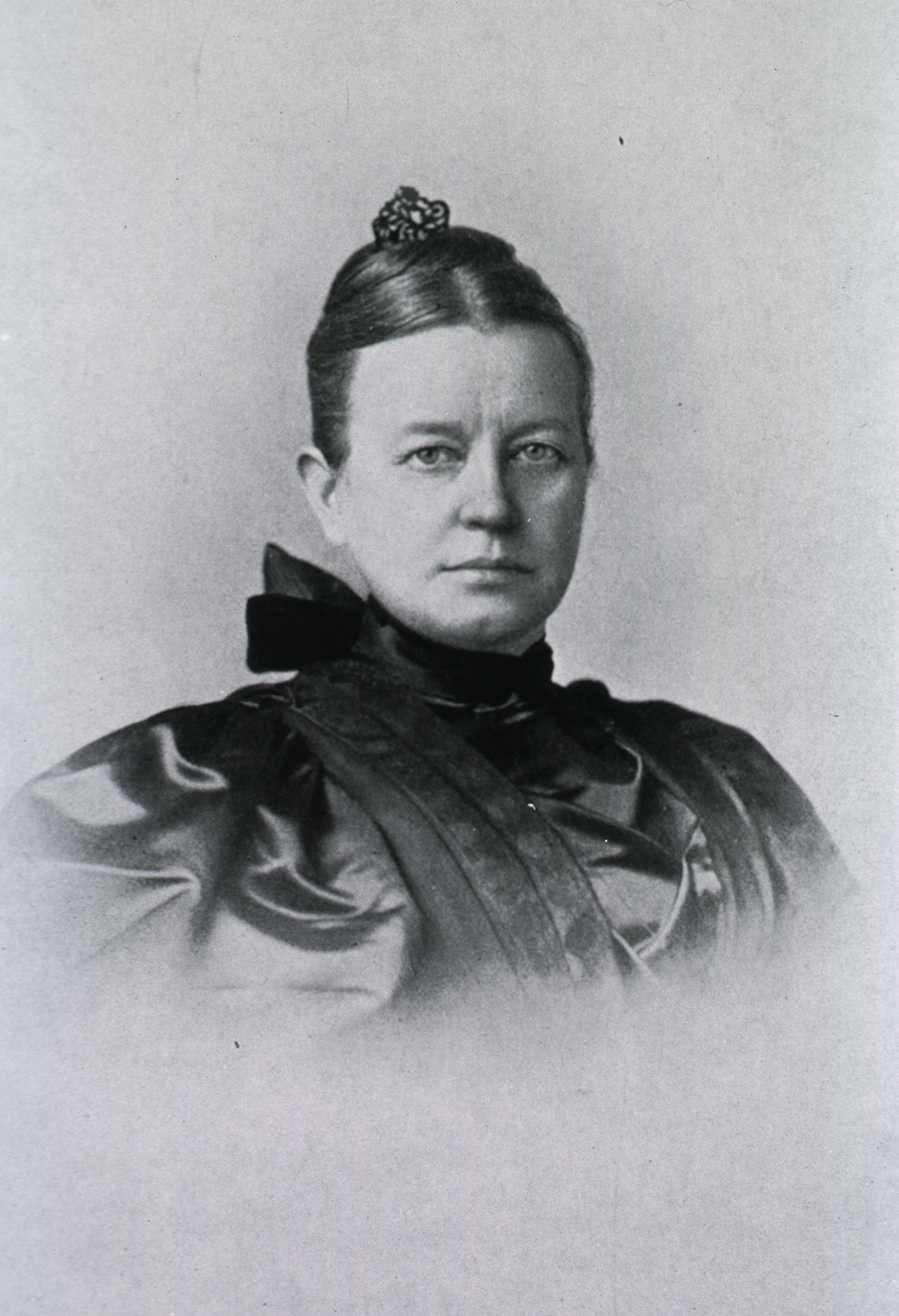
- Born: July 22, 1839; Warrensburg, New York
- Died: September 10, 1930 (aged 91); Albany, New York
- Education: Albany Normal School, Emma Willard Seminary at Troy, Woman's Medical College of the New York Infirmary
- Organization: American Neurological Association

Sarah Jane McNutt (July 22, 1839 – September 10, 1930) was an American physician, notable as the first woman inducted into the American Neurological Association. McNutt was a founder of the Babies' Hospital in New York City, now known as Morgan Stanley Children's Hospital, along with her sister Dr. Julia G McNutt. Her mentors and co-workers Elizabeth Blackwell and Emily Blackwell were some of the first female physicians in the United States. She focused her work on pediatrics, neurology, and medical education.

== Early life ==
McNutt was born in Warrensburg, New York to parents James McNutt and Adaline (Waite) McNutt. Her sister, Julia McNutt (1844-1928), was also a physician. Julia founded the Post-Graduate Training School for Nurses, and worked on the Babies' Hospital with Sarah. Sarah attended the Albany Normal School and the Emma Willard Seminary at Troy, where she learned to teach which was her career for several years.

== Medical career ==
=== Education ===
In 1877 McNutt graduated from the Woman's Medical College of the New York Infirmary. For two years, until 1879, she interned at the Woman's Medical College of the New York Infirmary hospital. Her colleagues and mentors, Elizabeth and Emily Blackwell and Dr. Mary Putnam Jacobi, shared interests of hers, including pediatrics and neurology. McNutt worked alongside these women at the medical college and hospital for several years.

=== Teaching ===
McNutt taught a course in gynecology at the medical college and was an instructor of surgery. Along with Dr. Jacobi, she helped to found the New York Post Graduate Medical School and Hospital, which continued physician education through lectures. McNutt gave three per week on pediatrics. She was among the first to teach about both pediatric diseases and the correlation between abnormal pathology and disease states, using the morgue to do so.

=== Pediatrics ===
McNutt worked for 11 years in the children's department of the Women's Medical College of the New York Infirmary hospital. She spent much of her time working towards creating the field of pediatrics, designing a specialty in diseases of children. McNutt found, using a citywide survey, that there was no pediatric ward in any New York hospital. There were only 10 beds dedicated to the pediatric population. After creating a pediatric ward at the New York Post Graduate Medical School in 1888, McNutt and her sister Julia, along with physicians Jeannie Smith, Isabella Satherthwaite and Isabella Banks, opened the Babies' Hospital for children two years old and younger. The name of the hospital has changed multiple times, and the age of patients has expanded from two years and under to up to 20 years of age.

=== Neurology ===
In 1884, McNutt was elected the first female member of the American Neurological Association (ANA), at the 10th annual meeting. Royal W. Amidon, secretary of the ANA in 1883, was a consultant of the hospital where McNutt worked. McNutt had clinical contact with ANA members C.L. Dana and William A. Hammond, through her work at the medical school and hospital. Amidon and Hammond were the two members to nominate McNutt.

At her induction meeting, she presented a paper titled "Provisional Report of a Case of Double Infantile Spastic Hemiplegia." She described "a girl of two and a half years – never had walked, never had talked; all of the limbs were smaller than normal, especially upon the left side." After this child died of pneumonia, McNutt performed the autopsy and reported her results. She would later publish six additional cases of spastic hemiplegia.

McNutt's work on what we now call cerebral palsy was cited in William Gowers' seminal textbook Manual of Diseases of the Nervous System. MacDonald Critchley, in his biography of Gowers, wrote that he was not a "rabid misogynist" but thought McNutt had contributed more than any other women at that time. Her work is also cited in William Osler's book The Cerebral Palsies of Children, and in A Study of Cerebral Palsies of Early Life, Based Upon an Analysis of One Hundred and Forty Cases by Bernard Sachs' and Frederick Peterson.

== Death ==
McNutt died in Albany, New York on September 10, 1930.

== Medical societies ==
- New York Academy of Medicine
- New York County Medical Society
- State and American Medical Associations
- Women's Medical Society
- Women's State Medical Society
  - McNutt was elected 3rd vice president of New York chapter
- New York Pathological Society
- Schenectady County Medical Society
- American Society of Sanitary and Moral Prophylaxis
- American Neurological Association (1884-1902)

== Works ==
- McNutt, Sarah J (1885). "Double Infantile Spastic Hemiplegia". The Journal of Nervous and Mental Disease. 12 (2): 225–228. doi:10.1097/00005053-188504000-00031.
- McNutt, Sarah (1885). "Seven Cases of Infantile Spastic Hemiplegia". Archives of Pediatrics (2): 20–34.
- McNutt, Sarah J (1885). "Apoplexia Neonatorum". The American Journal of Obstetrics and Diseases of Women and Children. 18 (1): 73. ProQuest 128171992.
- McNutt, Sarah J (1889). "The Babies' Hospital: a Summer's Work". Medical Record. 35 (9): 234.
- McNutt, Sarah J (1905). "Notes on Non-Operative Gynecology". Canadian Journal of Medicine and Surgery. 68 (20): 765.
- McNutt, Sarah J (1912). "Non-Operative Treatment of Sterility". Medical Record. 81 (25): 1180–1183.
- McNutt, Sarah J (1918). Medical Women, Yesterday and Today (reprint ed.). W. Woods and Company. p. 17.
- McNutt, Sarah J (1921). "Dr. Elizabeth Blackwell, Her Character and Personality". Medical Record. 100: 922.
