= Journal of the Neurological Sciences =

- Discipline: Neurology
- Language: English
- Edited by: John D. England

Publication details
- History: 1964–present
- Publisher: Elsevier
- Frequency: Monthly
- Impact factor: 4.553

Standard abbreviations
- ISO 4: J. Neurol. Sci.

Indexing
- CODEN: JNSCAG
- ISSN: 0022-510X (print); 1878-5883 (web)
- LCCN: 68001332
- OCLC no.: 1783295

Links
- Journal homepage

Journal of the Neurological Sciences is a peer-reviewed medical journal covering the field of neurology. It is also the official journal of the World Federation of Neurology. According to the Journal Citation Reports, it received an impact factor of 4.453.
