= DaiWai Olson =

American nurse (born 1962)

DaiWai M. Olson (born 1962) is an American nurse.

Olson completed an associate degree in nursing at Scott Community College in 1986, and finished a bachelor's degree in 1997, graduating from Teikyo Marycrest University. He obtained his PhD from the University of North Carolina at Chapel Hill. Olson was a researcher at Duke University from 1994 to 2013, when he started working at the University of Texas Southwestern Medical Center. He became editor-in-chief of the Journal of Neuroscience Nursing in 2016, succeeding V. Susan Carroll. In 2018, he became the first nurse promoted to the rank of professor.
