= Journal of Neuroscience Nursing =

- Discipline: Neuroscience nursing
- Language: English
- Edited by: DaiWai Olson

Publication details
- Former name(s): Journal of Neurosurgical Nursing
- History: 1969-present
- Publisher: Lippincott Williams & Wilkins
- Frequency: Bimonthly
- Impact factor: 0.945 (2018)

Standard abbreviations
- ISO 4: J. Neurosci. Nurs.

Indexing
- CODEN: JNNUEF
- ISSN: 0888-0395 (print); 1945-2810 (web)
- LCCN: 86641442
- OCLC no.: 13107404

Links
- Journal homepage; Online access; Online archive

Journal of Neuroscience Nursing is a bimonthly peer-reviewed medical journal covering "neurosurgical and neurological techniques as they affect nursing". It was established in 1969 as the Journal of Neurosurgical Nursing, obtaining its current name in 1986. It is published by Lippincott Williams & Wilkins on behalf of the American Association of Neuroscience Nurses, of which it is the official journal. The editor-in-chief is DaiWai Olson (University of Texas Southwestern Medical Center). According to the Journal Citation Reports, the journal has a 2020 impact factor of 1.230.
