= Edward Constant Séguin =

French-American neurologist

Edward Constant Séguin, MD (January 20, 1843 in Paris – February 19, 1898 in New York City) was an American neurologist and a founder of the American Neurological Association in 1875. He was a practitioner and professor at the College of Physicians and Surgeons in New York.

Séguin was the son of Édouard Séguin, a pioneer in the education of intellectually disabled children. Edward C. was born in Paris, France, and in 1850, due to political unrest in France, the family emigrated to the United States and settled in Cleveland, Ohio. Edward received his early education in Cleveland and Portsmouth. In 1861, the family moved to New York and he began medical studies at the College of Physicians and Surgeons. When the American Civil War began, Edward C. served as a dresser and medical cadet, resuming his studies at war's end. He received his medical degree in 1864 and he remained in the U.S. Army. From 1865 to 1867, he served as an intern at the New York Hospital. He suffered from a lung ailment and left the hospital. He re-entered the Army for a tour of duty and was stationed in New Mexico where he regained his health.

Séguin was in Paris from 1869 to 1870 to study diseases of the nervous system. He studied under Charles-Édouard Brown-Séquard and Jean-Martin Charcot. Upon his return to New York in 1870, he joined the practice of William Draper, a prominent physician to whom he introduced the practice of thermometry. The following year, Séguin was named to the Chair of Diseases of the Nervous System at the College of Physicians and Surgeons, and founded its neurological clinic. In 1876, he left the practice.

Séguin published many papers on neurological subjects and on neurosis. A large collection of his lectures was published under the title of Opera Minora. In 1873, he helped Brown-Séquard edit the journal, Archives of Scientific and Practical Medicine, which lasted only a short time. In 1879, he helped to found the journal Archives of Medicine. He was active within the short-lived Association for the Protection of the Insane, an organization of neurologists and medical professionals with the goal of improving patient care in mental hospitals.

In 1882, his wife suffered a severe depression, and shot and killed their three children and herself. Following this tragedy, Séguin returned to Europe where he worked in neurology. When he returned to the United States, he spent a year in Providence, Rhode Island, and regularly visited his patients in New York. In 1885, he resumed his practice in New York but resigned his teaching position. He retired from medical practice in 1896.

Séguin died in 1898 from cirrhosis of the liver.

== Works ==
- Séguin, Edward C. Spinal Paralysis of the Adult. Appleton and Co. New York, 1874.
- Séguin, Edward C. Hysterical Symptoms in Organic Nervous Affections. New York: John F. Trow & Son, printers, 1875.
- Séguin, Edward C. A Clinical Contribution to the Study of Post-paralytic Chorea: A Contribution to the Study of Localized Cerebral Lesions. New York: G.P. Putnam's Sons, 1877.
- Séguin, Edward C. Higher Medical Education in New York: II. Reorganization of the Medical Staff of Hospitals. New York: G.P. Putnam's Sons, 1881.
- Séguin, Edward C. Higher Medical Education in New York: III. The System of Clinical Teaching in Colleges. New York: G.P. Putnam's Sons, 1881.
- Séguin, Edward C. The American Method of Giving Potassium Iodide in very Large Doses for the Later Lesions of Syphilis, more especially Syphilis of the Nervous System. New York: [s.n., 1884?]
- Séguin, Edward C. Opera Minora: A Collection of Essays, Articles, Lectures and Addresses from 1866 to 1882 Inclusive. New York: G. P. Putnam's Sons, 1884. https://archive.org/details/operaminoracolle00segu
- Séguin, Edward C. A Contribution to the Pathology of the Cerebellum. New York: J.H. Vail & Co., 1887.
- Séguin, Edward C. Lectures on Some Points in the Treatment and Management of the Neuroses. New York: Appleton, 1890. https://archive.org/details/lecturesonsomepo00segu
