= Dimitri Krainc =

American neurologist and scientist

Dimitri Krainc is a Slovenian-born American physician-scientist who is the Aaron Montgomery Ward Professor and Chairman of the Ken & Ruth Davee Department of Neurology and Director of the Feinberg Neuroscience Institute and the Simpson Querrey Center for Neurogenetics at Northwestern University Feinberg School of Medicine. After completing his medical training at the University of Zagreb, Krainc spent more than two decades at the Massachusetts General Hospital and Harvard Medical School, where he completed his research and clinical training and served on faculty until relocating to Northwestern University in 2013. He has dedicated his scientific career to studying molecular pathways in the pathogenesis of neurodegeneration. His research group discovered how lysosomes and mitochondria interact in normal and diseased cells. This work opened a new area of cell biology for studies of diseases that involve mitochondria and lysosomes and led to pioneering design and development of targeted therapies. He has received numerous awards and recognitions for his work, including the Javits Neuroscience Investigator Award and the Outstanding Investigator award from NIH, and was elected to the Association of American Physicians, the US National Academy of Medicine, the US National Academy of Inventors, the Croatian Academy of Sciences and Arts, and the Slovenian Academy of Sciences and Arts. Krainc is associate editor of The Journal of Clinical Investigation. He is the principal founding scientist of two biotech companies and serves as Venture Partner at OrbiMed. Krainc is President of the American Neurological Association.

== Selected publications ==
- Minakaki, G. Safren, N., Bustos, B.I., Lubbe S.J., Mencacci, N.E. and Krainc, D (2025). Commander complex regulates lysosomal function and is implicated in Parkinson's disease risk, Science, 11;388(6743):204-211.
- Wong Y.C., Ysselstein, D. and Krainc, D (2018). Mitochondria-lysosome contacts regulate mitochondrial fission via Rab7 hydrolysis. Nature, 15;554(7692):382-386
- Burbulla, L.F., Song, P., Mazzulli, J.R., Zampese, E., Wong, Y.C., Jeon, S., Santos, D.P., Blanz, J., Obermaier, C., Strojny, C., Savas, J., Kiskinis, E., Zhuang, X., Krüger, R., Surmeier, J.D., Krainc, D. (2017) Dopamine oxidation mediates mitochondrial and lysosomal dysfunction in Parkinson's disease. Science, 357(6357):1255-1261
- Song, P, Peng, W., Sauve V., Fakih R., Xie Z., Ysselstein, Y, Krainc, T, Wong, YC, Mencacci N. Savas J.N., Surmeier D.J., Gehring K. and Krainc, D: Parkinson's disease linked parkin mutation disrupts recycling of synaptic vesicles in human dopaminergic neurons. Neuron, 2023
- Burbulla, L., Jeon, S., Zheng, J, Song, P, Silverman, R.B. and Krainc, D.(2019) Direct targeting of wild type glucocerebrosidase improves pathogenic phenotypes in multiple forms of Parkinson's disease. Science Translational Medicine, 16; 11(514)
- Ysselstein, D., Nguyen, M., Young, T, Severino, A., Schwake, M., Merchant, K., Krainc, D. LRRK2 kinase activity regulates lysosomal glucocerebrosidase in Parkinson's Disease pathogenesis. Nature Communications, 2019
- Jeong, H., Cohen, D.E., Cui, L., Supinski, A., Bordone, L., Guarente, L.P., and Krainc, D. (2011) Sirt1 mediates neuroprotection from mutant huntingtin by activation of TORC1 and CREB transcriptional pathway. Nature Medicine, 18(1):159-65.
- Mazzulli, J.R., Sun, Y., Knight, A.L., McLean, P.J., Caldwell, G, Sidransky, E, Grabowski, G.A. and Krainc, D. (2011) Gaucher disease glucocerebrosidase and alpha-synuclein form a bidirectional pathogenic loop in synucleinopathies. Cell, 146(1):37-52.
- Jeong H., Then F., Mazzulli JR., Melia, T. Savas J., Voisine C., Tanese, N., Hart C.A., Yamamoto A. and Krainc D. (2009) Acetylation targets mutant huntingtin to autophagosomes for degradation. Cell, 137(1):60-72.
- Cui L., Jeong H., Borovecki F. Parkhurst C., Tanese, N. and Krainc D. (2006) Transcriptional Repression of PGC-1alpha by Mutant Huntingtin Leads to Mitochondrial Dysfunction and Neurodegeneration. Cell, 126, 59-69.
- Zhai, Jeong H., Cui L, Krainc D, and Tjian R. (2005). In vitro Analysis of Huntingtin Mediated Transcriptional Repression Reveals Novel Target and Mechanism, Cell, 123, 1241-53.
- Dunah A.W., Jeong H., Griffin A., Kim M.J., Standaert D.G., Hersch S.M., Mouradian M.M., Young A.B., Tanese N., and Krainc D.(2002) Sp1 and TAF130 transcriptional activity disrupted in early Huntington's Disease. Science, 296(5576):2238-43.
