= Stephan A. Mayer =

American neurologist and critical care physician

Stephan A. Mayer is an American neurologist and critical care physician who currently serves as Director of Neurocritical Care and Emergency Neurology Services for the Westchester Medical Center Health System. Mayer is most noted for his research in subarachnoid and intracerebral hemorrhage, acute ischemic stroke, cardiac arrest, coma, status epilepticus, brain multimodality monitoring, therapeutic temperature modulation, and outcomes after severe brain injury. He has gained media attention for popularizing the concept that physicians have historically underestimated the brain’s resilience and capacity for recovery. He has authored over 400 original research publications, 200 chapters and review articles, and 370 abstracts.

== Research and career ==
Mayer originated the concept of ultra-early hemostatic therapy for intracerebral hemorrhage (ICH), and served as principal investigator of a multinational multicenter testing program evaluating recombinant factor VIIa for this indication.

Mayer predominantly uses invasive brain multimodality monitoring to guide therapy and increase situational awareness in the treatment of coma. Other contributions to the field of neurocritical care that Mayer and colleagues have introduced include the Bedside Shivering Assessment Scale and the Columbia Anti-Shivering Protocol, both of which are used to facilitate therapeutic temperature modulation throughout the world; the Modified Fisher Scale, the most widely-used scale to assess vasospasm risk after subarachnoid hemorrhage; and the concept of “CTA-for-All” for stroke imaging, to increase the likelihood of successful endovascular reperfusion.

Mayer's work in helping victims of severe brain injury has been featured in two books, Back from the Brink by Edward Sylvester and Cheating Death by CNN medical correspondent Sanjay Gupta.

== Honors ==
- 2005 – Distinguished Lecturer Award, Zeenat Qureshi Stroke Research Center, University of Medicine & Dentistry of New Jersey
- 2006 – Elected as Fellow of the American College of Critical Care Medicine (FCCM)
- 2014 –Lifesaver Award, American Heart Association, New York City Chapter
- 2019– First Leon Prockop Distinguished Lecture in Neurology, University of South Florida, Tampa, FL
- 2019. – Elected as Fellow of the Neurocritical Care Society (FNCS)
- 2020 – Drs. Michael E. Cohen and Patricia K. Duffner Annual Lecture in Neurology, University of Buffalo, Buffalo, NY

== Books edited or co-edited ==
- Merritt’s Neurology, 14th Edition. (co-edited)
- On Call: Neurology, 4th Edition.(edited)
- Mount Sinai Expert Guides: Critical Care.(co-edited)
- Neuroprotection in Neurocritical Care and Perioperative Medicine.(co-edited)
- New Insights in Intracerebral Haemorrhage.<(co-edited)
- Intracerebral Haemorrhage.(co-edited)
- Therapeutic Hypothermia.(co-edited)

== Publications ==
- Stephan A Mayer, Nikolai C Brun, Kamilla Begtrup, Joseph Broderick, Stephen Davis, Michael N Diringer, Brett E Skolnick, Thorsten Steiner. "Recombinant activated factor VII for acute intracerebral hemorrhage".
- Stephan A Mayer, Nikolai C Brun, Kamilla Begtrup, Joseph Broderick, Stephen Davis, Michael N Diringer, Brett E Skolnick, and Thorsten Steiner. "Efficacy and safety of recombinant activated factor VII for acute intracerebral hemorrhage".
- Stephan A Mayer, Jan Claassen, Johnny Lokin, Felicia Mendelsohn, Lyle J Dennis, and Brian-Fred Fitzsimmons. "Refractory status epilepticus: frequency, risk factors, and impact on outcome".
- Stephan A Mayer, Angela Lignelli, Matthew E Fink, Deborah B Kessler, Carole E Thomas, Rupendra Swarup, Ronald L Van Heertum. "Perilesional blood flow and edema formation in acute intracerebral hemorrhage: a SPECT study".
- Stephan A Mayer, and Fred Rincon. "Treatment of intracerebral haemorrhage".
- Stephan A. Mayer. “Ultra-early hemostatic therapy for intracerebral hemorrhage.
- Stephan A Mayer, Nikolai C Brun, Kamilla Begtrup, Joseph Broderick, Stephen Davis, Michael N Diringer, Brett E Skolnick, Thorsten Steiner. "Recombinant activated factor VII for acute intracerebral hemorrhage".
- Stephan A, Mayer SA, Tanuwong Viarasilpa, Nicha Panyavachiraporn, Megan Brady, Dawn Scozzai, Marilyn Van Harn, Daniel Miller, Angelos Katramados, Hebah Hefzy, Shaneela Malik, Horia Marin H, Max Kole, Alex B. Chebl, Christopher Lewandowski, Panos Mitsias., CTA-for-All: Impact of emergency computed tomographic angiography for all stroke patients presenting within 24 hours of onset.
