= Pearce Bailey =

American neurologist and psychiatrist

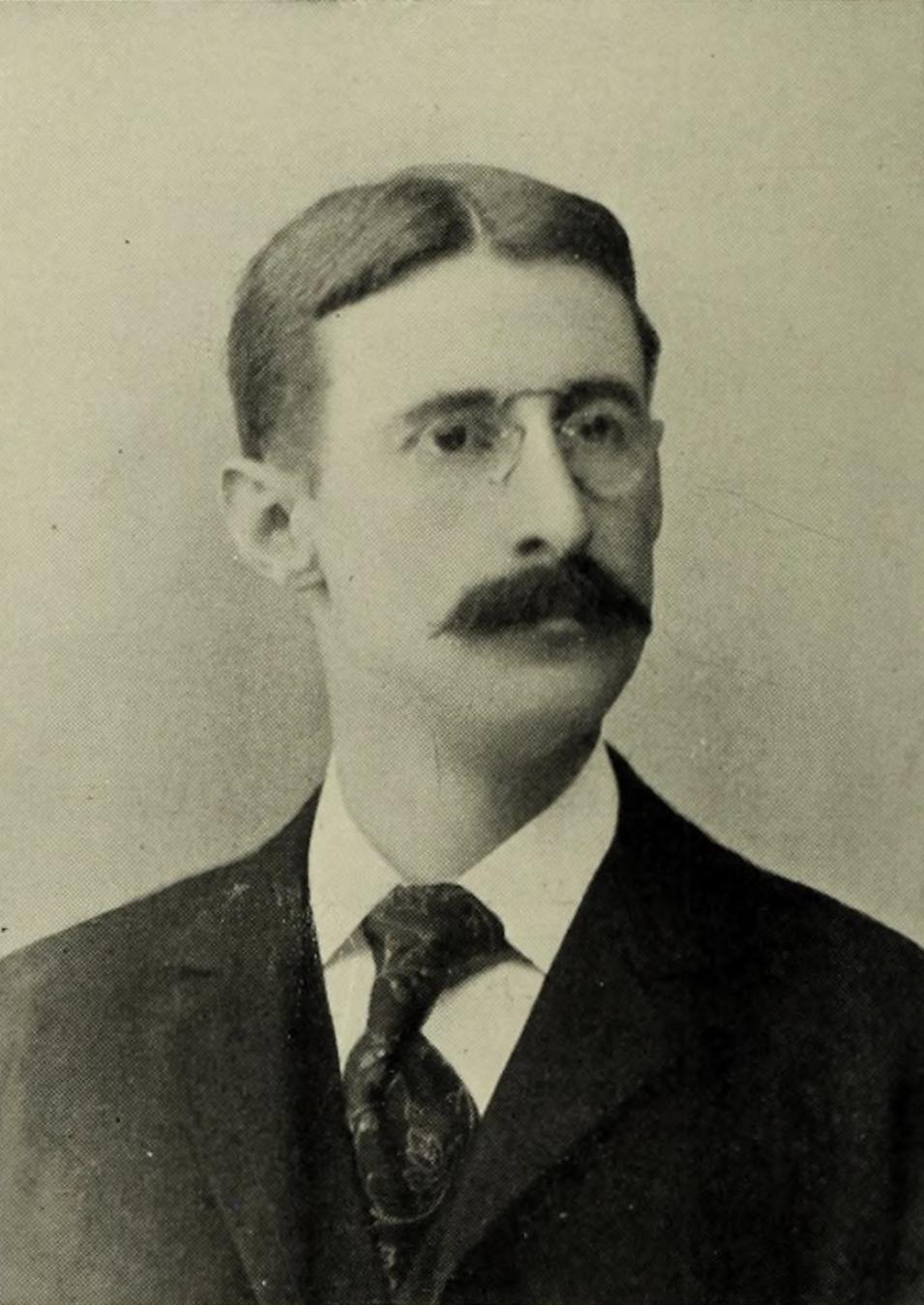
- Born: July 12, 1865; New York City, New York, U.S.
- Died: 1922 (aged 56–57)
- Education: Princeton University, A.B. (1886); Columbia University, M.D. (1889)
- Founded: Neurological Institute of New York

Pearce Bailey (July 12, 1865 – 1922) was an American neurologist and psychiatrist. Bailey was born July 12, 1865, in New York City to William E. Bailey and Harriet B. Pearce. He received a Bachelor of Arts degree from Princeton University in 1886 and a Master of Arts degree from Columbia University in 1889. He became a consultant in several New York hospitals and with Joseph Collins, Charles Elsberg, and Joseph Fraenkel, founded the Neurological Institute of New York. He was assistant in pathology at Columbia University from 1895 to 1897 and was appointed assistant in neurology in 1892. On the entry of the United States into World War I, he was appointed chief of the division of neurology and psychiatry in the United States army with the rank of colonel. He perfected a system for weeding out "mental defectives" which is said to have been used as a model by the Allies. His major literary efforts comprised a translation of Golobievski's Atlas and Epitome of Diseases Caused by Accident (1900) and a monograph Accident and Injury; Relation to the Nervous System (1906), which was later expanded into Diseases of the Nervous System Resulting from Accident and Injury, a valuable work for the medical world. At the time of his death, Bailey was chairman of the New York State Committee for Mental Defectives.
