= Charles Karsner Mills =

American neurologist and academic (1845–1930)

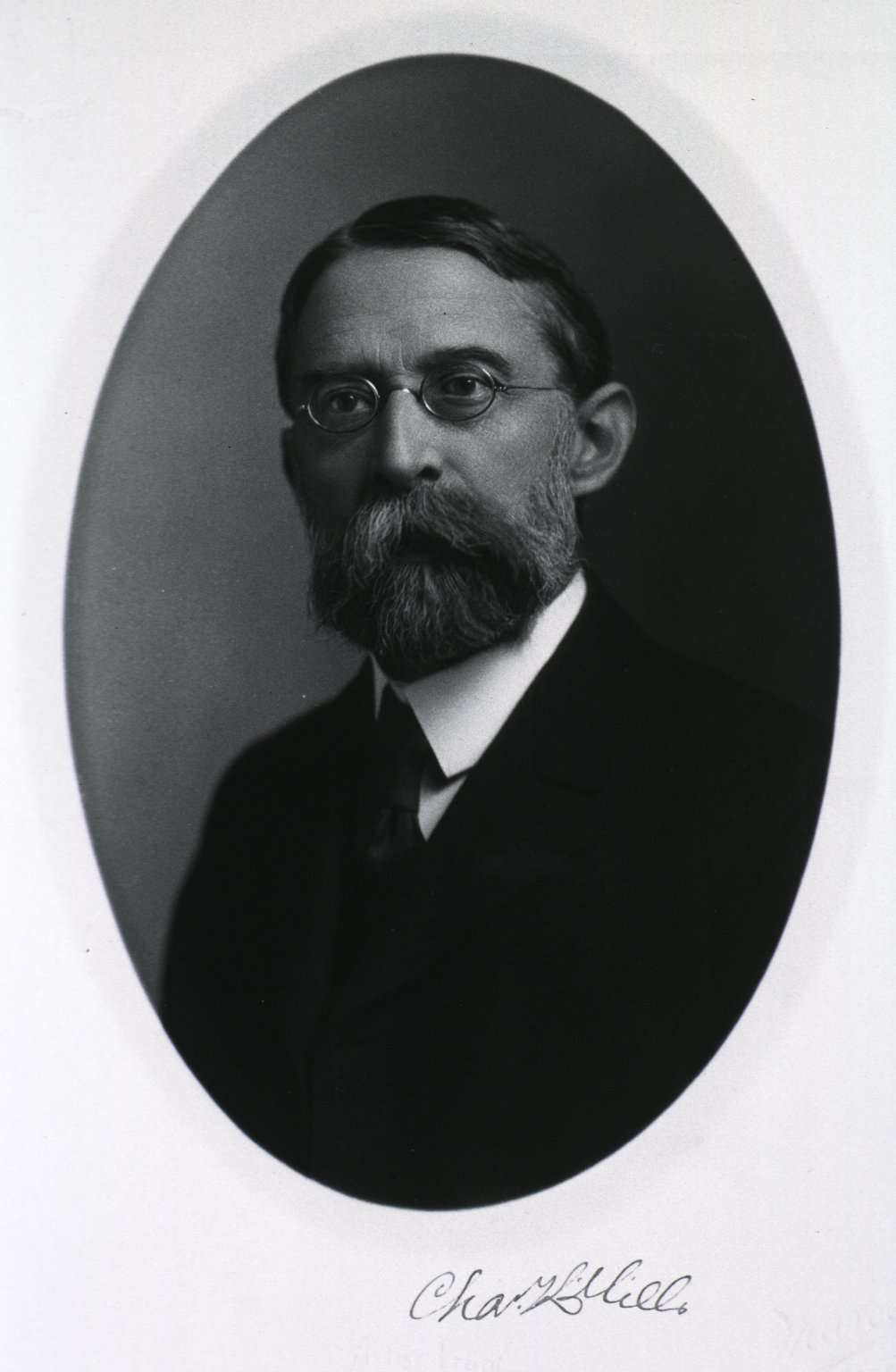
- Born: December 4, 1845; Philadelphia, Pennsylvania, U.S.
- Died: May 28, 1931 (aged 85)
- Burial place: Laurel Hill Cemetery, Philadelphia, Pennsylvania, U.S.
- Occupations: Physician, professor, author
- Spouse: Clara Elizabeth Peale

Charles Karsner Mills, M.D. (December 4, 1845 – May 28, 1931) was an American physician and a pioneer in neurology. He founded the first neurology department in a general hospital in the United States at the Philadelphia General Hospital in 1877 and served as chief of neurology at the Hospital of the University of Pennsylvania. He was a professor of neurology at the University of Pennsylvania from 1877 to 1915. He founded the Philadelphia Polyclinic and taught there as professor of diseases of the mind and nervous system from 1883 to 1898. He led major reforms to psychiatric hospitals in the Philadelphia area including the closing of the Blockley Almshouse and the construction of the Philadelphia General Hospital and Byberry Hospital for Mental Diseases. He published over 300 scientific papers on neurology topics including cerebral localization, electrotherapeutics, aphasias and the effects of tumors in the central nervous system. In 1900, he first described a case of ascending paralysis, a rare motor neuron condition that has become known as Mills' syndrome.

== Early life and education ==
Mills was born on December 4, 1845, in Philadelphia, Pennsylvania, to James and Lavinia Ann (Fitzgerald) Mills. He attended Central High School but left school early to serve as a private in the 8th regiment of Pennsylvania militia in 1862 and 1863 during the American Civil War. He was later commissioned 1st corporal in the 33rd regiment and fought against the Army of Northern Virginia as they retreated from the Battle of Gettysburg. He returned to Central High School and graduated in 1864.

He worked as a teacher for several years and graduated from the University of Pennsylvania Medical School in 1869. He also received a Ph.D. degree in 1871. In 1916, the University of Pennsylvania awarded him an honorary LLD when he became Emeritus professor of neurology.

== Career ==
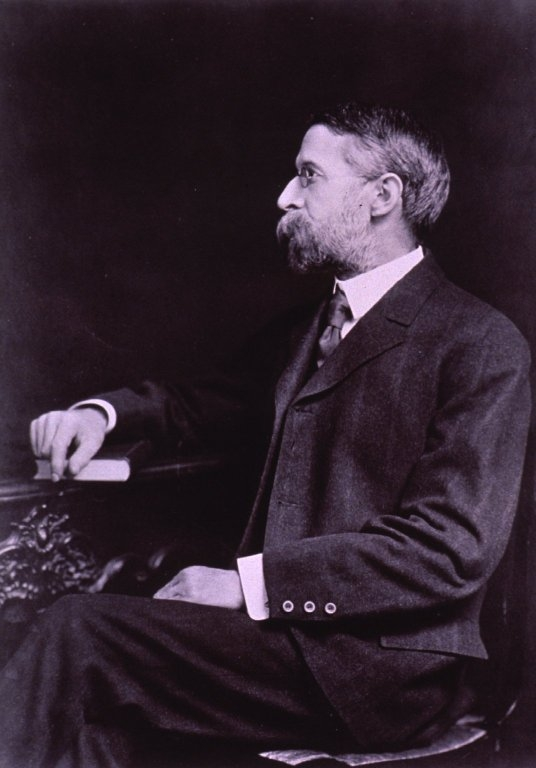
Seated portrait of Charles Karsner Mills from Images of the History of Medicine

Mills worked as a general practitioner for several years before turning his focus to nervous and mental diseases. The only other neurologist at the time was Silas Weir Mitchell whose work on Civil War injuries created the framework for the specialty of neurology. In 1877, Mills founded the first neurology department in a general hospital in the United States at the Philadelphia General Hospital. In 1883, he became professor of mind and nervous disorders at the University of Pennsylvania.

Mills was invited to participate in the high profile autopsy of Charles J. Guiteau, who was hanged for the 1882 assassination of President James A. Garfield. Mills used the findings from the autopsy to support his theories about the neurology of the criminally insane.

He lectured on medical topics at the Wagner Free Institute of Science, the Franklin Institute, Jefferson Medical College and the Woman's Medical College of Pennsylvania. He founded the Philadelphia Polyclinic and taught there as professor of diseases of the mind and nervous system from 1883 to 1898. In 1914, he helped to organize the Philadelphia Post-graduate School of Neurology, and became a clinical professor in 1919. In 1917, he trained the U.S. Medical Reserve Corps on the treatment of nervous disorders arising from World War I battles.

His research focused on cerebral localization and described how certain sections of the brain were dedicated to motor and sensory activities. He was interested in language disorders and his work led to further understanding of aphasias. He studied the use of electrotherapeutics for the treatment of various conditions. He studied the effects of tumors in the cerebral cortex, the cerebellum and the spinal cord. He described the first case of blockage of the superior cerebellar artery. He helped pioneer neurosurgery and studied diseases such as athetosis, hysteria, insanity, neuritis, myotonia and polio. Mills published over 300 scientific papers on neurology. Many of his articles include case descriptions with autopsies and pathological findings. He described for the first time a case of ascending paralysis in 1900, and a case of descending paralysis in 1906. The rare motor neuron disease has come to be known as Mills' Syndrome.

Mills held numerous positions in scientific and medical associations. He was president of the Northern Medical Association of Philadelphia in 1876. He founded the Philadelphia Neurological Society in 1884 and served as president in 1893, 1896, and 1914. He founded the Philadelphia County Medical Society in 1906. He was president of the American Neurological Association in 1886 and 1924. He was a member of the American Medico Psychological Association, the College of Physicians of Philadelphia, the Historical Society of Pennsylvania, and the Academy of Natural Sciences of Philadelphia.

Mills served on multiple hospital advisory boards and led major reforms to psychiatric hospitals in the Philadelphia area including the closing of the Blockley Almshouse and the creation of new hospitals including Philadelphia General Hospital and the Byberry Hospital for Mental Diseases. He served on the consulting staff to multiple institutions including the Orthopedic Hospital and Infirmary for Nervous Diseases, Howard Hospital, Misericordia Hospital, St. Timothy's and the West Philadelphia Hospital for Women.

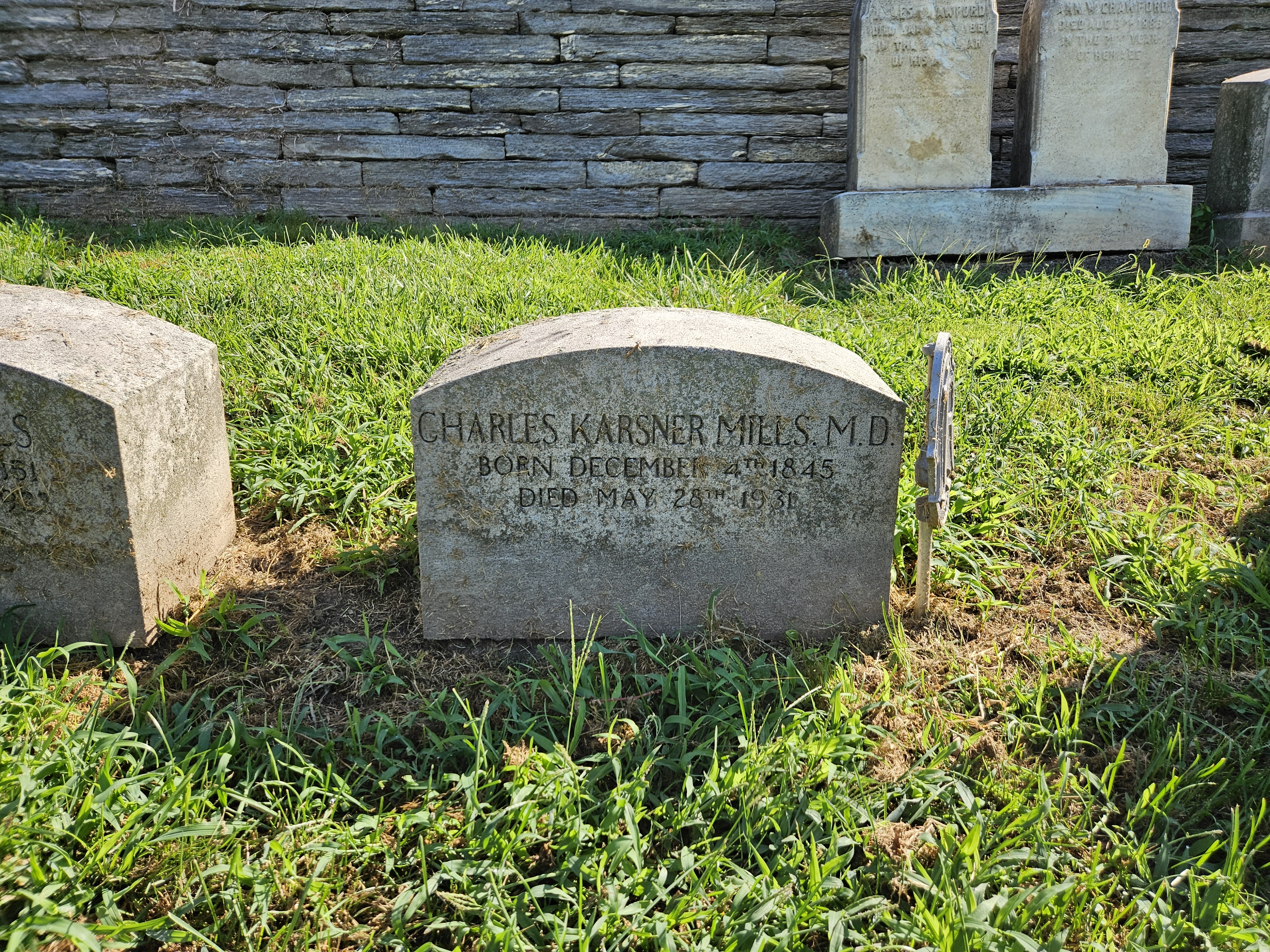
Charles Karsner Mills' grave in Laurel Hill Cemetery

He was a published poet with emphasis on his childhood home, the Schuykill Falls section of Philadelphia. His eyesight began to decline as he aged and he was eventually completely blind. He died on May 28, 1931 and was interred at Laurel Hill Cemetery in Philadelphia.

== Personal life ==
He married Clara Elizabeth Peale in 1878 and together they had four children.

== Publications ==
- The Schuykill, Philadelphia: Jno. A. Haddock, 1876
- First Lessons in Physiology and Hygiene, Philadelphia: Eldredge & Brother, 1883
- Mental Over-work and Premature Disease Among Public and Professional Men, Washington: Smithsonian Institution, January, 1885
- Benjamin Rush and American Psychiatry, The Medico-Legal Journal 4(3) (Dec. 8, 1886): 238-273.
- The Nervous System and its Diseases: A Practical Treatise on Neurology for the use of Physicians and Students Philadelphia: J.B. Lippincott Company, 1898
- Aphasia and the Cerebral Zone of Speech, American Journal of the Medical-Sciences, January 1904
- The Nursing and Care of the Nervous and the Insane Philadelphia: J.B. Lippincott Company, 1905
- Tumors of the Cerebellum. New York: A.R. Elliott Publishing Company, 1905
- Psychotherapy: Its Scope and Limitations, Monthly Cyclopaedia and Medical Bulletin, July 1908
- The Philadelphia Almshouse and the Philadelphia Hospital From 1854 to 1908, Philadelphia: Founders' Week Memorial Volume, 1908
- Concerning Cerebral Morphology in its Relation to Cerebral Localization, Journal of Nervous & Mental Disease 42(6) (June 1915): 322-357
- Historical Notes on the Medical School of the University of Pennsylvania, With Some Discussion of Recent Problems in Medical Teaching, New York Medical Journal, April 21, 1917
