= Lewis Rowland =

American neurologist

Lewis Phillip "Bud" Rowland (August 3, 1925 – March 16, 2017) was an American neurologist. He served as president of the American Neurological Association (1980–81) and the American Academy of Neurology (1989–91). He was editor of the journal Neurology from 1977 to 1987 and of the newspaper Neurology Today from 2000 to 2009. He authored over 500 scientific articles, with a research emphasis on amyotrophic lateral sclerosis (ALS; also known as Lou Gehrig's disease), and muscular dystrophy. He was chair of the neurology department at Columbia University for 25 years, where he established the H. Houston Merritt Clinical Research Center for Muscular Dystrophy and Related Diseases as well as the Eleanor and Lou Gehrig ALS Center.

Rowland was born Lewis Phillip Rosenthal in Brooklyn, New York, the eldest child of Cecile Coles and Henry A. Rosenthal. His father changed the family name to Rowland when Lewis was a teenager, as colleges placed restrictions on the number of Jewish students at the time. Roland attended Brooklyn's Erasmus Hall High School before entering Yale University where he earned his bachelor's degree in 1945 and MD in 1948.
