= Sparkle Moore =

American rockabilly singer (born 1936)

- Born: Barbara Morgan; November 6, 1936 (age 89)
- Origin: Omaha, Nebraska, United States
- Genres: Rockabilly
- Years active: 1956–1957; 2010–present
- Label: Fraternity
- Website: www.sparklemoore.net

Sparkle Moore (born Barbara Morgan on November 6, 1936 in Omaha, Nebraska, United States) is an American rockabilly singer who was influential as a pioneer of female rockabilly. Her name arose because of her similarity to Sparkle Plenty, a supporting character in the Dick Tracy comic strip. Sparkle dressed in men's clothing, often including leather, and sported an Elvis-influenced pompadour.

In 1956, she toured with Gene Vincent and was scheduled to perform on the Grand Ole Opry, which was subsequently cancelled due to illness. In 1957, Sparkle retired from music to concentrate on raising a family.

In 2010, she released a 22 track CD of home recordings Spark-A-Billy.

== Discography ==
=== Original releases ===
- Fraternity F-751 – November 17, 1956 – "Rock-A-Bop" / "Skull And Cross Bones"
- Fraternity F-766 – May 1957 – "Killer" / "Tiger"
- Sparkle Moore – 2010 – Spark-A-Billy
- Unissued tracks – "Flower Of My Heart", "Killer" [alt. vers.], "Tiger" [alt. vers.]

=== Compilation reissues ===
- Ace CDCHD 1016 (CD) : Good Girls Gone Bad (Wild, Weird, And Wanted)
- Ace CDCHD 316 (CD) : All American Rock 'N' Roll From Fraternity Records
- Ace CDCHD 815 (CD) : Them Rockabilly Cats
- Ace CDCHD 822 (CD) : All American Rock 'N' Roll: The Fraternity Story, Vol. 2
- Crown 56- 200 (LP) : Rock, Rock, Rock, Vol. 2
- Eagle EA-R 90207 (CD) : Cool Off Baby
- Folkline 274- 162 (CD) : Rockabilly Kittens, Vol. 2
- Pompadour DA 002 (10-in. LP) : Man's Ruin: Skin-Tone Rock 'N' Roll
- Rounder 1031 (LP) : Wild, Wild Young Women
- Supersonic LP-FV 1172 (LP) : Hot Boppin' Girls, Vol. 4
- Unlimited Prod. ULP 1006 (LP) : Let's Have A Ball
