= Georg Schaltenbrand =

German neurologist

Georges Schaltenbrand
- Born: 26 November 1897; Oberhausen, German Empire
- Died: 24 October 1979 (aged 81); Würzburg, West Germany
- Scientific career
- Fields: neurologist

Georges Schaltenbrand (26 November 1897 – 24 October 1979 ) was a German neurologist known for his work on the organization and diagnostics of the motor system, to the physiology and pathology of the cerebrospinal fluid, and to multiple sclerosis. He coauthored an influential textbook and atlas on stereotaxy and he also published some unethical experiments performed in Nazi Germany.
