= Ludo van Bogaert =

Belgium neuropathologist (1897–1989)

- Born: Ludovicus (Ludo) Maria Carolus Gommarus van Bogaert; 25 May 1897; Antwerp, Belgium
- Died: 4 March 1989 (aged 91); Antwerp, Belgium
- Education: Free University of Brussels
- Scientific career
- Fields: Neurology, Neuropathology

Ludo van Bogaert was a Belgian neurologist and neuropathologist. He was one of the founders of the World Federation of Neurology. Van Bogaert encephalitis (Subacute sclerosing leucoencephalitis), genetic disorder Nyssen-van Bogaert syndrome, Divry van Bogaert Syndrome, a familial juvenile-onset disorder, Van Bogaert-Hozay syndrome, a familial form of acroosteolysis, and genetic disorder Van Bogaert-Scherer-Epstein syndrome are named after him.

== Biography ==
Ludovicus (Ludo) Maria Carolus Gommarus van Bogaert was born on 25 May 1897, into an old Belgian family with Flemish roots and Catholic beliefs, in Antwerp in Belgium. His father and younger brother Adalbert were both physicians.

When World War I broke out, Bogart wanted to join the Belgian army, but was not selected for military service due to his young age. He then choose to study a preparatory courses in medicine.

After studying in Notre-Dame College in Antwerp, Bogaert went to Utrecht University in Netherlands to study medicine in 1914 but joined the Belgian army in 1916. During his service, he suffered a spinal injury and was wounded two times. After the war, in 1919, Bogaert joined the Faculté de Médecine at Free University of Brussels (present-day Université libre de Bruxelles) and completed his medical degree in 1922.

A spinal injury that happened in September 1918, due to a bullet that penetrated his right lung, which also caused a temporary paralysis of both legs, had sparked his interest in neurology, so after graduation he decided to specialise in neurology and neuropathology and gone to Paris to study under Pierre Marie at the Pitié-Salpêtrière Hospital and under Marcel Labbé at the Hôpital de la Charité. After training, he returned to his homeland and first became an assistant at St. Elizabeth Hospital, then at Stuyvenberg Hospital Internal Medicine department where he worked as an additional doctor first and later head of the department. In 1933, he was appointed as head of the Department of Internal Medicine and Neurology at the Bunge Research Institute, founded in memory of Edouard Bunge. Bogaert shifted his laboratory in Stuyvenberg Hospital to Bunge Institute even before its official inauguration, but, when World war II started it returned temporarily to Stuyvenberg Hospital.

He died on 4 March 1989 in Antwerp, after suffering a hip fracture.

== Contributions ==
Ludo van Bogaert is remembered for his 753 scientific publications, with 175 as first author, lectures at Belgian and foreign universities and international congresses, and the more than 300 specialists he trained at the Bunge Institute (opened in 1934) and the Born-Bunge Foundation.

Initially, his main interests were clinical neurology and its neuropathological interpretation, but he realized that other disciplines in the field of medicine needed to be connected with it and took the initiative to develop new fields such as neurosurgery, neurophysiology, neuro-radiology, and neurochemistry. The Bunge Institute, which he founded with the support of many others, later expanded to a foundation called Born-Bunge Foundation. The neurology department started by him in the Bunge Institute was closed in 1979 and moved to Antwerp University Hospital at Edegem.

Bogaert was one of the founders of the World Federation of Neurology (WFN) in 1957 and was its president twice. He was elected foreign correspondent of the National Academy of Medicine for the medicine division on February 13, 1951, and later, elected as foreign associate on June 13, 1972.

== Awards ==
Bogaert received the first Humanitas Prize of the province of Antwerp in 1980 for "his important contribution as a physician and scientific researcher to the improvement of health care in the Antwerp region and to meeting the needs of countless sick people".

== Legacy ==
Subacute sclerosing leucoencephalitis, a progressive brain disorder leading to vision loss, cognitive impairment and other problems, caused by a mutant measles virus, is also known as Van Bogaert disease or Van Bogaert encephalitis, in his honor. Nyssen-van Bogaert Syndrome, a genetic disorder that causes blindness, deafness and developmental delay, is named after him and another Belgian neurologist Rene Nyssen. Divry van Bogaert Syndrome (DBS) received its name from Bogaert and another Belgian neurologist Paul Divry (1889–1967). Van Bogaert-Hozay syndrome is named after Bogaert and French neurologist Jean Hozay. Van Bogaert-Scherer-Epstein syndrome is also named after him.
