= Barbara Spofford Morgan =

American philosopher

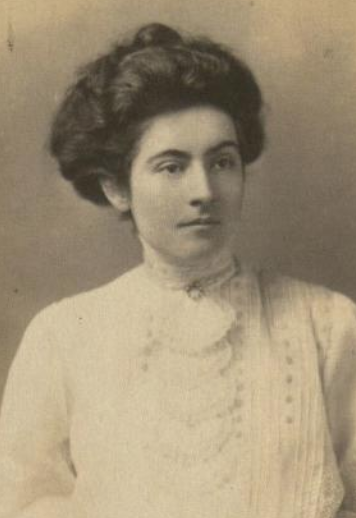
- Barbara Spofford (later Morgan), from the 1909 yearbook of Bryn Mawr College
- Born: Barbara Spofford; July 15, 1887; New York City, New York, US
- Died: May 1, 1971 (aged 83); Canaan, Connecticut, US
- Education: Miss Spence's School, Wycombe Abbey School, Darmstadt University, Bryn Mawr College, Friedrich Wilhelm University
- Occupations: educator, essayist, specialist in mental testing
- Spouse: Shepard Ashman Morgan (m. 1912; died 1968)
- Relatives: Ainsworth Rand Spofford
- Writing career
- Language: English

Barbara Spofford Morgan (July 15, 1887 – April 1, 1971) was an American educator, essayist on religion and a specialist in mental testing.

== Early life and education ==
Barbara Spofford was born on July 15, 1887, in New York City, the daughter of Charles Ainsworth Spofford, a director of the Northern Pacific Railway, and Ellen Boardman. They moved to Norfolk, Connecticut, to give their daughter a better environment, and in 1898, built The Alders (now known as the Manor House), a Victorian Tudor-style mansion, designed by E.K. Rossiter. Later Barbara and Shepard Morgan lived on Mountain Road, Norfolk. Spofford was the granddaughter of Ainsworth Rand Spofford, Librarian of the United States Congress from 1864 to 1897.

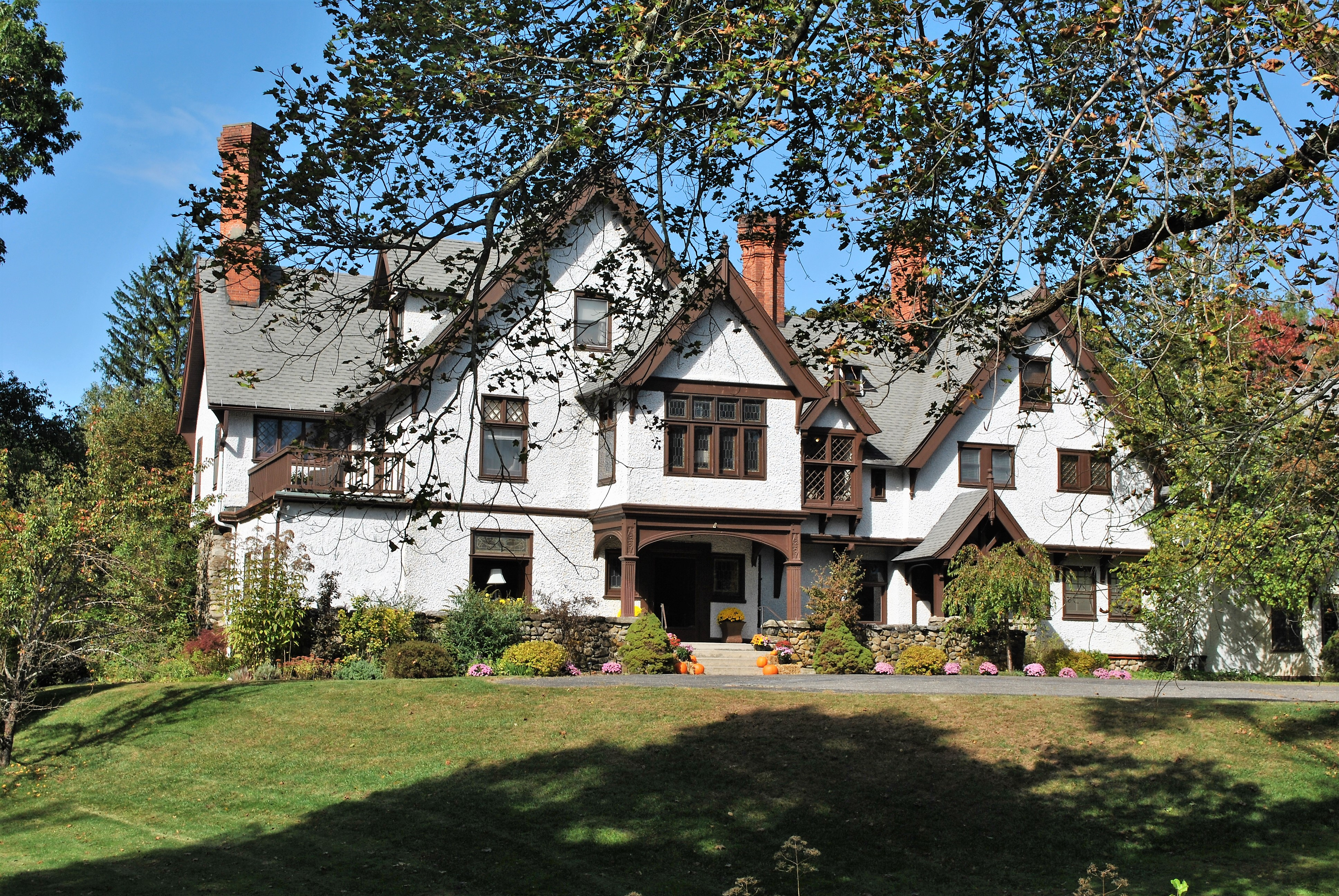
The Alders

She was educated at Miss Spence's School in New York City, and then attended Wycombe Abbey School in England where her father was working on a government commission. In 1905, she was presented at court in the presence of King Edward VII and Queen Alexandra. Morgan attended Darmstadt University in Germany and in 1909 Bryn Mawr College. After college, she made a world tour.

== Career ==
On February 20, 1912, she married Shepard Ashman Morgan (1884-1968), president of the Chase National Bank and author of The History of Parliamentary Taxation in England and Reminiscences of Shepard Ashman Morgan (1950). The Morgans were members of the Jekyll Island Club, a Southern haven for America's millionaires.

In 1926, while her husband was economic advisor and later finance director of the Office for Reparation Payments in Berlin, Germany, she enrolled at the Friedrich Wilhelm University, where she received the degree of Doctor of Philosophy in 1928, the first American woman to achieve such a distinction. Her doctoral thesis was The Individual in American Education.

Morgan was the author of The Backward Child, a Study of the Psychology and Treatment of Backwardness; A Practical Manual for Teachers and Students (1914), Friendly Shepherdess (1933), Individuality in a collective world (1935), Skeptic's search for God (1947) (reissued in 1949 as Man's restless search). She also contributed articles to The Atlantic, the North American Review, and The Baltimore Sun.

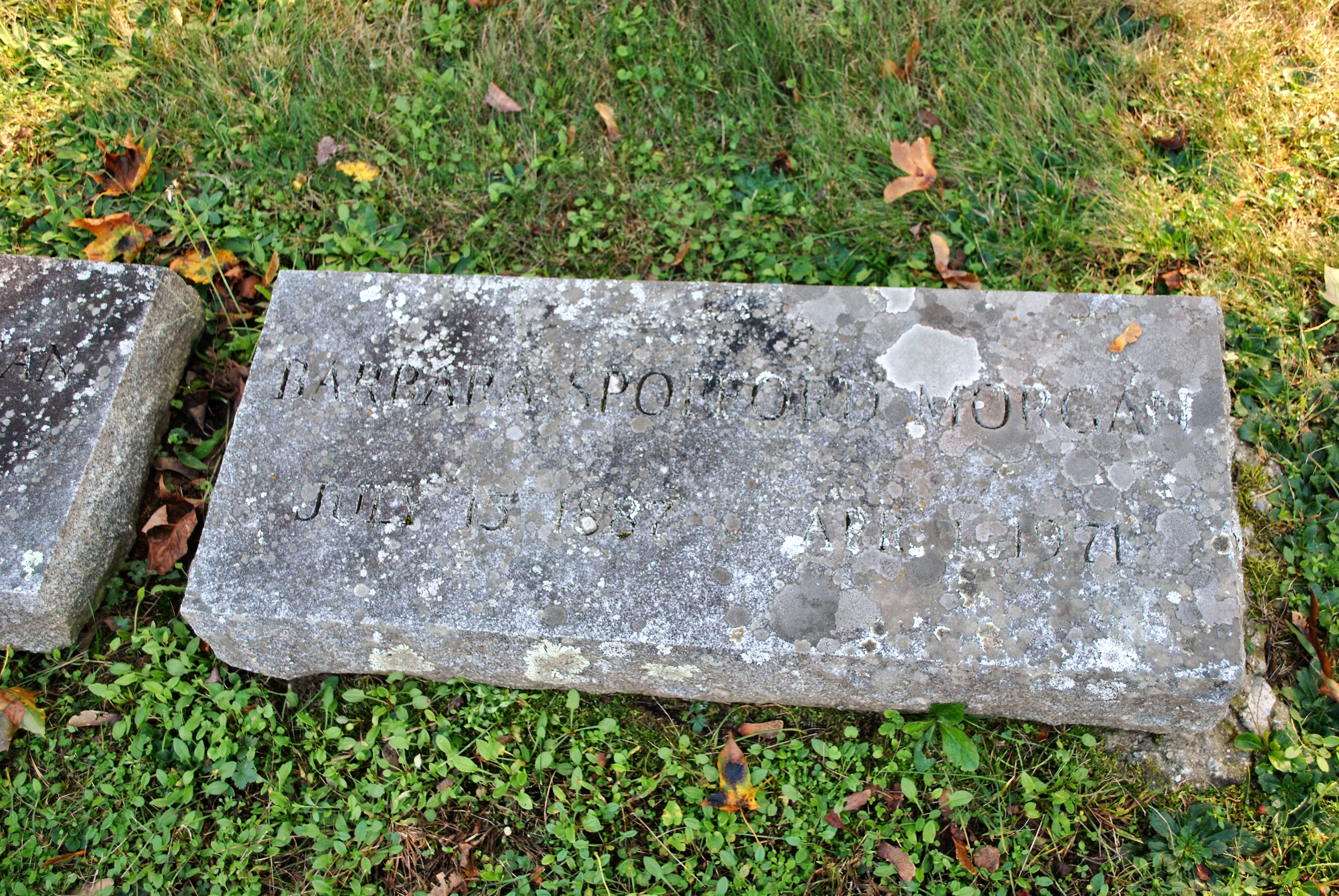
Headstone at Norfolk Center Cemetery

From 1910 to 1911, she directed the psychological clinic of the Neurological Institute of New York. In 1911, she was featured in a full-page article in The New York Times: "Teaching Backward Children Their A-B-C's by Dancing, Where ordinary methods fails, Miss Barbara Spofford resorts to a novel plan of her own to instill the alphabet into youthful minds". From 1916 to 1918 she lectured on mental testing at the New York University and from 1914 to 1920 she had a private practice in mental testing in New York City.

Morgan was governor of the Women's Municipal League, a field worker for the North American Civil League for Immigrants and an activist for the benefit of the Randalls Island Hospital for Mental Defectives. She was a trustee of the Public Education Association and a governor of the Cosmopolitan Club.

== Later years ==
In 1970, she donated The Papers of Ainsworth Rand Spofford to the Library of Congress. Morgan died on April 1, 1971, in Canaan, Connecticut.
