= Annals of Neurology =

- Discipline: Neurology
- Language: English
- Edited by: Clifford B. Saper

Publication details
- History: 1977–present
- Publisher: John Wiley & Sons (United States)
- Frequency: Monthly
- Impact factor: 7.7 (2024)

Standard abbreviations
- ISO 4: Ann. Neurol.

Indexing
- CODEN: ANNED3
- ISSN: 0364-5134 (print); 1531-8249 (web)
- LCCN: 77640836
- OCLC no.: 865244233

Links
- Journal homepage

Annals of Neurology is a peer-reviewed medical journal publishing articles of "broad interest in neurology, particularly those with high impact in understanding the mechanisms and treatment of diseases of the human nervous system." The journal has a 2020 Journal Citation Reports impact factor of 10.422, ranking it 9th out of 208 journals in the category "Clinical Neurology".

== History ==
The Annals of Neurology was launched in 1977.

== Editors ==
The following people have been editors-in-chief of the journal:

- Kenneth L. Tyler, 2022-present
- Clifford B. Saper, 2014–2021
- Steven L. Hauser, 2006–2013
- Richard T. Johnson, 1997–2005
- Robert A. Fishman, 1993–1997
- Arthur K. Asbury, 1985–1992
- Fred Plum, 1977–1984
