= MacDonald Critchley =

British neurologist (1900–1997)

- Critchley in 1969
- Born: 2 February 1900; Bristol, England
- Died: 15 October 1997 (aged 97); Nether Stowey, England
- Education: University of Bristol
- Occupation: Neurologist
- Title: President of the World Federation of Neurology
- Spouses: Edna Morris (m. 1927; died 1974); Eileen Hargreaves (m. 1974)
- Children: 2, including Julian

Macdonald Critchley CBE (2 February 1900 – 15 October 1997) was a British neurologist. He was former president of the World Federation of Neurology, and the author of over 200 published articles on neurology and 20 books, including The Parietal Lobes (1953), Aphasiology, and biographies of James Parkinson and Sir William Gowers.

== Biography ==
Macdonald Critchley was born at Bristol, son of gas collector Arthur Frank Critchley and Rosina Matilda (née White); he was educated in Bristol and received his medical degree from the University of Bristol. He served with the Royal Flying Corps. His professional life centred on King's College Hospital and National Hospital for Paralysis and Epilepsy, Queen Square "for the Paralysed and Epileptic", London. He was a Registrar in 1927, and he was appointed to the staff as a physician in the following year and later became Dean of the Institute at Queen Square. His influence spread throughout the neurological world by teaching and writings and he later became President of the World Federation of Neurology. He studied under Gordon Morgan Holmes, Samuel Alexander Kinnier Wilson and Francis Walshe.

During World War II he was a Consulting Neurologist in the Royal Navy Volunteer Reserve based at HMS Drake.

His contributions to knowledge depended not on technology, but on his power of observation and meticulous dissection of human sensibility and behaviour. The best known of his works were those on aphasia and the parietal lobes. Headache was also one of his many interests. He started a Headache Clinic at King's College Hospital and was one of the founders of the "British Migraine Trust". He delivered a paper at the "First Migraine Symposium" in 1966 on "Migraine: from Cappadocia to Queen Square", combining his clinical interest with his love of history. Critchley was a handsome and impressive figure, a superb speaker and a lifelong student of the human mind. His last book on the life and career of Hughlings Jackson, jointly with his wife Eileen, has been published posthumously.

He had married twice: firstly to Edna Morris from 1927 until her death in 1974, with whom he had two sons (one of whom being the politician Julian Critchley) and secondly Eileen Hargreaves, whom he married in 1974.

He lived at Hughlings House (named in honour of John Hughlings Jackson), at Nether Stowey in Somerset, where he died on 15 October 1997, aged 97.

In 2013 the weekly undergraduate teaching round at the National Hospital for Neurology and Neurosurgery at Queen Square was named after him - the Critchley Round.

== Associated eponyms ==
- Adie-Critchley syndrome: A syndrome of forced grasping and groping.
- Klein-Levine- Critchley syndrome: A syndrome of hypersoomnia and hyperphagia.
- Levine-Critchley syndrome: Acanthocytosis Neuroacanthocytosis with neurologic disorders detailed by Edmund Critchley not Macdonald Critchley).

== Bibliography ==
- The Parietal Lobes. London, Edward Arnold, 1953
- The Enigma of Gerstmann's Syndrome. Oxford, Brain, 1966
- Music and the Brain: Studies in the Neurology of Music (with R.A.Henson). London, Heinemann, 1977
- John Hughlings Jackson, Father of English Neurology (with Eileen A. Critchley). London, 1998
- Critchley, Macdonald (1979). The Divine Banquet of the Brain. New York, USA: Raven Press Books, Ltd. ISBN 0890043485.
- Critchley, Macdonald (1986). The Citadel of the Senses and Other Essays. New York, USA: Raven Press. ISBN 0881671053.
