= Joseph Collins (neurologist) =

American neurologist

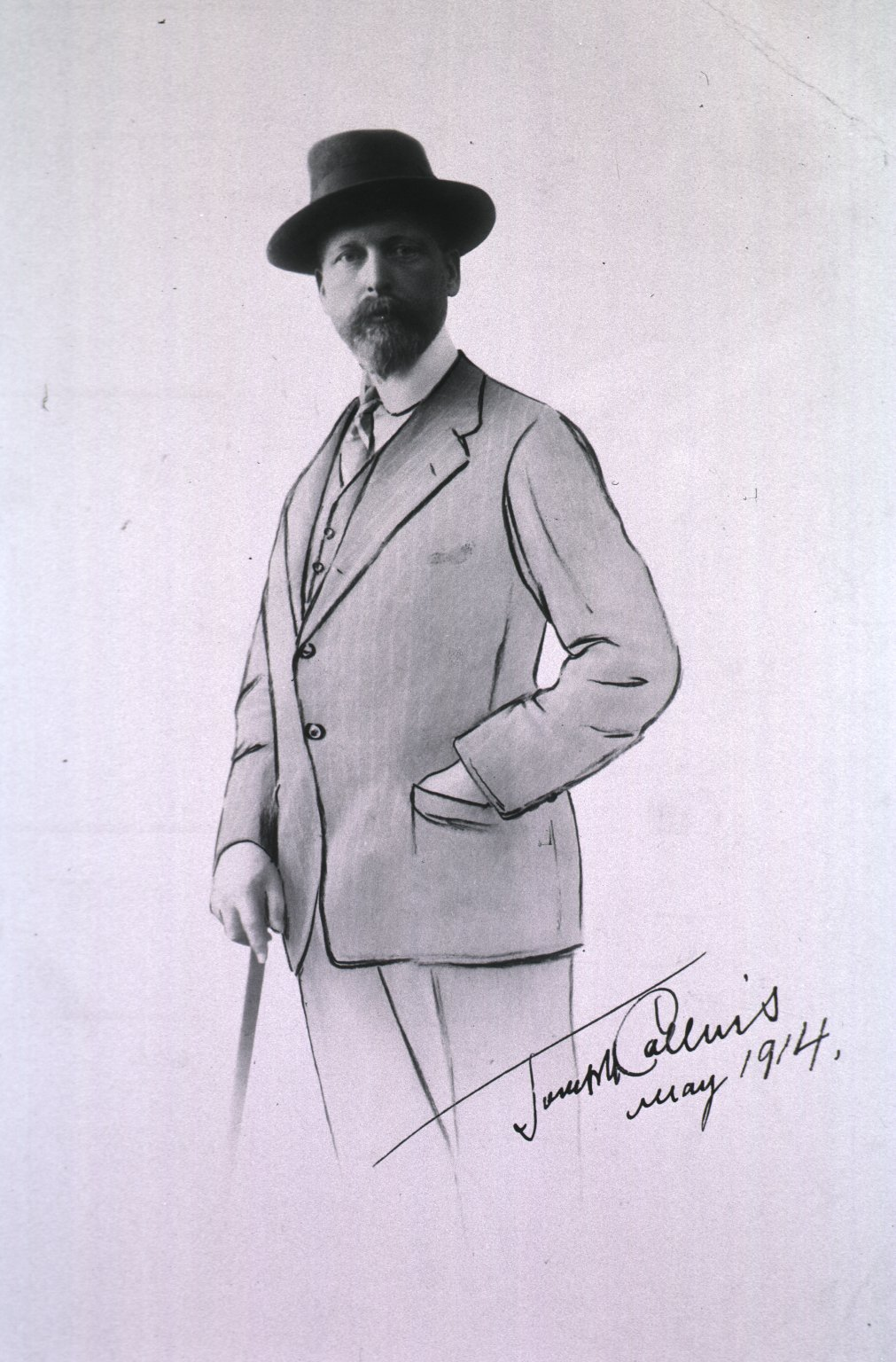
- Born: 1866; Brookfield, Connecticut
- Died: June 11, 1950 (aged 83–84)
- Education: New York University
- Scientific career
- Fields: Neurology
- Workplaces: New York Neurological Institute

Joseph Collins (September 22, 1866–June 11, 1950) was an American neurologist, born in Brookfield, Connecticut. He received the degree of M.D. from New York University in 1888, and after some years of private practice took up the specialty of neurology; in 1907, he was made a professor of that subject in the New York Post-Graduate Medical School. He was later a co-founder and visiting physician to the New York Neurological Institute.

== Bibliography ==
In addition to his attainment as a practitioner of medicine, Dr. Collins wrote books and other literature. He is notable as the man who first reviewed James Joyce's novel Ulysses for the New York Times. His major writings, medical and secular, are:

- Letters to a Neurologist (1908; second series, 1910)
- The Way with the Nerves (1911)
- Sleep and the Sleepless (1912)
- Neurological Clinics (1918)
- My Italian Year (1919)
- The Doctor Looks at Literature. New York: George H. Doran Company, 1923.
- Taking the Literary Pulse. New York: George H. Doran Company, 1924.
- The Doctor Looks at Biography. New York: George H. Doran Company, 1925.
- The Doctor Looks at Love and Life. Garden City, N.Y.: Garden City Publishing Company, 1926.
- The Doctor Looks at Marriage and Medicine. Garden City, N.Y.: Doubleday, Doran and Company, 1928.
- The Doctor Looks at Life and Death. Garden City, N.Y.: Garden City Publishing Company, 1931.
