= H. Houston Merritt =

American neurologist (1902–1979)

Hiram Houston Merritt Jr.
- Born: January 12, 1902; Wilmington, North Carolina
- Died: January 9, 1979 (aged 76); Boston, Massachusetts
- Occupation: Academic neurologist
- Known for: Discovery of the anticonvulsant properties of phenytoin

Hiram Houston Merritt Jr. (January 12, 1902, Wilmington, North Carolina – January 9, 1979, Boston, Massachusetts) was an academic neurologist. Serving as chair of the Neurological Institute of New York and Neurologist-in-Chief at NewYork-Presbyterian Hospital/Columbia University Medical Center in Manhattan's Washington Heights from 1948 to 1967, Merritt played a pivotal role in the training of numerous neurologists, with 35 of his students ascending to department chair positions in universities across the US. He also held the deanship of the Columbia University College of Physicians and Surgeons from 1958 to 1970.

Merritt's influential contributions to neurology included the discovery of the anticonvulsant properties of phenytoin (Dilantin) in 1938, alongside Tracy Putnam. This discovery marked a significant breakthrough in seizure management, as phenytoin effectively controlled seizures without the sedative effects associated with phenobarbital.

According to Goodman and Gilman's Pharmacological Basis of Therapeutics:

In contrast to the earlier accidental discovery of the antiseizure properties of potassium bromide and phenobarbital, phenytoin was the product of a search among nonsedative structural relatives of phenobarbital for agents capable of suppressing electroshock convulsions in laboratory animals.

He also was the sole author of the first five editions of Merritt's Neurology; this popular textbook is in its fourteenth edition (Louis, Mayer and Noble, 2021). His early work on the normal properties of the cerebrospinal fluid (CSF) was updated and published by one of his students, Robert Fishman, in a text that is the acknowledged standard on the topic.

Merritt was also known in his day as an expert on neurosyphilis; his 1946 monograph on the topic provided an overview of this condition, which almost disappeared from the medical eye shortly thereafter owing to the advent of penicillin.

Charles Poser, another eminent neurologist, worked under Merritt, and credited him teaching him the importance of a thorough diagnosis.

== Biography ==
He was a son of Hiram Houston Merritt Sr. (January 6, 1870 - May 9, 1945) and Dessie Ella Cline (September 23, 1872 - January 7, 1946), who were married on January 24, 1898, in Morehead Township, Guilford County, North Carolina.

In 1968, he was sent by the Department of Health to Portugal to assist local doctors after Salazar had a brain haemorrhage.

Merritt died in 1979 from complications of cerebrovascular disease and normal pressure hydrocephalus; ironically, the latter condition was a syndrome whose existence he had never fully accepted during his career. His students who were treating him in New York disagreed over the proper course of action. Eventually, he was taken to the Massachusetts General Hospital, where he died from the after-effects of a neurosurgical operation.
