= Neurological Institute of New York =

Hospital in New York, United States

Coordinates: 40.84227°N 73.94290°W

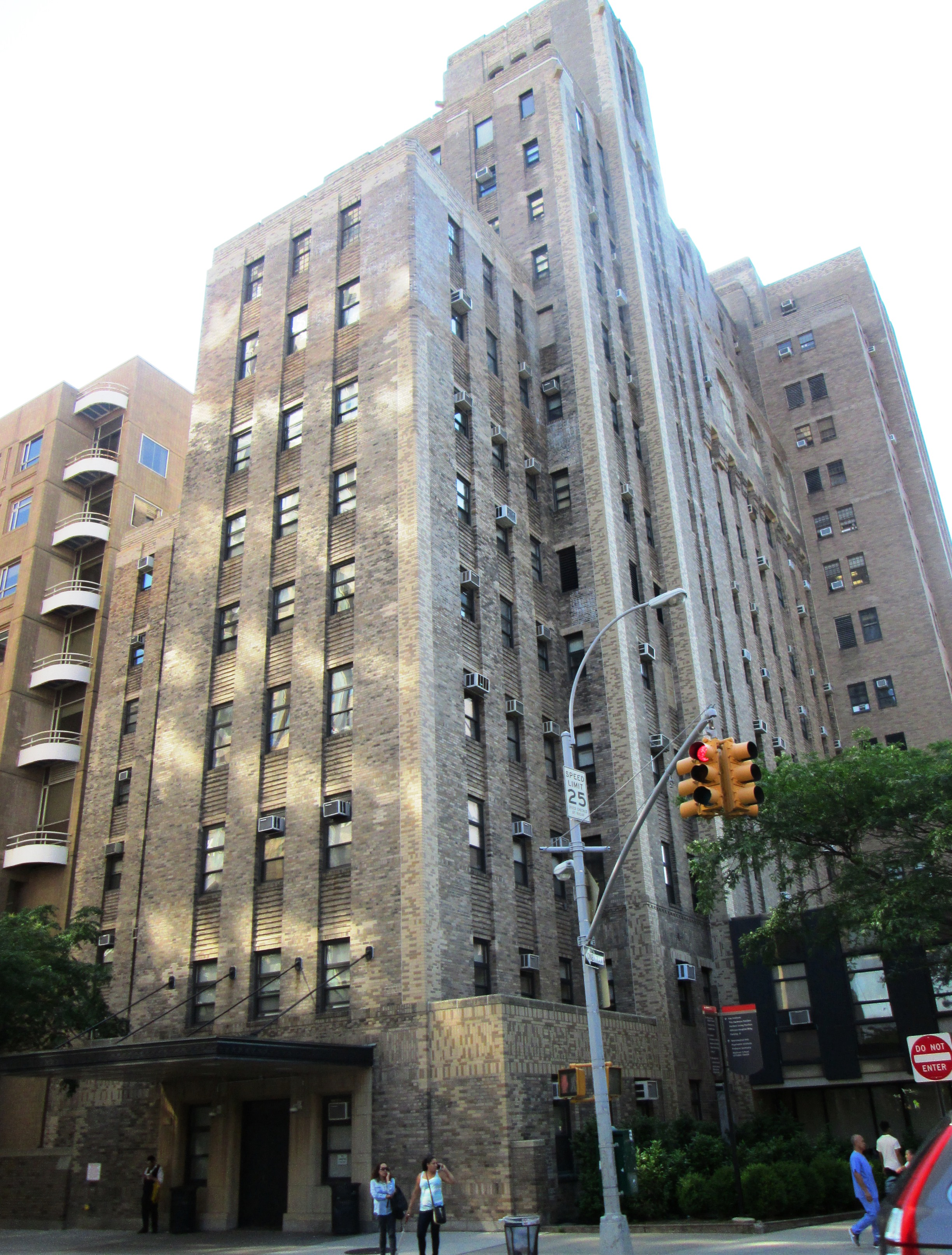
Neurological Institute of New York

The Neurological Institute of New York is an American hospital research center located at 710 West 168th Street at the corner of Fort Washington Avenue in the NewYork-Presbyterian Hospital / Columbia University Medical Center in the Washington Heights neighborhood of Manhattan, New York City.

== History ==
The institute was founded in 1909 by Joseph Collins, Charles Elsberg (Columbia University P&S neurosurgery chair from 1909 to 1937), Joseph Fraenkel, and Pearce Bailey, as the first hospital and research center in the western hemisphere devoted solely to neurological disorders. From 1910 to 1911, Barbara Spofford Morgan directed the psychological clinic.

The Neurological Institute began teaching medical students at Columbia University College of Physicians and Surgeons in 1921, became affiliated with Presbyterian Hospital – now NewYork-Presbyterian Hospital – in 1925, and merged with it in 1943. It consists of a department of academic neurology and a department of neurological surgery.

The Chair of the Department of Neurology at Columbia College of Physicians & Surgeons is simultaneously the Neurologist-in-Chief of NewYork-Presbyterian / Columbia.

- Richard P. Mayeux, MD, MSc - Current
- Timothy A. Pedley, MD, FAAN - 1998 to 2011
- Lewis P. “Bud” Rowland, MD - 1973 to 1998
- Milton Shy, MD - 1967
- H. Houston Merritt, MD - 1948 to 1967

The institute's building dates from the original incarnation of Columbia-Presbyterian campus built 1928 by philanthropist Edward Harkness and was designed by James Gamble Rogers. An addition was made in 1948, designed by Rogers & Butler.
