= Peter Weinberg =

American businessman

Peter Amory Weinberg
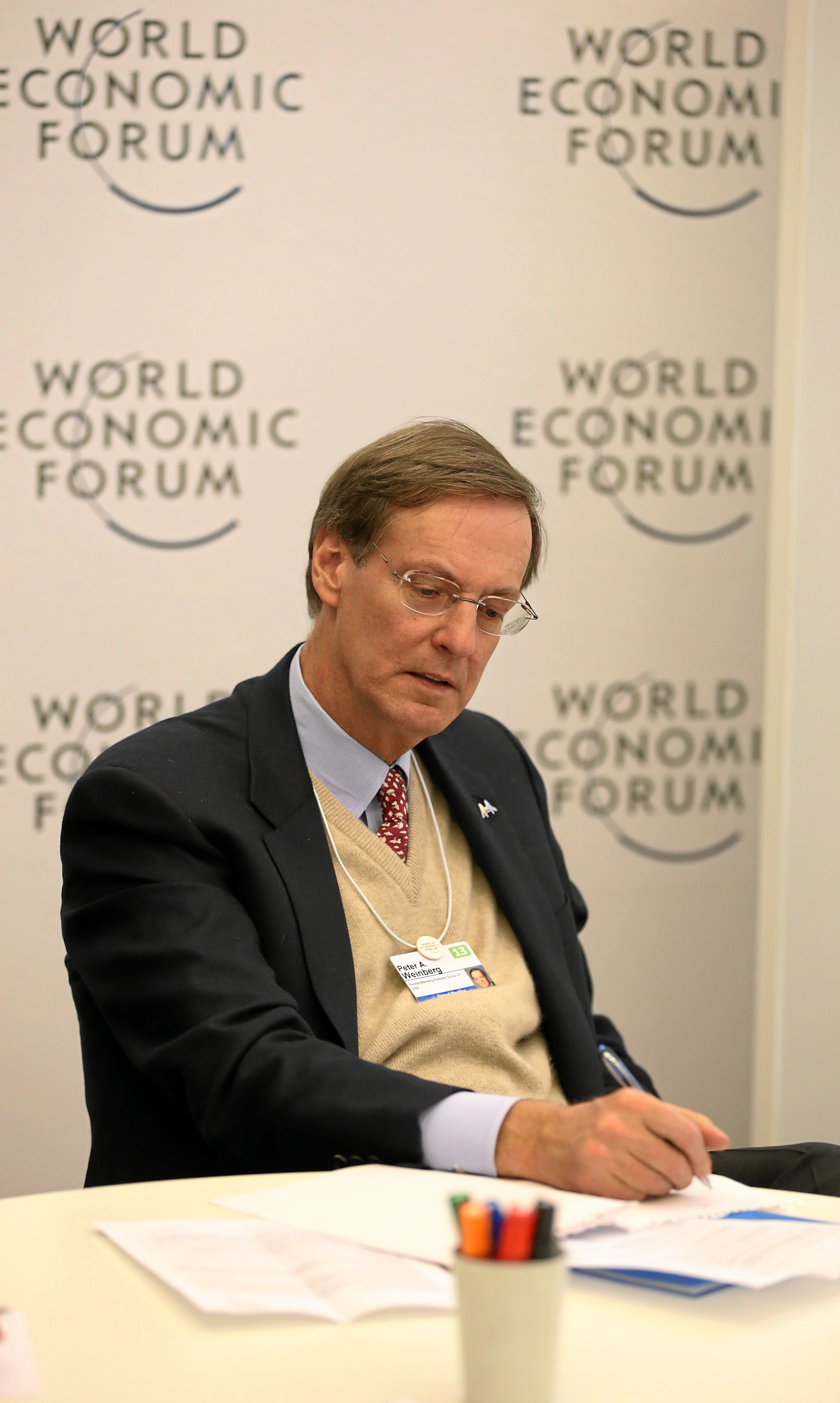
- Weinberg in 2013
- Born: July 9, 1957 (age 69); Rye, New York, US
- Education: Claremont McKenna College (BA); Harvard University (MBA)
- Occupation: Businessman
- Known for: Founding Partner, Perella Weinberg Partners
- Spouse: Deborah L. Weinberg
- Children: 3 sons

Peter Amory Weinberg (born c. 1957) is an American businessman. He spent almost twenty years of his career at Goldman Sachs before co-founding Perella Weinberg Partners with merger specialist, Joseph Perella in 2006. The firm provides M&A advisory and alternative asset management services. Weinberg is its founding partner and chairman. He previously was the chief executive officer (CEO) of the company, from February 2019 to January 2023.

== Education ==
Weinberg attended Deerfield Academy, received his undergraduate degree at Claremont McKenna College in 1979, and earned his MBA at Harvard Business School in 1983.

== Business career ==
=== Morgan Stanley ===
Weinberg started his career as an analyst at Morgan Stanley & Co in 1979, where he worked before and after attending Harvard Business School. Weinberg was with Morgan Stanley’s Corporate Finance Department from 1986 to 1988.

=== Goldman Sachs ===
He joined Goldman Sachs in 1988 and became a partner in 1992. He held a number of senior management positions at the firm. He founded the Financial Sponsors Group, led Investment Banking Services, ran the Communications, Media and Telecom Group, and co-headed the Global Investment Banking Division. Weinberg rose to CEO of Goldman Sachs International, a position he occupied in London from 1999 to 2005. He was on the firm’s Management Committee and also led the firm’s European Management Committee.

=== Perella Weinberg Partners ===
In 2005, after having been chief executive of Goldman Sachs International for seven years, Weinberg decided he wanted to start a new company. Former vice chairman at Morgan Stanley, Joseph Perella, was also planning on starting a new company. The two connected, and they formed a partnership in 2005. They launched their new business in 2006. The company, called Perella Weinberg Partners, is an advisory and asset-management firm based in New York and London. It has expanded since its formation, with approximately 650 employees, approximately $13.8 billion in assets, and additional offices in Abu Dhabi, Denver, Dubai, San Francisco, Houston, Calgary, Los Angeles, Austin and Chicago. Weinberg is a founding partner and was chief executive officer of the firm. Since co-founding the firm in 2006, Weinberg has advised clients on over $800 billion of transactions.

Weinberg is a frequent commentator on CNBC and Bloomberg TV and quoted expert on a range of topics, including: current trends and the future of mergers and acquisitions, shareholder activism, and financial markets and financial institutions in general. He is a regular Op-Ed contributor to The New York Times, The Wall Street Journal, the Financial Times, and The Sunday Times. He has commented on the global economy at the World Economic Forum in Davos, Switzerland.

== Boards and philanthropy ==
Weinberg is on the boards of overseers at Memorial Sloan Kettering Cancer Center and Columbia University Medical School. He is a founding trustee of King's Academy in Jordan. He also is a member of the advisory board of the Kravis Leadership Institute and is on the Harvard University global advisory council.

In 2013, he and his wife Deborah L. Weinberg founded the Weinberg Family Cerebral Palsy Center at Columbia University. He previously was on the board of Deerfield Academy and the Harvard Business School dean's advisory board.

Weinberg is on the executive committee for the Business Higher Education Forum, a group of business leaders and university presidents working to better align higher education curriculum with workforce needs.

== Personal life ==
Weinberg is a dual citizen of the US and the UK. He lives outside of New York with his wife, Deborah, and his three children.

The Weinberg family played a prominent role at Goldman Sachs since the early 1900s. His grandfather, Sidney Weinberg, began as a janitor at the firm in 1907 and rose to be a senior partner for over 30 years. He is known to be “the father of the Modern Goldman Sachs.” His uncle John L. Weinberg was a senior partner of the firm from 1984 to 1990. His father, Sidney J. Weinberg, Jr. was a senior partner and his cousin, John S. Weinberg was also a partner and co-head of the Investment Banking Division from 2002 to 2015.

Weinberg's mother, Elizabeth Houghton, is a member of the Houghton family who founded Corning Glass Works in 1851, now called Corning Inc. She is the sister of Amory Houghton, Jr. and James R. Houghton who both were chairman and CEO of Corning, as was their father Amory. Elizabeth died in December 2018.
