= Gus Levy =

Investment banker

- Born: Gustave Levy; May 23, 1910; New Orleans, Louisiana, U.S.
- Died: November 3, 1976 (aged 66); New York, New York, U.S.
- Occupation: Investment banker
- Employer: Goldman Sachs

Gustave "Gus" Levy (May 23, 1910– November 3, 1976) was Senior Partner at Goldman Sachs from 1969 until his death in 1976. He succeeded Sidney Weinberg as chief executive officer.

== Early life ==
Levy was born on May 23, 1910, to a Jewish family in New Orleans. He was one of three children of Sigmund and Bella Levy. Levy briefly attended Tulane University before dropping out. He moved to New York City, working various jobs in the financial sector, then joined Goldman Sachs in 1933 to head the one-man trading department for a salary of $27.50 a week. He remained at Goldman Sachs for the rest of his career.

== Career ==
Between 1933 and 1969, Levy headed Goldman Sachs' trading department. Levy and Robert Mnuchin pioneered the developed of trading strategies such as block trading. Upon retiring in 1969, the highly banking-oriented Sidney Weinberg had some reservations about placing Levy in charge but ultimately decided to appoint Levy as chief executive officer. He also introduced an eight-man "management committee" system (filled with seven older, experienced senior banking partners) acting as a corporate board alongside Levy. Within the firm, Levy was known for his manifest energy, short temper, intelligence, and generosity.

During Levy's tenure as managing partner from 1969 to 1976, Goldman Sachs experienced substantial growth. The firm also weathered some major controversies, such as the Penn Central bankruptcy and commercial paper scandal. The Penn Central debacle tarnished the firm's reputation, costing Goldman millions of dollars in litigation and settlements.

Levy was chairman of Goldman Sachs until he had a stroke during a Port Authority of New York commissioners meeting in October 1976. He fell into a coma and died at Mount Sinai Hospital at the age of 66. Levy was succeeded by John Whitehead and John Weinberg (son of Sidney Weinberg).

Business positions
Preceded by Sidney Weinberg	Chairman, Goldman Sachs; 1969–1976	Succeeded by John C. Whitehead and John L. Weinberg
