= Merrywood =

American historic house in McLean, Virginia (built c. 1919)

General information
- Architectural style: Georgian Revival
- Location: 700 Chain Bridge Road, McLean, Virginia, U.S.
- Coordinates: 38°56′22″N 77°07′45″W
- Completed: c. 1919
- Client: Newbold Noyes Sr.

Technical details
- Grounds: 7 acres (2.8 ha)

Design and construction
- Known for: Childhood home of Gore Vidal, Jacqueline Kennedy Onassis, and John Dickerson (journalist)

Other information
- Number of rooms: 36 rooms

Merrywood is a historic house in the United States, located in McLean, Virginia, overlooking the Potomac River.

The house has hosted several U.S. presidents and members of the British royal family. The Georgian Revival–style brick dwelling was built in 1919 for Newbold Noyes Sr.

== History ==
The land upon which the estate was built once formed part of General Henry Lee III's Salona Plantation in the late 18th century and was surveyed by George Washington. On the property, Noyes built Merrywood, which was said to be a copy of an 18th-century mansion. The library was paneled with black walnut from trees cut on the estate. The gardens were landscaped by landscape architect Beatrix Farrand, the niece of Edith Wharton.

Noyes Sr. was the associate editor of the Washington Evening Star which his father, Frank Brett Noyes, had acquired in 1867. Frank was also the founder and president of the Associated Press. Newbold and his wife, the former Alexandra Ewing, were the parents of Newbold Noyes Jr. After Newbold's marriage to Alexandra ended, the Noyeses sold Merrywood, their marital home. After the divorce, Alexandra married Thomas Stone and they built Boone Hall in Mount Pleasant, South Carolina.

=== Auchincloss years ===
Sometime between 1927 and 1934, Hugh D. Auchincloss acquired Merrywood from Noyes for $135,000. His maternal grandfather, Oliver Burr Jennings, had been one of the original shareholders of Standard Oil with John D. Rockefeller in 1871. The following year, Auchincloss married Nina S. Vidal, the only daughter of U.S. Senator Thomas Gore and the former wife of Eugene Luther Vidal, a U.S president Franklin D. Roosevelt appointee. Nina and Eugene were the parents of writer Gore Vidal.

After their divorce in 1941, Auchincloss married Janet Lee Bouvier, the mother of future First Lady Jacqueline Kennedy Onassis and Lee Radziwill, in 1942 and the family lived together at Merrywood. Onassis later wrote of the home, stating: "I always love it so at Merrywood - so peaceful… with the river and those great steep hills". The home was enlarged to 23,000 square feet and the estate featured a shooting range, tennis court, Olympic-sized swimming pool and a circular Arts and Crafts–style pool house.

In 1959, the Auchinclosses put Merrywood on the market for $850,000, although it eventually sold for $650,000 to a syndicate led by the Magazine Brothers Construction Company that had hoped to use the property for an apartment development. After Jackie's husband John F. Kennedy was elected president, the Auchincloss family moved to the Georgetown neighborhood of Washington, D.C., in 1963.

A seventeen-story apartment building at Merrywood was proposed, but later dropped after the government took a "scenic easement" that severely restricted development on the property. "The federal government paid $744,000 in early 1964 to compensate for the easement, which assures that the property will be substantially "frozen" in its current state."

=== Later owners ===
On November 14, 1964, the syndicate sold the property for about $660,000 to C. Wyatt Dickerson, a businessman, and his wife Nancy, a reporter for CBS and NBC, and the "first female star of television news," which by then had a swimming pool, a tennis court and a gymnasium. The Dickersons sold 40 acres (16 ha) of the estate for development in 1965; (Note: In the late 1960s, a small luxury community of 35 condominiums directly off Dolley Madison Boulevard, known as "Merrywood on the Potomac", were built on a portion of the subdivided land that was part of the Merrywood Estate.) reducing the estate to the 7 acres (2.8 ha) parcel it remains today. During the Dickerson years, the home was host to Frank Sinatra, James Stewart, Jack Benny, New York Governor W. Averell Harriman, Walter Annenberg, Edward Bennett Williams, and Nancy and Ronald Reagan shortly before his inauguration. The Dickersons later separated, Wyatt moved out in 1981, and they sold the house in 1984.

In 1984, Alan I. Kay, a real-estate investor, and his wife, Dianne Comess, bought Merrywood for $4.25 million which was considered "one of the largest sums ever paid in the Washington area for a single-family residence." Reportedly, "C. Wyatt Dickerson, the Kays and a middleman sealed the deal over a bottle of 1962 Dom Perignon champagne midnight Friday at Georgetown's Pisces Club." The Kays further enlarged the home from a twenty-six-room residence to thirty-six rooms and built the 5,000-square-foot pool house.

In 1999, the Kays sold Merrywood for $15.5 million to William E. Conway Jr., who co-founded the Carlyle Group. He owned Merrywood for less than a year before selling it to former chief executive officer of AOL Steve Case and his wife, the former AOL executive Jean Villanueva, for $24.5 million, again breaking the region's property -sales records. The home featured nine bedrooms, eleven full bathrooms and two partial baths, "formal gardens, a pavilion with full kitchen, indoor and outdoor pools, a carriage house with indoor parking for four automobiles, and a lighted tennis court, plus public rooms scaled to accommodate large gatherings, an expansive master suite with his and her dressing rooms, a private study and exercise room."

=== Current ownership ===
In 2018, the Cases placed Merrywood on the market for $49.5 million, eventually selling it to the Embassy of the Kingdom of Saudi Arabia for $43 million, making it, again, one of the most-expensive properties ever sold in the area.

== In popular culture ==
In his 1967 historical novel Washington, D.C., Gore Vidal put the fictitious "Laurel House", a thinly disguised cover for Merrywood, at the center of his novel.

== See also ==
- List of Gilded Age mansions
- List of historic houses in Virginia
