= John C. Whitehead =

American civil servant (1922–2015)

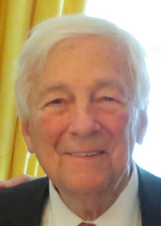

9th United States Deputy Secretary of State
- In office July 9, 1985 – January 20, 1989
- President: Ronald Reagan
- Preceded by: Kenneth W. Dam
- Succeeded by: Lawrence S. Eagleburger

Personal details
- Born: John Cunningham Whitehead; April 2, 1922 Evanston, Illinois, U.S.
- Died: February 7, 2015 (aged 92) New York City, New York, U.S.
- Party: Republican
- Spouse(s): Helene Edith Shannon (m. 1946; div. 1971); Jaan Walther Chartener (m. 1972; div. 1986); Nancy Dickerson (m. 1989; died 1997); Cynthia Matthews (m. 2007)
- Children: 3
- Education: Haverford College; Harvard Business School
- Occupation: Investment banker Political appointee

John Cunningham Whitehead (April 2, 1922 – February 7, 2015) was an American banker and civil servant, a board member of the World Trade Center Memorial Foundation (WTC Memorial Foundation), and, until his resignation in May 2006, chairman of the Lower Manhattan Development Corporation.

== Early life and education ==
Whitehead was born in Evanston, Illinois, the son of Winifred K. and Eugene Cunningham Whitehead. His family moved to Montclair, New Jersey, when he was two years old. While in Montclair he earned his Eagle Scout rank from Troop 12 of Montclair NJ.

Whitehead graduated from Haverford College in Haverford, Pennsylvania, in 1943 and served in the U.S. Navy during World War II, where he commanded one of the LCVP landing crafts at Omaha Beach in the D-Day landing invasion of Normandy.

In 1947, he received an MBA degree from Harvard Business School.

== Career ==
=== Goldman Sachs ===
Whitehead started his career at Goldman Sachs in New York City as an associate in the investment banking division. He quickly became a partner in the firm. He rose to become chairman over a total of 38 years at the firm and retired in 1984 as co-chairman and co-senior partner.

=== U.S. Department of State ===
Whitehead served as United States Deputy Secretary of State in the Reagan administration from 1985 to 1989 under George Shultz and was awarded the Presidential Citizens Medal by President Reagan. In 1996, he was the campaign chairman for Michael Benjamin, who ran for U.S. Congress in New York's 8th congressional district.

== Philanthropy, affiliations and awards ==
In 1986, he received the Golden Plate Award of the American Academy of Achievement. He was later elected to the American Academy of Arts and Sciences in 1988.

He was chairman at different times of the Board of the Federal Reserve Bank of New York, the United Nations Association, the Andrew W. Mellon Foundation and the Harvard Board of Overseers. He was a director of the New York Stock Exchange and Chairman Emeritus of the Brookings Institution. He was a member of Kappa Beta Phi.

He had a long association with the Rockefeller family, having held positions at various times with family-created institutions such as Rockefeller University, the Asia Society, where he was chairman emeritus and an honorary life trustee, the Lincoln Center, and the WTC Memorial Foundation. In these organisations, and previously when he was for a time on the family's powerful Trust Committee, overseeing the family fortune and investments of the Rockefeller Group, the real estate firm that previously owned and managed Rockefeller Center, he became closely associated with David Rockefeller.

As an alumnus of Haverford College in Haverford, Pennsylvania, he has had the campus center and the chair of the philosophy department named after him.

In 1995, he donated $10 million to Harvard Business School to start the John C. Whitehead Fund for Not-for-Profit Management. In 1997, he provided financial support to Seton Hall University in New Jersey to establish the university's School of Diplomacy and International Relations, which was named in his honor. He received an honorary LL.D. from Bates College in 2004 and an honorary Doctor of Humane Letters degree from The City University of New York upon the recommendation of Macaulay Honors College in 2009.

In 1997, Whitehead was elected to the American Philosophical Society.

Whitehead was an Eagle Scout and recipient of the Distinguished Eagle Scout Award. He was longstanding co-chairman of the Board of the Greater New York Councils, Boy Scouts of America. The National Council of the Boy Scouts of America recognized his service with the Silver Buffalo Award in 2015. He was the Chairman of the Financial Services Volunteer Corps (FSVC) from July, 2005 into his death in February 2015. He was also an advisory board member for the Partnership for a Secure America, a not-for-profit organization dedicated to recreating the bipartisan center in American national security and foreign policy.

Whitehead sat on the advisory board of the Washington-based think-tank Global Financial Integrity, which conducts research on illicit financial flows and the damaging effects they have on developing countries, as well as the advisory board for DC-based nonprofit America Abroad Media. He was also a member of the Board of Trustees of Eisenhower Fellowships.

Whitehead was a board member and head of the investment committee of the Getty Trust. He retired from that position in 1996 following a substantial portfolio loss from the use of stock options for a so-called "collar".

In 2004, he received the David Rockefeller Bridging Leadership Award from Synergos.

Whitehead was co-chairman of AMDeC Foundation, a 28-member organization of leaders in biomedical research and technology in New York State. Whitehead, along with Academic Medicine Development Company (AMDeC) President, Dr. Maria K. Mitchell, secured funding and infrastructure support for next-generation research for New York's renowned academic medical centers. In 2006, Whitehead was one of the most notable Republican donors to the campaign of Joe Lieberman during his independent re-election campaign for the United States Senate.

In 2006, John Whitehead joined hands with late actor Paul Newman and Josh Weston, former chairman of ADP, to co-found Safe Water Network, to improve access to safe water to underserved communities around the world.

On November 12, 2008, Whitehead said at the Reuters Global Finance Summit that the U.S. economy faced an economic slump deeper than the Great Depression and that a growing deficit threatened the credit of the country.

In 2011, John C. Whitehead was awarded the Truman-Reagan Medal of Freedom.

In 2012, Whitehead was awarded the Freedom Prize for the second time. He was also a member of the Steering Committee of the Bilderberg Group.

He served on the Board of Trustees at the 9/11 Memorial & Museum and the National Gallery of Art, as well as several Leadership and Advisory Committees at the New York Public Library.

== Publications ==
In 2005, Whitehead published a memoir, A Life In Leadership: From D-Day to Ground Zero.

=== Select publications ===
- Whitehead, John C. "Towards a Stronger International Economy." Bissell Paper No. 7. Toronto: University of Toronto, Centre for International Studies, 1988.

== Personal life ==
Whitehead married television newswoman Nancy Dickerson in 1989, by which marriage he gained five stepchildren. She died in 1997. Her son, John Dickerson, the writer, is one of his stepchildren. In 2003, Whitehead dedicated the Nancy Dickerson Whitehead Community Service Center for Homeless Youth in Southeast Washington, D.C., with a private donation to Covenant House. Whitehead died on February 7, 2015, of cancer at his New York home, at age 92. Earlier marriages to the former Helene Shannon, known as Sandy, and the former Jaan Chartener ended in divorce.

Whitehead was survived by his wife, the former Cynthia Matthews; his three children: Anne, Sarah and J. Gregory Whitehead; two granddaughters; seven stepchildren; and 18 step-grandchildren.

Political offices
Preceded by Kenneth W. Dam	United States Deputy Secretary of State; 1985–1989	Succeeded by Lawrence Eagleburger
Business positions
Preceded by Gus Levy	Chairman and CEO, Goldman Sachs; 1976–1985	Succeeded by John Weinberg
