= Kewsong Lee =

American businessman (born 1965)

- 이규성
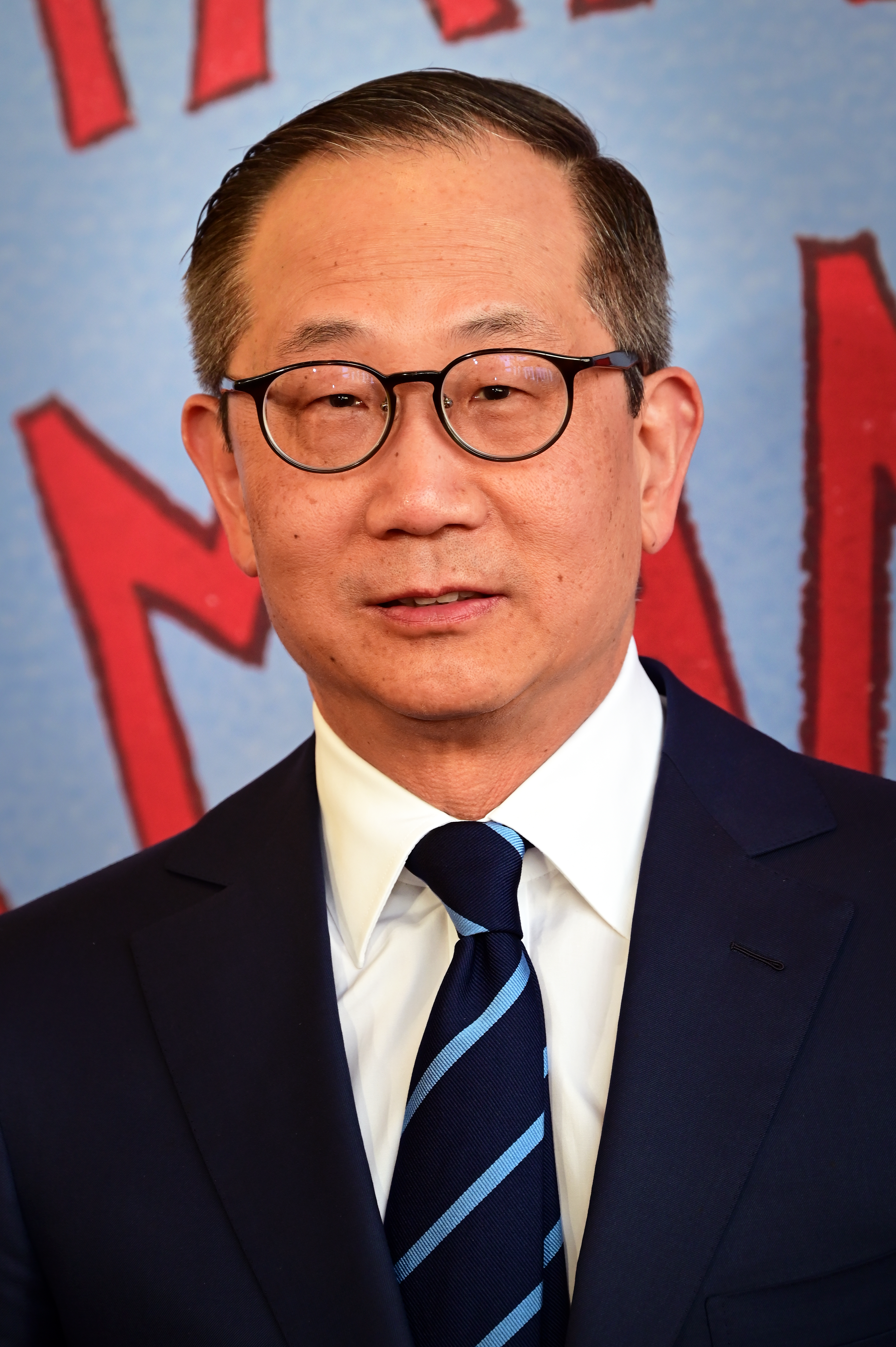
- Lee in 2026
- Born: August 12, 1965 (age 61); Albany, New York, U.S.
- Education: Harvard University (AB 1986, MBA 1990)
- Title: Founder and CEO, BellTower Partners
- Spouse: Zita Ezpeleta (m. 1992)

- Korean name
- Hangul: 이규성
- RR: I Gyuseong
- MR: I Kyusŏng

Kewsong Lee (born August 12, 1965) is an American businessman, who was chief executive officer (CEO) of The Carlyle Group from 2018 to 2022. He founded BellTower Partners in 2023, became the chair of Ascot Group in 2024, and in 2025 became the vice chair of the United Soccer League. Lee started his career in private equity at Warburg Pincus in 1992 before joining Carlyle in 2013. In 2018, Lee and Glenn Youngkin became co-CEOs, succeeding Bill Conway and David Rubenstein. After Youngkin left the firm in 2020, Lee became sole CEO. Lee departed the company in 2022.

== Early life and education ==
Lee was born in Albany, New York on August 12, 1965. He is of Korean descent. His father, Hak Chong Lee, (Note: Also spelt Lee Hak-jong.) was a professor at Yonsei University.

Due to his father's role as a college professor and involvement in the United Nations, Lee would spend his early years in South Korea and Singapore. He then attended boarding school at Choate Rosemary Hall in Wallingford, Connecticut where he graduated in 1982.

Lee attended Harvard College where he received an A.B. in applied mathematics in economics, graduating in 1986. He then received his MBA from Harvard Business School in 1990.

== Career ==
=== Early career ===
Lee's first job after graduation from Harvard was at consulting firm, McKinsey & Company. He spent two years there before leaving in 1988 to attend Harvard Business School.

Lee did a summer internship at Goldman Sachs in 1989 but ultimately decided to return to McKinsey & Company in 1990 after graduating from Harvard Business School.

In 1992, Lee joined private equity firm, Warburg Pincus. He would spend 21 years at the firm where he became a Partner as well as a member of the Executive Management Group. While at Warburg, Lee was involved in transactions that included companies such as Neiman Marcus, Aramark, TransDigm and MBIA.

From 2009 to 2017, Lee was a lead director at Arch Capital Group as well as a board member for other firms such as Transdigm and Aramark.

=== The Carlyle Group ===
In 2013, Lee joined The Carlyle Group as deputy chief investment officer for corporate private equity. In 2015, Lee also assumed the role of leading the global credit unit. In 2018, Lee and Glenn Youngkin became co-chief executive officers, succeeding the founders who remained on the executive board. As co-chief executive officers, Lee oversaw the firm's corporate private equity and global credit businesses, while Youngkin oversaw Carlyle's real estate, energy, infrastructure, and investment solutions businesses. In 2019, Lee and Youngkin oversaw the firm's transition from a publicly traded partnership into a corporation. In July 2020, Youngkin stepped down from his role at Carlyle, making Lee the sole chief executive officer of the firm. According to Bloomberg, though the partnership was intended as equals, Lee ran the company's largest businesses and took initiative while Youngkin's business lines stalled.

As CEO, Lee reorganized the company and invested in new sectors like credit, real estate, and insurance to diversify the company away from its private equity roots. Carlyle's ratio of credit assets to total assets increased from 17% in January 2018 to 38% in June 2022. According to Reuters, under Lee's leadership, Carlyle made progress in core performance metrics, but still lagged rivals such as Blackstone and KKR. In August 2022, Lee stepped down as CEO suddenly during contract negotiations with the board. Sources linked the departure to multiple reasons. The founders wanted more control over the company than what Lee wanted. The founders disagreed with some of Lee's organization and management decisions. Bloomberg News said the poor performance of the company's stock price prompted the founders to act.

=== BellTower Partners ===
After leaving Carlyle, Lee founded BellTower Partners, a holding company. In 2024, BellTower closed a minority investment in Ascot Group Ltd, a global specialty insurance firm, with Lee becoming board chair. BellTower bought a share of Patricof Co, a private equity firm catering to professional athlete investors. Lee became the vice chair of the United Soccer League in September 2025 after BellTower announced a strategic investment in the league.

== Personal life ==
Lee is married to Zita Ezpeleta and they have two children. Lee and Ezpeleta met in Lowell House at Harvard College when they were undergraduates. Ezpeleta is an attorney who previously practiced at Sidley Austin. Lee is the board chair of the Lincoln Center Theater. As board chair, Lee led the appointment of artistic director Lear deBessonet.

== Notes ==
Business positions
Preceded by David Rubenstein; William E. Conway Jr.	CEO of the Carlyle Group; 2018–2022 with Glenn Youngkin (2018–2020)	Succeeded by Harvey Schwartz
