= Nancy Dickerson =

American TV journalist (1927–1997)

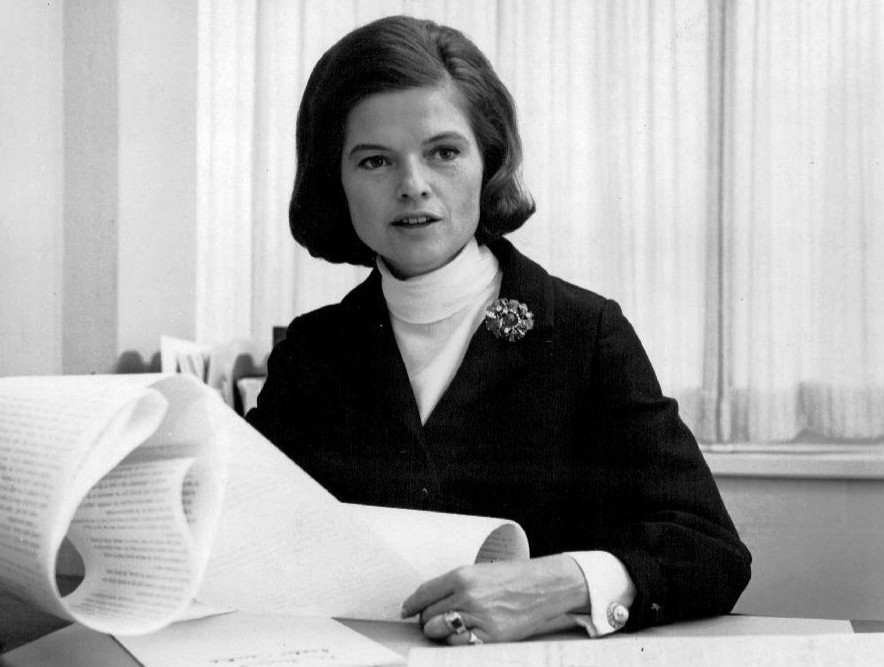
- Nancy Dickerson, circa 1970
- Born: Nancy Conners Hanschman; January 19, 1927; Wauwatosa, Wisconsin, US
- Died: October 18, 1997 (aged 70); New York City, US
- Other name: Nancy Dickerson Whitehead
- Known for: Radio and television journalist
- Spouses: Claude Wyatt Dickerson Jr. (m. 1962; div. 1982); John C. Whitehead (m. 1989)
- Children: 2 including John Dickerson

Nancy Dickerson (January 19, 1927 – October 18, 1997) was an American radio and television journalist and researcher for the Senate Foreign Relations Committee. Famous as a celebrity and socialite (whereby she was sometimes called Nancy Dickerson Whitehead later in life) as well as her journalism, she later became an independent producer of documentaries.

== Early career ==
Born Nancy Conners Hanschman in Wauwatosa, Wisconsin, a suburb of Milwaukee, Nancy Dickerson first attended Clarke College in Dubuque, Iowa, for two years before transferring to the University of Wisconsin–Madison, where she earned a degree in education in 1948.

She worked as a junior high school teacher in West Allis (West Allis Historical Society records) before moving to Washington, D.C., in 1951. She took courses in speech and drama at The Catholic University of America to improve the skills she would need to pursue her dream of becoming a broadcaster. It was in her next position, as a Senate Foreign Relations Committee researcher, that she would develop a passion for the inner workings of government, which would define her career of more than four decades.

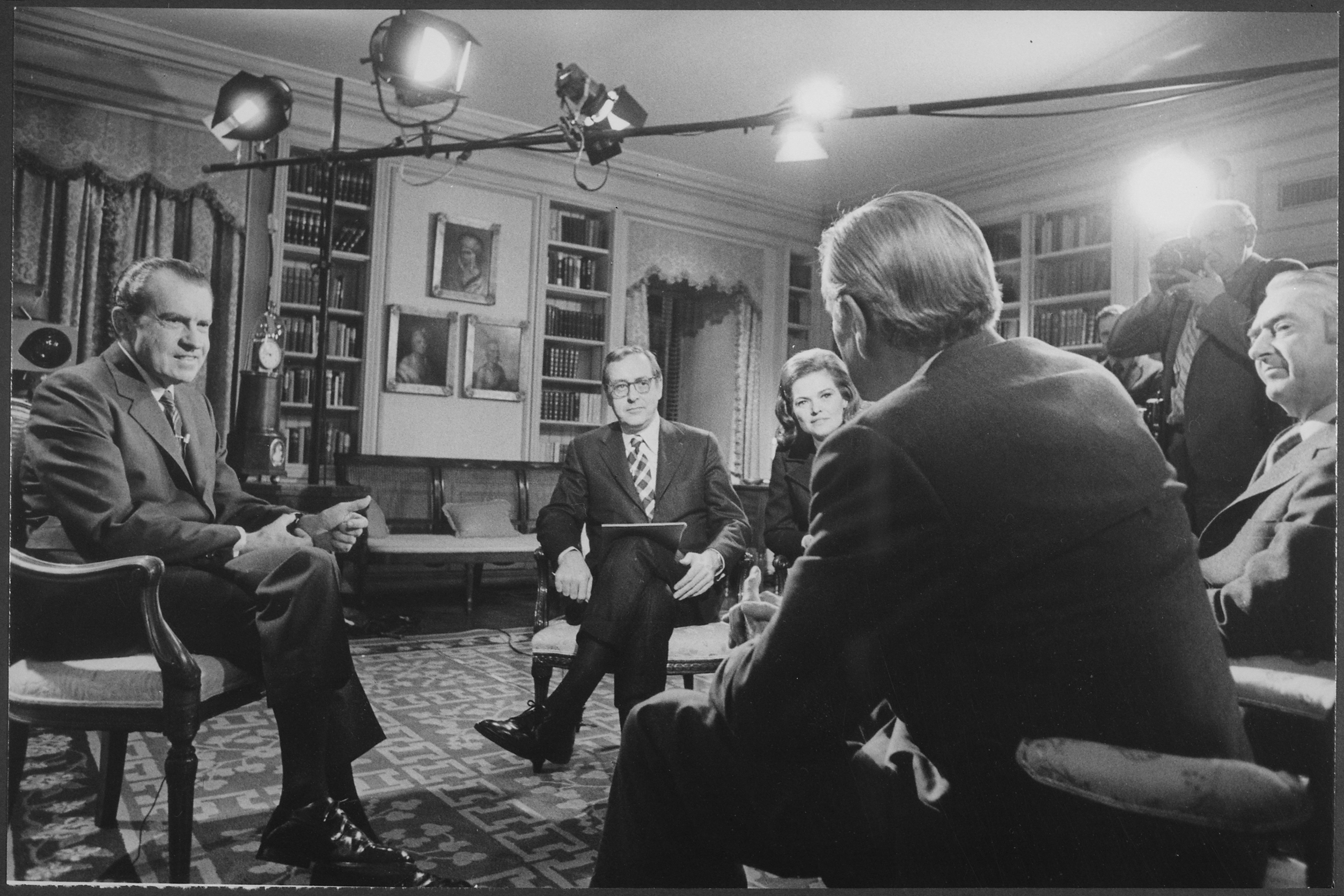
Nancy Dickerson as the PBS representative interviewing President Richard M. Nixon in 1970. John Chancellor at center left; Howard K. Smith at far right, and Eric Sevareid with back to camera.

== Pioneering newswoman ==
Although the field of television journalism was almost entirely dominated by men at the time, Dickerson got her break in 1954, when she was hired by CBS News's Washington bureau to produce a radio show called Capital Cloakroom. She would also become an associate producer of Face the Nation. In 1960, CBS made her its first female correspondent.

She reported for NBC News from 1963 to 1970, covering all the pivotal stories of that time: political conventions, election campaigns, inaugurations, Capitol Hill, and the White House. Dickerson was the first woman correspondent on the floor of a political convention. In 1963, she covered the 1963 March on Washington for Jobs and Freedom, in which Martin Luther King Jr. delivered his famous "I Have a Dream" speech. She was also part of NBC's coverage of President Kennedy's assassination and funeral. Her narration is heard on the NBC videotape at the Andrews Air Force Base arrival of the late president's remains and the statement made by the newly sworn in Lyndon B. Johnson in Washington, D.C. She narrated the arrival along with NBC Congressional correspondent Bob Abernethy. NBC Director Max Schindler, who directed the coverage of the arrival for the networks, contributed to the narration in 1965 during a conversation he did with Johnson at the White House for the TV networks, along with NBC White House correspondent Ray Scherer.

== Syndicated broadcaster ==
Dickerson left the network in 1971 to become an independent broadcaster and producer, syndicating a daily news program, Inside Washington. In 1980, she founded the Television Corporation of America, through which she produced documentaries for PBS and others. Most notable among these was 784 Days That Changed America—From Watergate to Resignation, for which she received a Peabody Award and the Silver Gavel Award from the American Bar Association.

== Personal ==
On February 22, 1962, she married industrialist C. Wyatt Dickerson and became stepmother to his three daughters from a prior marriage. They had two sons together, Michael and John. They lived at "Merrywood", a 46-acre estate in McLean, Virginia, throughout most of the marriage, which ended in divorce.

In her 1976 memoir Among Those Present, she recalled that The Washington Daily News once offered her a job as women's editor, but she turned it down because "it seemed outlandish to try to change the world writing shopping and food columns." She appeared as a mystery guest on the game show What's My Line?

Dickerson moved to New York City in 1989. On February 25, 1989, she married former Goldman Sachs chairman John C. Whitehead. He later served as World Trade Center Memorial Foundation chairman and died on February 7, 2015.

Dickerson died in New York City on October 18, 1997, of complications from a stroke, aged 70. She is buried at Arlington National Cemetery – Section 3, Grave# 1316-A-LH – alongside Whitehead, who had been a commander in the Navy.

Her younger son, John Dickerson, is a journalist who previously hosted the CBS News program Face the Nation and co-hosted on CBS This Morning. He wrote a book, On Her Trail, about his mother's life. In January 2025, John became the co-host of the CBS Evening News.

== Legacy ==
- In 1979, the Supersisters trading card set was produced and distributed; one of the cards featured Dickerson's name and picture.
- Dickerson was a past vice president of the National Press Club. The Nancy Dickerson Whitehead Medallion is awarded annually by Clarke University to an outstanding professional in mass communication.
