= Sidney Weinberg =

American investment banker

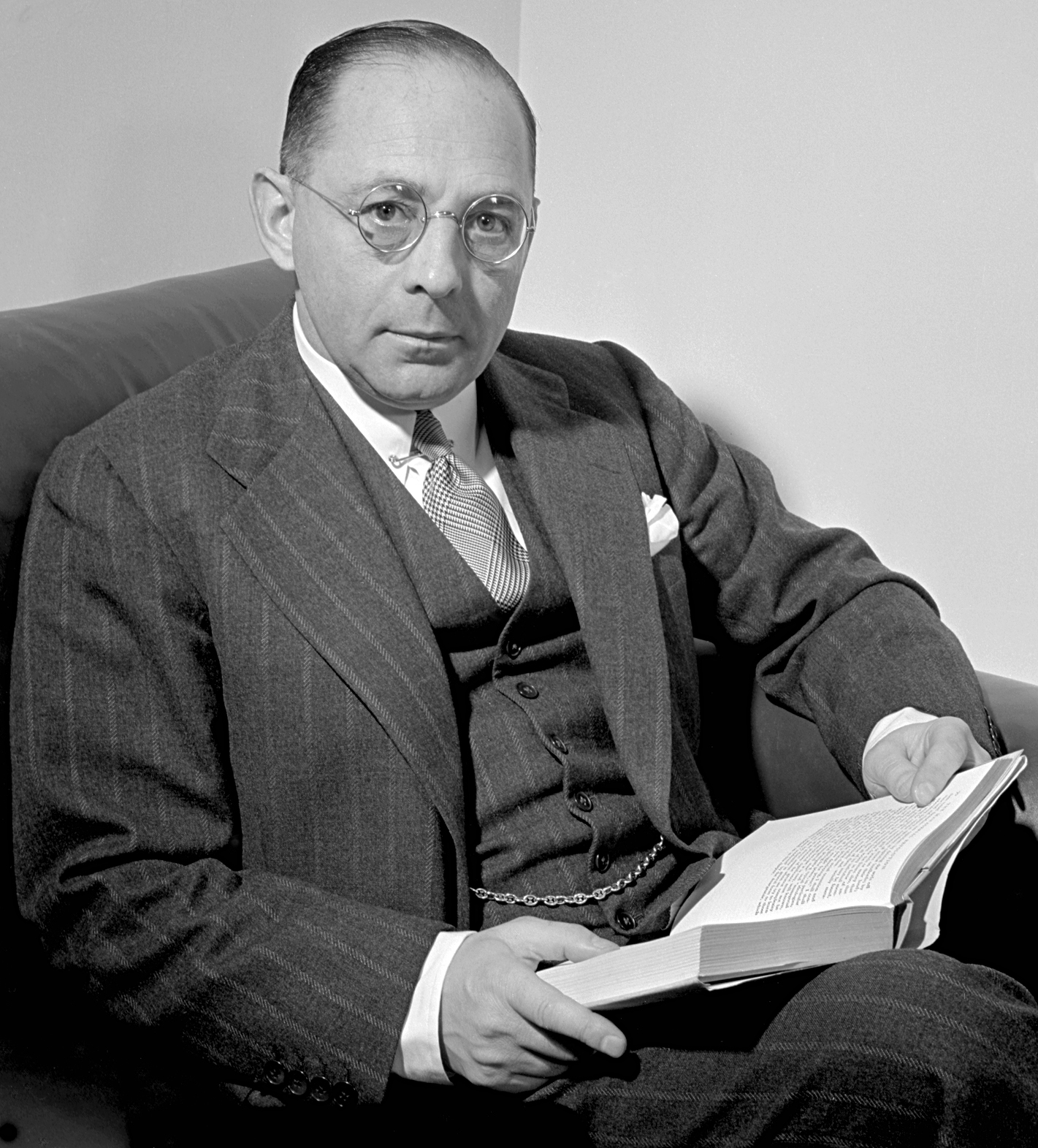
- Weinberg in 1942
- Born: October 12, 1891; New York City, U.S.
- Died: July 23, 1969 (aged 77); New York City, U.S.
- Occupation: Investment banker
- Employer: Goldman Sachs
- Spouses: Helen Livingston (m. 1920; died 1967) Regina Pierce (m. 1968)
- Children: 2 including John

Sidney James Weinberg (October 12, 1891 – July 23, 1969) was a long-time leader of the Wall Street firm Goldman Sachs, nicknamed “Mr. Wall Street” by The New York Times and "director's director" by Fortune magazine. In a rags-to-riches story, he rose from a janitor's assistant, making $3/week, to CEO.

== Early life ==
Weinberg's background contrasted sharply with that of the traditional Ivy League Wall Streeter. Weinberg was one of eleven children of a Jewish immigrant wholesale liquor dealer. His family were active members of Congregation Baith Israel Anshei Emes in Brooklyn, joining when the synagogue was on Boerum Place, and remaining with it when it moved to Cobble Hill. Sidney's mother, Sophie, was sisterhood president from 1912 to 1913, his father, Pincus, served as president from 1919 to 1921, and the children all attended the Sunday school and Talmud Torah. Sidney married Helen W. Livingston there in 1920. Sidney's name does not appear in any synagogue documents after World War I, indicating less active membership in his adult life.

Weinberg dropped out of junior high school at P.S. 13, but got a letter of recommendation from one of his teachers to enter the job market. Sidney joined the workforce at the age of ten "selling newspapers at the Manhattan-Brooklyn ferry terminal, shucking oysters, and carrying feathers for a milliner." At one point, Sidney found jobs as a runner at three different brokerage houses. The conflicts of interest cost him all three positions.

== Career at Goldman Sachs ==
Weinberg started with Goldman Sachs as a janitor's assistant at $3/week, where his responsibilities included brushing the firm's partners’ hats and wiping the mud from their overshoes. The grandson of the firm's founder, Paul J. Sachs, liked Weinberg, and promoted him to the mailroom, which Weinberg reorganized. To improve Weinberg's penmanship, Sachs sent him to Browne's Business College in Brooklyn.

Weinberg did a stint in the U.S. Navy in World War I, and afterwards became a securities trader. Goldman Sachs bought Weinberg a seat on the New York Stock Exchange in 1925.

Weinberg became a Goldman Sachs partner in 1927 and helped run the investment trusts, including Goldman Sachs Trading Corp. He co-ran the division with Waddill Catchings, who shriveled the market value of Goldman Sachs Trading Corp. from $500 million to less than $10 million. At this point, Weinberg took over the division, becoming a senior partner in 1930. He became head of the firm in 1930, saving it from bankruptcy, and held that position until his death in 1969.

== Public service ==
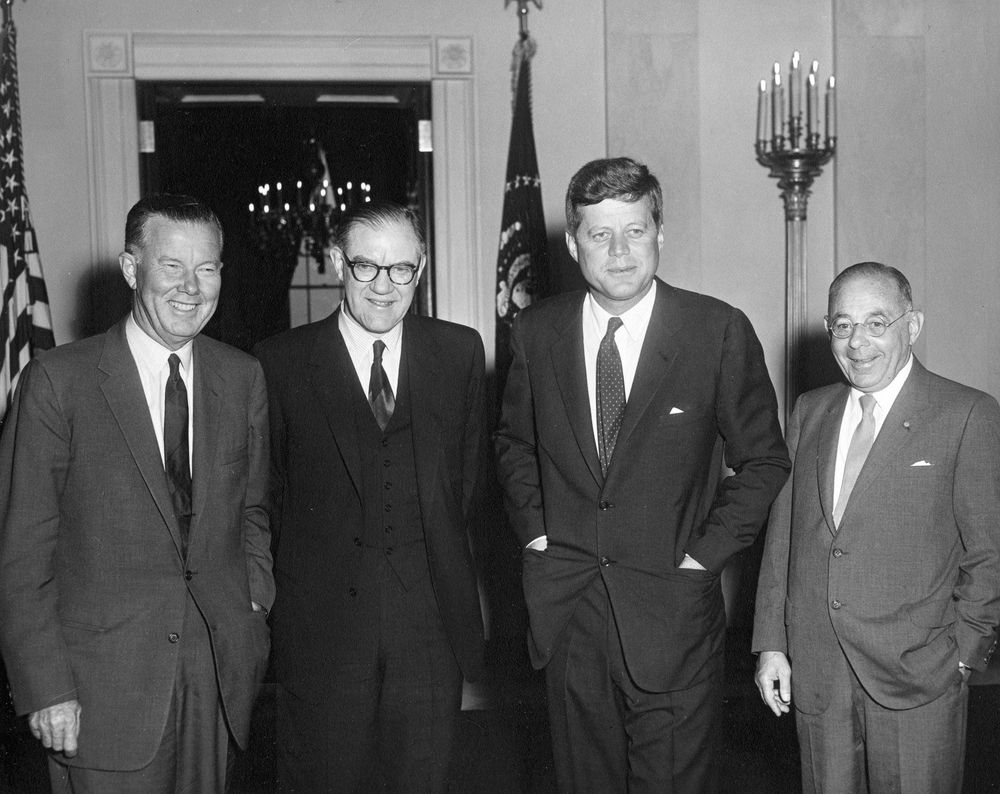
President John F. Kennedy meets with members of the Business Council (formerly the Business Advisory Council) in Cross Hall, White House, Washington, D.C., in 1961. (left to right) Leonard F. McCollum; Roger Blough; President Kennedy; Sidney J. Weinberg.

Weinberg befriended Franklin D. Roosevelt in 1932 while working as a member of the Democratic Party's National Campaign Finance Committee, and successfully raised more funds than any other member. Since many on Wall Street had opposed Roosevelt in the 1932 presidential election, Weinberg stood out as a prime candidate for the new president's liaison to Wall Street. Indeed, in 1933, Roosevelt assigned Weinberg the task of organizing a group of corporate executives- called the Business Advisory and Planning Council – to serve as a bridge between the government and the private sector during the economic upheaval of the New Deal. Weinberg handpicked executives with whom he wanted to develop business relationships, and deliberately invited no other investment bankers to join the Council, putting himself in the perfect position to network. Roosevelt admired Weinberg's work greatly, nicknaming him “The Politician” and offering him numerous federal appointments, all of which Weinberg refused.

When the United States entered World War II in 1941, Weinberg played an active role in engaging America's private sector to overcome the nation's considerable financial, industrial, and organizational challenges. Weinberg repeatedly proclaimed, “government service is the highest form of citizenship,” and, “I’ll never take a job in government in peacetime, but I’ll take any job in time of war.” Following Weinberg's success recruiting corporate talent for the Business Advisory and Planning Council, President Roosevelt entrusted Weinberg with an even more important mandate: forming the Industry Advisory Committee under the War Production Board’s Chairman, Donald M. Nelson.

Weinberg personally met with the CEOs of America’s top corporations and told them: “Our nation is in grave danger. America needs an enormous number of talented executive leaders to organize a massive war production effort. The President has sent me here to get your help in identifying your very best young men. We need the smartest young stars you’ve got. And don’t even think of passing off older men or second-raters. I’m asking the same thing of every major company in the country, and I’ll be watching very closely how well your men do compared to the best young men from all the other corporation. God forbid the people you pick are less than the best because God, President Roosevelt, and I would never, ever forgive you.”

In 1942, Weinberg was promoted to the position of assistant to the chairman of the War Production Board. General Motors CEO Charles Erwin Wilson said of Weinberg's service during this period: “His wide and influential friendships were invaluable in inducing outstanding men to come to Washington with us.”

== Ford ==
Weinberg's position on the War Production Board helped him to forge close personal relationships with many of America's top young businessmen. When the war ended, many of these executives hired Weinberg as their investment banker, thereby boosting the prestige of Goldman Sachs’ client engagements. Many executives invited Weinberg to join their own companies’ boards. Weinberg served on the boards of many of America's leading blue chip companies, including those of Ford Motor Company, General Electric, Sears Roebuck, Continental Can, National Dairy Products Corporation, B.F. Goodrich Company, and General Foods Corporation.

Perhaps Weinberg's most important relationship from the War Production Board was with Henry Ford II, the eldest grandson of Henry Ford I. Following the death of his father Edsel Ford in 1943, Henry Ford II soon became president of Ford Motor Company – at that time America's largest private corporation. While enormous, Ford Motor Company faced considerable financial and strategic challenges transitioning from military manufacturing to a peacetime economy. Weinberg helped Ford to recruit a group of new executives including Ernie Breech and Theodore O. Yntema to revitalize the struggling automobile company. In return for Weinberg's advice, Ford chose Weinberg to lead the underwriting syndicate for Ford Motor Company's 1956 initial public offering. The Ford IPO was the largest the United States had ever seen, raising nearly seven hundred million dollars (roughly five billion dollars in today's terms), and considerably promoting Goldman Sachs’ position on Wall Street as a top investment bank.

== Political influence ==
While a lifelong fundraiser for the Democratic Party, Weinberg supported the Republican candidate Dwight D. Eisenhower in his 1952 presidential bid; Weinberg's campaigning efforts were critical to gathering support for Eisenhower among the business community. In return for Weinberg's backing, Eisenhower appointed several of Weinberg's recommendations to important cabinet positions, including George M. Humphrey of M.A. Hanna Company for Treasury Secretary; Charles Erwin Wilson of General Motors for Secretary of Defense; and Robert T. Stevens of J.P. Stevens & Co. for Secretary of the Army. Likewise, after Weinberg helped Lyndon B. Johnson win the presidency in 1964, Johnson appointed Weinberg's recommendations of John T. Connor for Secretary of Commerce and Henry H. Fowler for Secretary of the Treasury.

== Family ==
Weinberg married Helen Livingston in 1920 and the couple lived in Scarsdale, New York. They had two children, John Livingston Weinberg and Sidney J. "Jim" Weinberg, Jr., both of whom were partners of Goldman Sachs. His grandson John S. Weinberg was the company's vice chairman and another grandson Peter Weinberg was the company's head of European business before co-founding the boutique investment bank Perella Weinberg Partners.

== Notes ==
Business positions
Preceded by Samuel Sachs	Chairman and CEO, Goldman Sachs; 1930–1969	Succeeded by Gus Levy
