= Conway School of Nursing =

Nursing school of Washington, D.C., U.S.

Coordinates: 38.9329387°N 76.9977828°W

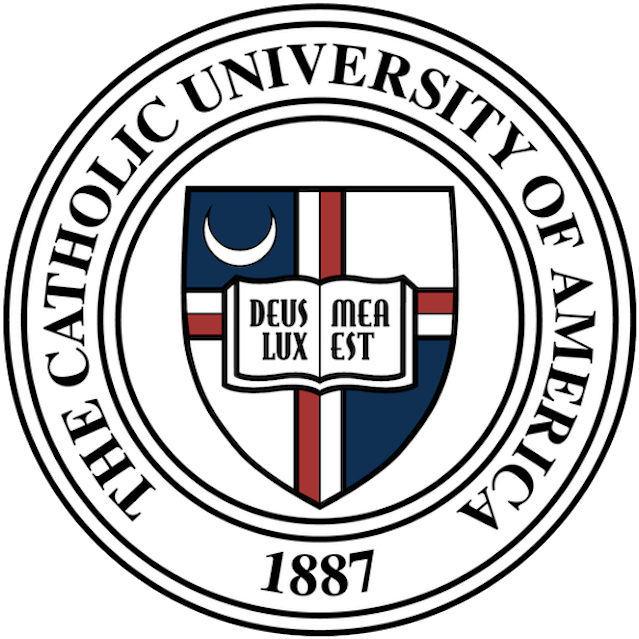
- Established: 1932; 94 years ago
- Parent institution: Catholic University of America
- Affiliation: Catholic
- Dean: Marie Nolan
- Location: Washington, D.C., U.S.
- Website: nursing.catholic.edu/

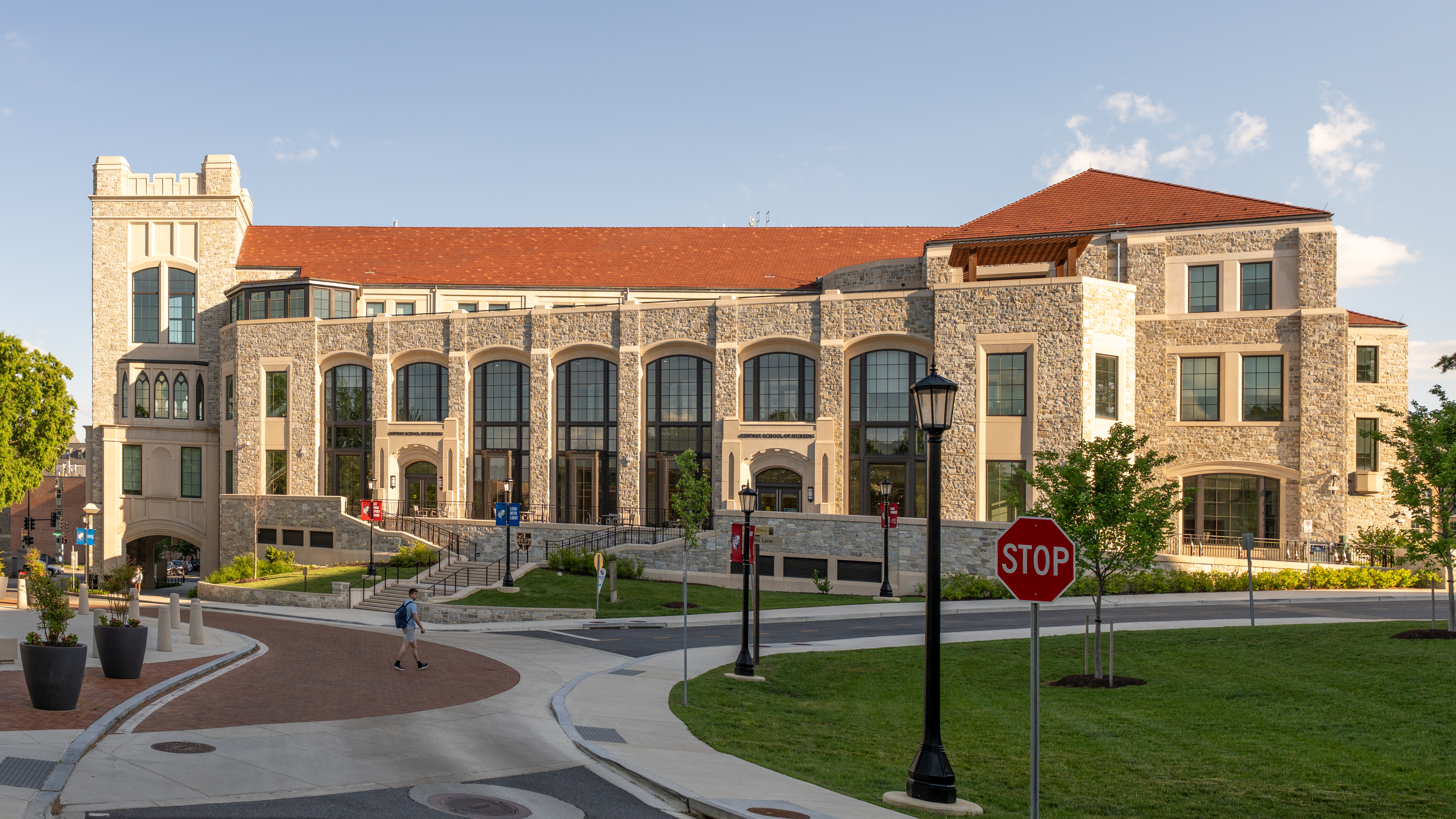
New Conway School of Nursing Building (2026)

The Conway School of Nursing is the nursing school of The Catholic University of America. It was founded in 1935, and was named after Joanne and Bill Conway in 2019.

Courses and degree programs at the school include Bachelor Science in Nursing, Spanish for Healthcare Professionals, Master of Science in Nursing, Family Nurse Practitioner, and Doctor of Nursing Practice.

According to U.S. News & World Report, The School of Nursing at The Catholic University of America ranks #41 of Best Nursing School, Master's and #42 for Best Nursing Schools DNP.

== Clinical hours ==
Undergraduate nursing students complete approximately 525 clinical hours at MedStar Washington Hospital Center, the Inova Health System, George Washington University Hospital, Holy Cross Hospital and Children's National Hospital among some other sites.
