= Harvey Schwartz =

American investment banker (born 1964)

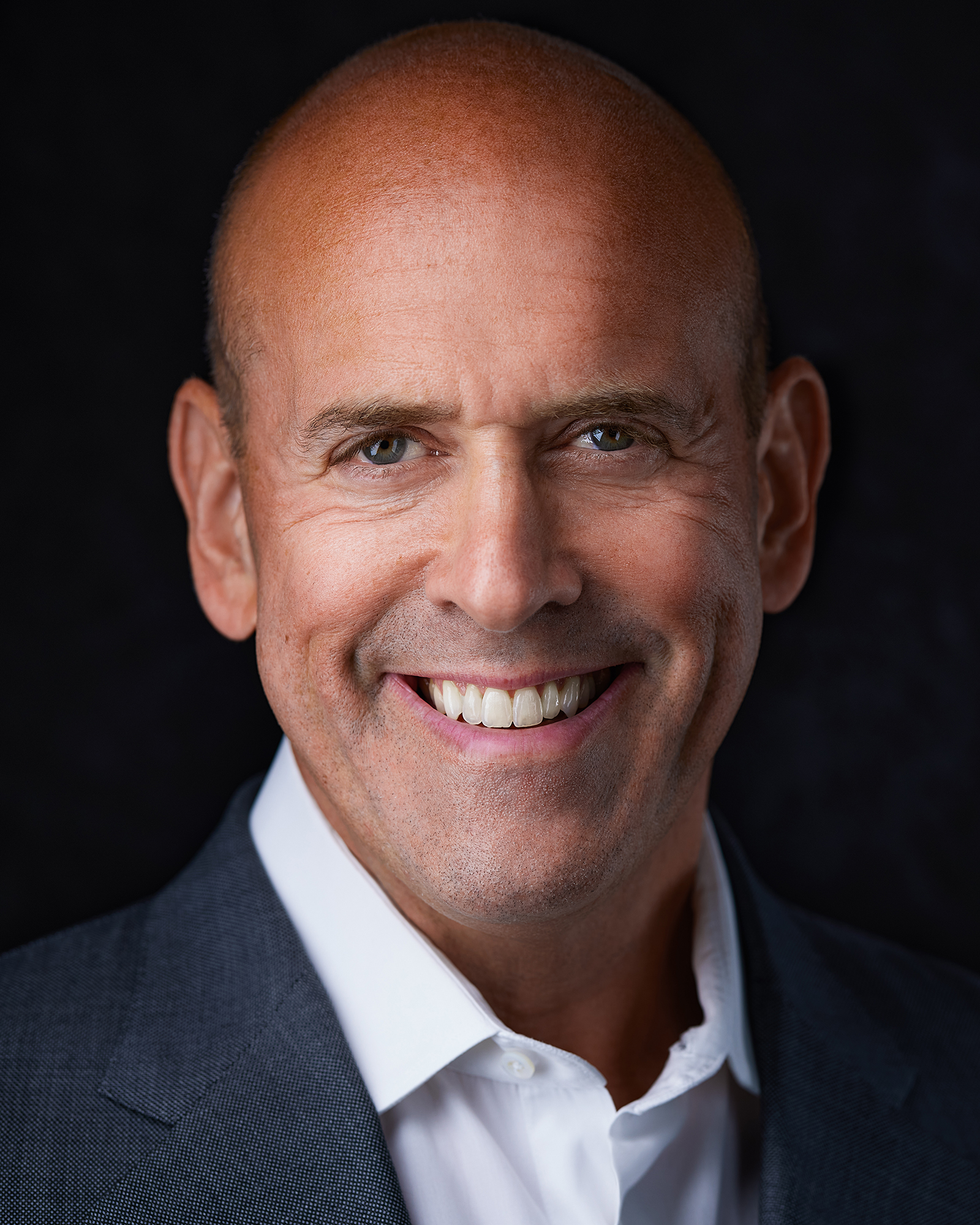
- Born: March 11, 1964 (age 62); Morristown, New Jersey, U.S.
- Education: Rutgers University, New Brunswick (BA); Columbia University (MBA)
- Title: CEO of The Carlyle Group; Former Group Chairman and Non-executive Director of The Bank of London; Former President and co-Chief Operating Officer of Goldman Sachs

Harvey M. Schwartz (born March 11, 1964) is an American investment banker and business executive who has been chief executive officer (CEO) of The Carlyle Group, the world's sixth-largest private equity firm, since February 2023. He worked at Goldman Sachs from 1997 to 2018, rising through the position of chief financial officer to that of president and co-chief operating officer.

== Early life and education ==
Schwartz was born in Morristown, New Jersey. His father was a scientist. He graduated with a bachelor's degree in economics from Rutgers University in 1987. In 1996, he received his MBA from Columbia Business School.

== Career ==
Schwartz began his career in 1987 at J. B. Hanauer & Co., and then moved to First Interregional Equity Corporation. In 1989, Schwartz joined Citigroup, where he worked in the firm's credit training program and developed a specialty in structuring commodity derivatives.

Schwartz joined Goldman Sachs in 1997 as a vice president in its commodities trading business, J. Aron & Co., which the investment bank had previously acquired in 1981. At Goldman Sachs, he held senior executive leadership roles overseeing sales and trading, finance, technology and operations. He was the firm's chief financial officer beginning in 2012, and then president and co-COO starting in 2016, with David M. Solomon being the other co-COO. Schwartz departed Goldman Sachs in 2018, and shortly afterward Solomon was designated as the successor to outgoing CEO Lloyd Blankfein.

Schwartz joined the board of directors of SoFi Technologies as the company became public in early 2021 and later stepped down in 2024. In November 2021, Schwartz assumed the role of group chairperson and non-executive director of The Bank of London. The Bank of London is a privately held global company with a $1.1bn valuation, which provides clearing, agency, and transaction banking services. In October 2024, he left these roles at the bank. Schwartz sits on the board of One Mind, a research and mental health advocacy nonprofit organization.

Schwartz supported Democratic presidential candidate Joseph Biden in the 2020 U.S. presidential election by contributing at least $100,000 to the Biden Action Fund.

Schwartz became CEO of the Carlyle Group on February 15, 2023. He was appointed to the position by the firm's board of directors following a six-month search.

In 2023, Schwartz's total compensation from the Carlyle Group was $187 million, representing a CEO-to-median worker pay ratio of 813-to-1 for the company, as well as making Schwartz the second highest paid CEO in the US that year.

Business positions
Preceded by Kewsong Lee	CEO of the Carlyle Group; 2023	Incumbent
