= The Carlyle Group =

American multinational financial company

The Carlyle Group Inc.
- Type: Public
- Traded as: Nasdaq: CG; S&P 400 component
- Industry: Private equity
- Founded: 1987; 39 years ago
- Founders: William E. Conway Jr.; Stephen L. Norris; Daniel A. D'Aniello; David Rubenstein; Greg Rosenbaum
- Headquarters: 1001 Pennsylvania Avenue, Washington, D.C., U.S.
- Key people: Harvey Schwartz (CEO); Daniel A. D'Aniello (chairman emeritus); William E. Conway Jr. (co-chairman); David Rubenstein (co-chairman)
- Products: Leveraged buyouts; Growth capital; Energy; Energy lending; Structured credit; Real estate
- Revenue: ▲US$5.43 billion (2024)
- Operating income: ▲US$2.18 billion (2024)
- Net income: ▲US$1.02 billion (2024)
- AUM: ▲US$441 billion (2024)
- Total assets: ▲US$23.1 billion (2024)
- Total equity: ▲US$6.35 billion (2024)
- Number of employees: c. 2,300 (2024)
- Website: carlyle.com

The Carlyle Group Inc. is an American multinational company with operations in private equity, alternative asset management and financial services. As of 2023, the company had $426 billion of assets under management.

Carlyle specializes in private equity, real assets, and private credit. One of the world's largest investment firms, it ranked first among private equity firms by capital raised from 2010-2015, according to the PEI 300 index. In June 2024, it ranked sixth in Private Equity International's PEI 300 ranking among the world's largest private equity firms.

Founded in 1987 in Washington, D.C., the company has nearly 2,200 employees in 28 offices on four continents as of December 2023. On May 3, 2012, Carlyle completed a US$700 million initial public offering and began trading on the NASDAQ stock exchange.

== History ==
=== Founding and early history ===
Carlyle was founded in 1987 as a boutique investment bank by five partners with backgrounds in finance and government: William E. Conway Jr., Stephen L. Norris, David Rubenstein, Daniel A. D'Aniello and Greg Rosenbaum. The founding partners named the firm after the Carlyle Hotel in New York City (named for Thomas Carlyle) where Norris and Rubenstein had planned the new investment business. Rubenstein, a Washington-based lawyer, had worked in the Carter Administration. Norris and D'Aneillo had worked together at Marriott Corporation; Conway was a finance executive at MCI Communications. Rosenbaum left in the first year and Norris departed in 1995. Rubenstein, Conway and D'Aneillo remain active in the business. Carlyle was founded with $5 million of financial backing from T. Rowe Price, Alex. Brown & Sons, First Interstate Equities, and the Richard King Mellon family.

In the late 1980s, Carlyle raised capital deal-by-deal to pursue leveraged buyout investments, including a failed takeover battle for Chi-Chi's. The firm raised its first dedicated buyout fund with $100 million of investor commitments in 1990. In its early years, Carlyle also advised in transactions including, in 1991, a $500 million investment in Citigroup by Prince Al-Waleed bin Talal, a member of the Saudi royal family.

Carlyle developed a reputation for acquiring businesses related to the defense industry. In 1992, Carlyle completed the acquisition of the Electronics division of General Dynamics Corporation, renamed GDE Systems, a producer of military electronics systems. Carlyle would sell the business to Tracor in October 1994. Carlyle acquired Magnavox Electronic Systems, the military communications and electronic-warfare systems segment of Magnavox, from Philips Electronics in 1993. Carlyle sold Magnavox for about $370 million to Hughes Aircraft Company in 1995. Carlyle also invested in Vought Aircraft through a partnership with Northrop Grumman. Carlyle's most notable defense industry investment came in October 1997 with its acquisition of United Defense Industries. The $850 million acquisition of United Defense represented Carlyle's largest investment to that point. Carlyle completed an IPO of United Defense on the New York Stock Exchange in December 2001, then sold the rest of the stock in April 2004. In more recent years, Carlyle has invested less in the defense industry.

=== Carlyle in the early 2000s ===
Carlyle's 2001 investor conference took place on September 11, 2001. In the weeks following the meeting, it was reported that Shafiq bin Laden, a member of the Bin Laden family, had been the "guest of honor", and that they were investors in Carlyle-managed funds. Later reports confirmed that the Bin Laden family had invested $2 million into Carlyle's $1.3 billion Carlyle Partners II Fund in 1995, making the family relatively small investors with the firm. However, their overall investment might have been considerably larger, with the $2 million committed in 1995 only being an initial contribution that grew over time. These connections would later be profiled in Michael Moore's Fahrenheit 9/11. The Bin Laden family liquidated its holdings in Carlyle's funds in October 2001, just after the September 11 attacks, when the connection of their family name to the Carlyle Group's name became impolitic.

Buyouts declined after the collapse of the dot-com bubble in 2000 and 2001. But after the two-stage buyout of Dex Media at the end of 2002 and 2003, large multibillion-dollar U.S. buyouts could once again obtain high-yield debt financing and larger transactions could be completed. Carlyle, together with Welsh, Carson, Anderson & Stowe, led a $7.5 billion buyout of QwestDex, the third-largest corporate buyout since 1989. QwestDex's purchase occurred in two stages: a $2.75 billion acquisition of assets known as Dex Media East in November 2002 and a $4.30 billion acquisition of assets known as Dex Media West in 2003. R. H. Donnelley Corporation acquired Dex Media in 2006.

Lou Gerstner, former chairman and CEO of IBM and Nabisco, replaced Frank Carlucci as chairman of Carlyle in January 2003. Gerstner would serve in that position through October 2008. The hiring of Gerstner was intended to reduce the perception of Carlyle as a politically dominated firm. At the time, Carlyle, which had been founded 15 years earlier, had accumulated $13.9 billion of assets under management and had generated annualized returns for investors of 36%.

Carlyle also announced the $1.6 billion acquisition of Hawaiian Telcom from Verizon in May 2004. Carlyle's investment was immediately challenged when Hawaii regulators delayed the closing of the buyout. The company also suffered billing and customer-service issues as it had to recreate its back-office systems. Hawaiian Telcom ultimately filed for bankruptcy in December 2008, costing Carlyle the $425 million it had invested in the company.

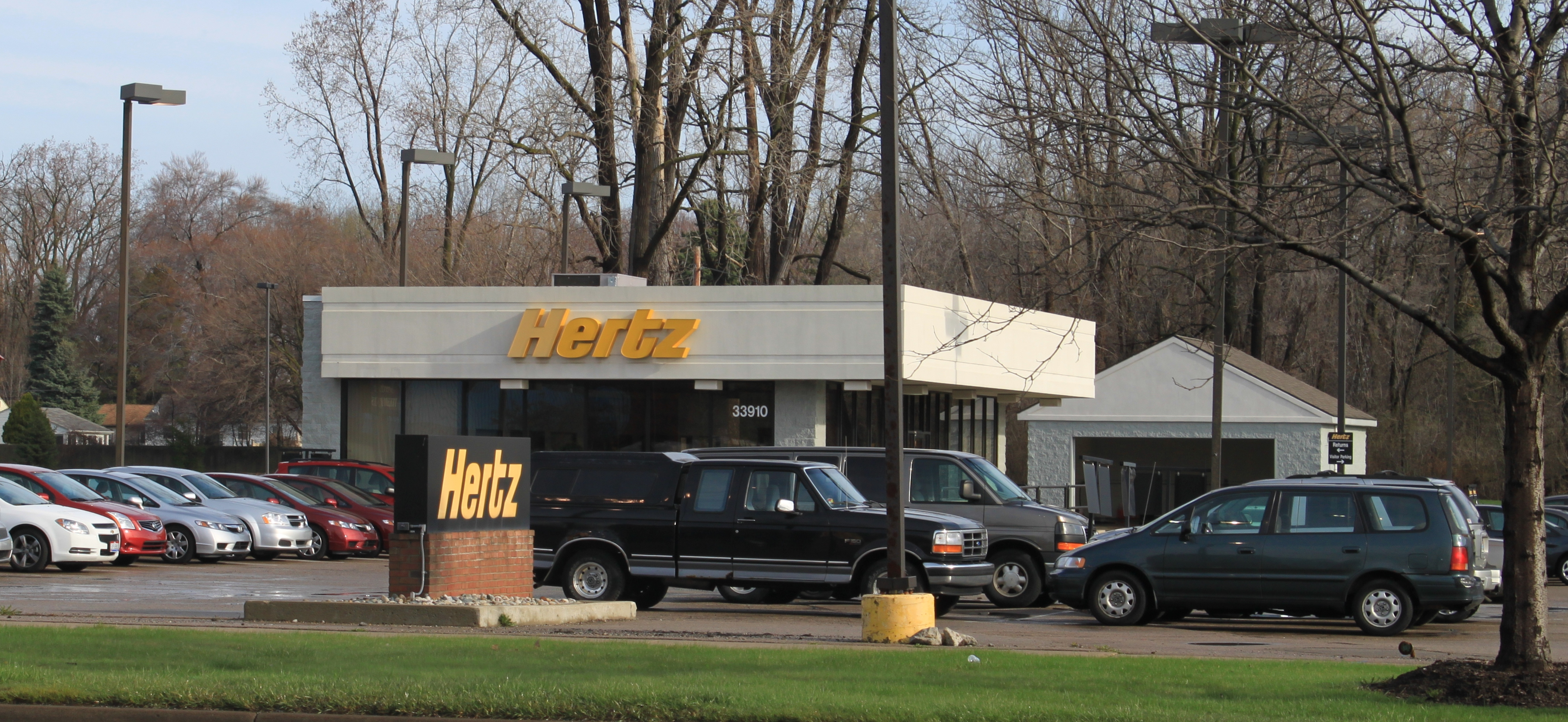
Carlyle led the $15 billion buyout of Hertz in 2005.

As the activity of the large private equity firms increased in the mid-2000s, Carlyle kept pace with such competitors as KKR, Blackstone Group, and TPG Capital. In 2005, Carlyle, together with Clayton, Dubilier & Rice and Merrill Lynch completed the $15.0 billion leveraged buyout of The Hertz Corporation, the largest car rental agency from Ford.

The following year, in August 2006, Carlyle and its Riverstone Holdings affiliate partnered with Goldman Sachs Alternatives in the $27.5 billion (including assumed debt) acquisition of Kinder Morgan, one of the largest pipeline operators in the US. The buyout was backed by Richard Kinder, the company's co-founder and a former president of Enron.

In September 2006, Carlyle led a consortium, comprising Blackstone Group, Permira and TPG Capital, in the $17.6 billion takeover of Freescale Semiconductor. At the time of its announcement, Freescale would be the largest leveraged buyout of a technology company ever, surpassing the 2005 buyout of SunGard. The buyers were forced to pay an extra $800 million because KKR made a last-minute bid as the original deal was about to be signed. Shortly after the deal closed in late 2006, cell phone sales at Motorola Corp., Freescale's former corporate parent and a major customer, began dropping sharply. In addition, in the recession of 2008–2009, Freescale's chip sales to automakers fell off, and the company came under great financial strain.

Earlier that year, in January 2006, Carlyle together with Blackstone Group, AlpInvest Partners, Hellman & Friedman, KKR and Thomas H. Lee Partners acquired Nielsen Company, the global information and media company formerly known as VNU in an $8.9 billion buyout. Also in 2006, Carlyle acquired Oriental Trading Company which ultimately declared bankruptcy in August 2010 as well as Forba Dental Management, the owner of Small Smiles Dental Centers, the largest US chain of dental clinics for children.

=== 2011-2017 ===
In 2011, Carlyle acquired AlpInvest Partners in a joint venture with the firm's management, entering into a new line of business managing fund of funds, secondary investments and co-investments. In 2013, Carlyle acquired the remaining ownership stake in AlpInvest after which that business became a wholly owned subsidiary.

=== Since 2017 ===
In October 2017, the Carlyle Group announced that its founders would remain executive chairmen on the board of directors but step down as the day-to-day leaders of the firm; they named Glenn Youngkin and Kewsong Lee to succeed them, as co-CEOs, effective January 1, 2018.

In October 2017, the Carlyle Group made a $500 million investment in the brand Supreme valuing the company at $1 billion. In 2020, the investment was acquired by VF Corporation, which owns The North Face, Timberland, and Vans for $2.1 billion.

On October 14, 2019, the Carlyle Group and private equity firm Stellex Capital Management announced it had completed the acquisition and merger of shipbuilder Vigor Industrial LLC, Portland, Ore., and MHI Holdings LLC, a ship repair and maintenance company based in Norfolk, Va. The terms of the deal were not disclosed.

In October 2019, the Carlyle Group announced an agreement to acquire Hilb Group, a Richmond, Virginia–based insurance brokerage, from ABRY Partners.

On June 2, 2020, the Carlyle Group and T&D Holdings reported that they had concluded their purchase of a 76.6% stake in Fortitude Group Holdings, the latter of which comprises Fortitude Re, and American International Company Inc. Also in June 2020, Unison had been purchased by the Carlyle Group and Unison management strategic investment company.

In September 2020, the Carlyle Group acquired a majority stake in Minneapolis-based sanitizing machine maker Victory Innovations. Terms of the deal were not disclosed.

At the end of September 2020, Youngkin retired from the firm, stating his intention to focus on community and public service; this left Lee as the sole CEO. Youngkin would later go on to be elected Governor of Virginia in the state's 2021 gubernatorial election.

In January 2021, the Carlyle Group acquired a majority stake in Jagex, a British video game development studio known for the massively multiplayer online game RuneScape.

In May 2021, the Carlyle Group entered a partnership agreement with SPX Capital to enter the Brazilian market. The Carlyle Group's employees would join SPX Capital to establish its private equity strategy. SPX Capital would also become a subadvisor to the Carlyle Group's $776 million buyout fund focused on South America.

In March 2022, the Carlyle Group acquired Dainese - an Italian motorcycle kit and clothing company from Investcorp. Following this in May 2022, the Carlyle Group announced the acquisition deal of US government contractor for cyber security and IT defence, ManTech International. The deal, worth $3.9 billion, will include the firm to buyout shares at $96 a share, representing a 32% premium to ManTech's closing price on February 2, 2022. The acquisition aimed to increase the firms steady stream of recurring revenue.

In August 2022, the Carlyle Group acquired Abingworth, a transatlantic bioscience investment firm. In November, it was announced the Carlyle Group has acquired the international marketing agency, Incubeta.

In February 2023, Harvey Schwartz was appointed CEO of the group, replacing Kewsong Lee, who left the position abruptly the previous summer following a power struggle with the co-founders.

In 2023, Carlyle invested in Anthesis Group, a provider of sustainability services for businesses. In September, it was announced Carlyle initiated a tender offer to acquire the Tokyo-headquartered paper and ink chemicals manufacturer, Seiko PMC from its parent company DIC Corporation for $221 million.

In June 2024, Carlyle announced the formation of a new Mediterranean-focused oil and gas company, led by former BP CEO Tony Hayward, after acquiring Energean's assets in Egypt, Italy, and Croatia for up to $945 million. In October, Carlyle Group (TCG) strengthened its partnership with Korea Investment & Securities to discover attractive global products on the one-year anniversary of its strategic alliance.

In February 2025, TCG entered India's auto components market by acquiring a controlling stake in an entity formed through the merger of Indian auto parts companies Highway Industries and Roop Automotives. In the same month, Carlyle announced that it had entered into a definitive agreement with Bluebird Bio to be acquired by a fund managed by SK Capital Partners.

In September 2025, Carlyle announced that its AlpInvest subsidiary had raised approximately US$20 billion for investments in the secondary private equity market. The fundraising included US$15 billion for its flagship secondary investment fund, US$3.2 billion in co-investment commitments and a further US$2 billion for private wealth investment vehicles. The fund was established to acquire existing private equity interests from investors seeking to sell their holdings.

In November 2025, it was announced Carlyle had acquired the Liverpool, UK-headquartered multi-brand online retailer and financial services provider, The Very Group for an undisclosed amount.

The Carlyle Group acquired an ownership stake in Seattle Reign FC, a National Women's Soccer League franchise, in 2024. Two years later, they became a co-owner of the Seattle Seahawks of the National Football League.

On October 1, 2026, Carlyle announced an agreement to acquire Nidec Components, an electronic components manufacturer, from Nidec for approximately ¥103 billion. Completion was scheduled for December 1, subject to regulatory approvals and other closing conditions.

=== Ownership changes ===
For the first 25 years of its existence, Carlyle operated as a private partnership controlled by its investment partners. In 2001, the California Public Employees' Retirement System (CalPERS), which had been an investor in Carlyle managed funds since 1996, acquired a 5.5% holding in Carlyle's management company for $175 million. The investment was valued at about $1 billion by 2007 at the height of the 2000s buyout boom.

In September 2007, Mubadala Development Company, an investment vehicle for the government of Abu Dhabi of the United Arab Emirates, purchased a 7.5% stake for $1.35 billion.

In February 2008, California legislators targeted Carlyle and Mubadala, proposing a bill that would have barred CalPERS from investing money "with private-equity firms that are partly owned by countries with poor records on human rights." The bill, which was intended to draw attention to the connection between Carlyle and Mubadala Development, was later withdrawn.

In May 2012, Carlyle completed an initial public offering of the company, listing under the symbol CG on the NASDAQ. The firm, which at the time managed about $147 billion of assets, raised $671 million in the offering. Following the IPO, Carlyle's three remaining founding partners, Rubenstein, D'Aniello and Conway retained the position as the company's largest shareholders.

In June 2017, Carlyle took its non-traded BDC, TCG BDC, Inc., public in the first business development company IPO since 2014.

Carlyle has been a majority shareholder of Seidor since August 2024.

== Corporate affairs ==
=== Business trends ===
The key trends for Carlyle are (as of the financial year ending December 31):

Year	Revenue in million USD	Net income in million USD	AUM in billion USD	Employees
2015	3,006	(18)	183	1,700
2016	2,274	6	158	1,600
2017	3,676	238	195	1,600
2018	2,427	93	216	1,650
2019	3,377	345	224	1,775
2020	2,935	348	246	1,825
2021	8,782	2,975	301	1,850
2022	4,439	1,225	373	2,100
2023	2,964	(608)	426	2,200
2024	5,426	1,020	441	2,300

=== Ownership ===
Carlyle is mainly owned by institutional investors, who hold around 63% of all shares. The 10 largest shareholders in early 2025 were:

- Daniel A. D'Aniello (9.10%)
- William E. Conway Jr. (8.40%)
- David Rubenstein (8.19%)
- BlackRock (8.10%)
- The Vanguard Group (6.73%)
- Capital World Investors (4.91%)
- William Blair Investment Management (3.37%)
- Morgan Stanley (3.14%)
- State Street Corporation (2.16%)
- Boston Partners (1.92%)

=== Senior leadership ===
- Chairman: None (Daniel A. D'Aniello currently serves as chairman emeritus)
- Chief Executive: Harvey M. Schwartz (since February 2023)

==== Board of directors ====
Carlyle's key board of directors as of May 2025 consists of:

- Harvey M. Schwartz, CEO of Carlyle Group
- William E. Conway, Jr., Co-Founder and Co-Chairman
- David M. Rubenstein, Co-Founder and Co-Chairman
- Daniel A. D'Aniello, Co-Founder and Chairman Emeritus
- Afsaneh Beschloss, Founder and Chief Executive Officer of RockCreek
- Sharda Cherwoo, Former Senior Partner at Ernst & Young LLP
- Linda H. Filler, Former Executive of Walgreen Co, Walmart, Kraft Foods and Hanesbrands
- Lawton W. Fitt, Former Investment Banker and Partner at Goldman Sachs
- James H. Hance, Jr., Carlyle Operating Executive and former Vice Chairman of Bank of America
- Mark S. Ordan, Chairman and Chief Executive Officer of Pediatrix Medical Group
- Derica W. Rice, Former Executive Vice President of CVS Health and former President of CVS Caremark
- William J. Shaw, Former Vice Chairman of Marriott International
- Anthony Welters, Chairman and Chief Executive Officer of CINQ Care Inc. and Executive Chairman of BlackIvy Group, LLC

==== List of chairmen ====
1. Frank Carlucci (1992–2003)
2. Lou Gerstner (2003–2008)
3. Daniel A. D'Aniello (2012–2018)

==== List of former chief executives ====
1. William E. Conway Jr. and David M. Rubenstein (1987–2017)
2. Kewsong Lee and Glenn Youngkin (2017–2020)
3. Kewsong Lee (2020–2022)

== Business segments ==
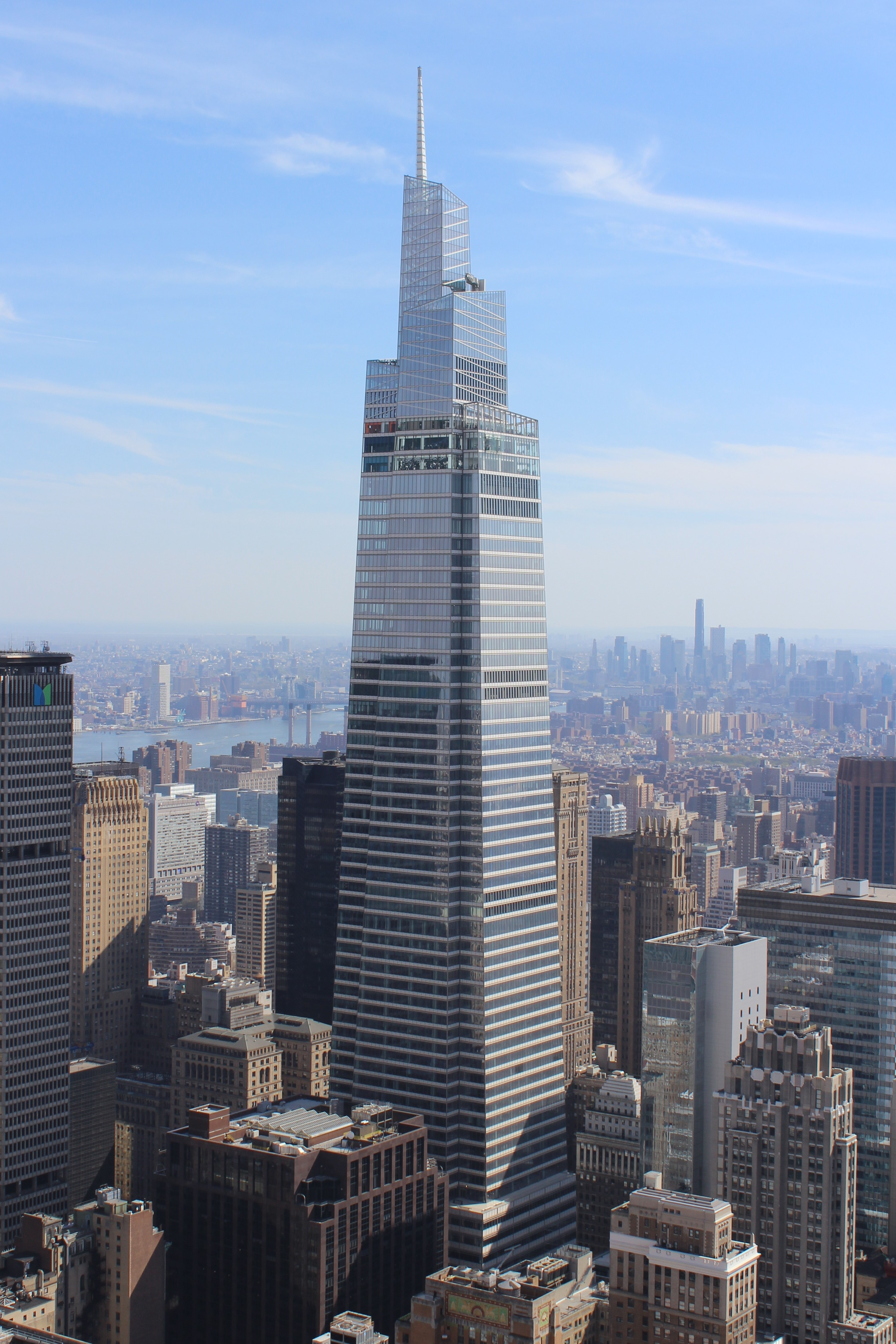
Carlyle's New York offices are based in One Vanderbilt.

The firm is organized into three business segments:

- Global Private Equity – Management of Carlyle's family of private equity funds investing primarily in leveraged buyout and growth capital transactions through a range of geographically focused investment funds. This segment also includes management of funds that pursue investments in real estate, infrastructure and energy and renewable resources.
- Global Credit – Management of funds that pursue investments in distressed & special situations, direct lending, energy credit, loans & structured credit and opportunistic credit; and
- Global Investment Solutions – Management of funds that invest in private equity and real estate fund of funds, co-investment and secondaries through its AlpInvest Partners subsidiary.

=== Global Private Equity ===
Carlyle's Corporate Private Equity division manages a series of leveraged buyout and growth capital investment funds with specific geographic or industry focuses. Carlyle invests primarily in the following industries: aerospace, defense & government services, consumer & retail, energy, financial services, health care, industrial, real estate, technology and business services, telecommunications & media, and transportation.

Carlyle's Corporate Private Equity segment advises 23 buyout and 10 growth capital funds, with $75 billion in Assets Under Management ("AUM") as of March 31, 2018.

Carlyle's Real Assets segment advises 11 U.S. and internationally focused real estate funds, two infrastructure funds, two power funds, an international energy fund, and four Legacy Energy funds (funds that Carlyle jointly advises with Riverstone). The segment also includes nine funds advised by NGP. The Real Assets segment had about $44 billion in AUM as of March 31, 2018.

=== Global Credit ===
Carlyle's Global Credit pursues investment opportunities across various segments of private credit managing $194 billion in AUM as of December 31, 2024. Global Credit's key areas of focus are:

- Liquid Credit, managing collateralized loan obligation investment vehicles.
- Direct Lending, focused on leveraged finance investments primarily in private equity-owned companies.
- Opportunistic Credit, which invests in mezzanine capital and distressed securities
- Real Assets Credit, investing in debt securities in infrastructure projects
- Asset-based lending

=== Investment Solutions - AlpInvest Partners ===
AlpInvest Partners
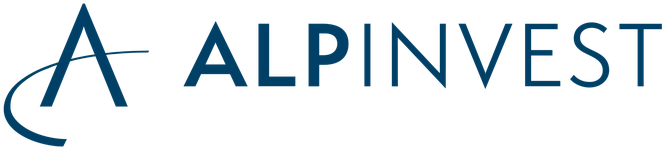
- Type: Subsidiary
- Founded: 1999; 27 years ago
- Founder: Daniel A. D'Aniello; David Rubenstein; William E. Conway Jr.
- Headquarters: New York, New York; Amsterdam, Netherlands; London; Hong Kong; Indianapolis, Indiana; Tokyo
- Products: Fund investments, Secondaries, Co-Investments, Alternative Credit
- Operating income: 1,572,500,000 United States dollar (2022)
- Net income: 1,225,000,000 United States dollar (2022)
- Total assets: ▲$85 billion (Dec 2024) ▲350 private equity managers (Dec 2024) ▲800+ private equity funds (Dec 2024)
- Number of employees: 260 (2024)
- Footnotes; US$100+ billion in capital since inception

Carlyle's Investment Solutions segment advises global private equity through its subsidiary, AlpInvest Partners.

AlpInvest Partners is a global private equity asset manager with over $85 billion of assets under management as of December 31, 2024. The firm invests on behalf of more than 500 institutional investors from North America, Asia, Europe, South America and Africa.

AlpInvest operates through three core investment teams:

- Primary Fund Investments
- Secondary and Portfolio Finance investments
- Co-Investments.

AlpInvest's investments span a broad spectrum of private market strategies including: large buyout, middle-market buyout, private credit, venture capital, growth capital, mezzanine, distressed and energy investments, including sustainable energy investments.

As of the end of 2024, the firm had invested in more than 800 private equity funds managed by more than 350 private equity firms. According to the PEI 300, AlpInvest ranked among the 50 largest private equity firms globally.

Since 2011, AlpInvest has operated as a subsidiary of The Carlyle Group, a global private equity firm. Prior to 2011, AlpInvest has been owned through a joint venture of its two clients, the Dutch pension funds (ABP and PFZW).

Founded in 1999, AlpInvest has offices in New York, Amsterdam, London, Hong Kong, Indianapolis, Singapore and Tokyo with over 100 investment professionals and over 260 employees.

Carlyle had previously acquired a real estate fund of funds group, Metropolitan Real Estate, to provide investors with access to multi-manager real estate funds and strategies with more than 85 fund managers in the United States, Europe, Asia and Latin America. Metropolitan was sold in 2021 to BentallGreenOak.

== Subsidiaries and joint-ventures ==
Carlyle has been actively expanding its investment activities and assets under management through a series of acquisitions and joint-ventures.

=== Carlyle Capital Corporation ===
In March 2008, Carlyle Capital Corporation – established in August 2006 for the purpose of making investments in U.S. mortgage-backed securities – defaulted on about $16.6 billion of debt as the global credit crunch brought about by the subprime mortgage crisis worsened for leveraged investors. The Guernsey-based affiliate of Carlyle was very heavily leveraged, up to 32 times by some accounts, and it expected its creditors to seize its remaining assets. Tremors in the mortgage markets induced several of Carlyle's 13 lenders to make margin calls or to declare Carlyle in default on its loans. In response to the forced liquidation of mortgage-backed assets caused by the Carlyle margin calls and other similar developments in credit markets, on March 11, 2008, the Federal Reserve gave Wall Street's primary dealers the right to post mortgaged-back securities as collateral for loans of up to $200 billion in higher-grade, U.S. government-backed securities.

On March 12, 2008, BBC News Online reported that "instead of underpinning the mortgage-backed securities market, it seems to have had the opposite effect, giving lenders an opportunity to dump the risky asset" and that Carlyle Capital Corp. "will collapse if, as expected, its lenders seize its remaining assets." On March 16, 2008, Carlyle Capital announced that its Class A Shareholders had voted unanimously in favor of the Corporation filing a petition under Part XVI, Sec. 96, of the Companies Law (1994) of Guernsey for a "compulsory winding up proceeding" to permit all its remaining assets to be liquidated by a court-appointed liquidator.

The losses to the Carlyle Group due to the collapse of Carlyle Capital are reported to be "minimal from a financial standpoint".

In September 2017, the court ruled that Carlyle had no liability in the lawsuit.

== In documentaries ==
Carlyle has been profiled in Michael Moore's Fahrenheit 9/11 and William Karel's The World According to Bush.

In Fahrenheit 9/11, Moore makes nine allegations concerning the Carlyle Group. Moore focused on Carlyle's connections with George H. W. Bush and his Secretary of State James Baker, both of whom had at times served as advisers to the firm. The movie quotes author Dan Briody, who claimed that the Carlyle Group "gained" from the September 11 attacks because it owned military contractor United Defense. A Carlyle spokesman noted in 2003 that its 7% interest in defense industries was far less than several other private equity firms.

In The World According to Bush, William Karel interviewed Frank Carlucci to discuss the presence of Shafiq bin Laden, Osama bin Laden's estranged brother, at Carlyle's annual investor conference while the September 11 attacks were occurring.

== See also ==
- Cerberus Capital Management
