= William E. Conway Jr. =

American businessman (born 1949)

- Born: William Elias Conway Jr. August 27, 1949 (age 77); Lowell, Massachusetts, U.S.
- Education: Dartmouth College (AB); University of Chicago (MBA)
- Occupations: businessman, investor, philanthropist
- Title: Co-Executive Chairman of the Board and Co-Founder of the Carlyle Group
- Board member of: Johns Hopkins School of Medicine; Catholic University of America
- Children: William Elias Conway III

William E. "Bill" Conway Jr. (born August 27, 1949) is an American billionaire businessman and philanthropist. Conway is co-executive chairman and co-founder of the Carlyle Group. He is chairman of the board of trustees of Johns Hopkins Medicine and a member of the board of trustees of the Catholic University of America. According to Forbes, Conway had a net worth of US$3.6 billion as of April 2022.

== Early life and education ==
Conway attended Dartmouth College, where he earned a Bachelor of Arts in 1971. Continuing his studies at the University of Chicago Booth School of Business, he received his MBA degree in 1974 with his main focus being on finance. Conway went to night school for his MBA while working at the First National Bank of Chicago.

== Career ==
He started his career working in a variety of positions in corporate finance, commercial lending, workout loans and general management for almost ten years with First National Bank of Chicago. From 1981 to 1986, Conway had worked in various financial positions at MCI Communications being named senior vice president and chief financial officer in 1984. In 1987, Conway founded The Carlyle Group with David Rubenstein and Daniel A. D'Aniello. The firm has grown into a global investment firm with $293 billion of assets under management, with more than 1,800 employees in 31 offices on six continents.

He has been chairman of Nextel Communications and United Defense Industries. He has made charitable donations to the Catholic Church. As of April 2022, he is the 809th richest person in the world, worth of $3.6 billion.

Conway was scheduled to speak at the November 2022 Global Financial Leaders' Investment Summit, with the Hong Kong Democracy Council claiming that his presence, along with other financial executives, would legitimize the Hong Kong government's whitewashing of the erosion of freedoms in the city. Several members of Congress also warned that US financial executives should not attend the Summit, saying "Their presence only serves to legitimise the swift dismantling of Hong Kong's autonomy, free press and the rule of law by Hong Kong authorities acting along with the Chinese Communist Party."

== Political activities ==
Conway's son, also named Bill Conway, ran in the 2020 Democratic primary election for Cook County State's Attorney against incumbent Kim Foxx. Conway gave $500,000 to the campaign the day after his son declared his candidacy and $10.5 million in total, out of the $11.4 million his son had raised a week before the primary; three Carlyle executives were also among the largest donors, the firm's managing director Allan Holt giving $200,000. Opponents used the money to portray his son as, in the Chicago Tribune's summary, "a fake progressive whose father is trying to buy him a powerful office", pointing to the Carlyle Group's holdings in military contractors and to its ownership of the nursing home chain HCR ManorCare, which accumulated allegations of neglecting elderly patients before entering bankruptcy in 2018. A web advertisement by the incumbent, Kim Foxx, said that "the Conway family made billions off global conflict."

== Personal life ==
In 1999, Conway bought Merrywood, the childhood home of Jacqueline Kennedy Onassis, from Alan I. Kay for $15.5 million. Less than a year later, he sold it to Steve Case, the former CEO of AOL and his wife, Jean Villanueva, for $24.5 million. Conway was previously married and divorced. He has one child from his prior marriage, Bill Conway. He lives in McLean, Virginia.

The nursing school of the Catholic University of America, the Conway School of Nursing, is named after him and his wife.

Joanne Barkett Conway died on January 8, 2024, following a short illness. She was 75.

== Philanthropy ==
Conway and his wife Joanne support a number of charities and institutions. In June 2019 they donated $20 million to the Catholic University of America to create the Conway School of Nursing. Since 2012, Conway pledged over $55 million for the Latin American Youth Center to finance the organization's educational programs. Other significant donations of Conway and his wife Joanne include Villanova University's M. Louise Fitzpatrick College of Nursing, the University of Virginia's School of Nursing Trinity Washington University, Georgetown University's School of Nursing, and more.

== Publications ==
- Why We're Investing in America, The Wall Street Journal (November 19, 2012)
