= John Dickerson =

American journalist

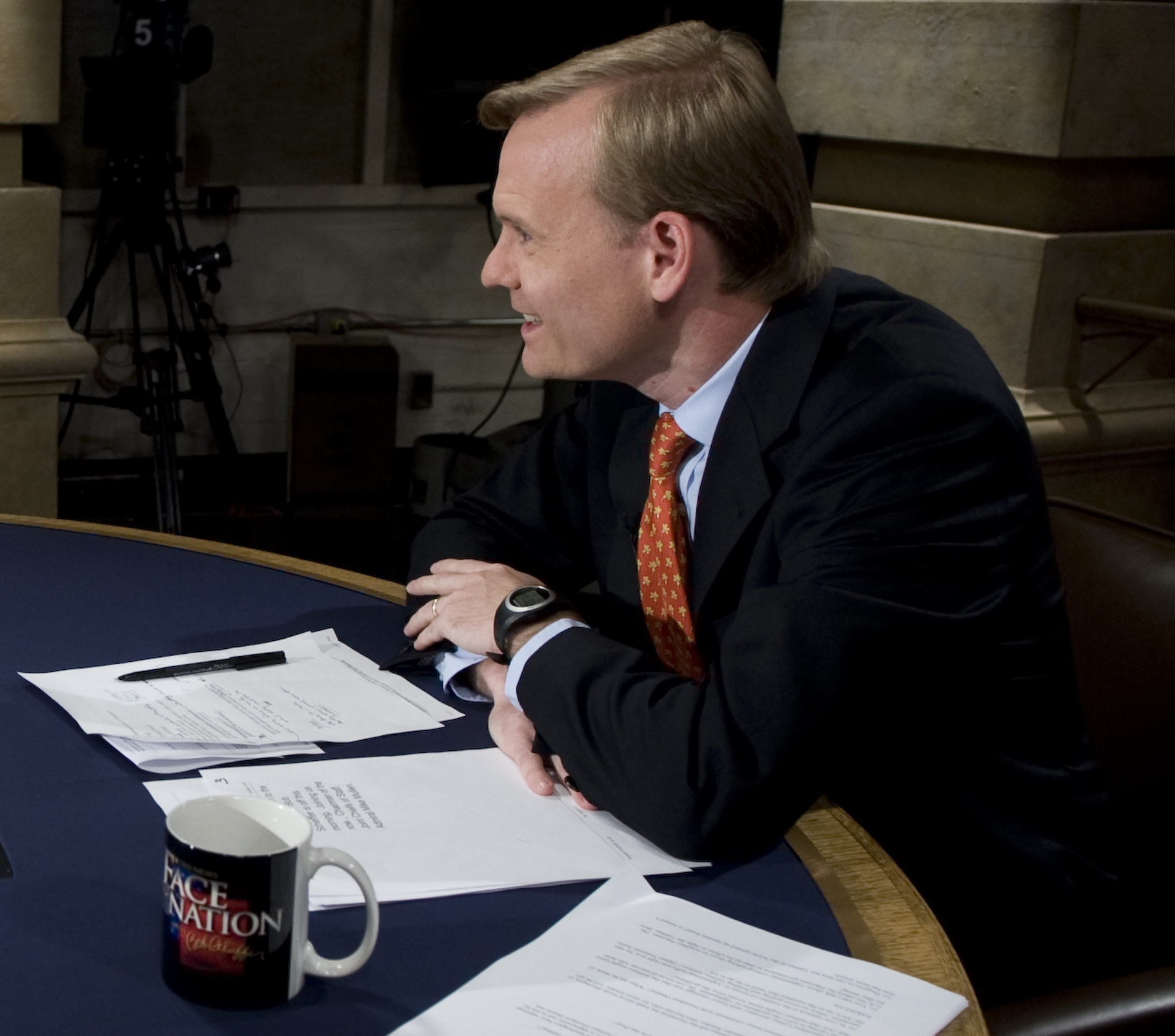
- Dickerson in 2009
- Born: John Frederick Dickerson; July 6, 1968 (age 58); Washington, D.C., U.S.
- Education: University of Virginia (BA)
- Occupations: Journalist; television host
- Spouse: Anne Dickerson (m. 1995)
- Children: 2
- Mother: Nancy Dickerson

John Frederick Dickerson (born July 6, 1968) is an American journalist who is a contributing writer at The Atlantic. Dickerson was previously a journalist for CBS News and in 2025, co-anchor of the CBS Evening News alongside Maurice DuBois.

From 2005 to 2015, he was a political columnist for Slate magazine. Before joining Slate, Dickerson covered politics at Time magazine for 12 years, serving the last four years as its White House correspondent.

Dickerson joined CBS News in 2009 as an analyst and contributor. In 2011, Dickerson was named the political director of CBS News. From 2015 to 2018, he was the moderator of Face the Nation and the chief Washington correspondent. Dickerson also anchored Prime Time with John Dickerson and later The Daily Report with John Dickerson on CBS News 24/7. From 2018 to 2019, he was the co-host of CBS This Morning along with Norah O'Donnell and Gayle King. Dickerson's previous roles also include 60 Minutes (2019–2021) and CBS News' election specials.

== Early life ==
A native of Washington, D.C., Dickerson is the son of Claude Wyatt Dickerson and journalist Nancy Dickerson (née Hanschman; later Whitehead). He has three sisters and one brother. He grew up in McLean, Virginia, at Merrywood, a Georgian-style mansion high on a leafy bluff overlooking the Potomac River.

Dickerson graduated from Sidwell Friends School in 1987. During high school he had an internship in the office of John Warner, then a U.S. Senator from Virginia. He holds a degree in English with distinction from the University of Virginia.

== Career ==
On Her Trail: My Mother, Nancy Dickerson, TV News' First Woman Star, Dickerson's book about his relationship with his late mother Nancy Dickerson Whitehead, a pioneering television newswoman, was published by Simon & Schuster in 2006. In a Washington Post review, staff writer Elsa Walsh called the book "riveting".

Before joining Slate, Dickerson covered politics at Time magazine for 12 years, serving the last four years as its White House correspondent.

Dickerson joined CBS News in April 2009. He moderated Face the Nation three times in 2009 and was appointed Political Director of CBS News in November 2011. He appeared each Wednesday on The Al Franken Show on Air America Radio, until the show ended in 2007, and was also a frequent guest on NPR's Day to Day. He appears on PBS's Washington Week and the Slate Political Gabfest, a weekly podcast with David Plotz and Emily Bazelon. Dickerson is also the host of Whistlestop, a Slate podcast about presidential history.

Dickerson took over as moderator of Face the Nation on June 7, 2015, where he served until signing off on January 21, 2018. Shortly after this, Dickerson was named the new co-anchor of CBS This Morning, following the firing of Charlie Rose for sexual misconduct.

He is the author of, most recently, The Hardest Job in the World: The American Presidency. Publishers Weekly described it as an “evenhanded and insightful look at the evolution of the American presidency.” He is also the author of Whistlestop: My Favorite Stories from Presidential Campaign History, published by Twelve, an imprint of Hachette Book Group, on August 2, 2016.

In November 2018, John Dickerson contributed a few educational videos to Khan Academy during the 2018 midterm elections.

Dickerson was a contributor for 60 Minutes from 2019 to 2021. Dickerson's investigation in December 2020 titled "Excited Delirium" on the killing of Elijah McClain was nominated for Outstanding Investigative Report in a Newsmagazine at the 42nd News and Documentary Emmy Awards.

On May 10, 2019, CBS News President Susan Zirinsky said that Dickerson would fill in for a week (week of May 13, 2019) on the CBS Evening News after then-anchor Jeff Glor stepped down. Glor was replaced by Norah O'Donnell on July 15, 2019. CBS News would use a rotating series of anchors to staff the broadcast until O'Donnell took over, Zirinsky said. On September 6, 2020, Dickerson substituted for Margaret Brennan on Face the Nation.

On August 1, 2024, CBS named Dickerson and Maurice DuBois as the new anchors of the CBS Evening News, replacing O'Donnell, beginning January 27, 2025. In preparation for the Evening News, Dickerson stepped down from anchoring The Daily Report with John Dickerson on CBS News 24/7 on October 15, 2024, a role he held since 2022. Dickerson was succeeded by Lindsey Reiser.

In July 2025, following the settlement between Paramount Global and Donald Trump for the editing of a 60 Minutes interview, Dickerson ended a broadcast on CBS Evening News Plus saying "[t]he Paramount settlement poses a new obstacle," and asked viewers "[c]an you hold power to account after paying it millions? Can an audience trust you when it thinks you’ve traded away that trust? The audience will decide that."

On October 27, 2025, Dickerson announced that he would depart CBS News in December after 16 years with the network. It was not immediately clear why Dickerson was exiting the network, but The New York Times reported the decision was Dickerson's alone, while speculating with other media outlets it was due to the merger of Skydance Media and Paramount Global and the looming changes following Bari Weiss being installed as editor-in-chief of CBS News. Dickerson and co-anchor DuBois both signed off for the final time from the CBS Evening News on December 18, 2025.

== CIA leak case ==
Dickerson co-wrote a July 17, 2003, Time article, "A War on Wilson?", which attributed the leak of Valerie Plame's CIA identity to senior Bush administration officials. Writing for Slate in February 2006 ("Where's My Subpoena?"), Dickerson speculated about why Patrick Fitzgerald never called him as a grand jury witness for his "bit role" in the drama.

On January 29, 2007, during the trial of Scooter Libby, former White House spokesman Ari Fleischer, testifying under an immunity agreement, named Dickerson as one of two reporters (the other was David Gregory of NBC) to whom he revealed that Wilson's wife worked at the CIA on July 11, 2003, during a Presidential visit to Niger, three days before her name was published by columnist Robert Novak. Another reporter, Tamara Lipper of Newsweek, reportedly walked away before he spoke of Plame. Dickerson has disputed Fleischer's account, claiming that Fleischer urged him to look into who sent Wilson but that he did not mention Plame's name or CIA identity. In a second trial dispatch on the matter, Dickerson revealed a previously undisclosed excerpt from his email that July afternoon which he said corroborated his account: "On background WH officials were dissing Wilson. They suggested he was sent on his mission by a low-level person at the agency." Neither Lipper nor Gregory has commented publicly about what Fleischer told them.

On January 31, 2007, former Time reporter Matthew Cooper testified that Dickerson's Africa sources contributed information to the article "A War on Wilson?" In addition to Ari Fleischer, Dickerson also spoke to White House Communications Director Dan Bartlett while in Africa.

== Style ==
The Washington Post once wrote about his style of asking questions: "The master of the game is John Dickerson of Time magazine, who has knocked Bush off script so many times that his colleagues have coined a term for cleverly worded, seemingly harmless, but incisive questions: 'Dickersonian.'"

Dickerson (during April 13, 2004 press conference): "In the last campaign, you were asked a question about the biggest mistake you'd made in your life, and you used to like to joke that it was trading Sammy Sosa. You've looked back before 9/11 for what mistakes might have been made. After 9/11, what would your biggest mistake be, would you say, and what lessons have you learned from it?"

President Bush: "I wish you would have given me this written question ahead of time, so I could plan for it."

On February 29, 2008, Senator Hillary Clinton released a "red phone" television ad suggesting that her opponent, Senator Barack Obama, was unprepared to be president. On a 2008 conference call with Clinton staff, Dickerson asked, "What foreign policy moment would you point to in Hillary's career where she's been tested by crisis?" The question prompted—according to The Hotline—a "pregnant pause" so long "you could've knit a sweater in the time it took the usually verbose team of Mark Penn, Howard Wolfson and Lee Feinstein, Clinton's national security director, to find a cogent answer."

== See also ==
- New Yorkers in journalism

Media offices
Preceded by Bob Schieffer	Face the Nation Moderator; June 7, 2015 – January 21, 2018	Succeeded by Margaret Brennan
Preceded by Norah O'Donnell	CBS Evening News Weekday Edition Co-anchor; January 27, 2025 – December 18, 2025; Served alongside: Maurice DuBois	Succeeded by Tony Dokoupil
