= John L. Weinberg =

American investment banker

- Born: John Livingston Weinberg; January 25, 1925; Scarsdale, New York, US
- Died: August 7, 2006 (aged 81); Greenwich, Connecticut, US
- Education: Deerfield Academy, Princeton University, Harvard Business School
- Occupation: Investment banker
- Employer: Goldman Sachs
- Spouse: Sue Ann Gotshal (m. 1952)
- Children: 3
- Parent: Sidney J. Weinberg

John Livingston Weinberg (January 25, 1925 – August 7, 2006) was an American banker and businessperson, running Goldman Sachs from 1976 to 1990.

== Early life ==
Weinberg was the son of Sidney Weinberg, a banker at Goldman Sachs, and was born and grew up in the Westchester County suburb of Scarsdale. He was educated at Deerfield Academy. He graduated with an A.B. in economics from Princeton University in 1948 after completing a senior thesis titled "Status and Functions of Corporate Directors." (In 2026, the thesis was published in the book Boardroom Legacy, edited by Lawrence Cunningham.) Weinberg then attended Harvard Business School. He had served as a lieutenant in the U.S. Marines in World War II and was recalled for the Korean War.

== Career ==
He joined Goldman Sachs in 1950 and rose to become a senior investment banker and chairman of the management committee, running the firm from 1976 to 1990. At Goldman, he resisted taking the firm public, and during his tenure, Goldman refused to work on hostile takeovers.

He was a director of the Seagram drinks group, newspaper publisher Knight-Ridder, and the chemical firm Du Pont. He was a trustee of Princeton University and New York-Presbyterian Hospital. He endowed the Weinberg Center for Corporate Governance at the University of Delaware.

== Family and death ==
John L. Weinberg died at the age of 81 due to complications from a fall. He and his wife Sue Ann Gotshal, daughter of Sylvan Gotshal (1897–1968), lived in Greenwich, Connecticut. They had two children, and five grandchildren. Their son, John S. Weinberg, joined Goldman Sachs in 1983, became a partner in 1992, and was vice chairman from 2006 to 2015. He joined Evercore in 2016 as chairman and became CEO in 2020.

Business positions
Preceded by John C. Whitehead	Chairman and CEO, Goldman Sachs; 1976–1990	Succeeded by Robert Rubin
